= University City, Philadelphia =

University City
- Neighborhood of Philadelphia
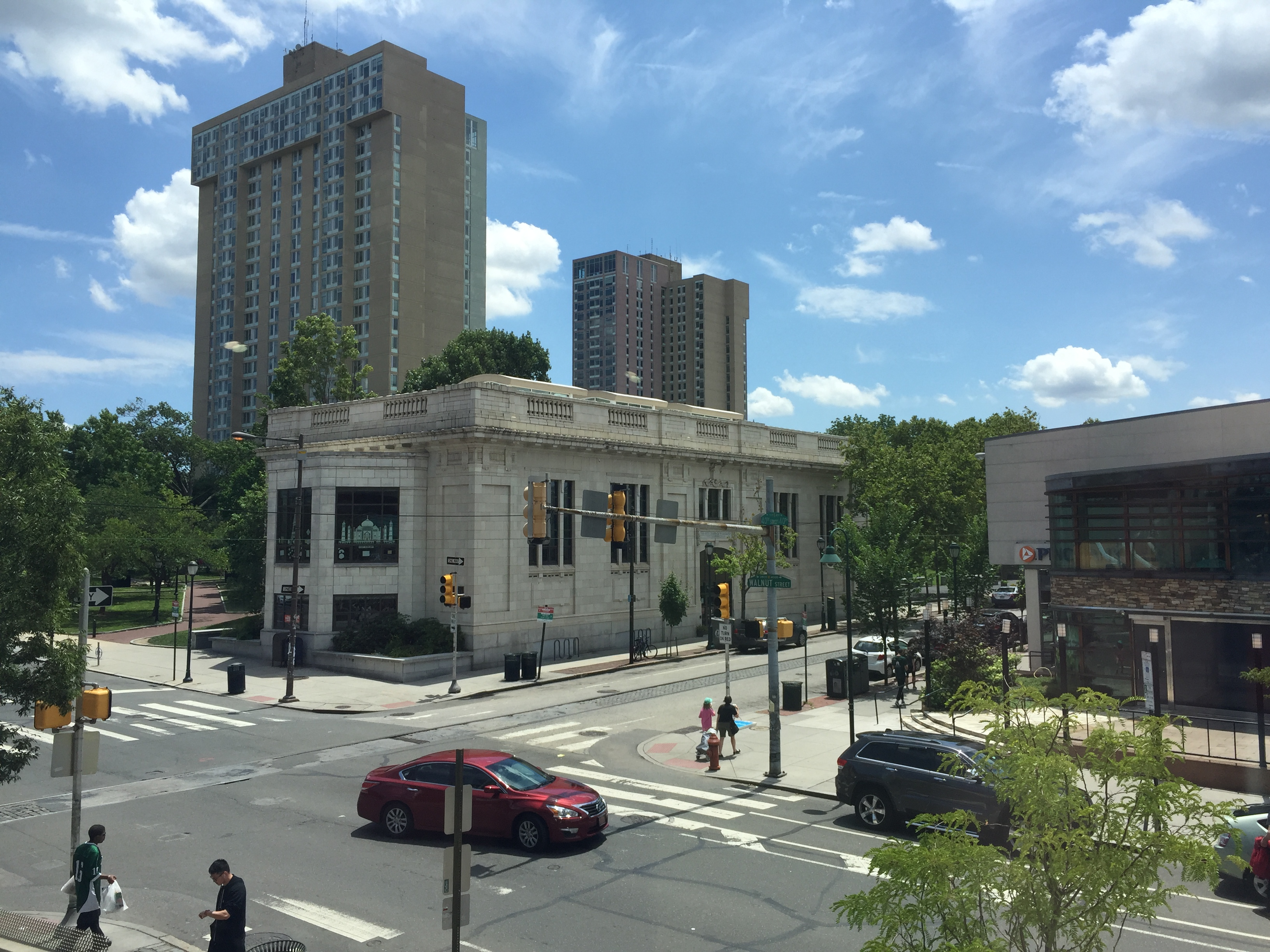
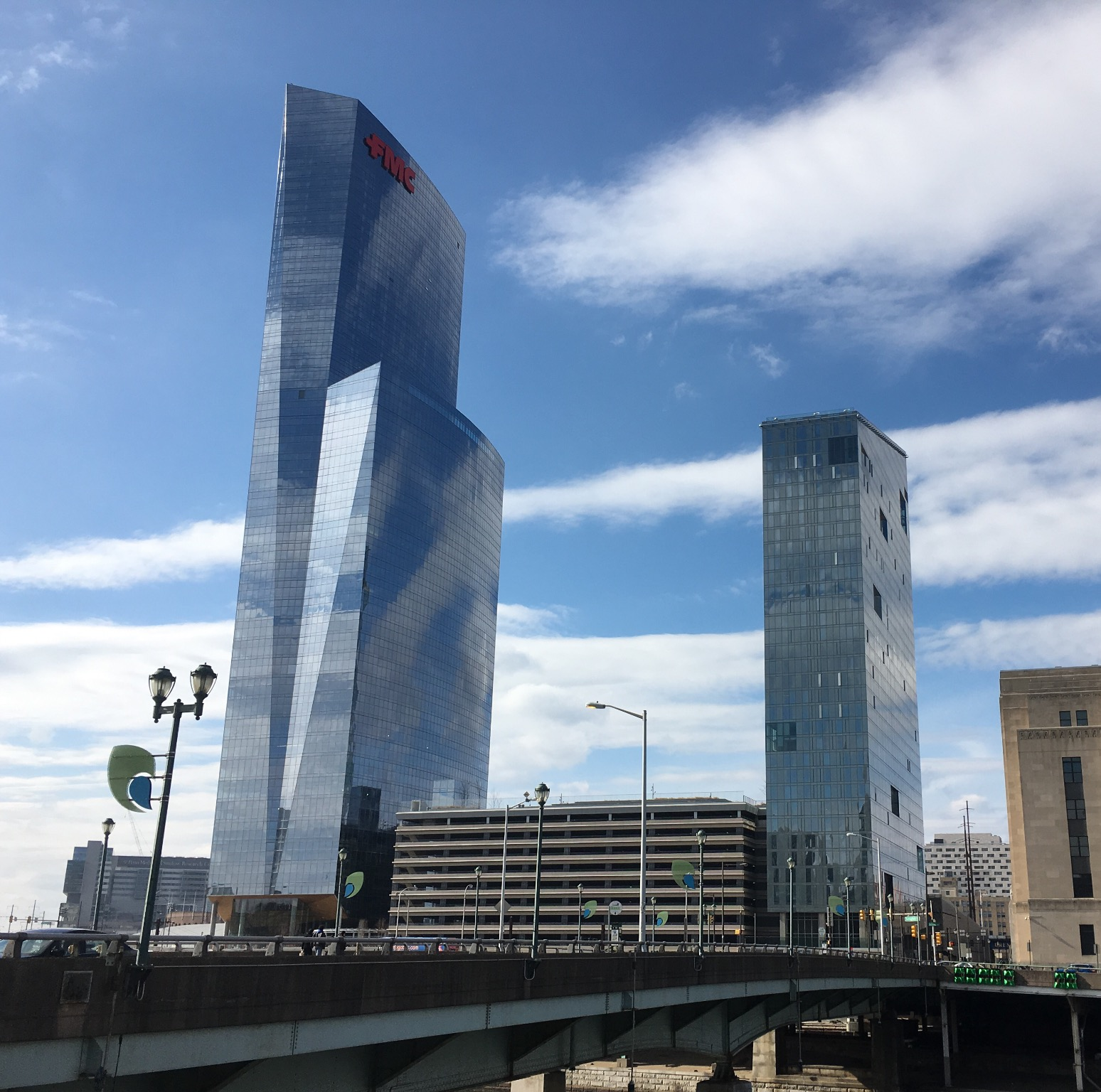
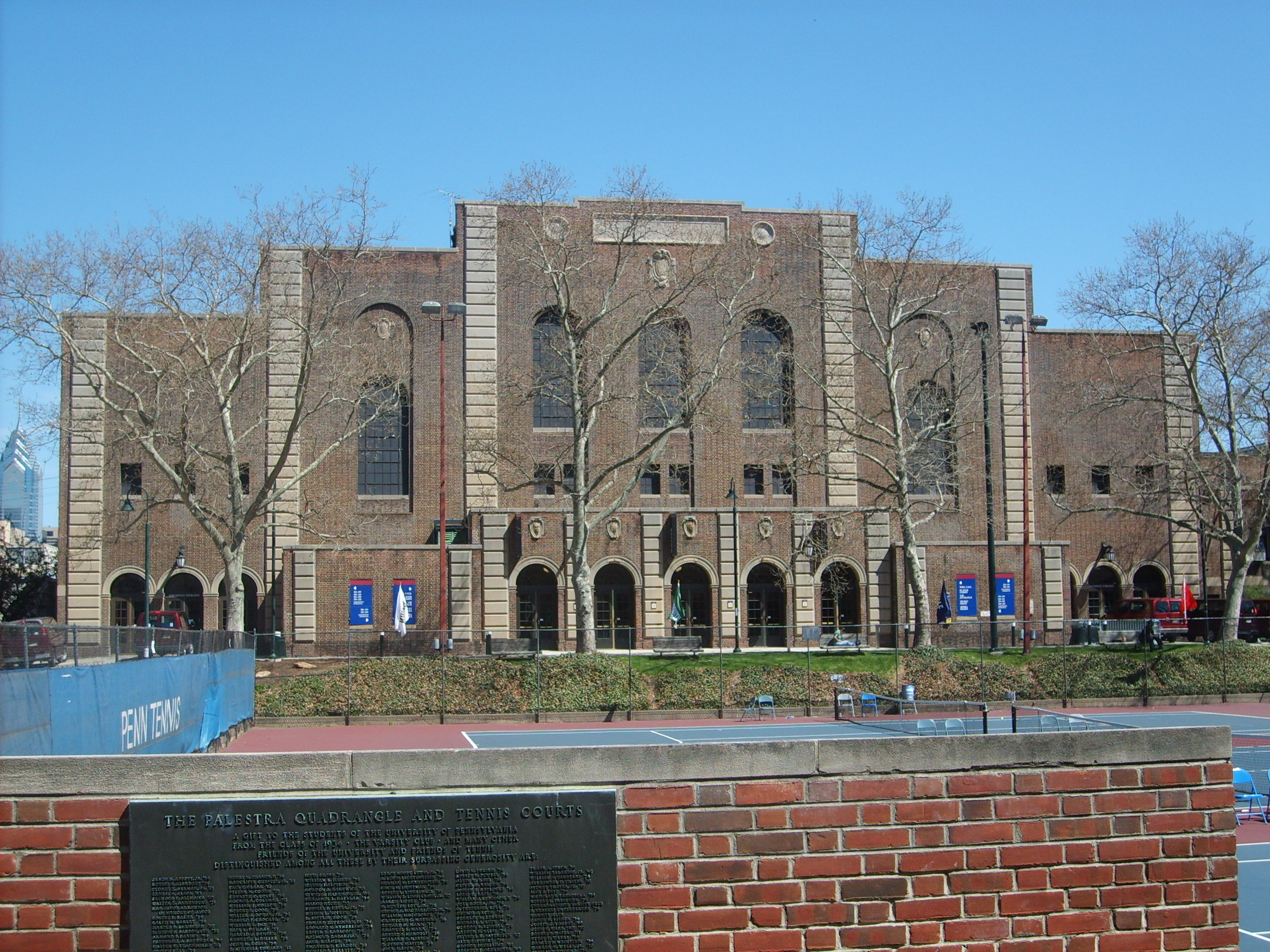
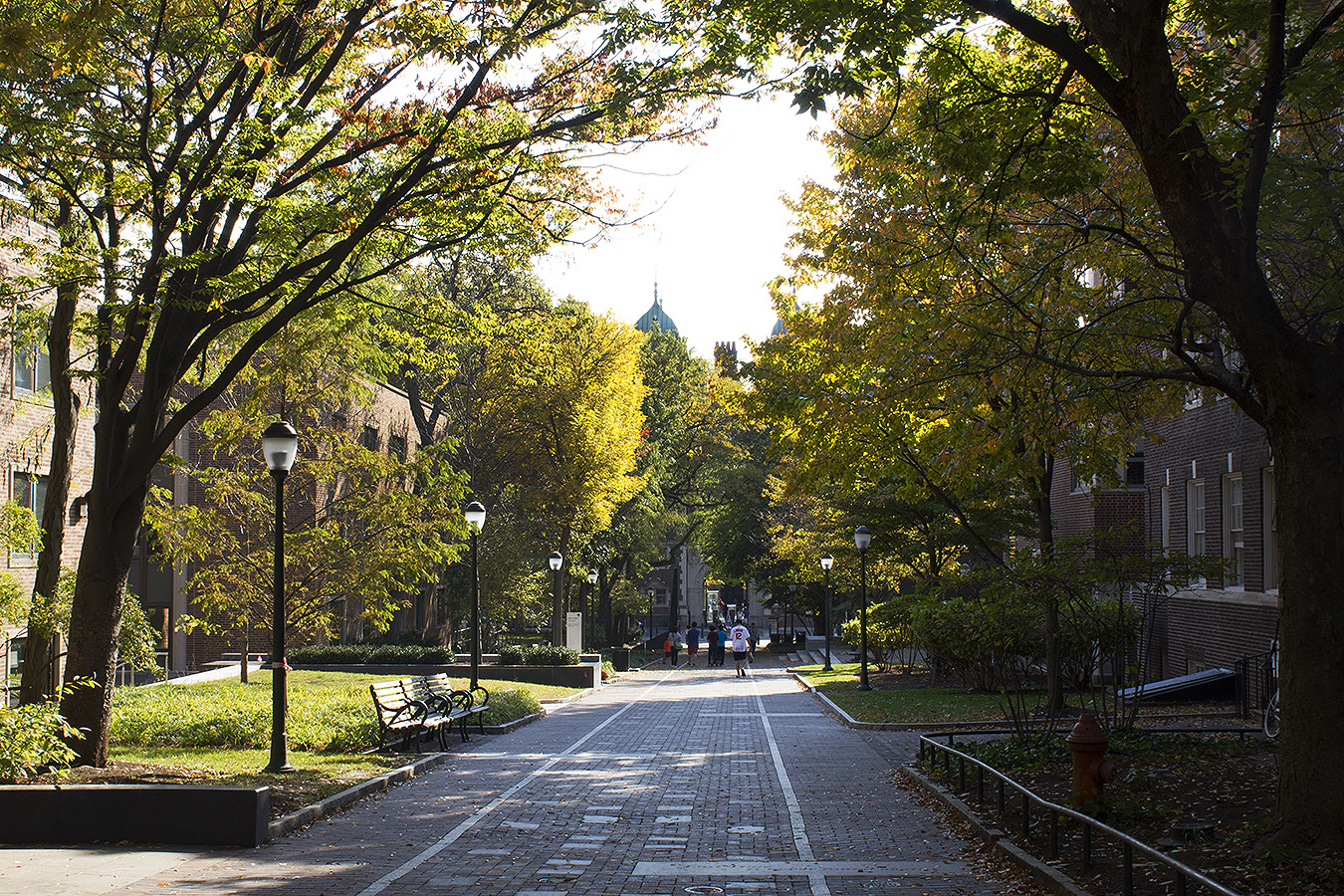
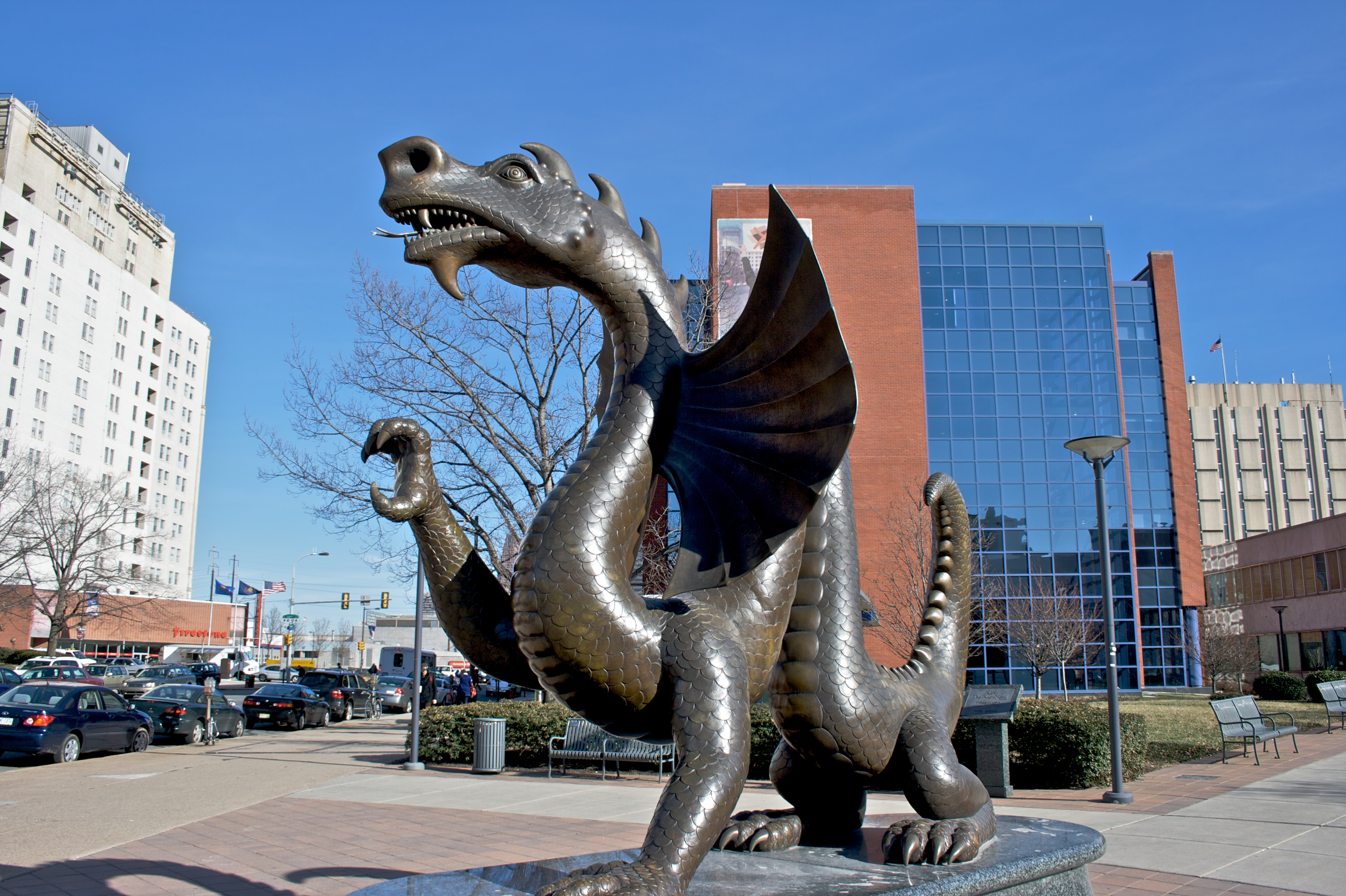
- University City at 40th and Walnut with the Free Library of Philadelphia branch in front Cira Centre South The Palestra University of Pennsylvania Drexel University

- Location within Philadelphia
- Coordinates: 39°57′13″N 75°11′55″W
- Country: United States
- State: Pennsylvania
- County: Philadelphia County
- City: Philadelphia

Population (2014)
  - Total: 50,967
- ZIP Code: 19104, 19139, and 19143
- Area codes: 215, 267, and 445

University City is the easternmost portion of West Philadelphia, encompassing several Philadelphia universities. It is situated directly across the Schuylkill River from Center City.

The University of Pennsylvania was instrumental in coining the name University City as part of a 1950s urban renewal and gentrification effort. University City is also home to Drexel University and the University City campus of Saint Joseph's University.

The eastern side of University City contains the Penn and Drexel campuses, several medical institutions, independent centers of scientific research, 30th Street Station, one of the nation's busiest passenger train stations, Cira Centre, and Cira Centre South. The western side contains Victorian and early 20th-century housing stock and is primarily residential.

== Demographics ==
The University City neighborhood consists of 25,183 males and 25,783 females. The area population has grown 2.6% from 2000 to 2014 and 0.7% from 2010 to 2014. There are 32,935 white collar workers and 11,555 blue collar workers.

The area is ethnically and economically diverse, although the compositions of its 12 census tracts vary widely; for example, the population in the mid-2000s of the easternmost tract was about half white and one-third Asian, while that of the northwesternmost tract was almost entirely black.

== History ==
Before the European colonization of the Americas, Philadelphia was home to the Lenape people, whose land, known as Lenapehoking, covered much of the Atlantic coast from western Connecticut to Delaware.

In 1677, William Warner purchased 1,500 acres (6.1 km^{2}) from the local Indian tribe and named it Blockley after his native parish in England. Blockley Township had a poor reputation in the 19th century. "It was an ideal hideout for shadowy characters and evil-doers who crossed the river in skiffs after a thieving or smuggling job south of the city. As late as 1850 it was considered hazardous to be abroad alone in this area." The Blockley Almshouse, later known as Philadelphia General Hospital, was there. Though Blockley was founded five years before Philadelphia, people soon referred to it as "West Philadelphia". Later, parts of Blockley were carved out to form the District of West Philadelphia.

In 1735, Andrew Hamilton, a "Philadelphia Lawyer", purchased 300 acres (1.2 km^{2}) in Blockley Township. The area came to be known as Hamilton Village and The Woodlands, a sprawling botanical garden and mansion, was built there. The gardens is now the Woodlands Cemetery, while much of the rest of Hamilton Village is covered by the 40th Street retail corridor.

A small section on the northern side of this area was once known as Greenville. Situated near Lancaster Ave., Powelton Ave., and Market St., Greenville served as a waypoint for travelers and cattle drivers, and many taverns and inns were established. Later, the area expanded in all directions with many German immigrants and offered much more than simple taverns. By the mid-20th century, the Greenville area had changed again, to a neighborhood that was colloquially referred to as the Black Bottom, signifying the neighborhood's racial and economic status. Much of this neighborhood was destroyed as part of a gentrification plan in the 1960s.

The arrival of electrified streetcars in the 1890s kick-started development to the west of 43rd Street, and bridges and a tunnel in the first decade of the 20th century allowed people to easily commute into Center City. This led to rapid development within the borders of University City and far beyond. It was around this time that the "local" neighborhood names like Spruce Hill and Cedar Park were established.

In the mid-1950s, two realtors and Penn graduates coined the name "University City" in an attempt to attract Penn faculty back to the neighborhoods near Penn. The boundaries were defined as extending from the "Schuylkill River to 52nd Street, and from Haverford Avenue to the Media-line railroad tracks south of Kingsessing Avenue — though over the years many have viewed it as a smaller domain". This has led to some community tension; some saw it as an attempt to secede from West Philadelphia.

== Boundaries ==
University City's boundaries, as defined by the non-profit University City District organization and the City of Philadelphia, are the Schuylkill River to the east; Spring Garden Street, Powelton Avenue, and Market Street to the north; 52nd Street to the west; and Woodland Avenue, University Avenue, and Civic Center Boulevard to the south. Within these boundaries are the local neighborhoods of Cedar Park, Garden Court, Spruce Hill, Squirrel Hill, Powelton Village, Walnut Hill, and Woodland Terrace. The boundaries also encompass several historic districts, including the West Philadelphia Streetcar Suburb Historic District, and the ZIP codes 19104, 19139, and 19143.

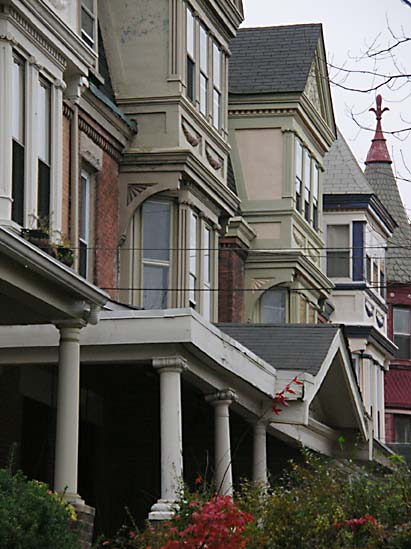
Homes in Cedar Park

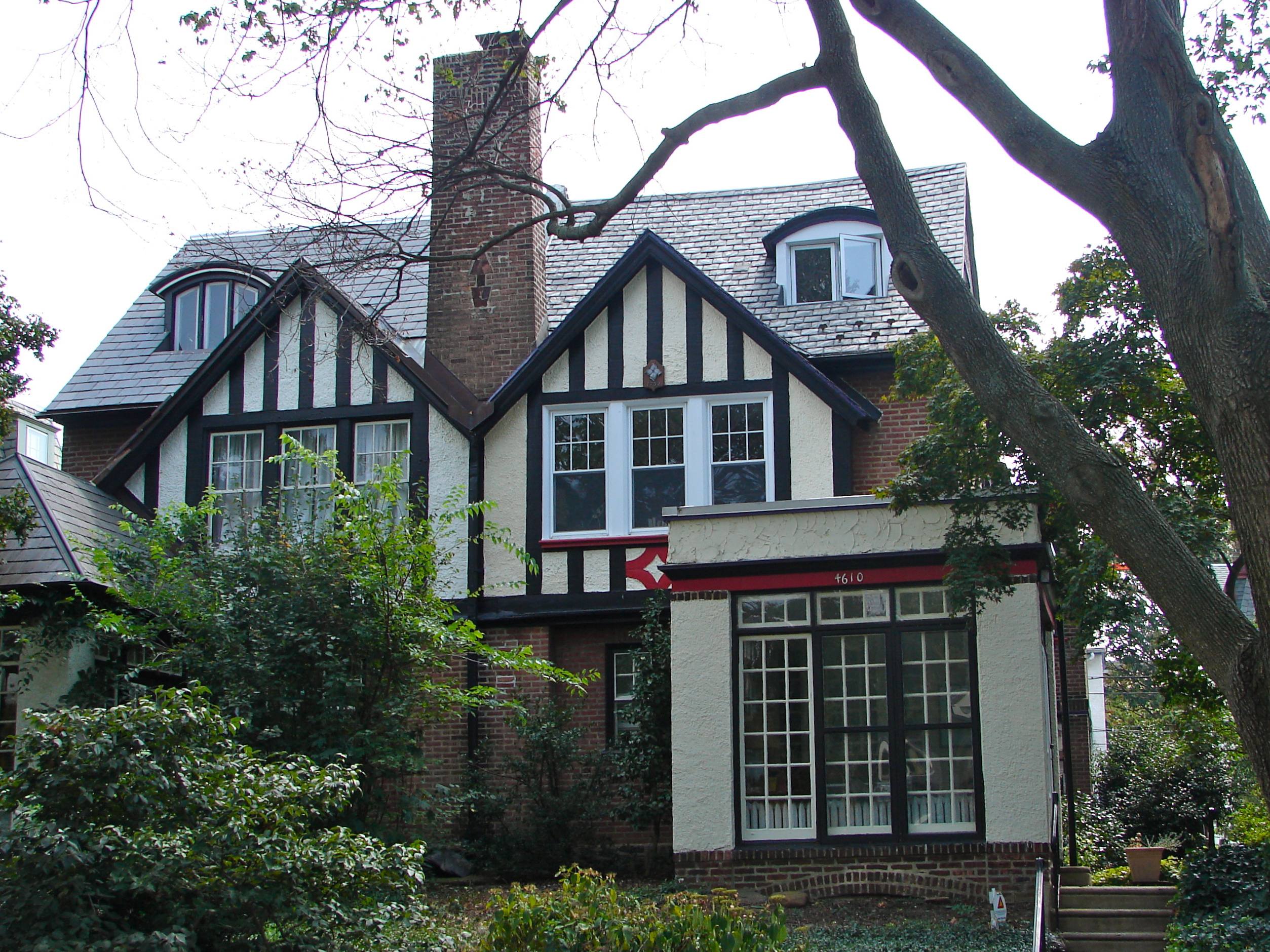
Homes in Garden Court

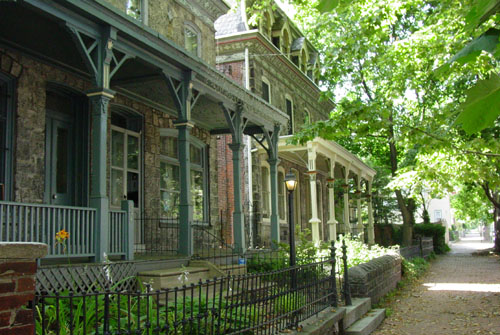
Homes in Powelton Village

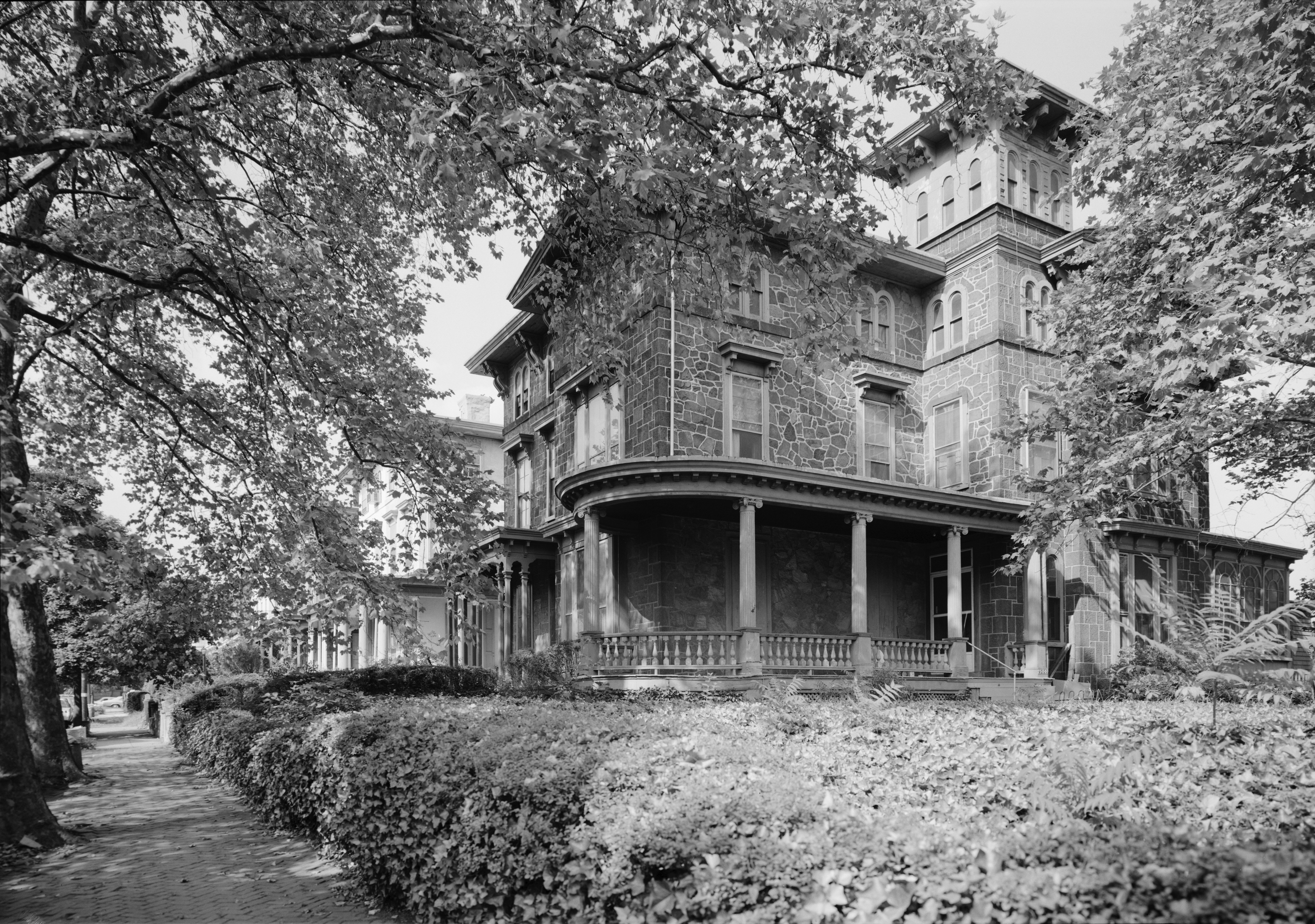
Homes in Woodland Terrace

== Town–university relations ==
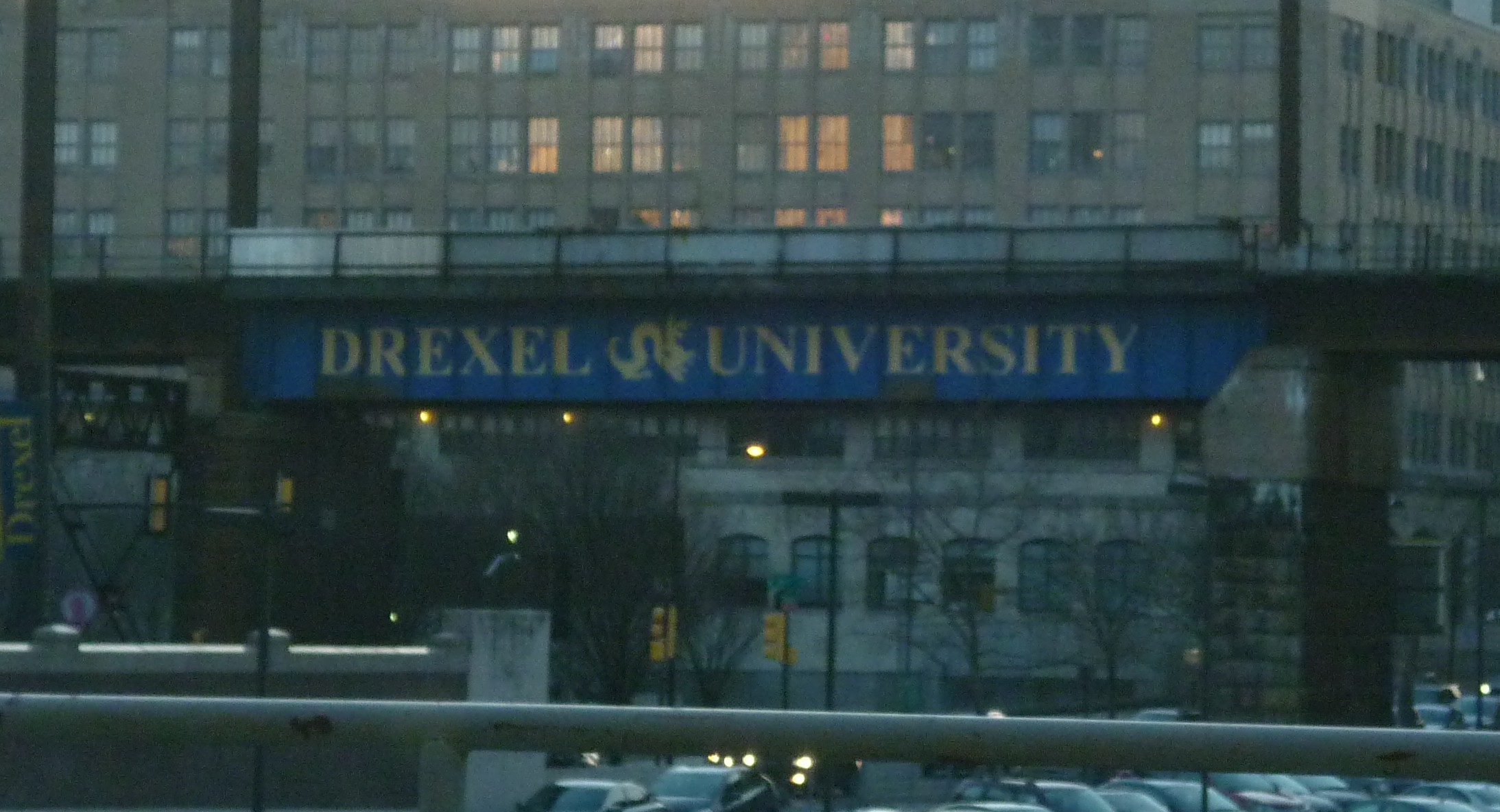
Rail bridge over Chestnut St., painted with Drexel's logo

University City has a history of strained town and gown relations, particularly with the University of Pennsylvania ("Penn" for short), the city's largest private employer and the second-largest private employer in Pennsylvania. During the 1960s, Penn led a series of gentrification and redevelopment programs that have changed the character of the area.

Opened in 2001, Penn Alexander is a neighborhood public elementary school which Penn helped to build and subsidizes. It is open to students inside a "catchment" defined by the School District of Philadelphia and Philadelphia City Council. The Penn Mortgage program is a grant made by Penn to any of its staff towards the purchase of a home in West Philadelphia or to be used for the improvement of any staff that currently owns a home in West Philadelphia. The university is also an active participant in branding the area as "University City", with its logo showing up next to the name on signs and bridges (not including street signs directing to University City, which are erected by the city, state, and federal governments).

For decades, 40th Street was generally considered the "invisible campus boundary" between the residential neighborhoods to the west and the Penn campus to the east. In recent years, the "Penn bubble" is said to have expanded further west.

== Major redevelopment projects ==
=== West Philadelphia Corporation ===
As part of the Housing Act of 1949, Congress established the "Slum Clearance and Community Development and Redevelopment" program, commissioning federal funds to "assist local communities in eliminating their slums and blighted areas and in providing the maximum opportunity for the redevelopment of project areas by private enterprise." A few years prior, in 1945, the Redevelopment Authority of the City of Philadelphia (RDA) was formed with the power to acquire and redevelop land through condemnation proceedings. This power to take land reached University City when The West Philadelphia Corporation (WPC) was formed in 1959 by a group of local institutions including Penn. A 1965 map shows the "units" identified for redevelopment.

==== Unit 3 ====
Unit 3, the largest of the identified areas, spanned roughly from 34th to 40th streets and North of Chestnut to Lancaster and Powelton streets, covering most of the Black Bottom neighborhood. By 1965, the WPC had developed a plan to demolish homes in Unit 3 and redevelop the land into a center of private scientific research, an expanded hospital, and a large new high school. This particular development was covered in Penn's student newspaper by a five-part series called "The Quiet War" that ran from January 23 to January 27, 1967.

Within four years, the University City Science Center had been established and most of the buildings on Market St. between 34th St. and 40th St. had been demolished.

University City High School was opened in 1972, after years of planning by the WPC and the School District of Philadelphia and conflict with the displaced community.

==== Unit 4 ====
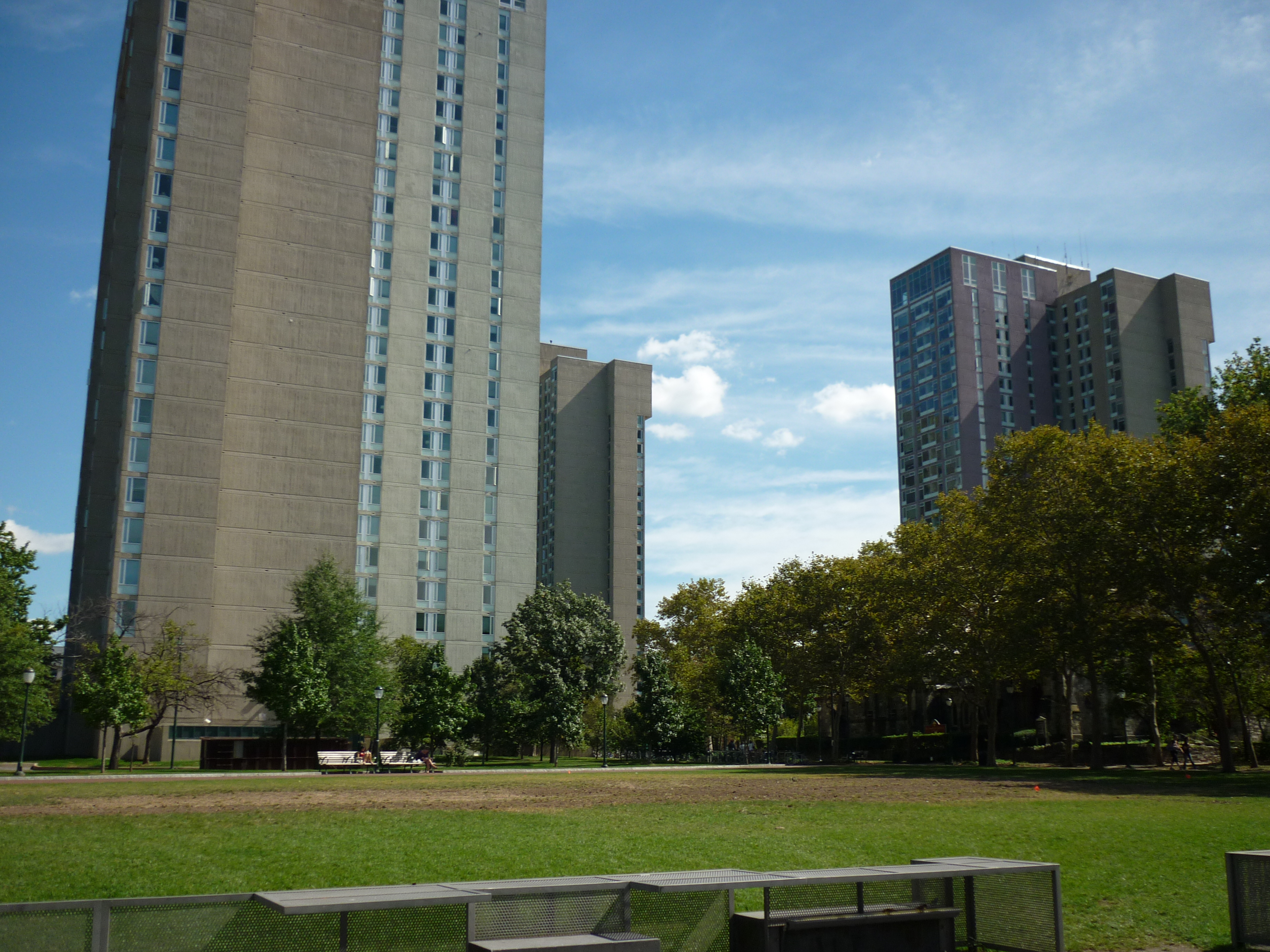
View of superblock from 40th St.

Much of what is now the center of Penn's campus, including Locust Walk and Superblock, was part of the redevelopment of Unit 4.

Over the course of 1968 to 1970 and with the assistance of the local redevelopment authorities, Penn acquired, cleared and redeveloped the four-block area between 38th, 40th, Spruce, and Walnut streets. The primary features of this area, which became known as "Superblock", are three high-rise apartment-style dormitories. The key purpose of creating these high-rises was to accommodate 3,500 more students at the university. The whole superblock project and especially the high-rise design were widely criticized, but this view is not held by everyone.

==== Other activity ====
WPC also guided several other redevelopments that directly benefited Penn and Drexel. Project "A" was the plan to redevelop Units 1a, 1b and 2, the land between 32nd, 34th, Walnut and Chestnut. This resulted in Penn's Women's Dorm (now Hill House) and several Drexel buildings along Chestnut. Additional areas were carved out for Penn's Wharton and Annenberg schools and Physics department. Unit 5 was reserved for Drexel.

=== Schuylkill riverfront ===
Along the west bank of the Schuylkill River lie several large parcels of land that have historically seen large-scale non-residential use. As of the 1960s, the most prominent uses of this area were for Philadelphia's main train station, post office, and civic center. Since then, these and other nearby parcels have seen significant redevelopment.

==== Rail yards ====
Of particular interest for redevelopment have been the large rail yards near 30th St. Station, now owned by Amtrak. Several plans were made to cover and build over this area. As of 2015, most of these plans, including a baseball stadium and grounds for a World's fair have been scrapped, but a new plan called "30th Street Station District" is in the works. The Schuylkill Yards project is also in this area.

A small part of this area was used to build the Cira Centre, a 29-story, crystal-shaped office tower with distinctive LED lighting visible at night.

==== Civic Center complex ====
Beginning in 1991, Penn publicly expressed official interest in acquiring the 19.2 acres (78,000 m^{2}) to the southeast of its campus occupied by the Philadelphia Civic Center complex. After the opening of the Pennsylvania Convention Center in 1992, the Civic Center was mostly unused. In 1998, a City Council resolution was put forth to turn over much of this property to Penn and CHOP. The initial plans were not fully developed, but did not call for the demolition of Convention Hall, the location of several historic events. By 2005, plans had been expanded and the whole site, including Convention Hall, was slated for demolition to make way for a new clinical care facility attached to the hospital. Many local preservationists were opposed to this. Some were mollified by an exhaustive study commissioned by Penn to find alternate uses for the buildings and demolition continued. The last remaining building in the complex, Pennsylvania Hall, was demolished on March 3, 2007. Penn's Perelman Center for Advanced Medicine was officially opened on October 2, 2008.

==== Postal lands ====
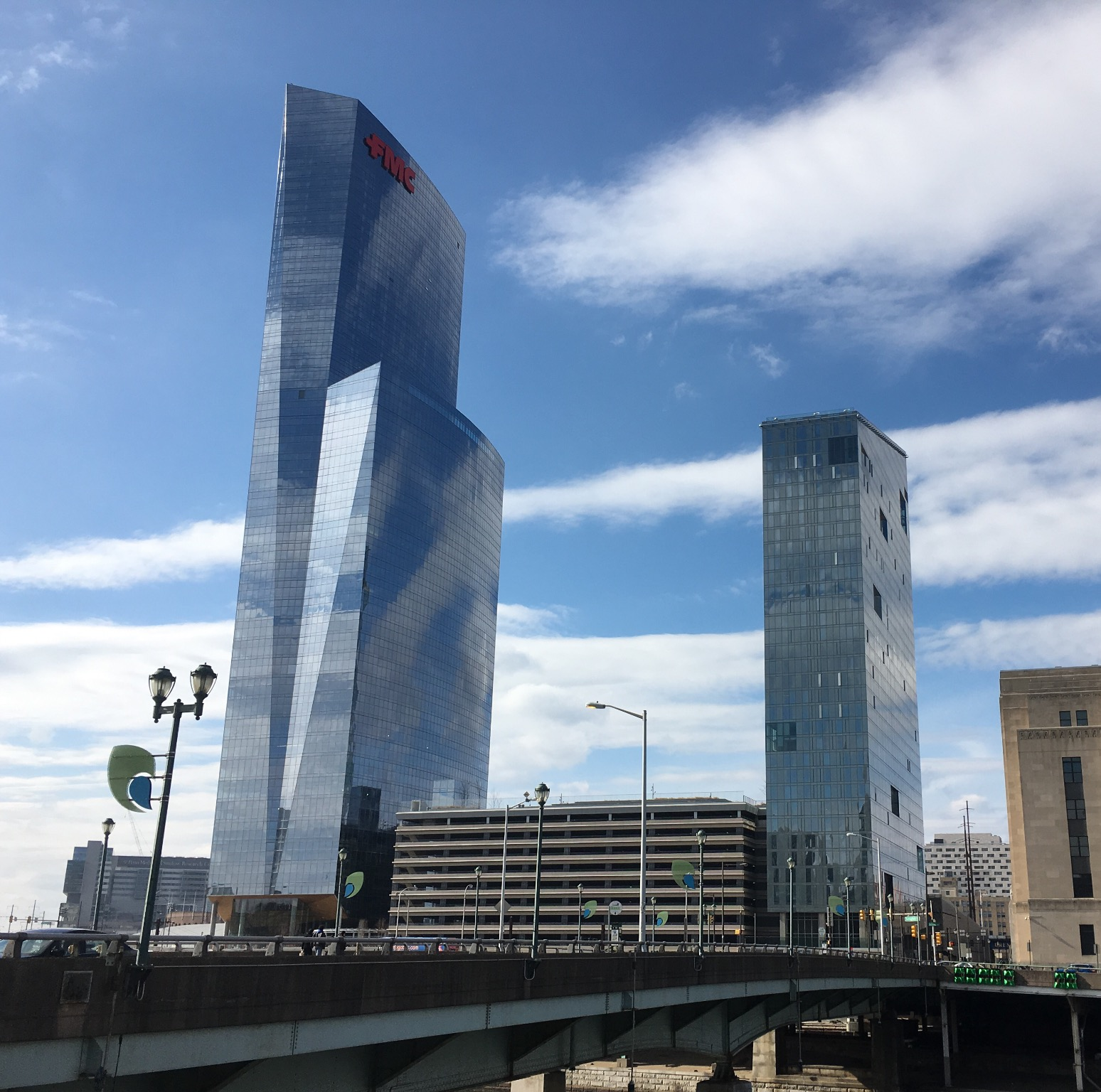
Cira Center South

In 2007, Penn bought 24 acres (97,000 m^{2}) between its campus and the Schuylkill river, an area formerly occupied by the United States Postal Service known as the Postal Lands. (A 1994 map shows the area before the GE building was refurbished into the Left Bank and the Cira Centre was built.) Penn repurposed the Postal Lands into a new high-rise office and residential complex, Cira Centre South, and a public park with University athletic facilities, Penn Park. In addition, the former post office building has been turned into office space for the IRS.

Penn Park opened in September 2011 as a new urban park that stretches from Walnut Street to South Street featuring a fabric of tightly interwoven recreational and athletic components. The project also includes underground cisterns that collect and repurpose rainwater.

Cira Centre South was developed by Brandywine Realty Trust and completed in 2016. Two new towers replaced a one-time truck annex for the Post Office and now include the headquarters for the FMC Corp., a parking garage with a green roof open to the public, an apartment building, and street-level retail. The 49-story FMC Tower in this complex is the tallest building in University City.

== University City District ==
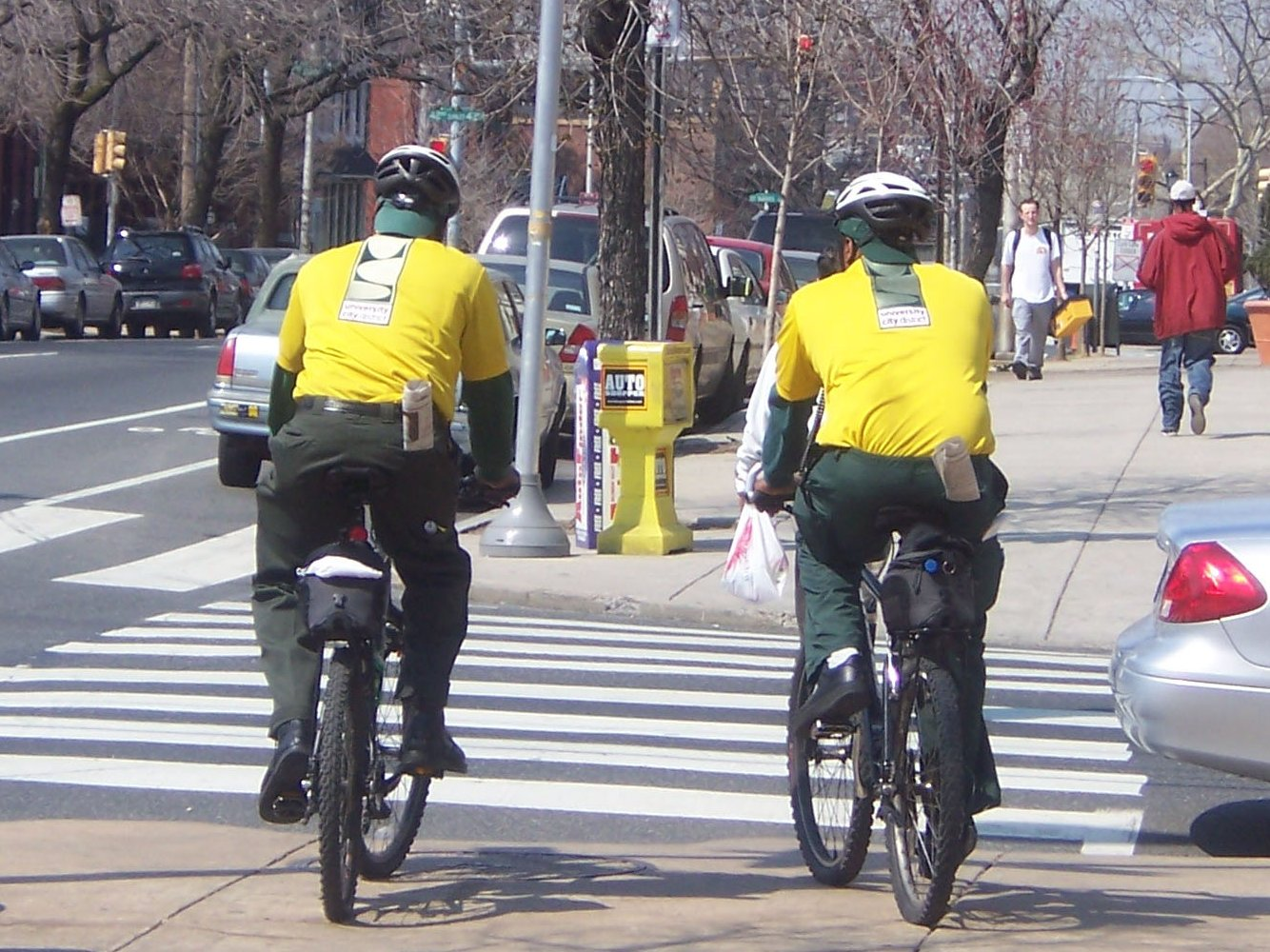
UCD bike patrol

University City District (UCD) is the name of a private, non-profit organization created by the University of Pennsylvania and other local institutions in 1997 in an effort to provide University City with additional safety, cleanup, and marketing services as well as help in coordinating district initiatives.

=== UCD demographics report ===
In 2007, the University City District released a new edition of its University City Report Card, based on 2006 demographic statistics.

The report said the area had 45,787 people living in 16,625 households, 29% of which are classified as "family" households and the rest as "non-family". The average household size was two people, whose median age was 23.8 years. Median household income was $23,749; median "family" household income was $40,042. 8.1% of households had incomes of $100,000 or more and 35.2% had incomes of less than $15,000. The racial makeup of University City was about 42% Black, 35% White, 18% Asian/Pacific Islander, 4% Hispanic, with the remainder not classified.

The report said local businesses employed 63,878, with educational services employing 53.1% of them and health care services 21%. The largest employers were Penn, with 13,239 employees; Penn Health, 11,136; CHOP, 6,855; Drexel-Main, 2,706; AMTRAK, 2,551; and the VA, 2,100.

The median price of homes purchased in 2006 was $312,000, up 22% from 2005. The average monthly rent for a studio apartment was $667; a one-bedroom apartment, $823; and a two-bedroom apartment, $1,174.

== Local institutions ==
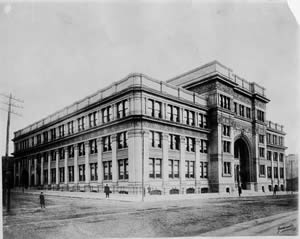
Main Building, Drexel, c. 1892

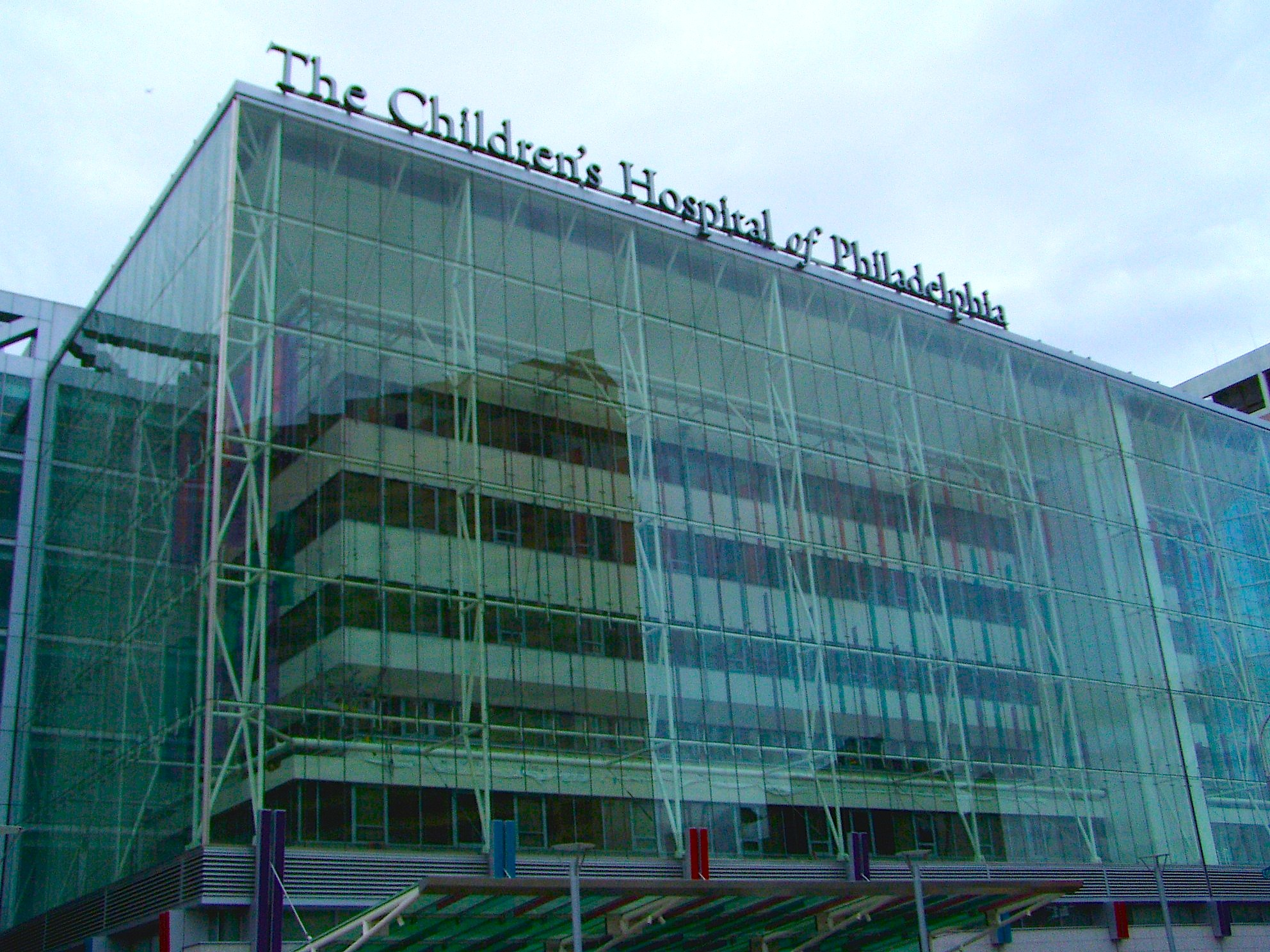
CHOP, 2006

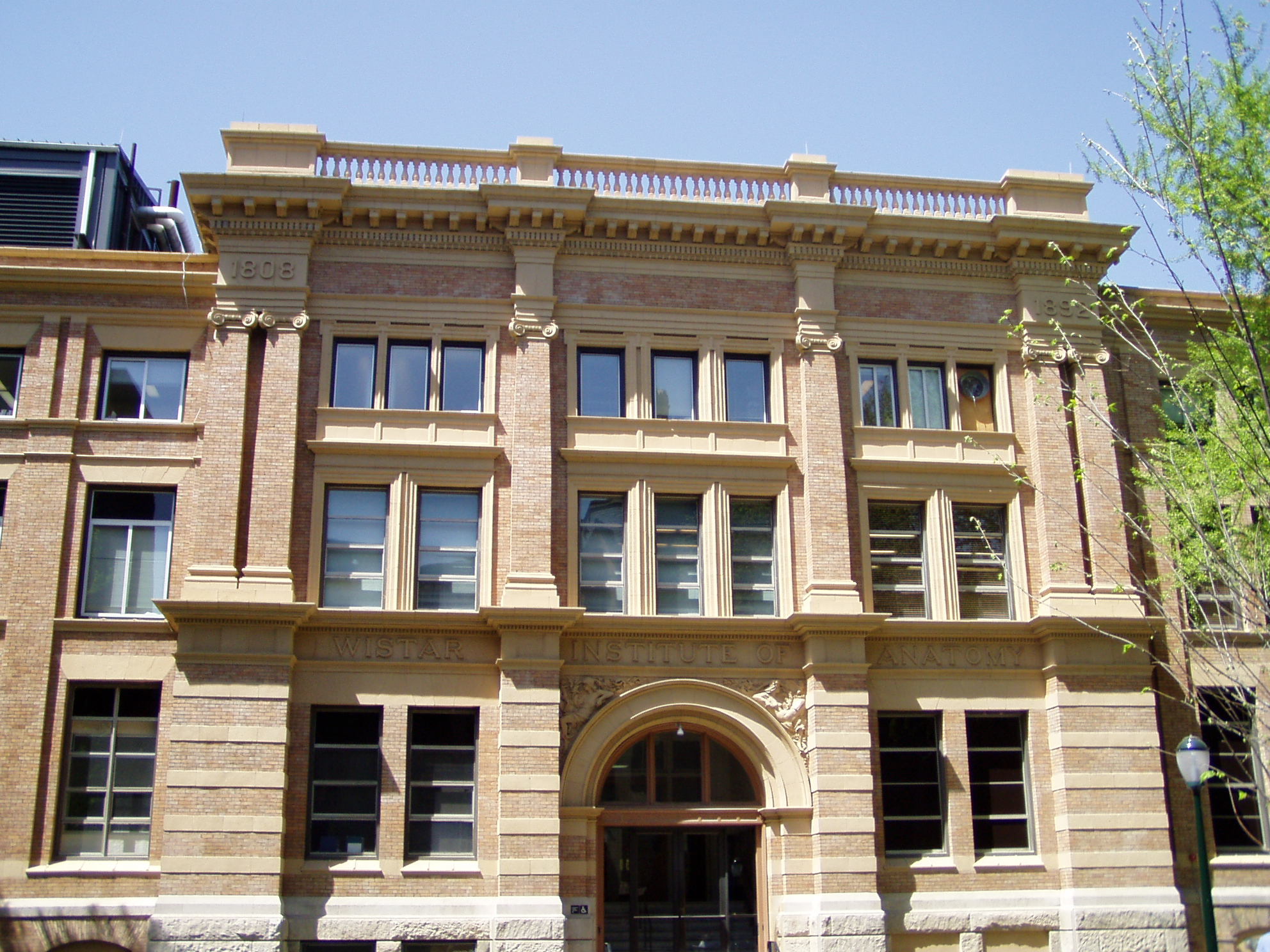
Wistar Institute, 2006

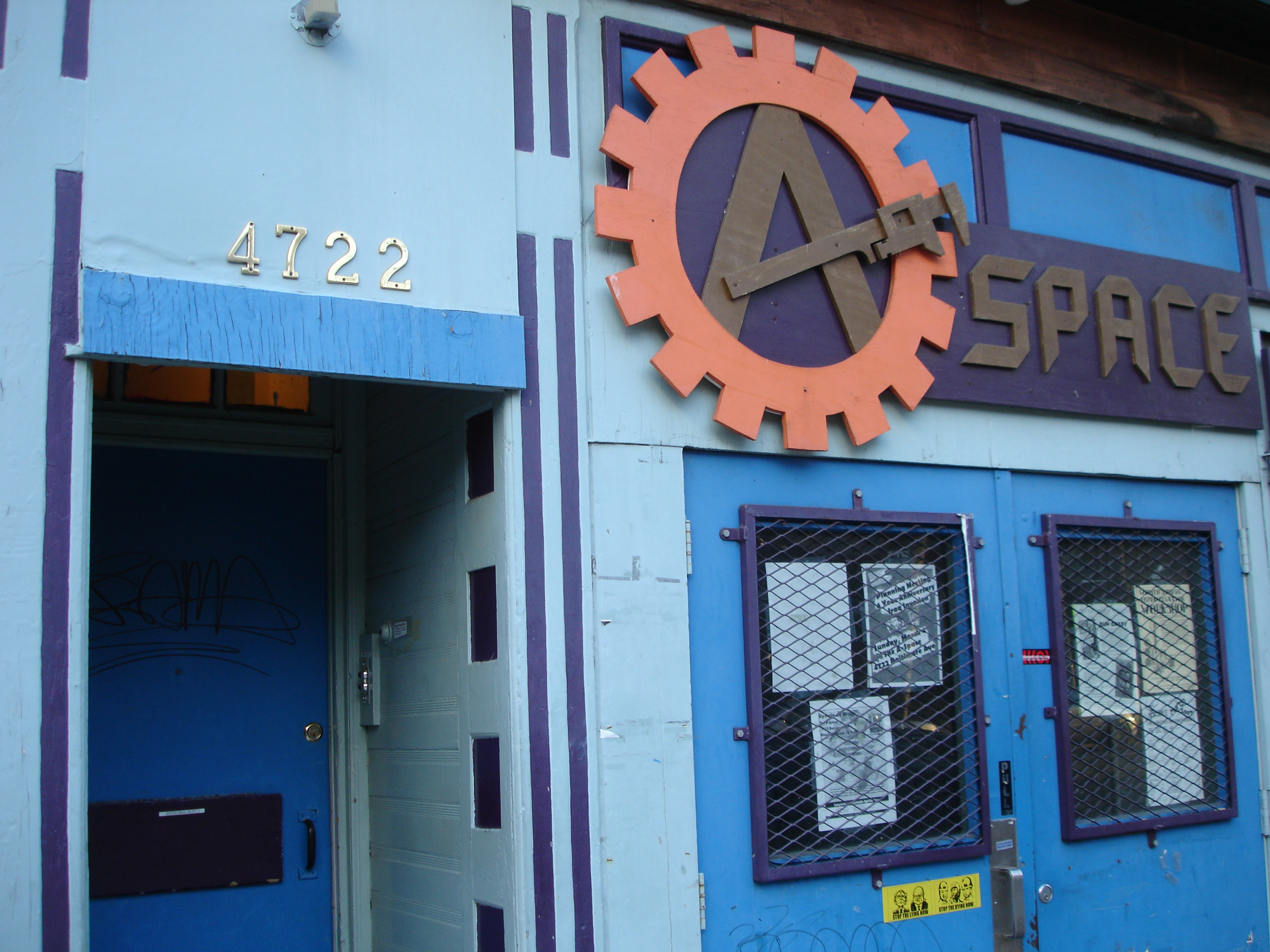
A-Space, 2007

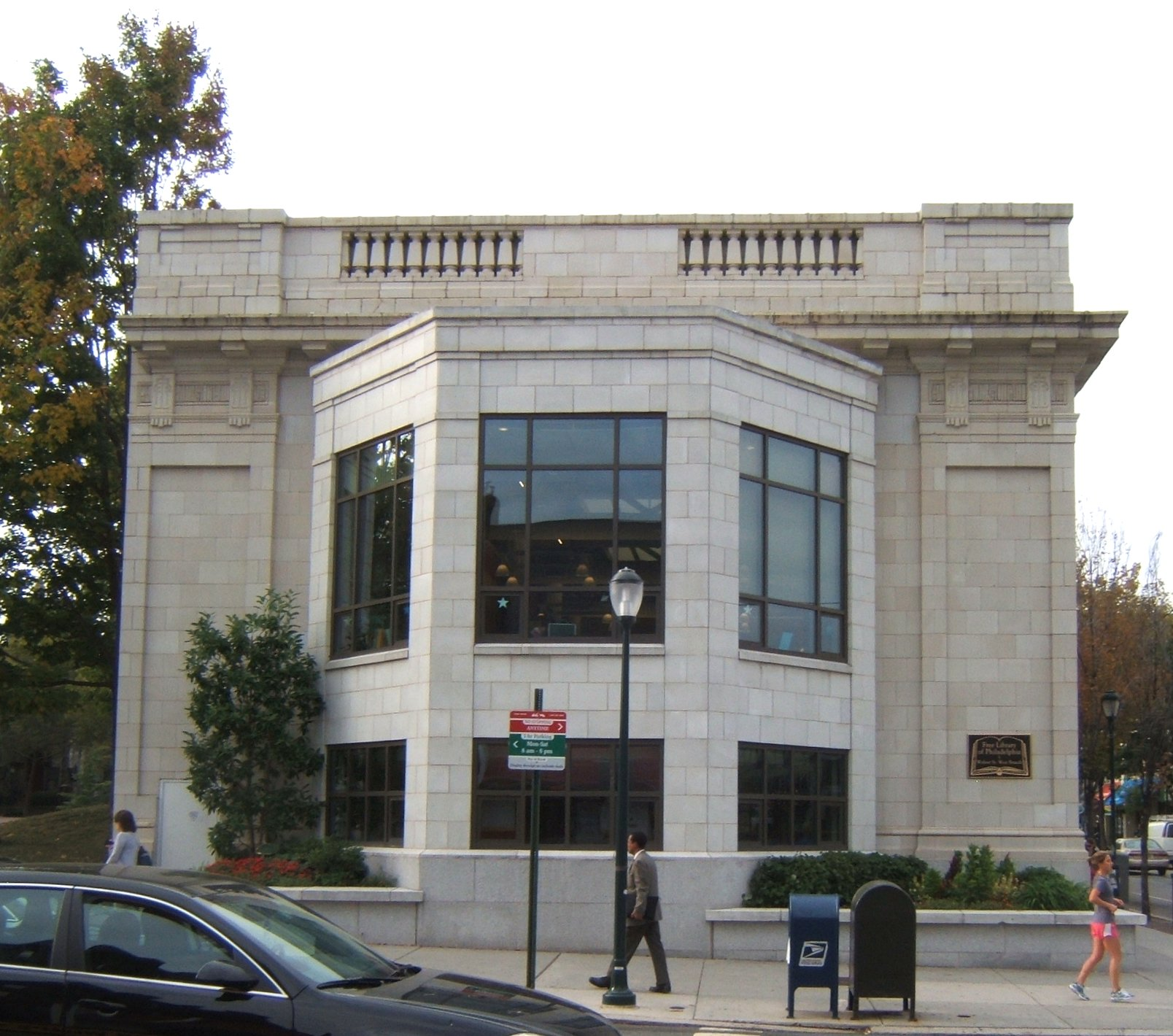
Free Library of Philadelphia, Walnut Street West Branch, 2010

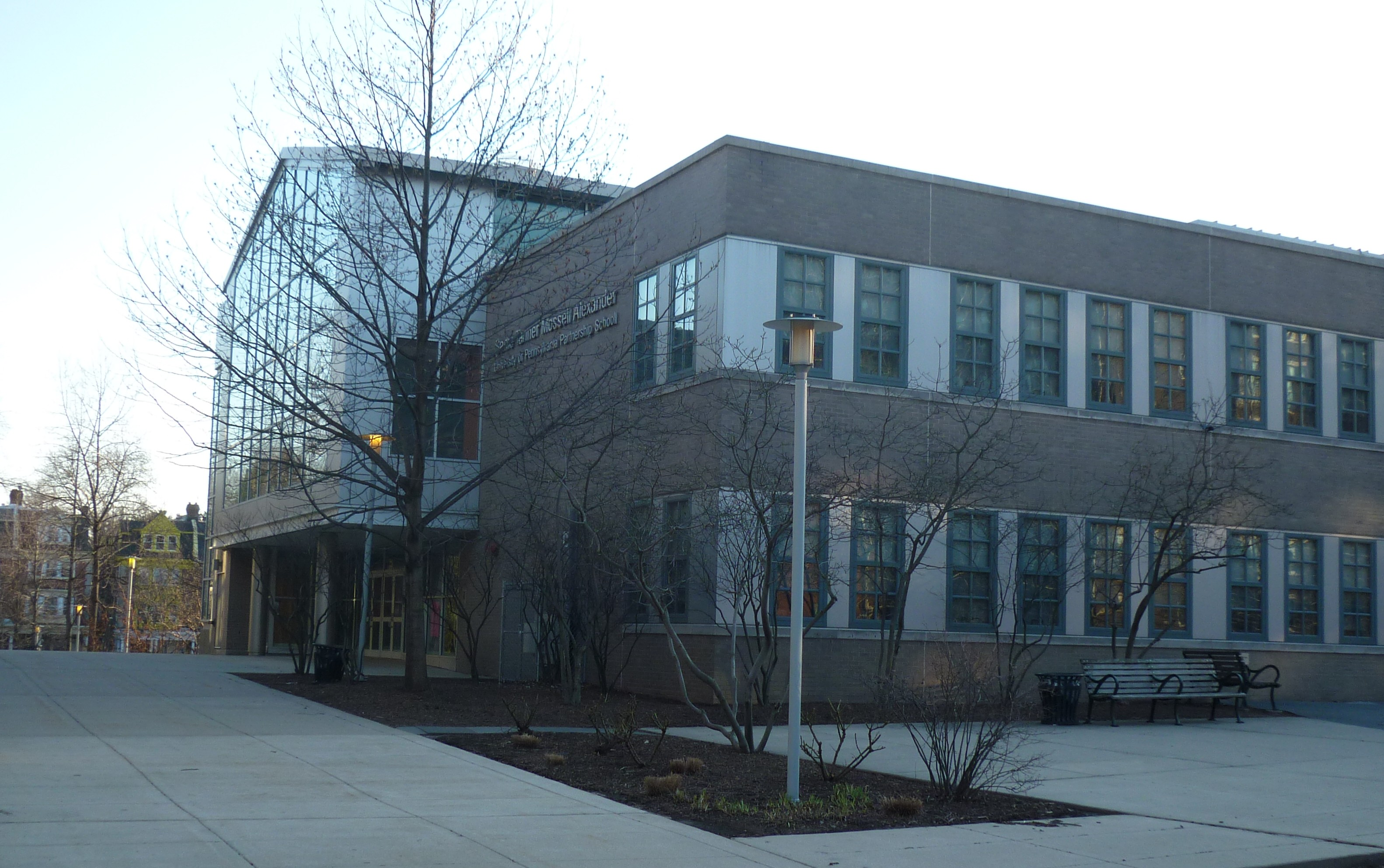
Penn Alexander public elementary school, 2016

=== Higher education ===
Sorted by number of students in 2006:

- University of Pennsylvania (23,704): Founded in 1740, moved to current location in 1872.
- Drexel University (Main Campus: 18,466): Founded in 1891 at current location.
- University City campus of Saint Joseph's University (formerly the University of the Sciences in Philadelphia (3,008): Founded in 1821, moved to current location in 1928.)
- Community College of Philadelphia, West Regional Center (748): Founded in 1965, West campus established in 1985.
- Lincoln University (School of Adult & Continuing Education: 596): Main campus in Chester County founded in 1854, University City location opened in 1976.
- The Restaurant School at Walnut Hill College (535): Founded in 1974, moved to current location in 1992.
- Philadelphia Divinity School (0): Founded in 1858, built campus at 42nd and Spruce in 1921, left neighborhood in 1974.
- Philadelphia College of Osteopathic Medicine (0): Founded in 1899, built campus at 48th and Spruce in 1929, left neighborhood in 1977.
- Middle States Commission on Higher Education (0): Accreditation authority, not a school. Left neighborhood in 2022.

=== Medical ===
- Children's Hospital of Philadelphia ("CHOP"): Children's hospital
- Hospital of the University of Pennsylvania ("HUP"): General hospital
- Penn Presbyterian Medical Center ("Presby"): General hospital
- VA Medical Center, Philadelphia ("The VA"): Veterans' hospital
- Philadelphia Medical Examiner's Office
- National Board of Medical Examiners: Co-sponsor of the USMLE

=== Scientific ===
Not including the scientific departments of the local universities

- Monell Chemical Senses Center: Leader in research on smell and taste.
- University City Science Center: Focuses on commercialization.
- Wistar Institute: Leader in research on the causes and cures of disease.

=== Cultural ===
- A-Space, an anarchist community center (1991-2023)
- Books Through Bars Philadelphia, provides reading material to prisoners
- Free Library of Philadelphia, Walnut Street West Branch
- Philadanco, a professional dance company
- Spiral Q Puppet Theater, a street performance troupe
- University of Pennsylvania institutions include:
  - Annenberg Center for the Performing Arts, theaters for professional and student productions
  - Institute of Contemporary Art, Philadelphia, Penn's modern art museum
  - University of Pennsylvania Museum of Archaeology and Anthropology, also called "The Penn Museum"

=== Charitable ===
- Neighborhood Bike Works: Donates bicycles and helmets to local kids. Offers training in bicycle repair.
- Philadelphia Elwyn: Care for the mentally disabled.
- Philadelphia Ronald McDonald House: A "home away from home" for families of seriously ill children receiving treatment at nearby hospitals.

=== Legal ===
- American Law Institute: Provides Restatements of the Law.
- Dechert: Large Philadelphia law firm

=== Primary and secondary education ===
- Public (School District of Philadelphia)
  - Henry C. Lea School (K-8): 47th and Locust St.
  - Middle Years Alternative & Parkway School (6-12): 49th and Chestnut St.
  - Sadie Tanner Mossell Alexander University of Pennsylvania Partnership School (K-8): 42nd and Locust St.
  - Samuel Powel School (K-4): 36th and Powelton Ave.
  - West Philadelphia High School (9-12): 48th and Chestnut St.
- Private
  - Christ Memorial Day School (K-6): 43rd and Chestnut St.
  - HMS School for Children with Cerebral Palsy (ages 2–21): 4400 Baltimore Ave.
  - Jubilee School (pre-K-6):42nd and Chester Ave.
  - Spruce Hill Christian School (K-8): 42nd and Baltimore Ave.
  - St. Francis de Sales School (1-8): 912 S. 47th St.
  - West Philadelphia Catholic High School (9-12): 45th and Chestnut St.

== Transportation ==
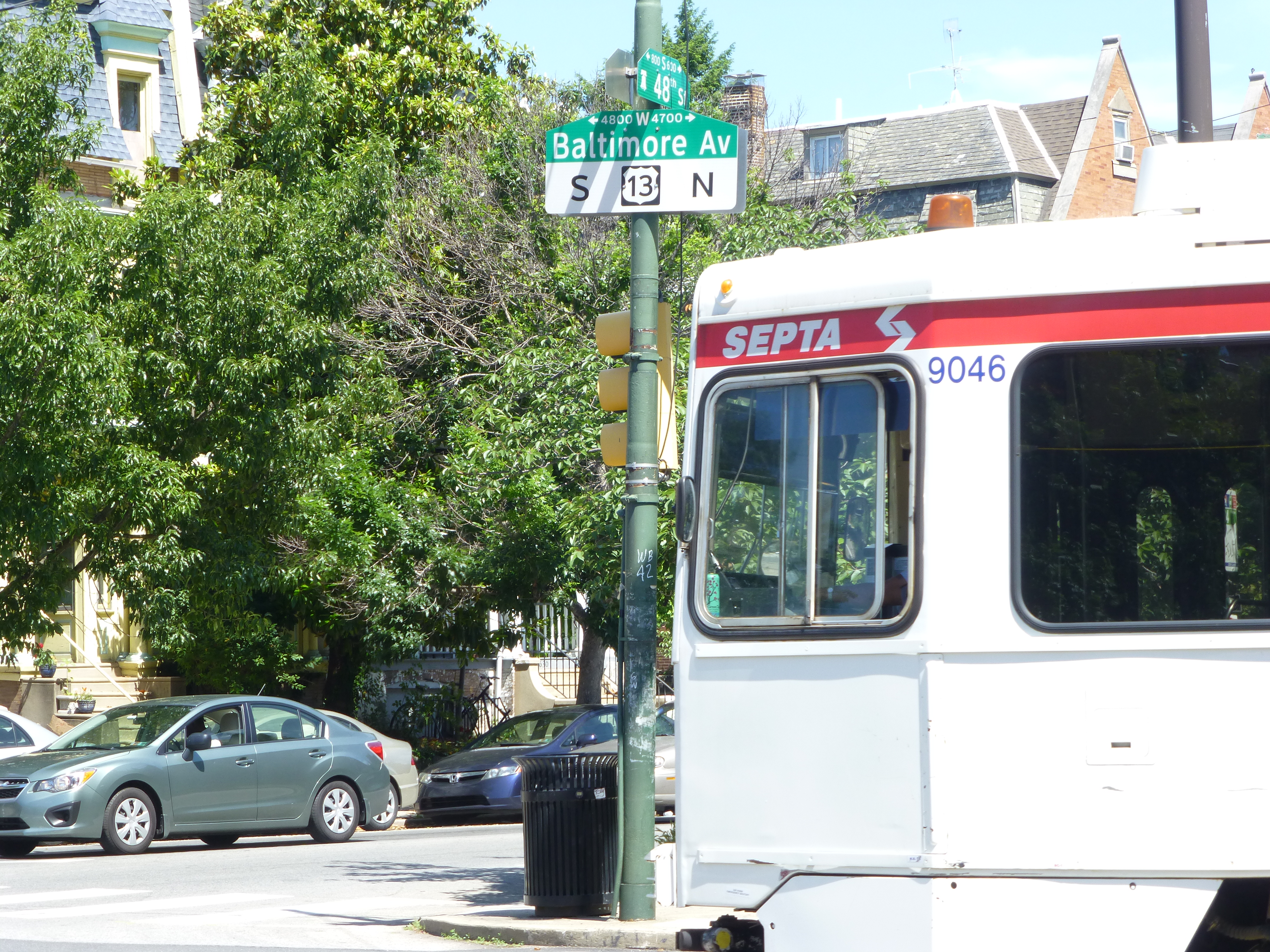
A SEPTA Subway-Surface trolley on Baltimore Ave. (US-13) at 48th St.

With its compact development and high proportion of students, many people can and do walk and bicycle around, to, and from University City. Additionally, multiple highway, rail, and bus routes pass through University City, including major intercity and regional routes.

=== Road ===
The most prominent highway through the region is the Schuylkill Expressway (I-76). I-676 from New Jersey and Center City Philadelphia terminates in University City at I-76. US-30 follows I-76 and I-676. US-13 and PA-3 follow local streets. Of historical note are the Philadelphia and Lancaster Turnpike and Baltimore Pike, now known as Lancaster Ave and Baltimore Ave. Additionally, Philadelphia's historic Market Street runs through the area, where it is known as the Avenue of Technology.

There are several bus lines that serve University City. SEPTA City Transit Division surface routes 21, 30, 40, 42, 78 are active here, as is LUCY, the "Loop through University CitY". Regional bus operators Megabus and BoltBus offer service from near 30th & JFK to NYC.

=== Rail ===
The area is served by four distinct types of passenger rail transportation: intercity, regional, metro, and trolley.

Amtrak's Northeast Corridor and Keystone Corridor intercity routes, as well as all of the SEPTA Regional Rail routes and NJT's Atlantic City Line, include a stop at 30th Street Station. SEPTA's Market–Frankford Line (MFL, also known as "the El") and Subway–Surface Trolley Lines stop at the adjacent 30th Street subway station.

There are also several other SEPTA stations in University City, including two more Regional Rail stations: Penn Medicine Station and 49th Street; three more MFL stations: 34th Street, 40th Street and 46th Street; three more underground trolley stations: 33rd Street, 36th Street, 37th Street; and two trolley portals: 36th Street Portal and 40th Street Portal. West of the portals, the trolleys run on the streets.

An elevated freight line also runs above 31st Street, with connections to several other lines at the Zoo and Arsenal Interlockings, to the north and south, respectively.

== Government representation ==
Legislative body	District	Representative	Serving since
Philadelphia City Council	3rd	Jamie Gauthier	2019
Pennsylvania State Senate	8th	Anthony H. Williams	1998
Pennsylvania House of Representatives	188th	Rick Krajewski	2021
United States House of Representatives	PA-3	Dwight Evans	2018
United States Senate	PA	Dave McCormick	2025
United States Senate	PA	John Fetterman	2023

== See also ==
- Templetown, Philadelphia – North Philadelphia neighborhood surrounding Temple University
- University Park, Pennsylvania – The Penn State University campus in central Pennsylvania
