= University City High School =

University City High School can refer to:

- University City High School (Philadelphia)
- University City High School (San Diego)
- University City High School (Missouri)
