= Innovation Plaza =

Coordinates: 39.955757°N 75.196280°W

Innovation Plaza in 2016

Innovation Plaza is a pocket park in the University City section Philadelphia, Pennsylvania, located in the 37th Street corridor that features a innovators walk of fame for various scientists including Jen Bartik who worked on the ENIAC and others. The park was dedicated in December 2015. The park is a collaborative effort between various organizations and the Science Center to come up with a design that caters to the diverse cultures in the area.
