= National Association of Secondary School Principals =

Other organization in Reston, United States

The National Association of Secondary School Principals (NASSP) is a national organization of and voice for middle level and high school principals, assistant principals, and aspiring school leaders from across the United States and more than 45 countries around the world. The association currently serves more than 27,000 members.

== History ==
In existence since 1916, NASSP's mission is to promote excellence in school leadership. In February 2011 the organization replaced its old logo. The new logo returns to the initials NASSP and adopts the tagline "Leading Schools". The association is now extending its support of the principal by providing resources and professional development for the whole leadership team.

NASSP aims to help advance middle level and high school education by promoting high professional standards, focusing attention on school leaders' challenges, providing a "national voice" for school leaders, building public confidence in education, strengthening the role of the principal as instructional leader, and publicizing the issues and interests of members in the news media.

== School reform ==
In 2011 NASSP released Breaking Ranks: The Comprehensive Framework for School Improvement, which emphasizes flexibility and adaptability to different school contexts and aims to foster a customized solution unique to each school to improve student achievement. Student success is directly related to long-term school improvement efforts, so this framework is readily applicable to any grade level, K–12. This is the sixth publication of the Breaking Ranks series.

NASSP annually recognizes principals, assistant principals, schools, students, and advisers from across the country for their leadership and for making positive, significant differences in schools and communities.

== Student programs ==
NASSP promotes the intellectual growth, academic achievement, character and leadership development, and physical well-being of youth. The association founded and administers the following student leadership programs to further these goals.

=== NHS/NJHS ===
The National Honor Society (NHS) and National Junior Honor Society (NJHS) are the nation's leading organizations established to recognize outstanding high school and middle-level students. NHS and NJHS serve to honor those students who have demonstrated excellence in the areas of scholarship, leadership, service, and character (and citizenship for NJHS). These characteristics have been associated with membership in the organization since their beginnings in 1921 and 1929. NASSP is the parent organization for both NHS and NJHS.

=== NEHS ===
The National Elementary Honor Society (NEHS) was established in 2008 by NASSP in cooperation with the National Association of Elementary School Principals (NAESP) to recognize elementary students in both public and non-public elementary schools for their outstanding academic achievement and demonstrated personal responsibility, to provide meaningful service to the school and community, and to develop essential leadership skills in the students of elementary schools.

=== NatStuCo ===
The National Student Council (NatStuCo), formerly the National Association of Student Councils (NASC), was established in 1931 with the goal of helping middle level and high school student councils become more effective organizations. NatStuCo seeks to provide a valuable leadership partnership between students and their school. It creates the opportunity for students to become effective leaders, thus encouraging and influencing a positive school climate.

NatStuCo is a program of NASSP. Its operation and administration are at the national office in Reston, VA. An Advisory Committee—whose membership includes students, advisers, and principals appointed by the NASSP Board of Directors—provides input and advice to NatStuCo staff.

NatStuCo seeks to promote civil service among students within the school and community. The organization provides leadership training for student council members and advisers.

Each year, NatStuCo hosts a national conference for activities directors and students across the country. The conference features youth motivational speakers and workshop presenters.

== School programs ==
=== Breakthrough Schools ===
In 2007, NASSP received a grant from MetLife Foundation and merged two programs, Breakthrough High Schools and Bridge Builders, to form Breakthrough Schools. Previously, the Breakthrough High Schools program recognized schools that were defying the odds and succeeding despite predictors of low student achievement. The Bridge Builders program recognized middle level and high school principals who had implemented proven strategies to create connections between their faculty and surrounding communities. From 2008 to 2014, Breakthrough Schools program annually recognized 10 US middle and high schools that serve large numbers of students living in poverty and are high achieving or dramatically improving student achievement.

Although the program was paused in 2015 and 2016, in 2017, NASSP reevaluated the 39 Breakthrough Schools recognized between 2011 and 2014 and found that 26 of the schools had continuously sustained their student achievement, and redesignated them as Breakthrough Schools.

Winners are chosen based on a school's documented success in implementing strategies aligned with the three core areas of NASSP's school improvement model, the Breaking Ranks Framework. The core areas include collaborative leadership; personalization; and curriculum, instruction, and assessment.

More specifically, nominated schools must demonstrate continuous growth on state assessments (and improved graduation rates among high schools), efforts to reduce the achievement gap, and have a student body consisting of 40% or more eligible for free or reduced price meals. Additional factors impacting consideration include equity of student participation in challenging courses, personal learning plans for all students, school/community connections, and leadership development/mentoring.

From 2008 to 2014, selected schools received a $5,000 grant and were featured in the association's monthly magazine, Principal Leadership. Principals of Breakthrough Schools participated in professional development activities and the annual NASSP conference. In 2017, all schools received a plaque and banner, four of the principals were selected to attend the National Principals Conference, and another six principals participated in the McKinsey Management Program for School Leaders.

=== Principal of the Year Honorees ===
- 2023, Donna Hayard, Haddam Killingworth High School, Higganum, CT
- 2022, Beth Huff, Fulton Middle School, Fulton, MO
- 2021, Richard Gordon, Paul Robeson High School for Human Services, Philadelphia
- 2020, Kerensa Wing, Collins Hill High School, Suwanee, GA
- 2019, Lucas Clamp, River Bluff High School, Lexington, South Carolina
- 2018, Akil E. Ross, Chapin High School, Chapin, South Carolina
- 2017, Tom Dodd, Lesher Middle School, Fort Collins, CO
- 2016, Alan Tenreiro, Cumberland High School, Cumberland, RI
- 2015, Jayne Ellspermann, West Port High School, Ocala, FL
- 2014, Sheila Harrity, Worcester Technical High School, Worcester, MA

== See also ==
- Secondary education in the United States
