= National Junior Honor Society =

International student organization for middle schoolers

- NJHS
- Founded: 1929; 97 years ago Webster Groves High School
- Type: Honor
- Affiliation: National Association of Secondary School Principals
- Status: Active
- Emphasis: Middle School
- Scope: International
- Pillars: Leadership, Citizenship, Character, Service, and Scholarship
- Headquarters: 1904 Association Drive; Reston, Virginia 20191-1537; United States
- Website: njhs.us

The National Junior Honor Society (NJHS) is an American international student organization with chapters in middle schools. The NJHS was founded by the National Association of Secondary School Principals, and today has chapters in the United States, the U.S. territories, and around the world. The National Junior Honor Society recognizes middle-school students who exemplify the qualities of scholarship, service, leadership, citizenship, and character. Additionally, the organization offers a variety of educational opportunities designed to enhance students' academic and personal development.

== History ==
The National Junior Honor Society (NJHS) was established by the National Association of Secondary School Principals in 1929. The NJHS was established "to create enthusiasm for scholarship; to stimulate a desire to render service; to promote leadership; to encourage responsible citizenship; and to develop character in the students of secondary schools." The first chapter was established in Webster Groves High School in Webster Groves, Missouri.

Its headquarters are located at 1904 Association Drive in Reston, Virginia.

== Core Values ==
The society's five standards or pillars are leadership, citizenship, character, service, and scholarship.

== Membership ==
Membership is based on "outstanding scholarship, character, leadership, service, and citizenship." Once selected, these members have the responsibility to demonstrate these qualities. Potential candidates must be in sixth to ninth grade and in the second semester. For the scholarship standard, the student scholar must have a minimum grade point average (GPA) of 3.0 from a scale of 4.0. This, however, can vary between schools. Candidates are judged and selected by a majority vote of the Faculty Council.

== Governance ==
The NJHS is governed by the NJHS National Constitution. The NJHS is controlled by the NASSP Board of Directors, who are advised by the Student Leadership Advisory Committee. Members of this committee serve terms no longer than two years. Any secondary public school can apply for a local chapter. Schools which have been chartered like so can organize state organizations.

On a chapter basis, the principal of the school possesses many powers, including the power to approve all decisions of the chapter. The principal also appoints a chapter adviser and a Faculty Council composed of five members. The chapter adviser is responsible for the day-to-day supervision of the chapter. The Faculty Council develops procedures for the selection, discipline, and dismissal of members. Everything done by a chapter must be in compliance with the NJHS National Constitution.

== See also ==
- Student society
