= University City High School (Philadelphia) =

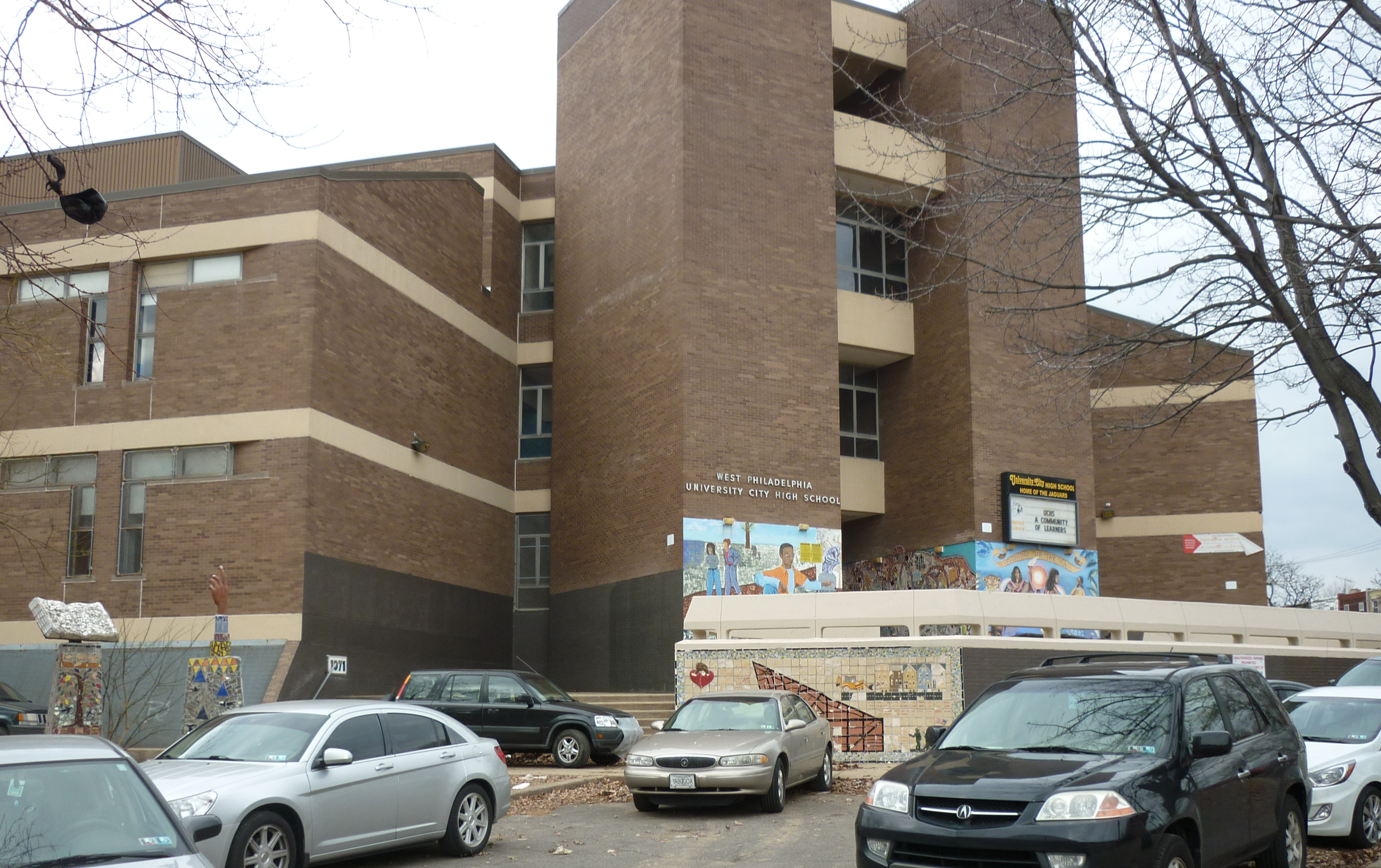

Location
- 3601 Filbert Street; Philadelphia, PA 19104; United States; 39.9570°N 75.1940°W

Information
- Type: Public
- Opened: 1972
- Closed: 2013
- School district: School District of Philadelphia
- NCES School ID: 421899006523
- Grades: 9 to 12
- Enrollment: 637 (2010–2011)
- Campus size: 14 acres
- Campus type: Urban
- Colors: Black and gold
- Team name: Jaguars
- Website: University City High School

University City High School was a public secondary school in the University City section of West Philadelphia, Pennsylvania, United States, which operated from 1972 to 2013.

The school was planned for as part of a 1960s urban renewal project. It was designed as a large comprehensive high school to serve 3000 students in grades nine through twelve. Twenty-five percent of the school's capacity was reserved for an elite math and science magnet program that would draw students from throughout the city. The remaining seventy-five percent was for students from the school's local catchment area.

In addition to the magnet program, the school's educational program included a wide range of courses from college prep to vocational education subjects like industrial arts and home economics. The school's building was designed by H2L2 and included advanced educational, vocational, and recreational facilities, on a 14-acre urban campus.

Despite the best intentions of its planners, the school failed to prosper. Also, the school was not able to meet grade requirements, once its only honor role students graduated. Enrollment in 2010–2011 was 637 students. That same year, it became a Promise Academy, offering extra enrichment as well as replenishing the staff to accommodate a better education for all students.

The school was one of twenty-three School District of Philadelphia schools closed in 2013 by the School Reform Commission. The building was demolished in 2015 as part of a $1B redevelopment project.

== Background ==
Between the early 1900s and the 1960s, the area where this school was built was known as Black Bottom or simply "the bottom". As the name suggests, the area was primarily populated by poor African Americans. In contrast, the largely white and affluent University of Pennsylvania (Penn) was located nearby.

In 1959, Penn led a group of local institutions to create the West Philadelphia Corporation (WPC), which had the legal power to take land under eminent domain and the financial and political support of the local and federal governments.

The WPC developed plans to clear most of Black Bottom and build a science center and a high school. Naturally, this led to conflict with the existing residents, and the plans were significantly revised. Ultimately the neighborhood was razed for redevelopment. Estimates of the number of displaced people vary from 2,500 to 10,000.

The name "University City" was widely used in this area after these and other major redevelopment efforts.

== Planning ==
On April 30, 1966, the US Department of Housing and Urban Development announced it had approved a grant of almost $13 billion to the Redevelopment Authority (RDA). The University City Science Center submitted development and marketing proposals to the RDA in July 1965, and the City Council held a public hearing on October 14, 1965 to discuss these plans. Due to this new development, 250 citizens living in the West Philadelphia area formed a Citizens Committee of University City, Area3. They protested against the government taking homes from West Philadelphia to build science centers and other construction that benefitted the universities in the area (University of Pennsylvania and Drexel University). As the issue became more and more public, students and faculty members of the universities in the area got involved in protests with the community against the government. The key, they said, was collaboration.

The people in the center wanted to create a high school that reflected new approaches to education. ES'70 Cycle I (An Educational System for the Seventies) was created to help change overcrowding, low test scores, and generally improve Philadelphia's high schools. Through this system, three new high schools were built, reflecting a traditional comprehensive school challenging the new advances of technology in the 70s.

The district, community, and universities of West Philadelphia argued to make UCHS a math and science magnet school. The most gifted (mostly white students at the time) students were eligible to attend. UCHS was created to represent a new approach to learning in urban education, new in the sense that it would utilize the latest education, technology, and community resources to provide a meaningful individual program for each student, regardless of race or economic background. It aimed to create a college-based environment before entering college.

== Early struggles ==
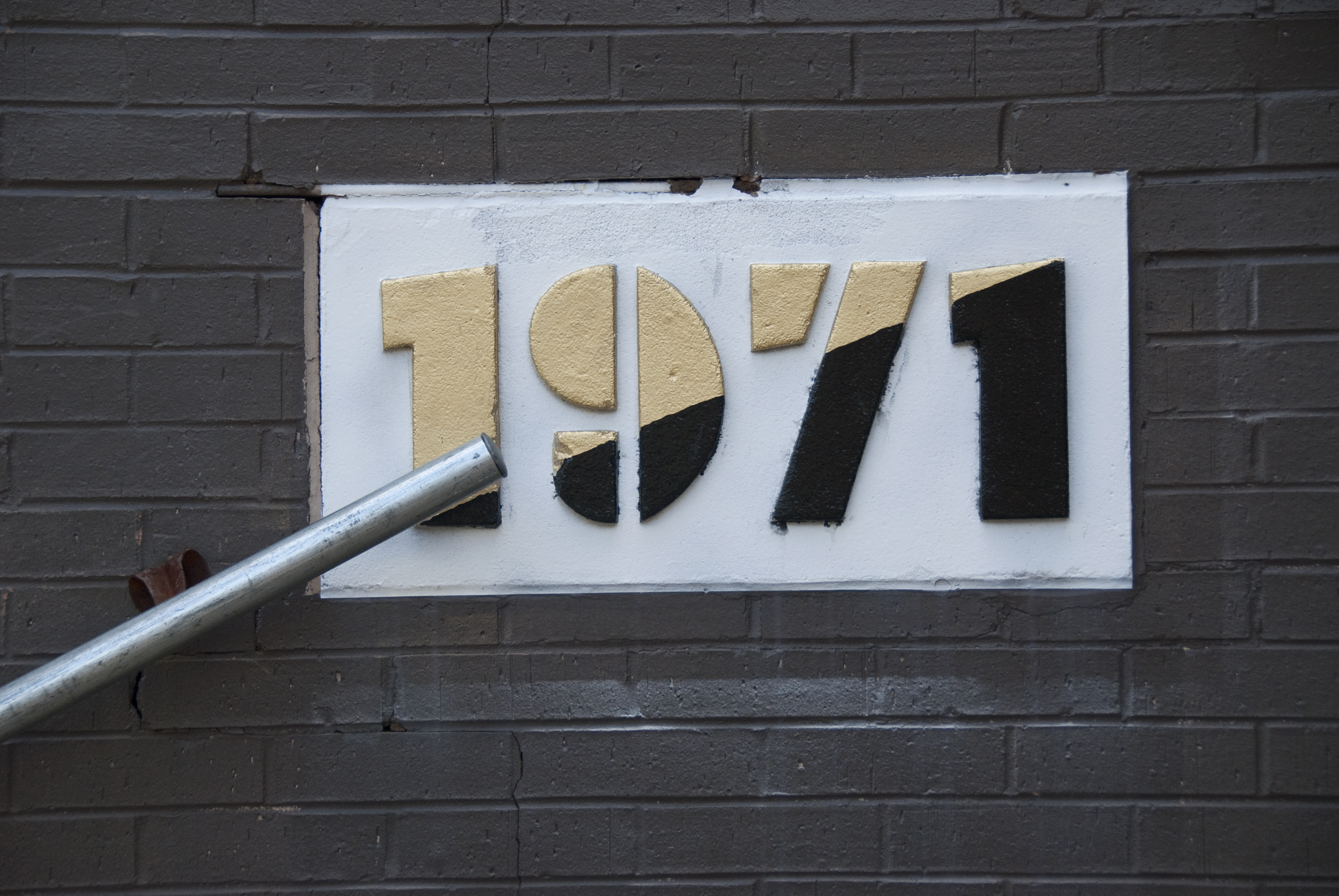
UCHS 1971 cornerstone, painted in the school colors, contained a time capsule.

UCHS' first day of school was Dec, 10, 1971. It was opened as a regular high school (not the original mission) because the curriculum and teachers were not ready, and construction of the school was continuously delayed, pushing the opening date to December. The first cohort of students at UCHS were exclusively ninth graders, and the school expanded grade by grade until it reached its full 9-12 grade range in 1976. The building was designed for a capacity of 3,000 students, but on the first day of school only a few hundred students had been identified by their sending schools. Since other high schools in West Philadelphia were overcrowded, by February the school numbers rose as new students were transferred to University City High School. The school's mission was lost due to gang-related crimes. There was no structure or discipline from the beginning, allowing the students to get out of control. The initial mission of the school was implemented with the creation in 1973 of the Individualized Study Program (ISP) as an alternative school program open to students from throughout Philadelphia. This program only lasted through the end of the 1976-77 school year, when the School District of Philadelphia suspended funding for ISP and most other alternative schools in the city.

During the 1980s, University City High School was known for its racial clashes and tension among black and Asian students. There were incidents of stabbings and massive brawls inside and outside the school grounds. Drug abuse also increased. According to the "Standing up for their school and neighborhood" article written by Martha Woodall on February 3, 1986, a speaker from the Wharton School Busch Center brought in to talk to the students stated that "You [meaning the UCHS school community] are going to lose more people in one year from drug overdoses than all the lynchings in history." In 1994, school security was increased to help reduce the violence. School officials also created a single lunch period at the end of the day, brought in Chicago police officers to speak to the students about violence, and started a peer mediation/conflict resolution program.

== Demise ==
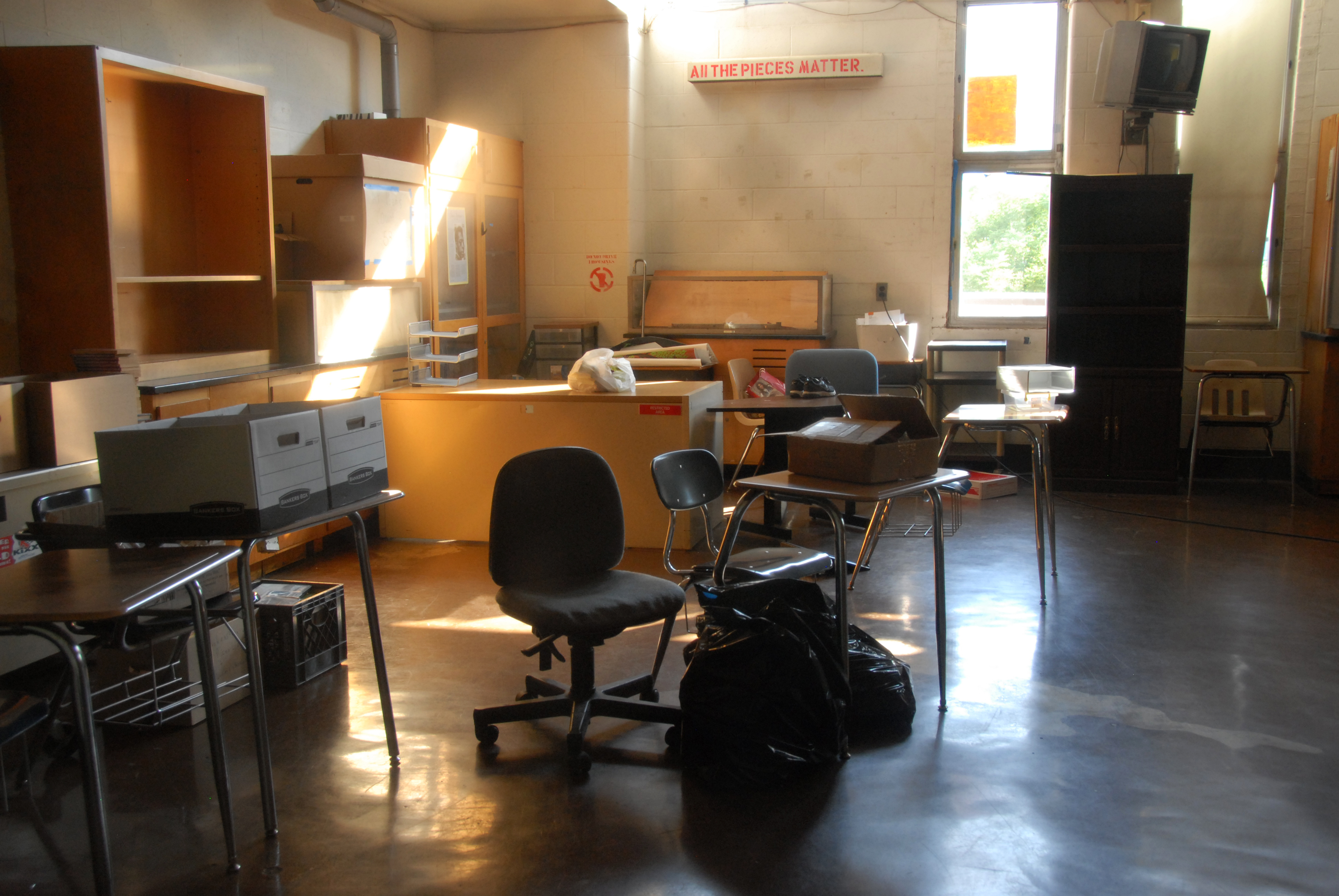
An empty third floor classroom in June 2013 (after the school was closed). A sign reads: "ALL THE PIECES MATTER."

During the twenty-first century, University City High school struggled to keep up with the required test scores of the Philadelphia school district system. In 2009-2010 it became a Promise Academy school.

An additional hour was implemented to support academic and social enrichment. While other high schools were released at 3 p.m, UCHS Promise Academy students left school at 4 p.m. The extra hour was in place so that students could participate in a sports or club as well as receive additional help or tutoring from staff to ensure students were well-rounded and successful. There were a handful of community groups and organizations that provided assistance to the school through the change initiative.

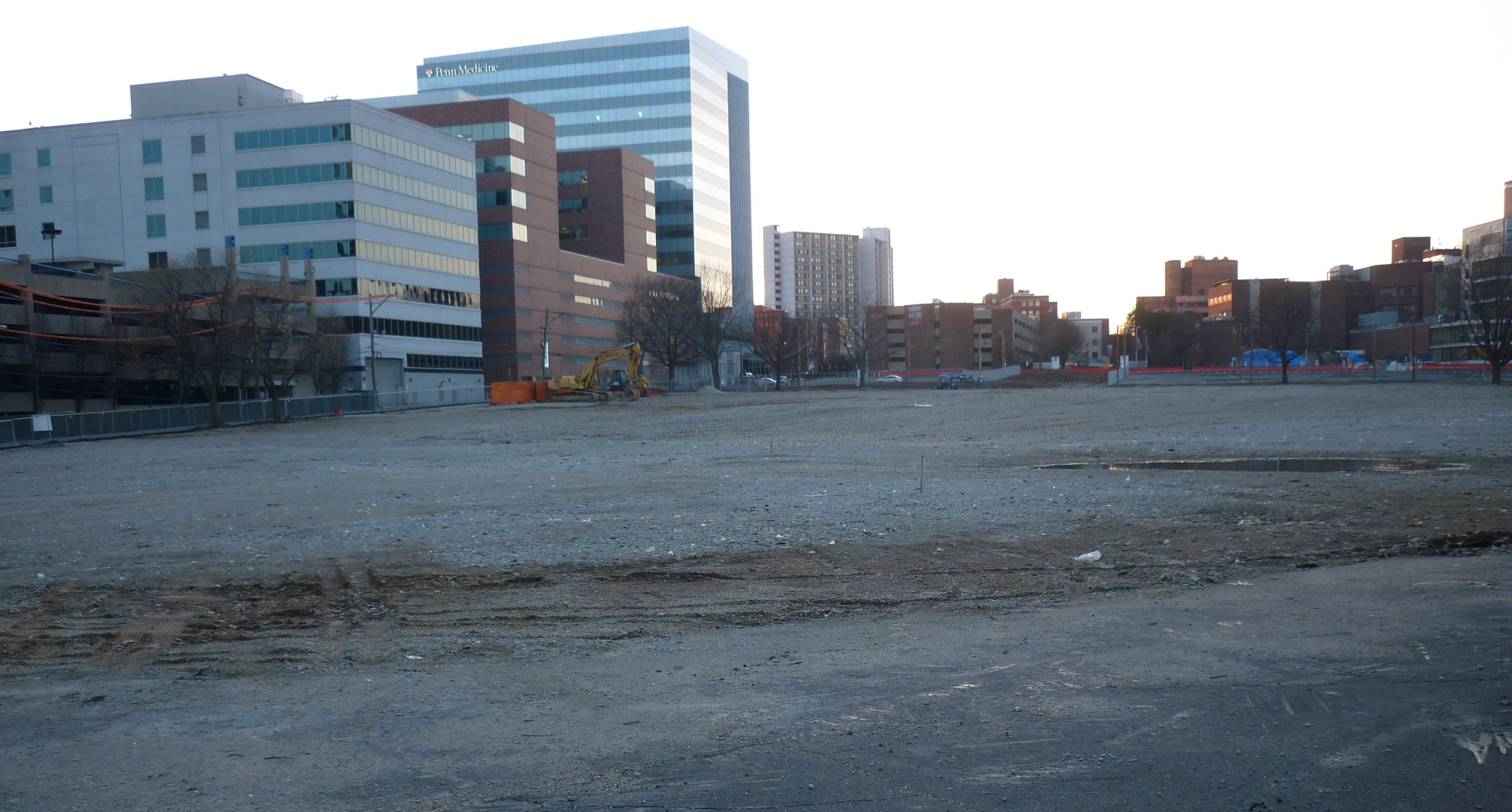
The empty lot in 2016, where UCHS once stood

The Student Success Center played a huge role in providing and coordinating services to each student. The main focus of SSC was to provide students with academic and social advancement. Located in the basement of UCHS, the SSC Staff provided resources to help students achieve their post-secondary education goals. Students from all grades were provided with help with career planning, the college planning and application process, internships, jobs, academic support, and college decisions and visits. Throughout the academic school year, student interns from the University of Pennsylvania and Drexel University partnered with the SSC to provide academic resources to students.

On March 7, 2013, the Philadelphia School Reform Commission voted to close University City High School. Displaced students were enrolled in Paul Robeson High School for Human Services, Microsoft's School of the Future, and Benjamin Franklin High School.

== Extracurricular activities ==
Boys' sports: football, flag football, basketball, soccer, volleyball, badminton, cross country, track and field, baseball

Girls' sports: cheerleading, soccer, volleyball, badminton, cross-country, track and field, softball

- Arabic Club
- Spanish club
- Dance Club: Modern and African
- Yearbook Committee
- Double-Dutch Club
- Newspaper Club
- Leaders of Change: Social and Educational Entrepreneurship
- Poetry Slam Club
- Peer Group Connections was a leadership and mentoring program. A group of seniors and juniors worked with partners to teach and mentor 9th grade advisories once a week. The goal was to provide guidance through the first year of high school.

Among the sports offered at University City High School were track and field, soccer, football, dance, basketball, volleyball, and swimming.

== Programs ==
- 1996: a modeling afterschool program partnered with UCHS.
- 1997: a work roster was created for students to work at jobs or internships in the morning.
- 1997-2003: UC Graphics & Multimedia, an in-house web development and graphics design program, was started by Michael Brennan who was a technology teacher. Students were taught graphics design, web development, programming, and entrepreneurial skills. The program was sponsored through a grant by the Coca-Cola Company and strongly supported by Dr. James "Torch" Lytle, the principal of UCHS at the time. Students developed websites for local businesses within the University City area and the program gained national recognition from USA Today in 1998. UC Graphics & Multimedia was one of the first school programs of its kind to be started in America. Some notable clients include The University of Pennsylvania, Habitat for Humanity, and the Paul Robeson House. The program ended in 2003 due to change of leadership and direction.
- Due to high pregnancy rates in 1997, a daycare center was added to help teenage mothers and fathers at UCHS.
- 1997-8: A program called Twilight was created for students seventeen years and older who were not on track to graduate in time or had been in high school for too long. It was a fifteen-week program from 3 p.m. to 5 p.m., offering five courses.
- 1998: there were block schedules, which consisted of 90-minute classes and two semesters per year.
