= Black Bottom, Philadelphia =

Historical neighborhood in Philadelphia, PA

Black Bottom
- Historical neighborhood
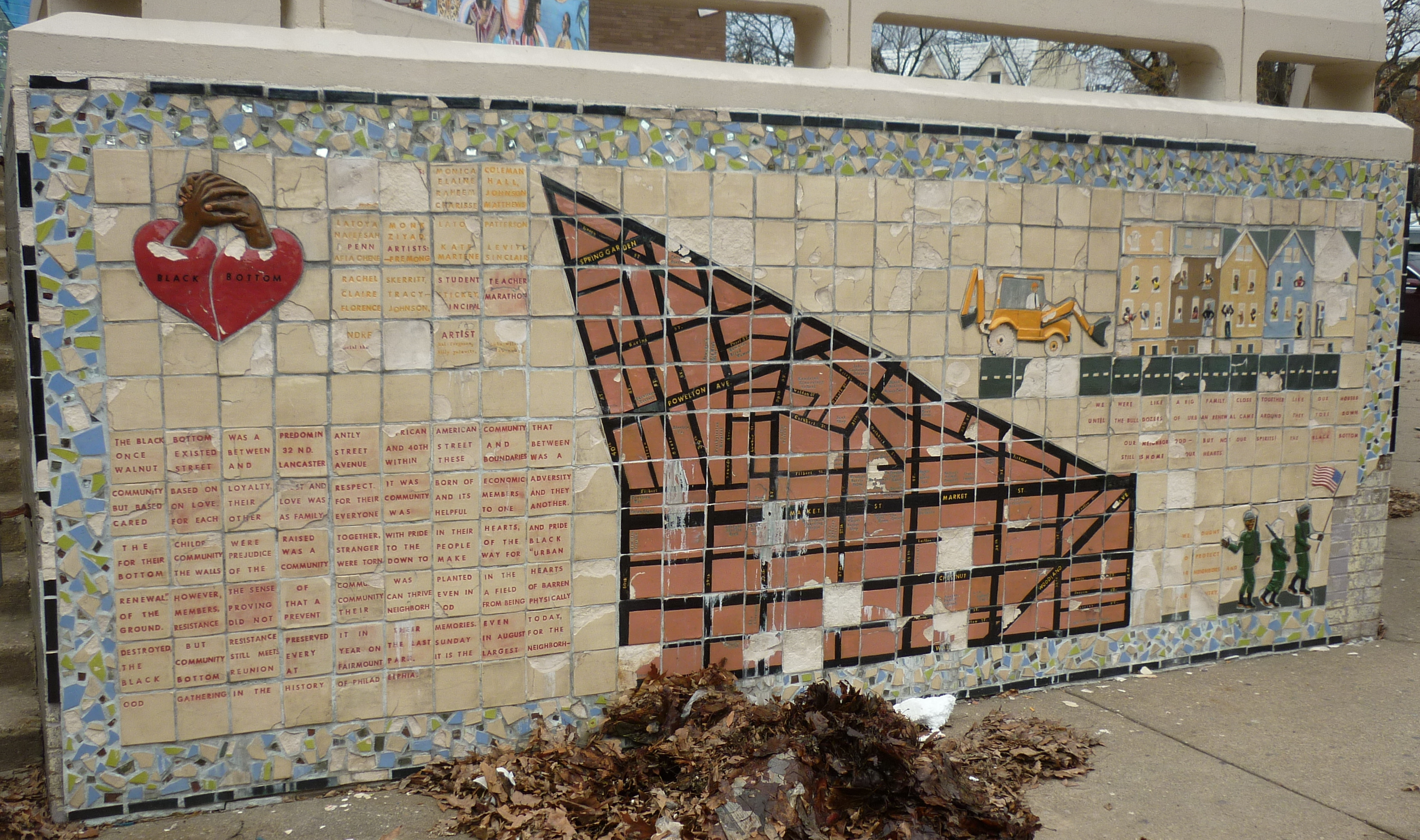
- Mosaic depicting Black Bottom at University City High School
- Interactive map of Black Bottom
- Coordinates: 39.9574°N 75.1978°W
- Country: United States
- State: Pennsylvania
- City: Philadelphia
- Time zone: UTC-5 (Eastern Time)
  - Summer (DST): UTC-4 (Eastern Daylight Time)

Black Bottom was a predominantly African American and poor neighborhood in West Philadelphia, Pennsylvania. It was mostly razed for urban renewal in the 1960s.

== Location ==
Black Bottom sat between 40th and 32nd streets in West Philadelphia. Sources disagree on its northern and southern boundaries, but the neighborhood is generally understood to have been north and separate from the campus of the University of Pennsylvania and south of the Mantua and Powelton Village neighborhoods. At least one source says "Black Bottom" was understood to mean blocks south of Lancaster Avenue, while blocks north of it were referred to as "the Bottom".

Before it was called Black Bottom, the area was once part of or overlapped places called Blockley, Hamilton Village, West Philadelphia Borough, and Greenville. Following the displacement of thousands of residents in the 1960s, the area is now considered to be a part of West Philadelphia's University City.

== History ==
In the decades preceding Philadelphia's consolidation in 1854, the area was home to taverns and businesses catering largely to the stagecoach and cattle droving trades. After the Civil War, it developed into one of West Philadelphia's affluent streetcar suburbs. The University of Pennsylvania moved there in 1870. After World War I, wealthier residents moved further west into West Philadelphia and its suburbs, leaving neighborhoods in eastern West Philadelphia in decline. The relative availability of cheap housing in the area attracted many African Americans, including migrants from the Southern States, who faced housing discrimination elsewhere in the city.

=== Urban renewal ===
The University of Pennsylvania had expanded as far north as Walnut Street by 1920, but in 1959, Penn, Drexel University, University of the Sciences in Philadelphia, and Presbyterian Hospital sought to create large-scale redevelopment in the area to eradicate blight and develop a University City neighborhood of residences and services for students, faculty and staff. Together, they created the West Philadelphia Corporation and acquired large numbers of properties for demolition.

The first major clash between Black Bottom residents and the white institutions came in 1963, over the plans to build a science magnet high school on 7.6 acres of land in Unit 3 between 36th and 38th Streets, along Market Street (Reid et al, 1997). Black residents believed that very few of their children would gain entrance to the magnet school, which was being designed for the children of the faculty, staff, and graduate students of Penn and Drexel. Construction of the magnet school, to be called University City High School, would also displace families and individuals living in that section of Area 3.

Portions of the area were eventually declared blighted by the city, and remaining properties were purchased by eminent domain. The final buildings were demolished by the late 1960s. The number of displaced residents is estimated between 4,496 and 15,000 by various sources.

Former Black Bottom residents celebrate Black Bottom Day on the last Saturday in August in Fairmount Park.

== See also ==
- University City Science Center
- University City High School (Philadelphia)
- Nearby neighborhoods:
  - Walnut Hill
  - Spruce Hill
