= Paul Robeson High School for Human Services =

Coordinates: 39.9570°N 75.2057°W

Location
- 4125 Ludlow Street; Philadelphia, Pennsylvania 19104; United States

Information
- Type: Public high school
- School district: The School District of Philadelphia
- Principal: Richard Gordon
- Staff: 16.35 (FTE)
- Grades: 9–12
- Enrollment: 314 (2022–23)
- Student to teacher ratio: 19.20
- Website: Paul Robeson High School for Human Services

Paul Robeson High School for Human Services is a district-run high school in Philadelphia with citywide admissions. The school is one of eight schools in the country that offers a focus in the human services field. The school is named after Paul Robeson.

As part of Philadelphia's shutdown of 23 district-run schools in 2013, some displaced students from University City High School were relocated to Paul Robeson High School for Human Services.
