= Avenue of Technology (Philadelphia) =

- Neighborhood of Philadelphia
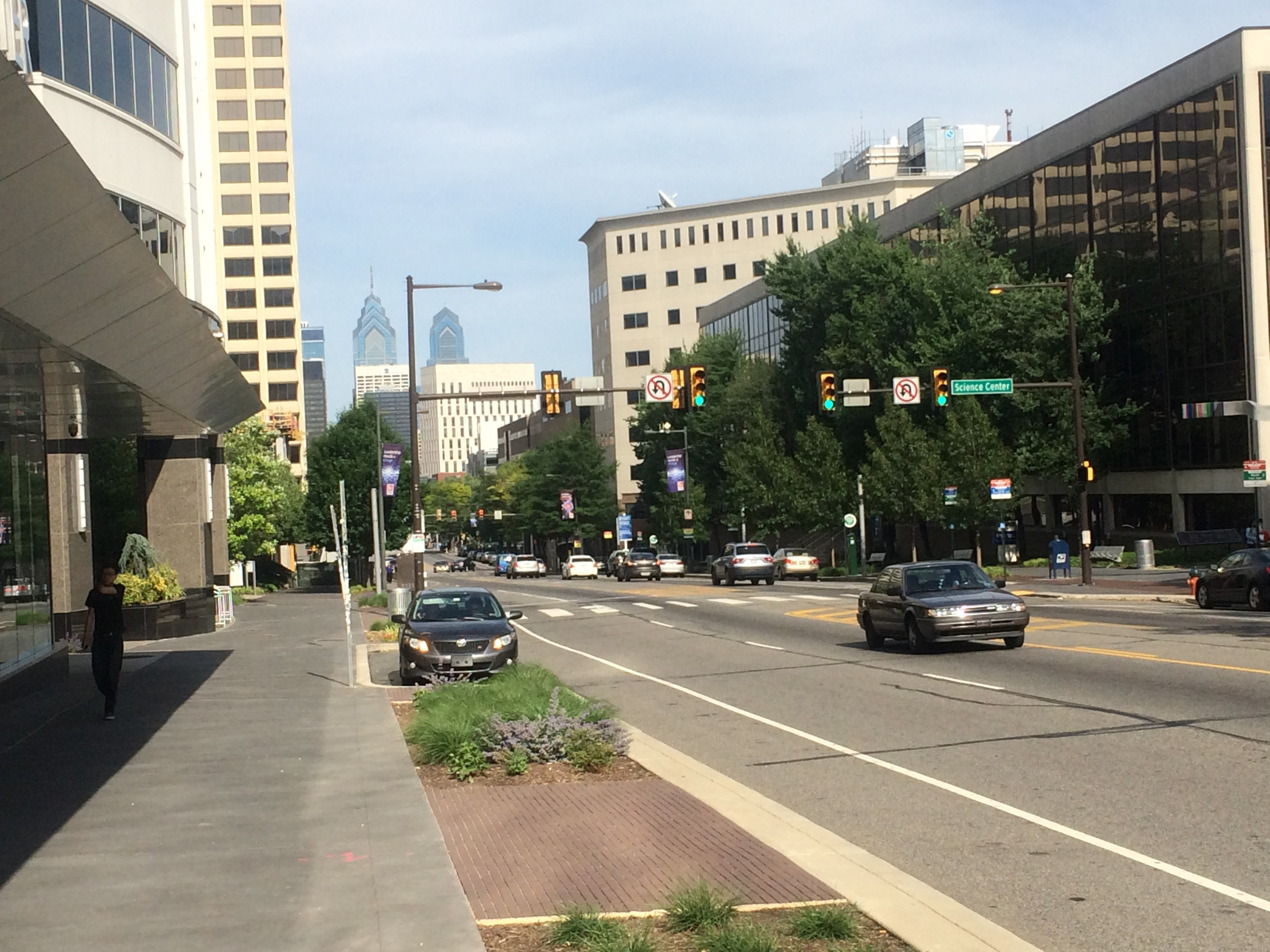
- University City Science Center on the Avenue of Technology

- Location within Philadelphia
- Country: United States
- State: Pennsylvania
- County: Philadelphia
- City: Philadelphia
- ZIP Code: 19104
- Area codes: 215, 267 and 445

The Avenue of Technology is a city designated technology-based district which is located on a segment of Market Street in Philadelphia, Pennsylvania, United States. The area is known for being the "portal of technology" of the city that includes the University City Science Center and Drexel University.

== History ==
The area was originally dedicated by then mayor Ed Rendell, with street plates acknowledging this section of road with turquoise signs.

In May 2014, a project with Google Earth was launched to document the mobility in the region.

== Gallery ==
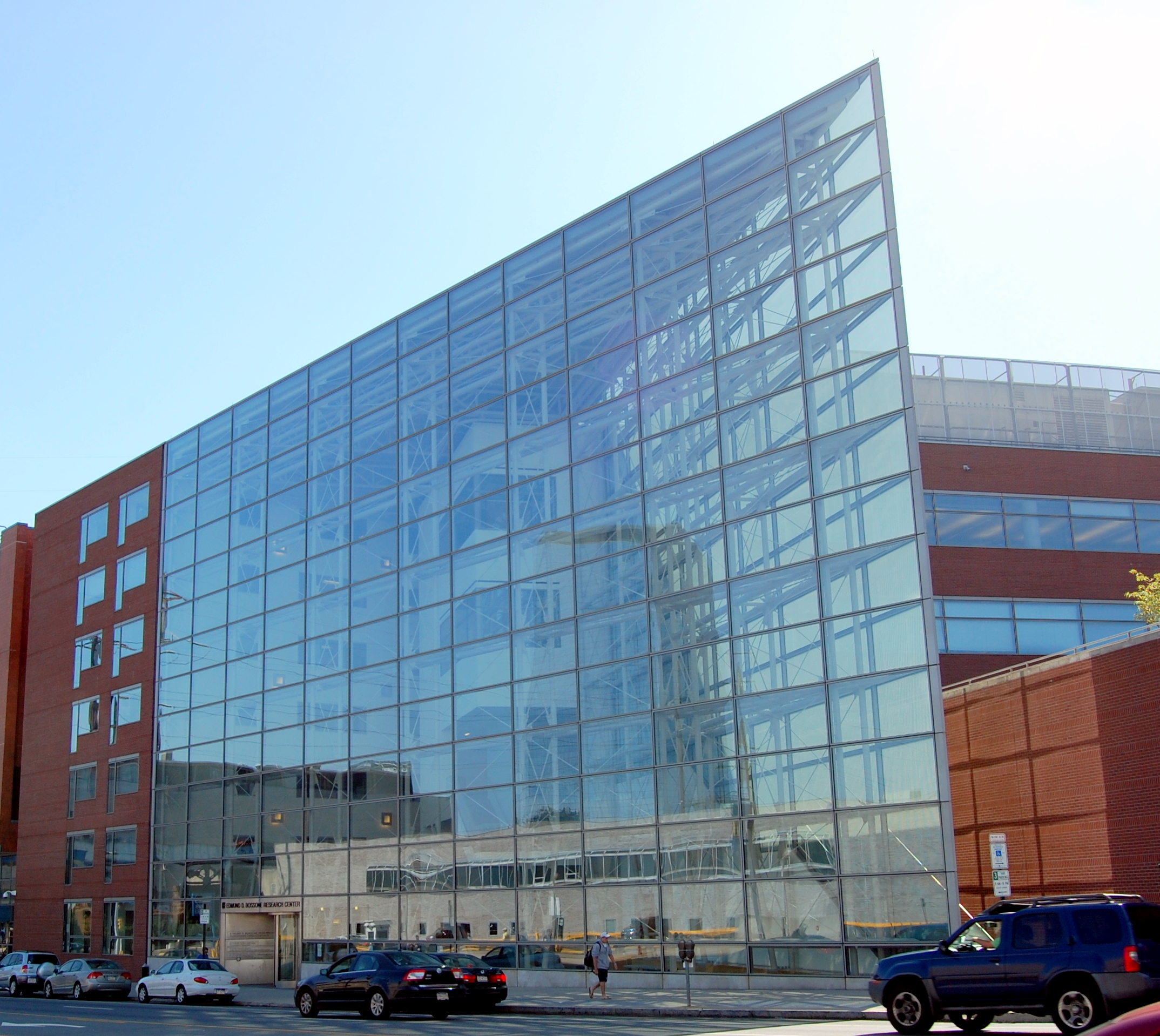
Edmund D. Bossone Research Center, located on the Avenue of Technology

== See also ==
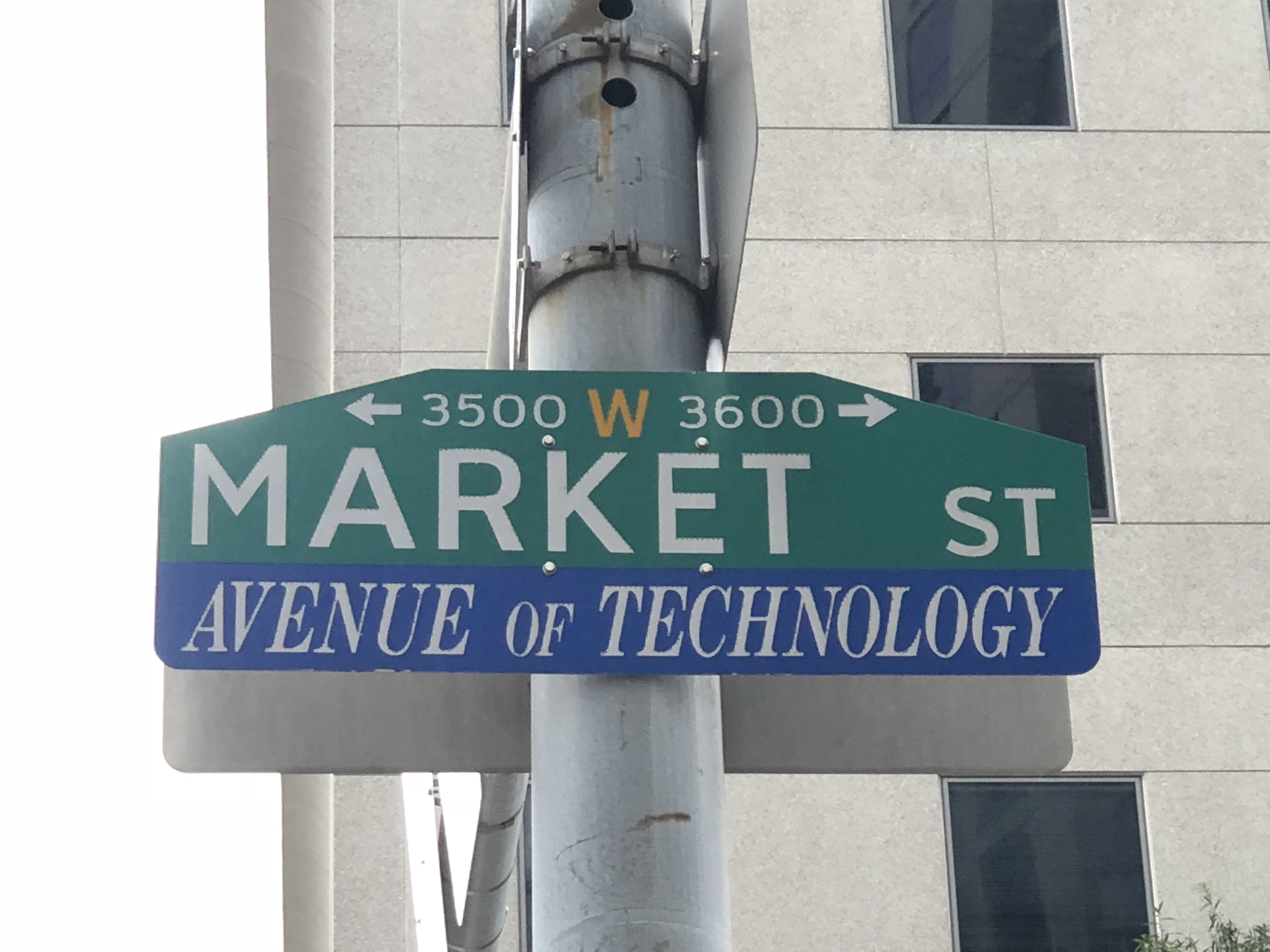
Avenue of Technology

- Market Street
- Avenue of the Arts, also designated by former Mayor Ed Rendell
