= University City Science Center =

Urban research park in Philadelphia, United States

Coordinates: 39.956775°N 75.196945°W

- Established: 1963
- Interim CEO: Kerry Benson
- Address: 3675 Market Street, Philadelphia, Pennsylvania, U.S.
- Location: University City, Philadelphia, Pennsylvania, U.S.
- Website: sciencecenter.org

The University City Science Center today is a non-profit innovation intermediary that drives economic growth locally and advances transformative healthcare solutions globally in Philadelphia, Pennsylvania, United States.

The Science Center was established in 1963, within the demolished Black Bottom neighborhood of Philadelphia (now known as University City). The Science Center was the first established urban research park in the United States. Today it offers startup support services, and serves as a convener of the innovation community. Additionally, the Science Center builds inclusive STEM pathways for Philadelphia youth via the award-winning FirstHand program™. It aims to catalyze Philadelphia’s entrepreneurs and accelerate technology innovation that addresses society’s biggest healthcare challenges.

In 2023 the Science Center launched its Capital Readiness Program – a due-diligence bootcamp that equips health tech, medtech, and digital health startups with investor insights and fundraising strategies. By May 2026, the program had supported 100+ companies, driving over $143M in capital across 11 cohorts.

In January 2026, the Science Center was awarded a $300,000 grant from Genentech, a member of the Roche Group, to support activities aligned with the Science Center Translation Project™ - designed to close the gap between breakthrough innovation and patient impact.

An independent 2023 study reported that companies that have benefited from the Science Center's business incubation services have created more than 29,000 jobs in the Greater Philadelphia region and contribute $7.6 billion to the regional economy annually.

== Location ==
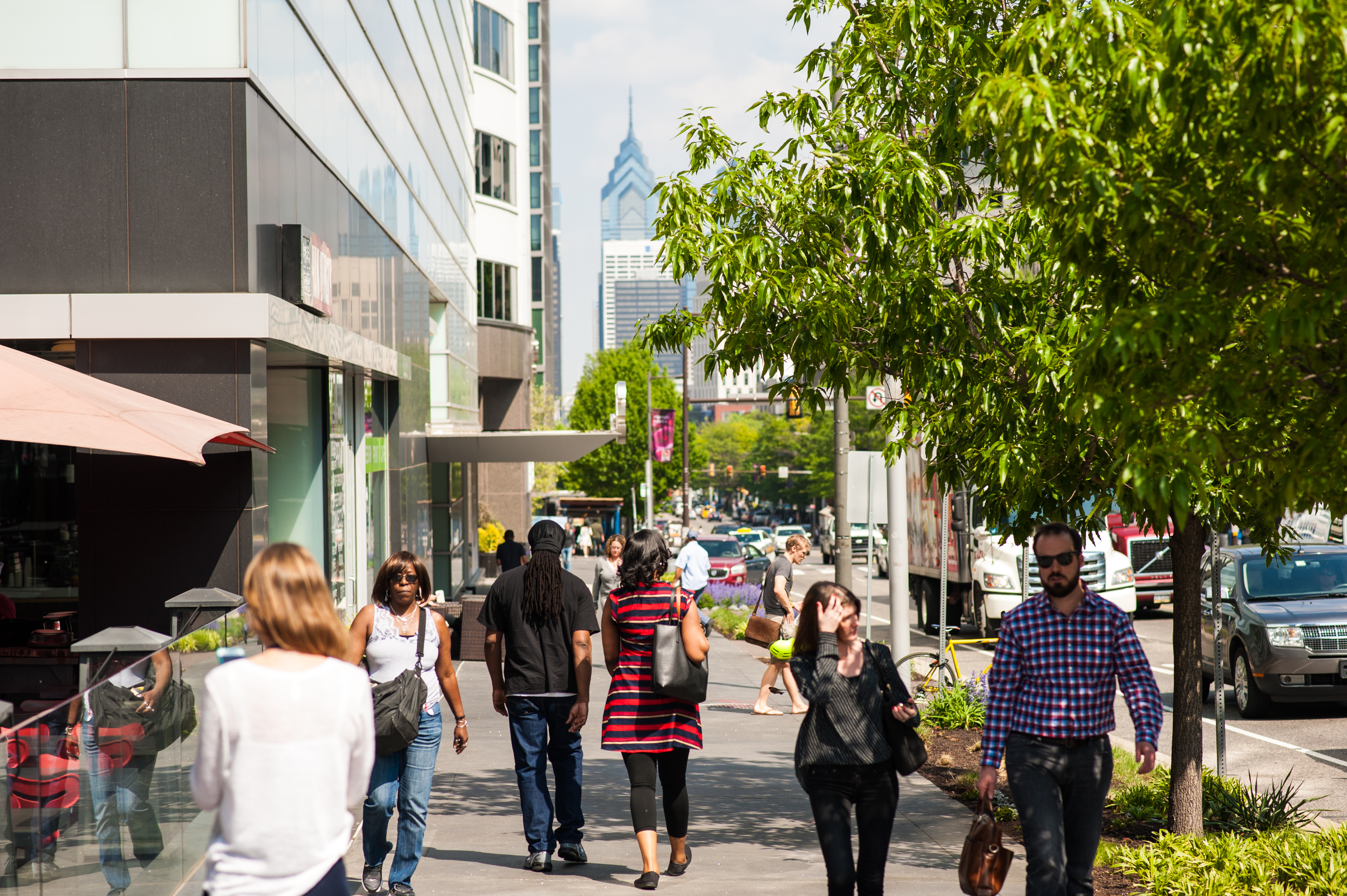
University City Science Center on the Avenue of Technology on Market Street

The Science Center, in partnership with Wexford Science + Technology and Ventas, Inc operates a 27-acre campus called uCity Square, made up of 17 buildings along Market Street in University City, West Philadelphia. In 2015, the campus was re-branded to uCity Square. The campus is located near Drexel University, the University of Pennsylvania, University of the Sciences, Children's Hospital of Philadelphia, and the Wistar Institute. All but one building have been constructed in accordance with the Philadelphia Redevelopment Authority.

== History ==
The Science Center has engaged in formal business incubation since it opened its first shared facility in 2000, followed by the Hubert J.P. Schoemaker Center for Technology Advancement in 2006 and 3711 in 2009. in 2016 the Science Center announced a strategic partnership with Cambridge Innovation Center (CIC) who took over management of shared office and lab space at uCity Square.

Launched in 2011, Quorum is a convening space for entrepreneurs and innovators throughout the region to convene, interact, network and exchange ideas. The modular space facilitates their ability to build knowledge and explore opportunities. In September 2018, Quorum moved from 3711 Market Street to 3675 Market Street where it tripled in size, totaling 11,000 square feet of meeting and event space.

According to University City Science Center: An Engine of Economic Growth for Greater Philadelphia, which was prepared by the Economy League of Greater Philadelphia, graduate firms that remain in the Philadelphia area produce $4.2 million in state income taxes and $22 million in Philadelphia city wage taxes every year.

On May 28, 2010, the Science Center filed a lawsuit to stop the Philadelphia Development Authority from seizing two parcels of land in the 3800 block of Market Street when the Authority contended that the Science Center was in default of its development agreement in September, 2009. The Science Center argued in its lawsuit that current economic conditions had delayed redevelopment, constituting an unforeseeable cause of the apparent default, and therefore should not be grounds for taking back the land. The dispute was ended in April 2012, when the two organizations amended the redevelopment agreement to allow more time for the Science Center to complete the development of its campus.

In August 2012, the Science Center announced it was to begin development of its next parcel, a 272,700-square-foot building at the northeast corner of 38th and Market streets, to house outpatient medical facilities, ground-floor retail, and office and lab space for startup and growing companies.

In 2019, the Science Center launched the annual Nucleus Awards to honor leaders fostering a more innovative and collaborative future. Big names in the local STEM ecosystem have since received the award, including Bon Ku and Danae Mobley, with WHYY’s “The Pulse” host Maiken Scott serving as MC.

In 2022, the Science Center sold 3440 Market St. for $45 million in order to use funds raised from the real estate deal to invest back into its programs.

=== Ownership ===
The center is a nonprofit 501(c)(3) organization with 31 regional shareholders:

- The American College
- Bryn Mawr College
- Burlington County College
- The Children’s Hospital of Philadelphia
- Delaware State University
- Drexel University
- East Stroudsburg University
- Haverford College
- Lafayette College
- Lehigh University
- Lincoln University
- Mercy Health System
- NUS America (National University of Singapore)
- The Penjerdel Council
- Pennsylvania Hospital
- Philadelphia College of Osteopathic Medicine
- Philadelphia University
- The Presbyterian Foundation for Philadelphia
- Rowan University
- Rutgers, The State University of New Jersey
- Salus University
- Swarthmore College
- Temple University
- Temple University School of Podiatric Medicine
- Thomas Jefferson University
- University of the Arts
- University of the Sciences
- University of Delaware
- University of Pennsylvania
- Villanova University
- Widener University
