= West Philadelphia Streetcar Suburb Historic District =

Historic district in Pennsylvania, United States

- U.S. National Register of Historic Places
- U.S. Historic district
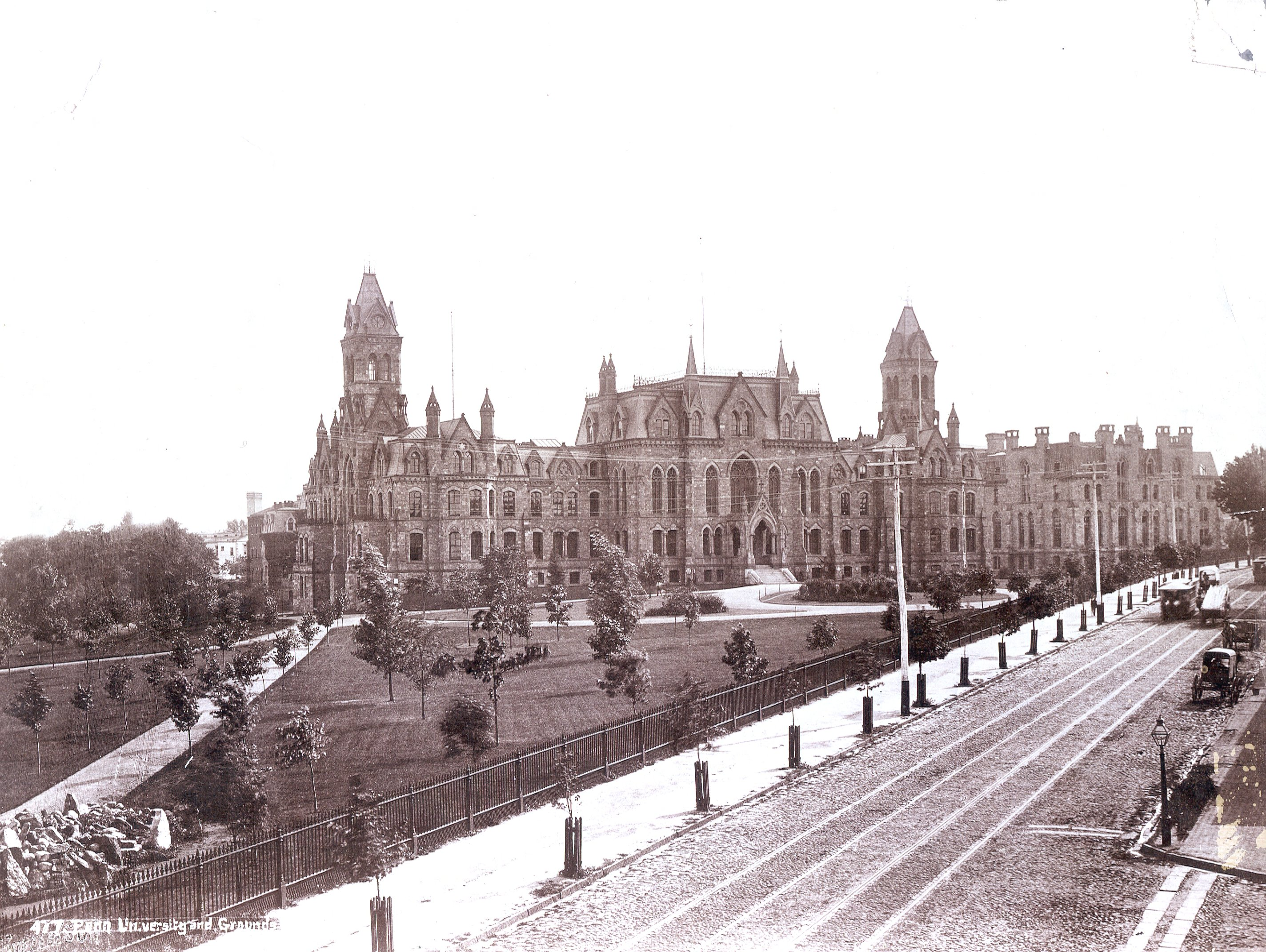
- College Hall (and Logan Hall) viewed from Woodland Ave., ca. 1892.

- Location within Philadelphia Location within Pennsylvania Location within the United States
- Location: Roughly bounded by University of Pennsylvania campus, Woodlands Cemetery, Poweltown Avenue, 52nd Street, and Woodland Avenue; Philadelphia, Pennsylvania
- Coordinates: 39°57′1″N 75°12′45″W
- Area: 640 acres (260 ha)
- Architect: multiple
- Architectural style: Queen Anne, Colonial Revival, Classical Revival
- NRHP reference No.: 97001669 (original); 100002341 (increase)

Significant dates
- Added to NRHP: February 5, 1998
- Boundary increase: April 17, 2018

The West Philadelphia Streetcar Suburb Historic District is an area of West Philadelphia listed on the National Register of Historic Places. It represented the transformation of Philadelphia's rural farmland into urban residential development, made possible by the streetcar, which provided easy access to Center City. This is an early example of the streetcar suburb.

Development had proceeded during the 19th century to about 43rd Street. The arrival of electrified streetcars in 1892 accelerated development to the west and southwest.

Noted Philadelphia church architect Isaac Pursell (1853-1910) designed the contributing Christ Memorial Church (1887) at 4233-4257 Chestnut Street.

== See also ==
- Clark Park
- The Woodlands Cemetery
- Hamilton Village
- Woodland Terrace
