= Woodland Terrace, Philadelphia =

- Woodland Terrace
- U.S. National Register of Historic Places
- U.S. Historic district
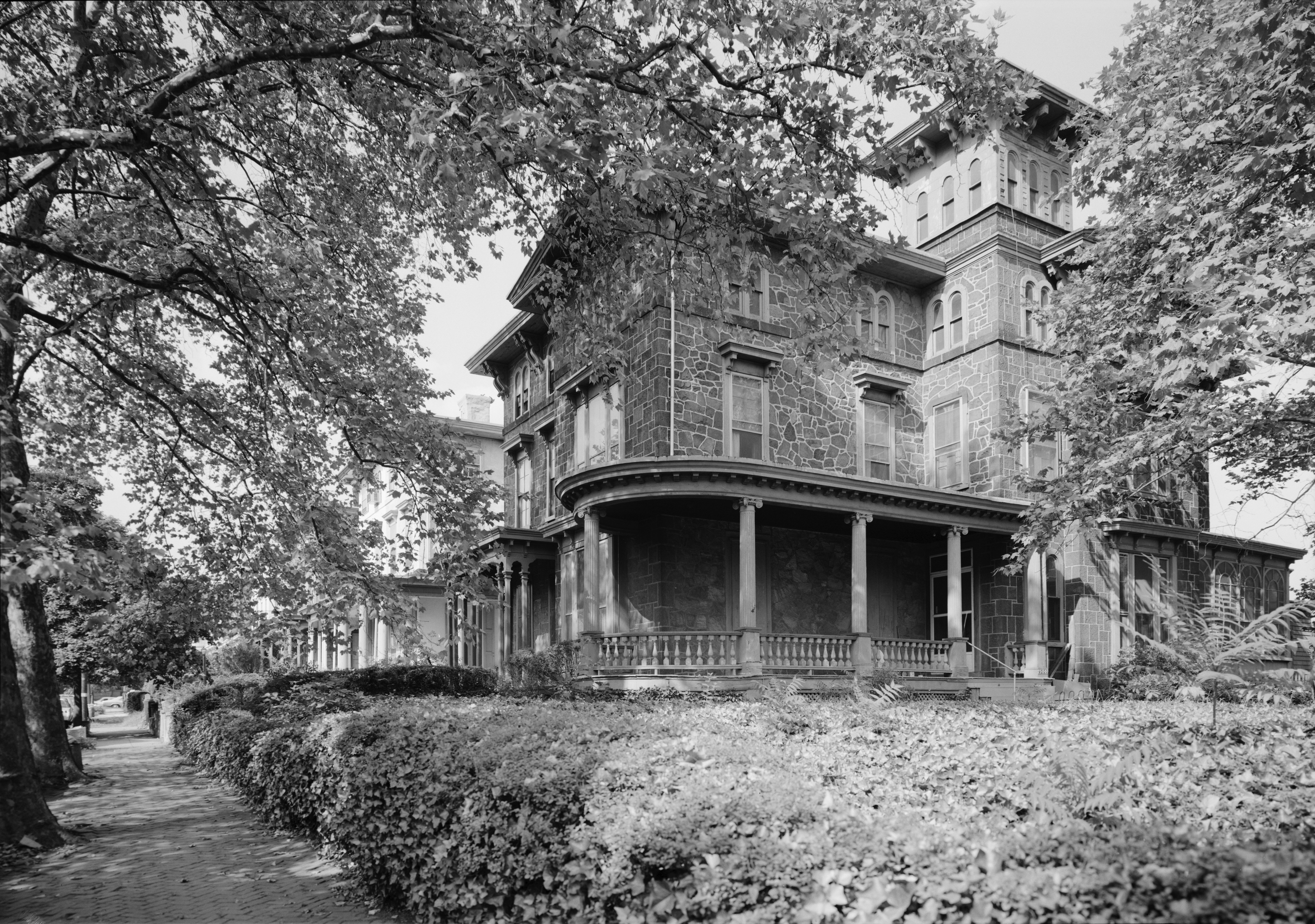

- Location within Philadelphia Location within Pennsylvania Location within the United States
- Location: 501–519, 500–520 Woodland Ter. Philadelphia, Pennsylvania
- Coordinates: 39°56′56″N 75°12′19″W
- Area: 5.4 acres (2.2 ha)
- Built: 1861
- Architect: Sloan, Samuel
- Architectural style: Italianate
- NRHP reference No.: 72001176
- Added to NRHP: March 16, 1972

Woodland Terrace is a street name and a small neighborhood of twin mansions in the West Philadelphia section of Philadelphia, Pennsylvania, United States. It was listed as a historic district on the National Register of Historic Places on March 16, 1972. The street runs from Baltimore Avenue to Woodland Avenue between 40th and 41st streets.

Architect Samuel Sloan designed the houses along the street and in several other nearby areas. Woodland Terrace was built in 1861 by Charles M. S. Leslie. Twentieth-century architect Paul Cret lived at 516 Woodland Terrace for much of his career in Philadelphia.

== See also ==
- The Woodlands Cemetery
- West Philadelphia Streetcar Suburb Historic District
