= National Register of Historic Places listings in West Philadelphia =

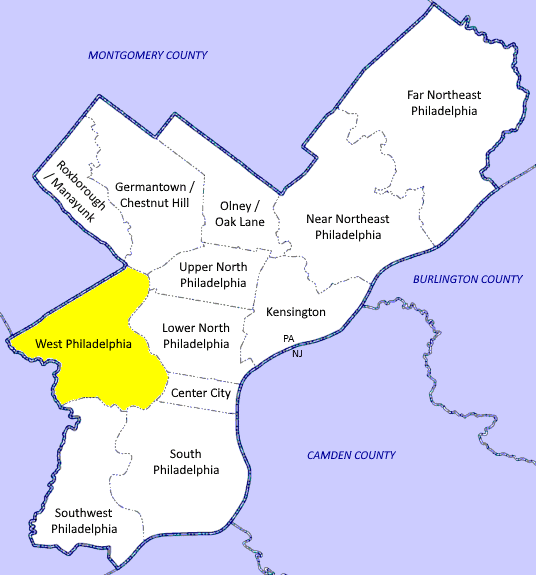
Location of West Philadelphia in Philadelphia

This is a list of the National Register of Historic Places listings in West Philadelphia.

This is intended to be a complete list of the properties and districts on the National Register of Historic Places in West Philadelphia, Pennsylvania, United States. The locations of National Register properties and districts for which the latitude and longitude coordinates are included below, may be seen in an online map.

There are 589 properties and districts listed on the National Register in Philadelphia, including 67 National Historic Landmarks. West Philadelphia includes 68 of these properties and districts, including five National Historic Landmarks; the city's remaining properties and districts are listed elsewhere. Two sites are split between West Philadelphia and other parts of the city, and are thus included on multiple lists.

== Current listings ==
	Name on the Register	Image	Date listed	Location	Neighborhood	Description
1	32nd St. and Lancaster Ave. Philadelphia Armory	32nd St. and Lancaster Ave. Philadelphia Armory	November 14, 1991 (#91001703)	Junction of 32nd Street and Lancaster Avenue; 39°57′23″N 75°11′19″W	University City	
2	Dimner Beeber Junior High School	Dimner Beeber Junior High School	November 18, 1988 (#88002244)	5901 Malvern Avenue; 39°59′11″N 75°14′34″W	West Parkside	
3	Bell Telephone Exchange Building	Bell Telephone Exchange Building	March 20, 2002 (#02000227)	10 North Preston Street; 39°57′28″N 75°12′15″W	Powelton Village	Telephone switching station from about 1900 to 1928
4	Belmont Avenue Bridge in Philadelphia	Belmont Avenue Bridge in Philadelphia	June 22, 1988 (#88000843)	Belmont Avenue over Ramp B 39°59′37″N 75°13′04″W	Fairmount Park	
5	Belmont School	Belmont School	November 18, 1988 (#88002245)	4030–4060 Brown Street; 39°58′00″N 75°12′18″W	Belmont	
6	Rudolph Blankenburg School	Rudolph Blankenburg School	November 18, 1988 (#88002248)	4600 Girard Avenue; 39°58′21″N 75°12′55″W	Mill Creek	
7	Breslyn Apartments	Breslyn Apartments	November 14, 1982 (#82001544)	4624–4642 Walnut Street & the 200 block of South 47th Street; 39°57′20″N 75°12′55″W	Spruce Hill	
8	George L. Brooks School	George L. Brooks School	December 4, 1986 (#86003266)	5629–5643 Haverford Avenue; 39°58′06″N 75°14′00″W	Haddington	
9	Lewis C. Cassidy School	Lewis C. Cassidy School	November 18, 1988 (#88002252)	6533 Lansdowne Avenue; 39°58′30″N 75°15′03″W	Morris Park	
10	Centennial National Bank	Centennial National Bank	March 11, 1971 (#71000721)	32nd and Market Streets; 39°57′18″N 75°11′13″W	University City	Frank Furness, architect (1875–76).
11	Chamounix	Chamounix	April 26, 1972 (#72001146)	West Fairmount Park on Chamounix Drive; 40°00′13″N 75°11′47″W	Fairmount Park	
12	City Line Avenue Bridge	City Line Avenue Bridge	June 22, 1988 (#88000802)	City Avenue over eastern branch of Indian Creek; 39°58′29″N 75°16′50″W	Overbrook Farms	
13	Cobbs Creek Automobile Suburb Historic District	Cobbs Creek Automobile Suburb Historic District	November 12, 1998 (#98001366)	Roughly bounded by Cobbs Creek Parkway, Spruce Street, 62nd Street, and Angora Street. 39°57′01″N 75°14′50″W	Cobbs Creek	
14	College Hall, University of Pennsylvania	College Hall, University of Pennsylvania	February 14, 1978 (#78002444)	Bounded by Walnut, Spruce, 34th, and 36th Streets; 39°57′05″N 75°11′38″W	University City	Thomas W. Richards, architect (1870–72).
15	Drexel Development Historic District	Drexel Development Historic District	November 14, 1982 (#82001546)	Roughly bounded by Pine, Delancey, 39th, and 40th Streets; 39°57′03″N 75°12′09″W	University City	
16	Thomas Dunlap School	Thomas Dunlap School	December 4, 1986 (#86003277)	5031 Race Street; 39°57′47″N 75°13′18″W	Haddington	
17	Fairmount Park	Fairmount Park	February 7, 1972 (#72001151)	Both banks of the Schuylkill River and the Wissahickon Creek, from Spring Garden Street to Northwestern Avenue; 39°59′33″N 75°12′19″W	Fairmount Park	Extends into North and Northwest Philadelphia
18	Furness Library	Furness Library	May 19, 1972 (#72001154)	34th Street below Walnut on the University of Pennsylvania campus 39°57′06″N 75°11′34″W	University City	Frank Furness, architect (1888–91).
19	Garden Court Historic District	Garden Court Historic District	July 5, 1984 (#84003539)	Roughly bounded by Larchwood Avenue, 46th, 50th, and Pine Streets; also 4530 & 4537–4539 Osage Avenue; 39°57′06″N 75°13′07″W	Garden Court	
20	Haddington Historic District	Haddington Historic District	September 29, 1988 (#88001832)	6000 blocks of Market, Ludlow, and Chestnut Streets; 39°57′41″N 75°14′31″W	Haddington	
21	Hanson Haines House	Hanson Haines House	January 29, 1985 (#85000179)	4801 Springfield Avenue; 39°56′46″N 75°13′01″W	Spruce Hill	
22	Hajoca Corporation Headquarters and Showroom	Hajoca Corporation Headquarters and Showroom	February 27, 2003 (#03000079)	3025 Walnut Street; 39°57′08″N 75°11′06″W	University City	
23	Hamilton Family Estate	Hamilton Family Estate	June 22, 1979 (#79002321)	4039–4041 Baltimore Avenue & 4000–4018 Pine Street; 39°57′00″N 75°12′18″W	Spruce Hill	
24	William B. Hanna School	William B. Hanna School	December 4, 1986 (#86003288)	5720–5738 Media Street; 39°58′28″N 75°14′10″W	Carroll Park	
25	Holmes Junior High School	Holmes Junior High School	November 18, 1988 (#88002281)	5429–5455 Chestnut Street; 39°57′35″N 75°13′51″W	Cobbs Creek	
26	Hotel Pennsylvania	Hotel Pennsylvania	December 26, 2012 (#12001097)	3900 Chestnut Street; 39°57′18″N 75°12′00″W	University City	
27	Institute of the Pennsylvania Hospital	Institute of the Pennsylvania Hospital	October 15, 1966 (#66000684)	111 North 49th Street; 39°57′42″N 75°13′02″W	Mill Creek	Samuel Sloan, architect (1856–59).
28	La Blanche Apartments	La Blanche Apartments	March 7, 1985 (#85000470)	5100 Walnut Street; 39°57′23″N 75°13′25″W	Walnut Hill	
29	Henry C. Lea School of Practice	Henry C. Lea School of Practice	November 18, 1988 (#88002291)	242 South 47th Street; 39°57′16″N 75°12′59″W	Walnut Hill	
30	Leader Theater	Leader Theater	August 9, 2021 (#100006793)	4102-4104 Lancaster Avenue; 39°57′54″N 75°12′20″W	Belmont	
31	William Mann School	William Mann School	November 18, 1988 (#88002297)	1835–1869 North 54th Street; 39°59′08″N 75°13′53″W	Wynnefield	
32	Memorial Hall	Memorial Hall	December 8, 1976 (#76001665)	North Concourse Drive; 39°58′46″N 75°12′35″W	Fairmount Park	Herman J. Schwarzmann, architect (1874–76).
33	Monte Vista	Monte Vista	March 3, 1983 (#83002275)	917–931 North 63rd Street, 6154–6160 Oxford Street, and 6151–6157 Nassau Street; 39°58′46″N 75°14′44″W	Overbrook	
34	Overbrook Farms	Overbrook Farms	March 21, 1985 (#85000690)	Roughly bounded by City Line Avenue, 58th Street, Woodbine Avenue, and 64th Street; 39°59′17″N 75°14′55″W	Overbrook Farms	
35	Overbrook High School	Overbrook High School	December 4, 1986 (#86003313)	North 59th Street and Lancaster Avenue; 39°58′52″N 75°14′19″W	Overbrook	
36	Overbrook School	Overbrook School	November 18, 1988 (#88002304)	6201–6231 Lebanon Avenue; 39°58′55″N 75°14′44″W	Overbrook	
37	Overbrook Gardens Apartments	Overbrook Gardens Apartments	April 12, 2021 (#100006369)	902 North 63rd Street; 39°58′43″N 75°14′46″W	Overbrook	
38	Parkside Historic District	Parkside Historic District	November 17, 1983 (#83004248)	Bounded by Penn Central railroad tracks, North 38th Street, Girard, Parkside, and Belmont Avenues. 39°58′24″N 75°12′23″W	Parkside	
39	Penn Wynn House	Penn Wynn House	August 31, 2017 (#100001572)	2201 Bryn Mawr Avenue; 39°59′25″N 75°13′34″W	Wynnefield	
40	Pennsylvania Railroad Freight Building	Pennsylvania Railroad Freight Building	October 28, 1999 (#99001291)	3158 Chestnut Street; 39°57′13″N 75°11′13″W	University City	
41	Pennsylvania Railroad Office Building	Pennsylvania Railroad Office Building	February 27, 2003 (#03000071)	3175 John F. Kennedy Blvd. 39°57′22″N 75°11′15″W	University City	
42	Pinehurst Apartments	Pinehurst Apartments	January 6, 1987 (#86003571)	4517 Pine & 324–334 South 45th Streets; 39°57′07″N 75°12′46″W	Spruce Hill	
43	Poth and Schmidt Development Houses	Poth and Schmidt Development Houses	April 21, 1983 (#83002276)	3306–3316 Arch Street; 39°57′27″N 75°11′24″W	University City	
44	Frederick A. Poth Houses	Frederick A. Poth Houses	April 19, 1979 (#79002327)	North Side of the 3300 block of Powelton Avenue; 39°57′37″N 75°11′25″W	Powelton Village	
45	Powelton Historic District	Powelton Historic District	May 9, 1985 (#85000998)	Roughly bounded by Brandywine Street, 32nd to 39th Streets, and Lancaster Avenue; 39°57′41″N 75°11′32″W	Powelton Village	
46	The Powelton	The Powelton	December 13, 1978 (#78002452)	3510 Powelton Avenue, 216 35th Street, and 215–221 36th Street; 39°57′35″N 75°11′25″W	Powelton Village	
47	Protestant Episcopal Church of the Saviour	Protestant Episcopal Church of the Saviour	August 1, 1979 (#79002328)	Ludlow Street and 3723–3725 Chestnut Street; 39°57′21″N 75°11′52″W	University City	Charles M. Burns, architect (1889, rebuilt after 1902 fire).
48	Provident Mutual Insurance Company	Provident Mutual Insurance Company	December 30, 2019 (#100004809)	4601 Market Street; 39°57′32″N 75°12′51″W	Mill Creek	
49	Richards and Goddard Buildings	Richards and Goddard Buildings	January 16, 2009 (#09000081)	3700–3710 Hamilton Walk; 39°56′59″N 75°11′53″W	University City	On the University of Pennsylvania campus; Louis Kahn, architect (1957–61).
50	Paul Robeson House	Paul Robeson House	November 22, 2000 (#00001345)	4951 Walnut Street; 39°57′29″N 75°13′17″W	Spruce Hill	
51	St. Anthony Hall House	St. Anthony Hall House	February 15, 2005 (#05000064)	3637 Locust Walk, University of Pennsylvania; 39°57′09″N 75°11′47″W	University City	
52	Sansom Row	Sansom Row	December 27, 1977 (#77001190)	3402–3436 Sansom Street; 39°57′13″N 75°11′34″W	University City	
53	John Shedwick Development Houses	John Shedwick Development Houses	March 10, 1982 (#82003814)	3433–3439 Lancaster Avenue; 39°57′28″N 75°11′31″W	Powelton Village	
54	William Shoemaker Junior High School	William Shoemaker Junior High School	December 4, 1986 (#86003328)	1476 North 53rd Street; 39°58′34″N 75°13′42″W	Carroll Park	
55	Mayer Sulzberger Junior High School	Mayer Sulzberger Junior High School	November 18, 1988 (#88002328)	721 North 48th Street; 39°57′53″N 75°12′58″W	Mill Creek	
56	Thirtieth Street Station	Thirtieth Street Station	June 7, 1978 (#78002456)	West River Drive, Market, 30th, and Arch Streets; 39°57′20″N 75°10′55″W	University City	Graham, Anderson, Probst & White, architects (1929–34).
57	United States Post Office-Main Branch	United States Post Office-Main Branch	September 5, 2006 (#06000782)	2970 Market Street; 39°57′14″N 75°10′57″W	University City	
58	University Avenue Bridge	University Avenue Bridge	May 26, 1994 (#94000515)	South University Avenue over the Schuylkill River; 39°56′34″N 75°11′49″W	University City	Extends into South Philadelphia
59	University of Pennsylvania Campus Historic District	University of Pennsylvania Campus Historic District	December 28, 1978 (#78002457)	Roughly bounded by Hamilton Walk, South, 32nd, Walnut, 36th, Spruce, and 39th Streets; 39°57′08″N 75°11′40″W	University City	
60	Walnut Park Plaza Hotel	Walnut Park Plaza Hotel	May 10, 2005 (#05000416)	6232–6250 Walnut Street; 39°57′33″N 75°14′49″W	Cobbs Creek	
61	West Philadelphia High School	West Philadelphia High School	December 4, 1986 (#86003345)	4700 Walnut Street; 39°57′19″N 75°13′01″W	Spruce Hill	
62	West Philadelphia Passenger Railway Company Carhouse	West Philadelphia Passenger Railway Company Carhouse	April 12, 2021 (#100006370)	4100 Haverford Avenue; 39°57′45″N 75°12′21″W	Haverford North	
63	West Philadelphia Streetcar Suburb Historic District	West Philadelphia Streetcar Suburb Historic District	February 5, 1998 (#97001669)	Roughly bounded by the University of Pennsylvania campus, Woodlands Cemetery, Poweltown Avenue, 52nd Street, and Woodland Avenue; 39°57′01″N 75°12′45″W	Spruce Hill	Boundary increase approved April 17, 2018.
64	WFIL Studio	WFIL Studio	July 28, 1986 (#86002092)	4548 Market Street; 39°57′30″N 75°12′45″W	Spruce Hill	
65	Wharton Street Memorial Methodist Episcopal Church and Sunday School	Wharton Street Memorial Methodist Episcopal Church and Sunday School	December 2, 2019 (#100004703)	5337 Catharine Street; 39°56′58″N 75°13′51″W	Cobbs Creek	
66	Woodland Terrace	Woodland Terrace	March 16, 1972 (#72001176)	500 block of Woodland Terrace; 39°56′58″N 75°12′17″W	University City	Samuel Sloan, architect.
67	The Woodlands	The Woodlands	December 24, 1967 (#67000022)	40th Street and Woodland Avenue; 39°56′50″N 75°12′10″W	University City	Built ca. 1742, expanded 1787-90.
68	Wynnestay	Wynnestay	December 30, 2008 (#08001270)	5125 Woodbine Avenue; 39°59′38″N 75°13′49″W	Wynnefield	Built 1689, expanded 1700.

== See also ==
- List of National Historic Landmarks in Philadelphia
- National Register of Historic Places listings in Philadelphia, Pennsylvania
