= Garden Court =

Garden Court may refer to:

- Garden Court, Philadelphia
- Garden Court, a hospitality brand of South African Southern Sun Hotels

== See also ==
- Courtyard
