= Walnut Hill, Philadelphia =

Walnut Hill
- Neighborhood of Philadelphia
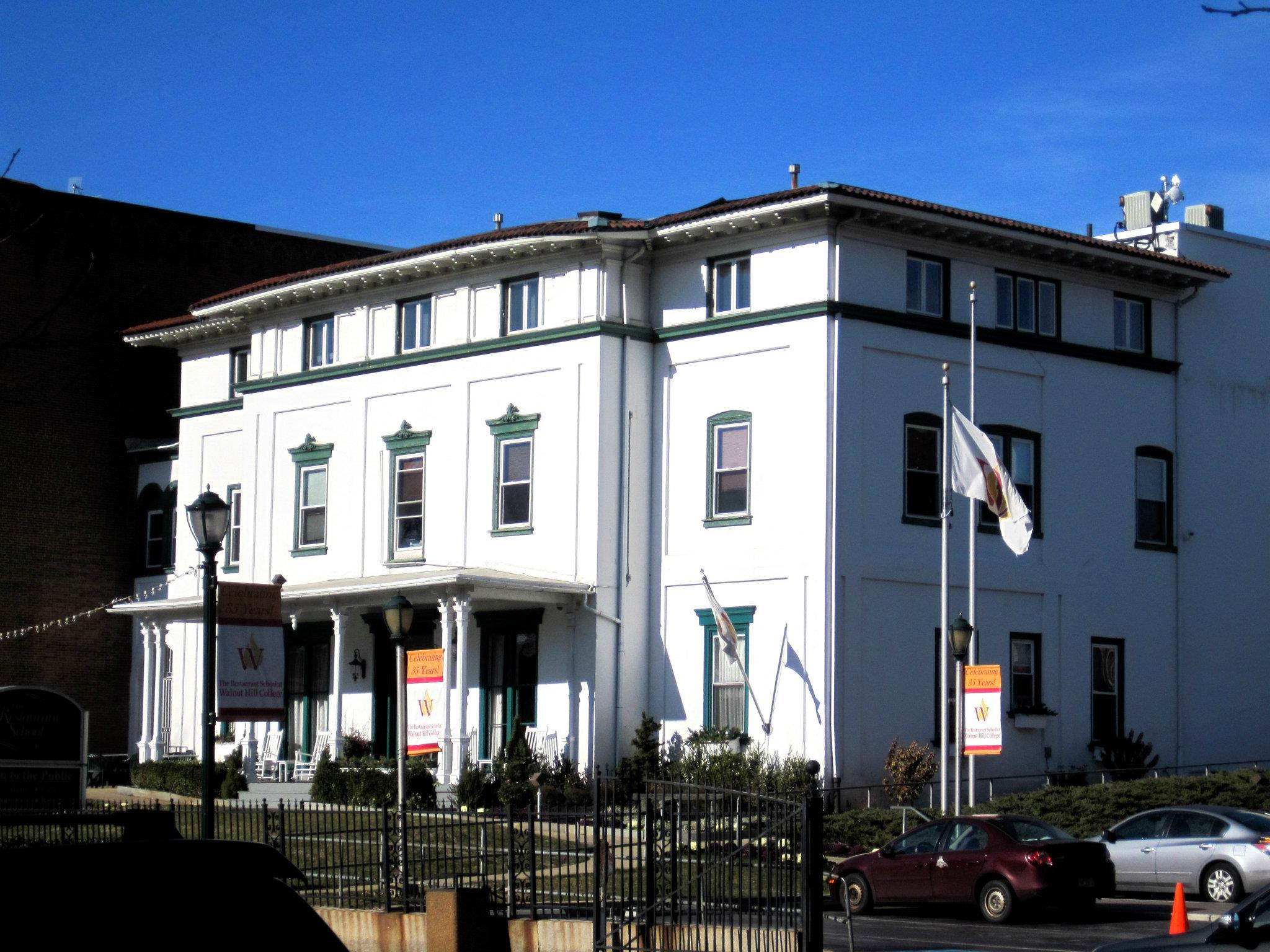
- Allison Mansion on the Walnut Hill College campus

- Location within Philadelphia
- Country: United States
- State: Pennsylvania
- County: Philadelphia
- City: Philadelphia
- Area codes: 215, 267, and 445

Walnut Hill is a neighborhood in the West Philadelphia section of Philadelphia, Pennsylvania, United States. It is located between 45th Street and 52nd Street, bounded by Market Street and Spruce Street. Most of the neighborhood is in the northwestern part of the University City District. It is located north of the neighborhoods of Garden Court and Spruce Hill.

Walnut Hill is a racially mixed neighborhood with a large seasonal student population. Walnut Hill was largely built from the start of the 20th century through the 1940s, with a large growth spurt immediately following the construction of what is now the SEPTA Market-Frankford Line. The primarily residential neighborhood consists of two and three-story row homes, with several pre-war garden style apartments.

West Philadelphia High School is located in Walnut Hill and The Restaurant School at Walnut Hill College is close by, if not technically within the boundaries of the neighborhood. In recent years, the Enterprise Center Community Development Corporation, in collaboration with the Walnut Hill Community Association, has made strides to spur development in the neighborhood.

The La Blanche Apartments and Henry C. Lea School of Practice are listed on the National Register of Historic Places.

American Bandstand was first broadcast from the ABC studio at 46th and Market Streets (now the Enterprise Center).

Science fiction author Isaac Asimov lived at Wyngate Hall (now called The Terrace), a garden apartment building at 50th and Spruce, from 1942 to 1945, and wrote several of the stories that comprise I, Robot and the Foundation series while living there.

Singer, actor and activist Paul Robeson lived with his sister at 50th and Walnut from 1968 until his death in 1976. A mural at 45th and Chestnut commemorates Robeson.

From the 1930s through the 1970s, the Philadelphia College of Osteopathic Medicine (PCOM) was located at 48th and Spruce, their former building now houses the Emmanual Church, a Korean language Presbyterian congregation.
