= Wharton Street Memorial Methodist Episcopal Church =

Episcopalian church in Philadelphia

- U.S. National Register of Historic Places
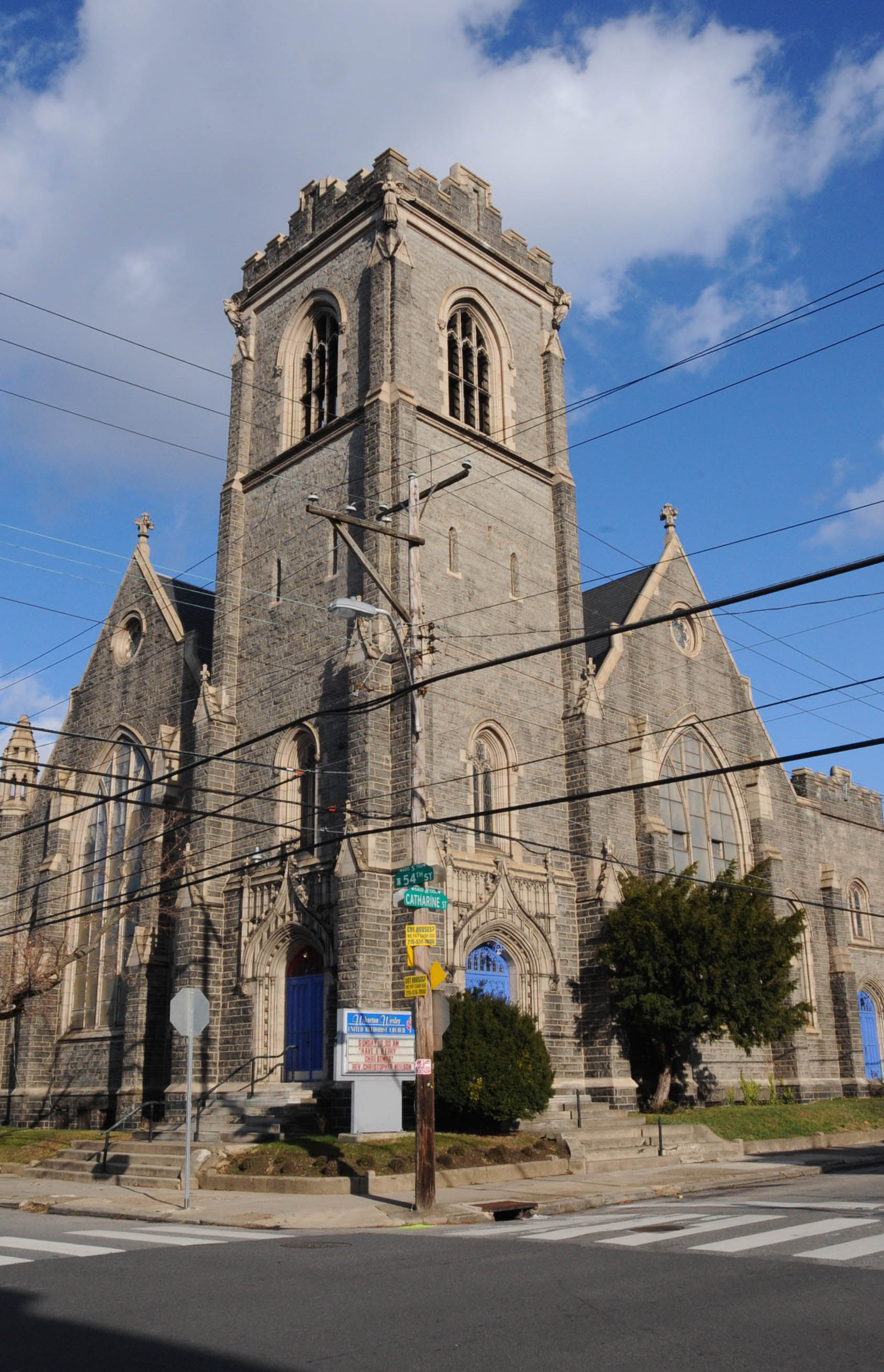
- Location: 5337–5341 Catharine Street, Philadelphia
- Coordinates: 39°56′58″N 75°13′51″W
- Built: 1905
- Architect: Wesley Lesther Blithe
- Architectural style: Collegiate Gothic
- Website: www.wharton-wesleyumc.org
- NRHP reference No.: 100004703
- Added to NRHP: December 2, 2019

The Wharton Street Memorial Methodist Episcopal Church is an Methodist Episcopal Church and former historical congregation now located in West Philadelphia. Its most recent place of worship was added to the National Register of Historic Places on December 2, 2019. At its peak, it had a congregation of 1,500, but now hosts around 150.

== Old city location ==
The original Wharton Street church was located between 3rd and 4th on Wharton in 1842, in the location that now houses the St. Casimir Lithuanian Catholic Church. Its founding was the merging of Ebenezer ME and a subsidiary, Bethesda ME. The original building was damaged during an April 1844 storm. In late 1870 and early 1871, it was beautified by the congregation's leadership to be transformed from an unassuming brick building to a more elaborate edifice. On the congregation's 50th anniversary celebration on October 17, 1892, a speech was supposed to be given by Elijah Walker Halford, the private secretary to then-President Benjamin Harrison. Such a speech was cancelled at the last minute due to the illness of Harrison's wife, Caroline Harrison, who would die 8 days later from complications of Tuberculosis.

== Post-move ==
The location of worship moved to its modern West Philadelphia location in the early 20th century with the advent of the streetcar. The church's modern location was selected at 54th and Catharine Streets, and was initially to be a one-story frame chapel built by Henry C. Dahl for a cost of $2,400. Such a purchase was done in late 1904. By early 1905, a larger tract of land was sold adjacent by John Megraw to the church for $9,000. Its full modern incarnation with the larger edifice on that wider tract was designed and built in 1905 by Wesley Lesher Blithe (1873–1946). It was built by James Johnson and constructed from Port Deposit granite in the Collegiate Gothic style. The estimated cost for the construction at the time was $100,000 ($3,269000 in 2026). At the time, a contemporary justification for by the Philadelphia Inquirer stated "For more than half a century [it] was the leading downtown Methodist congregation, but through the invasion of that section by many foreigners, the American-born population were forced to move away."

The new location's founding secretary was William H. Hickman. In the year 1907, it had a membership of around 400 congregants. In 1915, a Sunday school was added to the building, built at a cost of $30,000 ($980,831 in 2026). The congregation celebrated the burning of their mortgage for the building in 1920. At that time, it had a congregation of 1,500.

In 1926, the church was nearly destroyed during a severe lightning storm. However, its metal flagpole acted as a lightning rod, and was broken during the process of absorbing the strikes.

By at least 1973, the congregation was merged with John Wesley and was renamed the Wharton Wesley United Methodist Church It was nominated by the Philadelphia Historical Commission for NRHP status on May 10, 2019, and became such on December 2, 2019.

== Pastors ==
=== Location at 4th and Wharton ===
- Rev John A. Boyle fl. 1841
- Rev. W.H. Elliott fl. 1840s
- Dr. Rev. Franklin Moore ?–?
- Rev. G.D. Carrow fl. 1861
- Rev Dr. John F. Chaplain fl. 1864
- Rev. J.B. Maddux fl. 1869
- Rev. Joseph Mason fl. 1871
- Rev. Burton J. Kollock fl. 1873
- Rev. William Swindells fl. 1876–1878
- Rev. Theo Stevens fl. 1879
- Rev. Thomas Harrison fl. 1879
- Rev. Dr. W.J. Paxson fl. 1885–1886
- Rev. Charles W. Bickley fl. 1887–1890
- Rev. C. Wesley Stretch fl. 1891
- Rev. S.N. Vernon fl. 1891–1893
- Rev. E.C. Griffiths fl. 1894–1896
- Rev. W.T. Chase fl. 1897
- Rev. Charles M. Simpson fl. 1897–1902
- Rev. Jay Dickerson fl. 1902–1911

=== Location at 54th and Catharine ===
- Rev. Eugene W. Stillman fl. 1912–1916†
- Rev. Samuel McAdams fl. 1916
- Rev. Dr. William E.P. Haas fl. 1917–1924
- Rev. Dr. John G. Wilson fl. 1925–1933
- Rev. Dr. Richard Radcliffe fl. 1934–1936
- Rev. Albert Metzger Witmer fl. 1938
- Rev. Roderick D. Clark fl. 1983–1994†
- Rev. Celess Martin fl. 1989
- David Brown fl. 2018
- Kia Lockman fl. 2026
