= Hamilton Family Estate =

Historic house in Pennsylvania, United States

- U.S. National Register of Historic Places
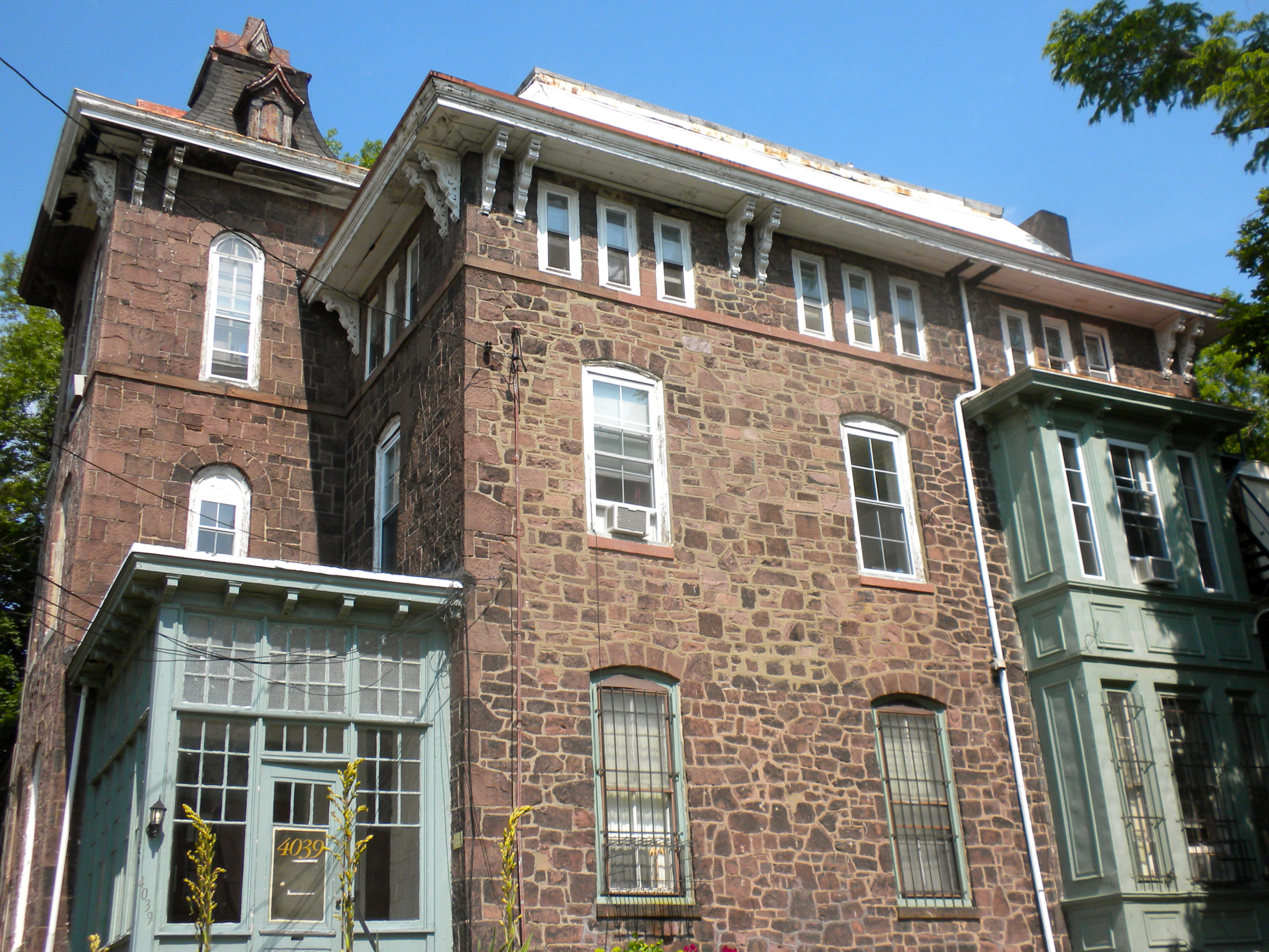
- 4039 Baltimore Ave., May 2010

- Location within Philadelphia Location within Pennsylvania Location within the United States
- Location: 400 S. 40th St., 403-405 S. 41st St., 4039-4041 Baltimore Ave., and 4000-4018 Pine St., Philadelphia, Pennsylvania
- Coordinates: 39°57′00″N 75°12′18″W
- Area: 3 acres (1.2 ha)
- Built: 1853-1863
- Architect: Sloan, Samuel; et al.
- Architectural style: Italianate
- NRHP reference No.: 79002321
- Added to NRHP: June 22, 1979

The Hamilton Family Estate is a set of nine historic homes which are located in the Spruce Hill, Philadelphia, Pennsylvania.

This group of structures was added to the National Register of Historic Places in 1979.

== History and architectural features ==
Built roughly between 1853 and 1863, these historic structures are representative examples of the Italianate-style of architecture. They were primarily built of stucco and masonry, with porches and bracketed cornices. The houses at 400 S. 40th Street and 4000 and 4002 Pine Street are believed to have been designed by architect Samuel Sloan.

== See also ==
- Hamilton family
