= West Philadelphia Passenger Railway Company Carhouse =

Building in Philadelphia

- U.S. National Register of Historic Places
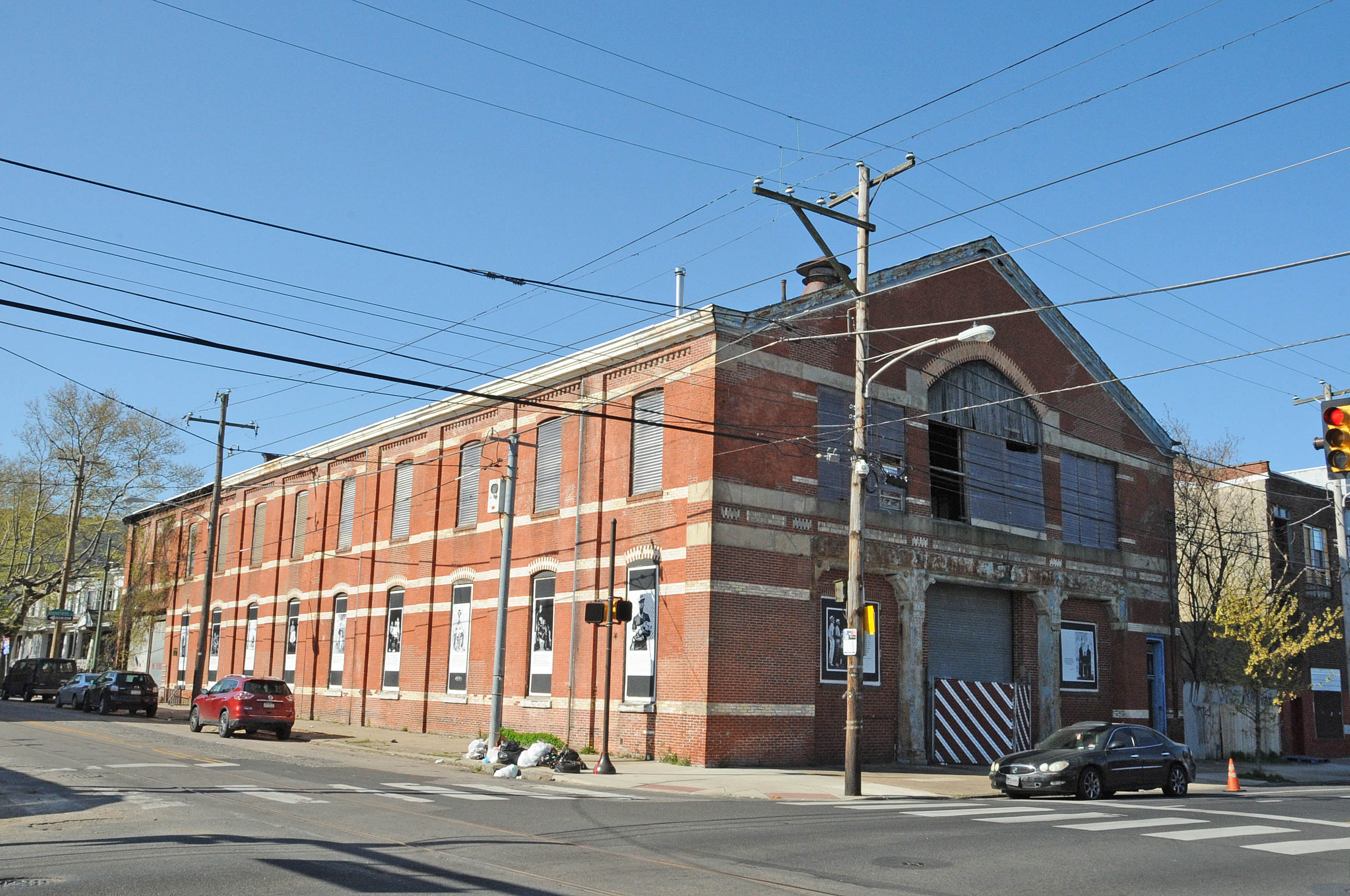
- Structure in 2021, prior to restoration
- Location: 4100 Haverford Avenue, Philadelphia, Pennsylvania
- Coordinates: 39°57′45″N 75°12′21″W
- Built: 1876; 2022 (renovation)
- Architectural style: Late Victorian
- Website: www.pscophilly.com/philadelphia/4100-haverford-carriage-car-lofts
- NRHP reference No.: 100006370
- Added to NRHP: April 12, 2021

The West Philadelphia Passenger Railway Company Carhouse (WPPRCC) was a building owned by the West Philadelphia Passenger Railway. It was added to the National Register of Historic Places on April 12, 2021.

== History ==
The building, built in the Late Victorian style, opened in 1876, and was a train shed for off-duty passenger cars. It was part of an effort by the city of Philadelphia to expand commuter access ahead of the Centennial Exposition in Fairmount Park. At the time of its active use, it was the ending passenger depot for the Market Street Line. In 1922, it ended its use as a carhouse.

By 1955, it was used by Penn Instruments as an industrial building.

It was raided by police in connection with producing puppets for parties involved with the 1999 Seattle WTO protests and 2000 RNC protests.

It began a tax credit renovation starting in 2022, and in 2025, it reopened as "Carriage Car Lofts", an apartment complex providing 30 units.
