= Pinehurst Apartments =

- U.S. National Register of Historic Places
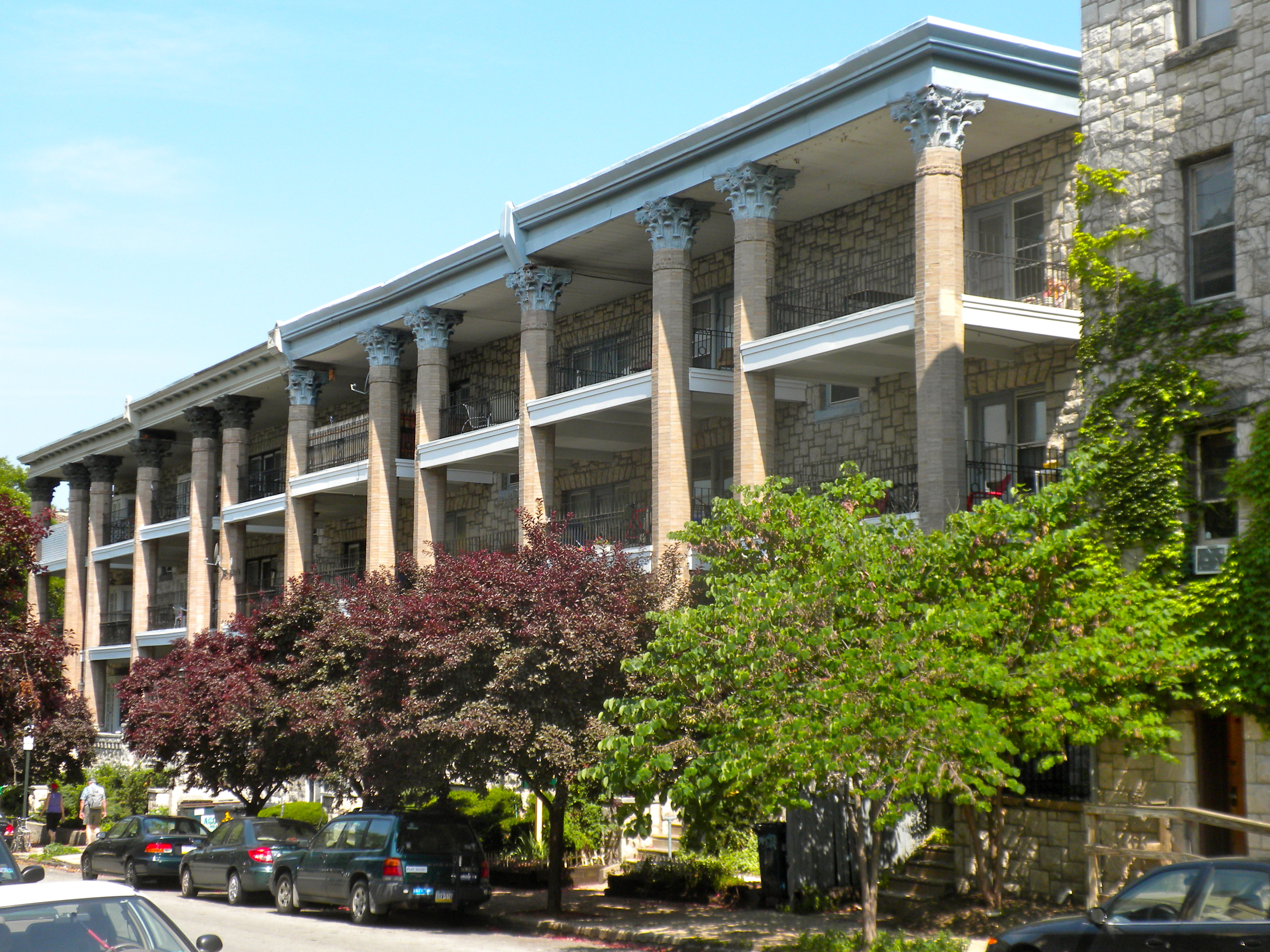
- Pinehurst Apartments, May 2010

- Location within Philadelphia Location within Pennsylvania Location within the United States
- Location: 4511-4523 Pine and 324-334 S. Forty-fifth Sts., Philadelphia, Pennsylvania
- Coordinates: 39°57′7″N 75°12′47″W
- Area: 0.7 acres (0.28 ha)
- Built: 1914
- Architect: Seeds, Edwin L.
- NRHP reference No.: 86003571
- Added to NRHP: January 6, 1987

Pinehurst Apartments, also known as Pine Street Place and Pine Terrace, is a historic apartment complex located in the Spruce Hill neighborhood of Philadelphia, Pennsylvania. It was built in 1914, and consists of two 3 1/2-story, reinforced concrete buildings faced in brick and granite. The buildings feature colonnaded porches with Corinthian order columns.

It was added to the National Register of Historic Places in 1987.
