= Breslyn Apartments =

- U.S. National Register of Historic Places
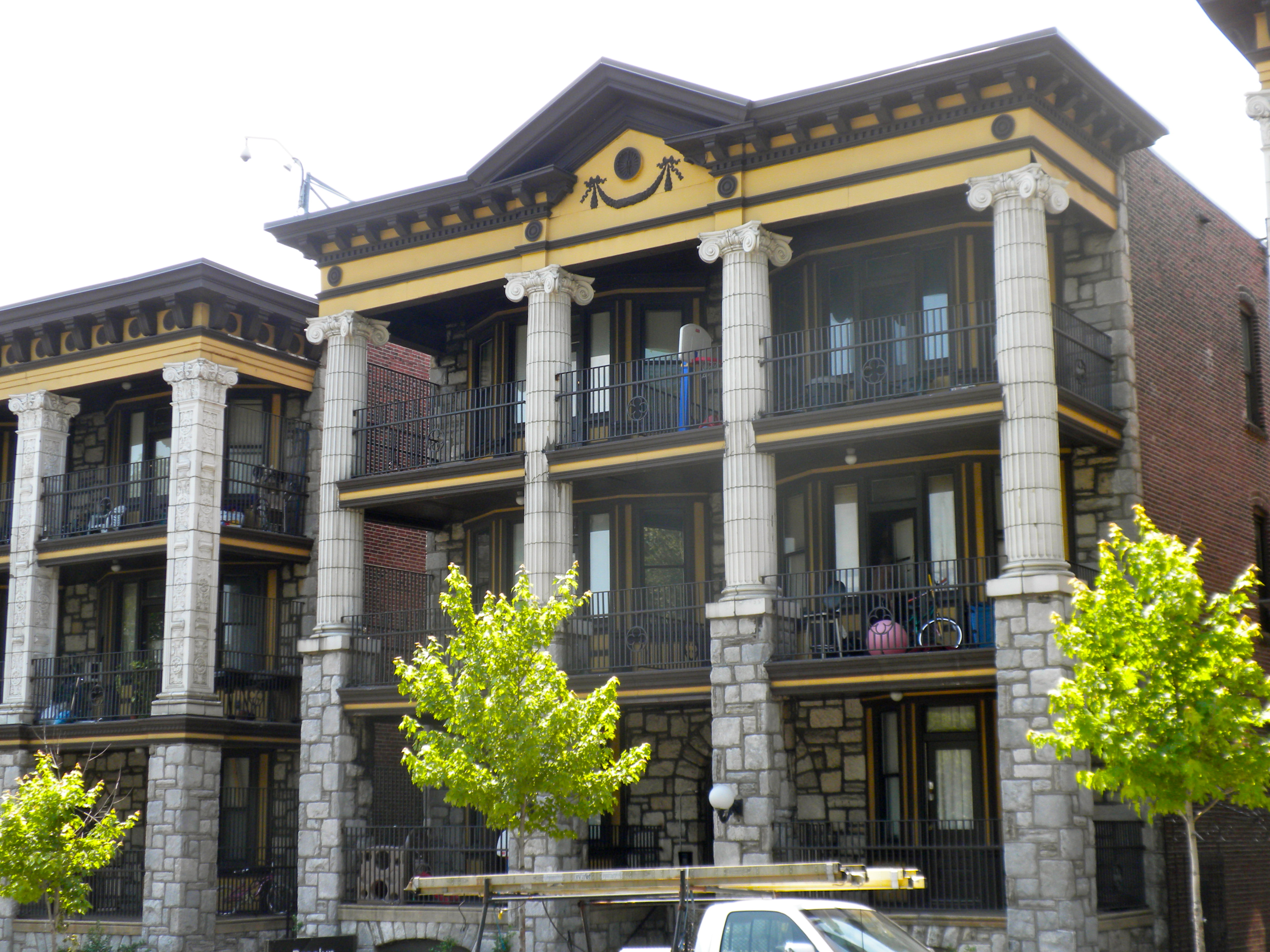
- Breslyn Apartments, May 2010

- Location within Philadelphia Location within Pennsylvania Location within the United States
- Location: 4624-4642 Walnut St., 201-213 S. 47th St., Philadelphia, Pennsylvania
- Coordinates: 39°57′19″N 75°12′55″W
- Area: less than one acre
- Built: 1913
- Architect: Michaelsen, Frederick, C.
- Architectural style: Beaux Arts
- NRHP reference No.: 82001544
- Added to NRHP: November 14, 1982

The Breslyn Apartments is an historic apartment complex which is located in the Spruce Hill neighborhood of Philadelphia, Pennsylvania.

It was added to the National Register of Historic Places in 1982.

== History and architectural features ==
Built in 1913, this complex consists of five three-story, brick and granite buildings with terra cotta and galvanized-iron trim, which were designed in the Beaux Arts-style. Each building measures thirty-eight feet wide and ninety-eight feet deep. The buildings features large open porch-balconies with Ionic order columns, segmental-arch windows, bow and bay windows, and terra cotta piers with Corinthian order caps.
