= Hanson Haines House =

Historic house in Pennsylvania, United States

- U.S. National Register of Historic Places
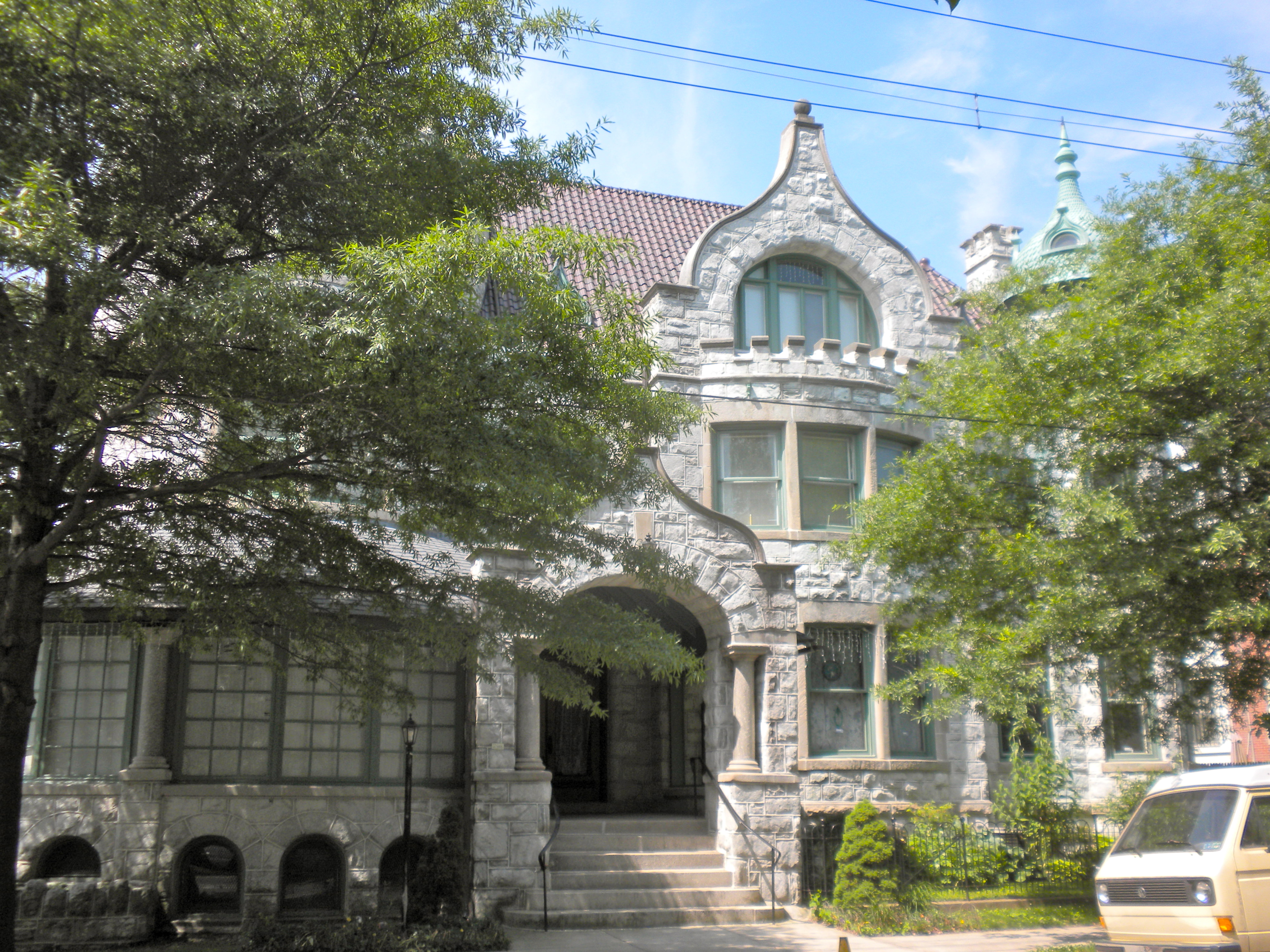
- 48th Street facade

- Location within Philadelphia Location within Pennsylvania Location within the United States
- Location: 4801 Springfield Ave., Philadelphia, Pennsylvania
- Coordinates: 39°56′46″N 75°13′1″W
- Area: 0.1 acres (0.040 ha)
- Built: 1903
- Architects: Balderston, Charles
- Architectural style: German Medieval Revival
- NRHP reference No.: 85000179
- Added to NRHP: January 29, 1985

The Hanson Haines House, sometimes known simply as the Castle, is a residence at 4801 Springfield Avenue in the Spruce Hill neighborhood of West Philadelphia. The house was built in 1902-03 for Quaker banker Hanson Haines by Quaker architect Charles Balderston in a German Medieval Revival style on the exterior and in a Colonial Revival style in the interior.

It was added to the National Register of Historic Places in 1985.

== Gallery ==
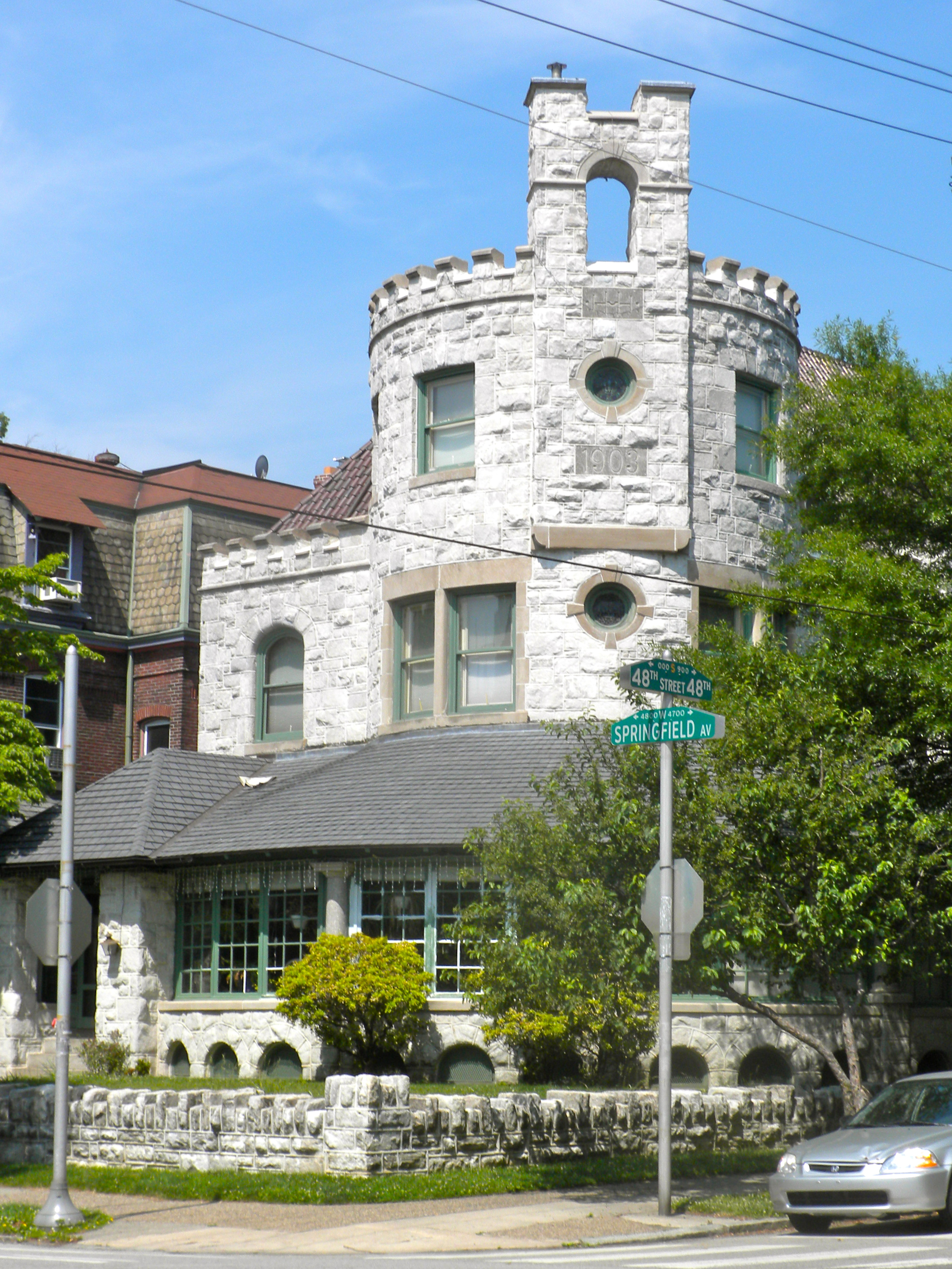
Tower

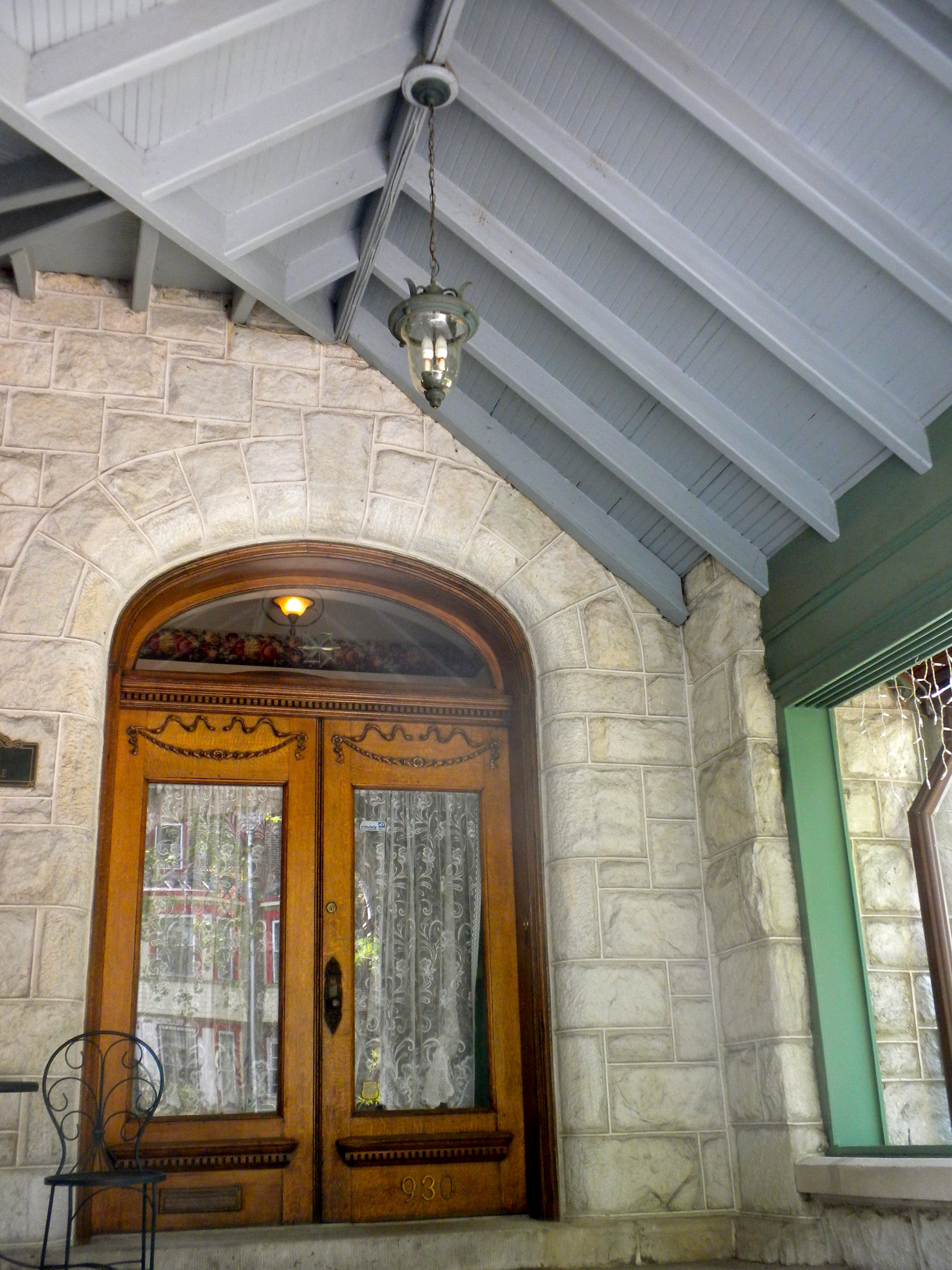
Entrance on 48th Street

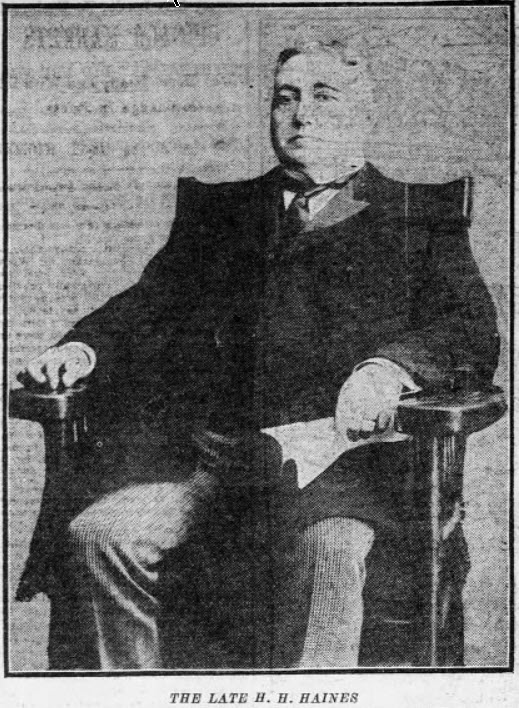
