= Rudolph Blankenburg School =

- U.S. National Register of Historic Places
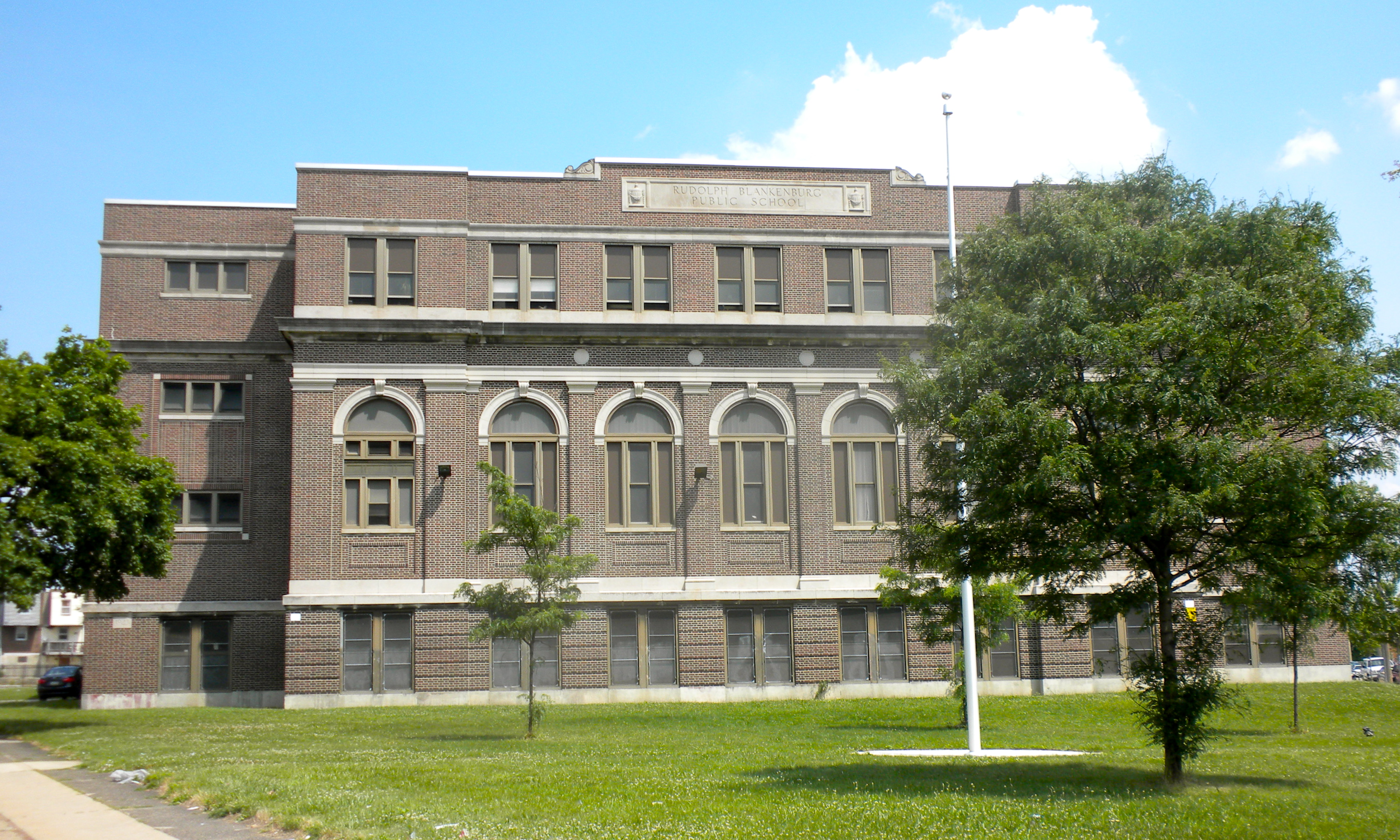
- Rudolph Blankenburg School, June 2010

- Location within Philadelphia Location within Pennsylvania Location within the United States
- Location: 4600 W. Girard Ave., Philadelphia, Pennsylvania
- Coordinates: 39.9727°N 75.2152°W
- Area: 3 acres (1.2 ha)
- Built: 1923–1925
- Architect: Irwin T. Catharine
- Architectural style: Colonial Revival
- MPS: Philadelphia Public Schools TR
- NRHP reference No.: 88002248
- Added to NRHP: November 18, 1988

The Rudolph Blankenburg School is a historic American school in the Mill Creek neighborhood of Philadelphia, Pennsylvania. It is part of the School District of Philadelphia, and was named in honor of Rudolph Blankenburg, who was mayor of Philadelphia between 1911 and 1915.

The building was added to the National Register of Historic Places in 1988.

== History and architectural features ==
This building was designed by Irwin T. Catharine and built between 1923 and 1925. It is a three-story, nine-bay by five-bay, brick building that sits on a raised basement. Created in the Colonial Revival style, it features large stone arch surrounds on the first level, a projecting entrance pavilion, a double stone cornice, and brick parapet topped by stone coping.
