= Sansom Row =

Historic house in Pennsylvania, United States

- U.S. National Register of Historic Places
- U.S. Historic district
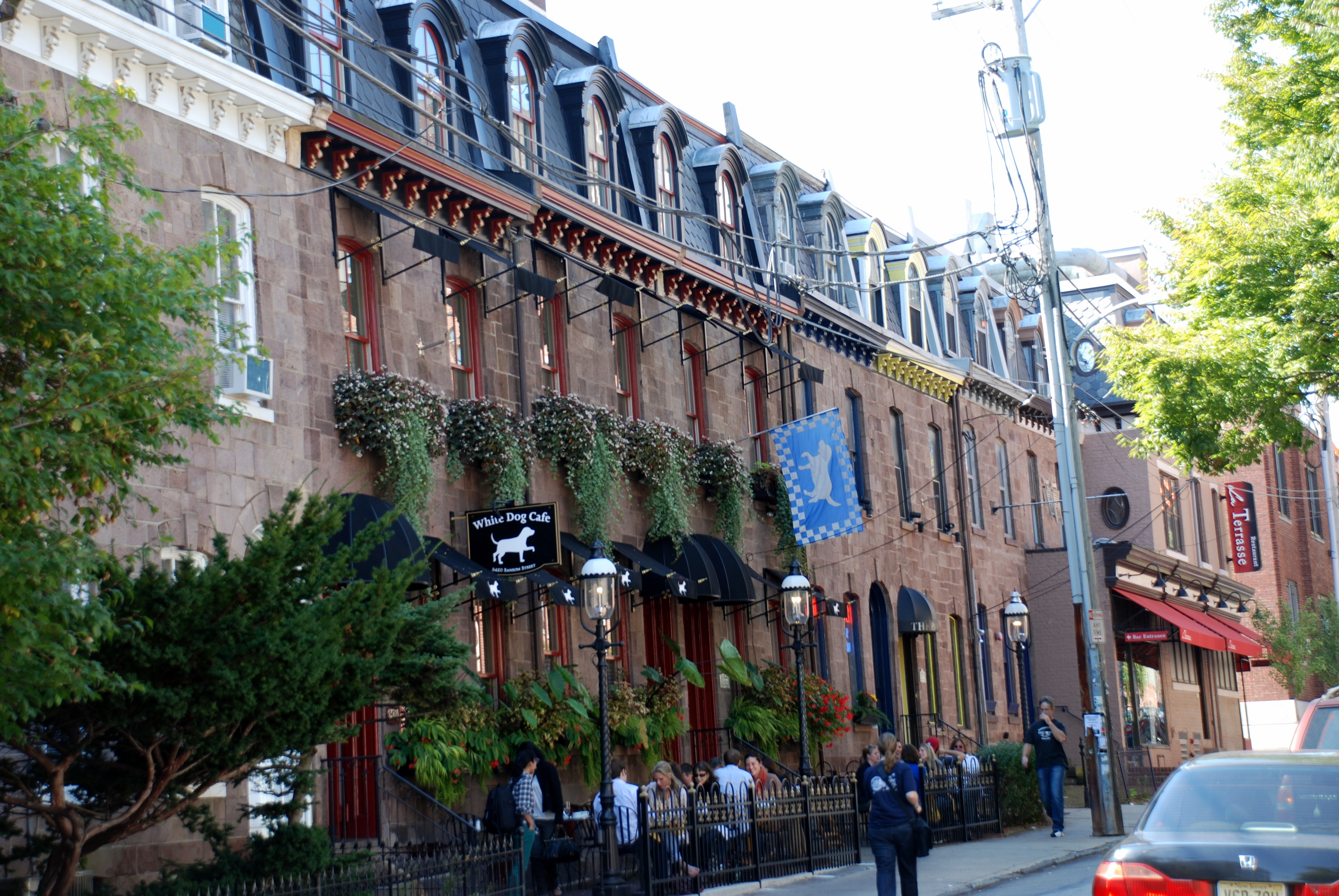

- Location within Philadelphia Location within Pennsylvania Location within the United States
- Location: 3402–3436 Sansom St., Philadelphia, Pennsylvania
- Coordinates: 39°57′12″N 75°11′35″W
- Area: 0.4 acres (0.16 ha)
- Built: 1869
- Architect: John Cochran
- Architectural style: Second Empire
- NRHP reference No.: 77001190
- Added to NRHP: December 27, 1977

Sansom Row is a row of historic houses located at 3402 to 3436 Sansom Street in the University City neighborhood of Philadelphia, Pennsylvania.

== History and architectural features ==
Built from 1869 to 1871, the rowhouses were constructed in matching three-story pairs, with brownstone facades and slate mansard roofs. They are significant as a surviving example of post-Civil War architecture in the area.

Madame Blavatsky, a founder of Theosophy and the Theosophical Society, lived for a time in the rowhouse located at 3420 Sansom Street.

The houses were built as residences but most have been converted to other, mainly commercial uses. In the 1970s it became a popular locale among the University of Pennsylvania community and local residents for its restaurants and shops, like La Terrasse, White Dog Cafe and The Black Cat .
