= Poth and Schmidt Development Houses =

Set of six double houses in Philadelphia

- U.S. National Register of Historic Places
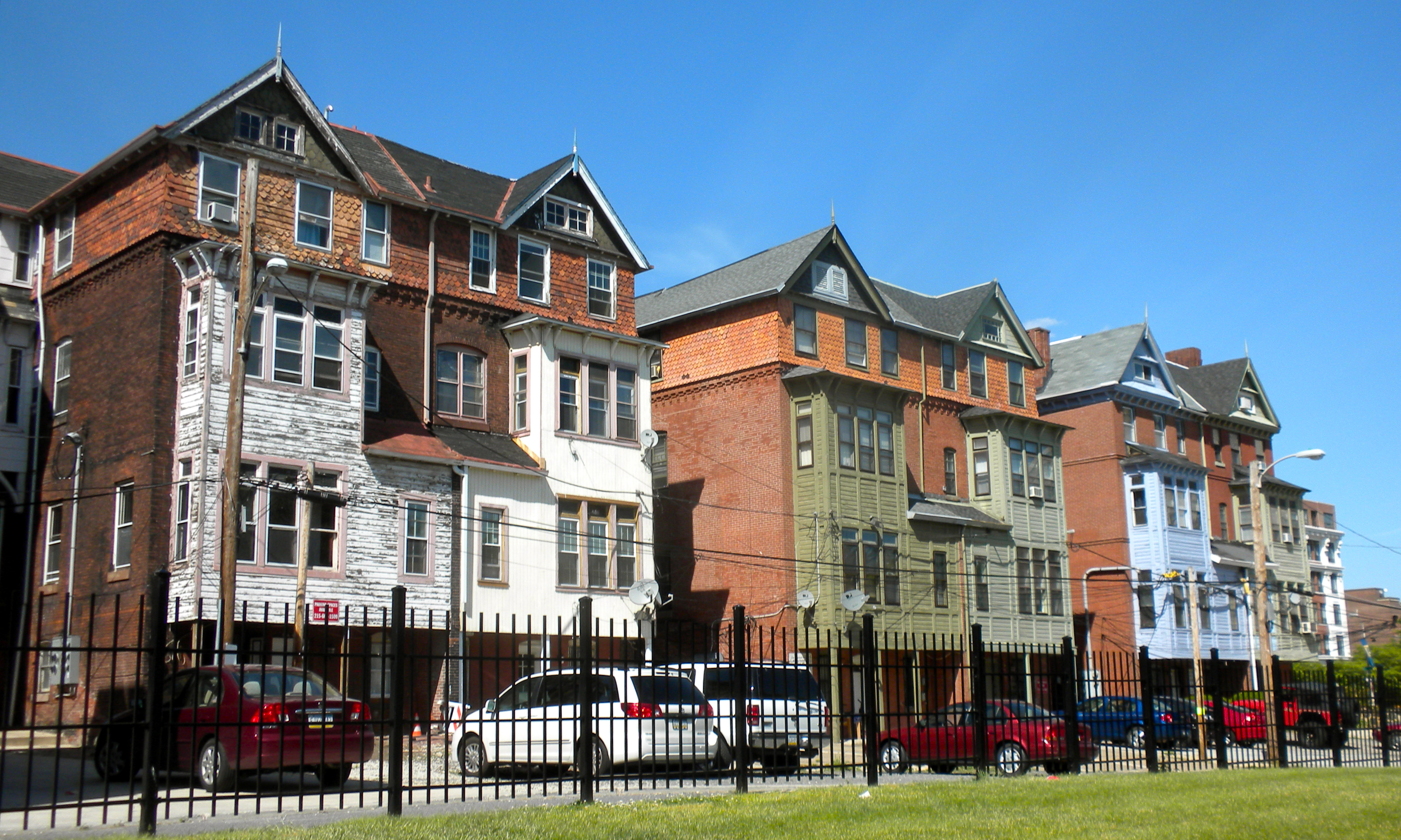
- Poth and Schmidt Development Houses (rear), May 2010

- Location within Philadelphia Location within Pennsylvania Location within the United States
- Location: 3306-3316 Arch St., Philadelphia, Pennsylvania
- Coordinates: 39°57′27″N 75°11′26″W
- Area: 0.4 acres (0.16 ha)
- Built: 1890
- Architect: Dilks, A. W.
- Architectural style: Queen Anne
- NRHP reference No.: 83002276
- Added to NRHP: April 21, 1983

The Poth and Schmidt Development Houses is a set of six, historic, American double houses located in the Powelton Village neighborhood of Philadelphia, Pennsylvania.

These houses were added to the National Register of Historic Places in 1983.

== History and architectural features ==
Built in 1890, these historic structures are three-story brick buildings that were designed in the Queen Anne style. They feature mansard roofs with terra cotta shingles, front porches, and projecting three-story bay windows. The house that is located at 3314-3316 Arch Street has a corner tower.

== Gallery ==
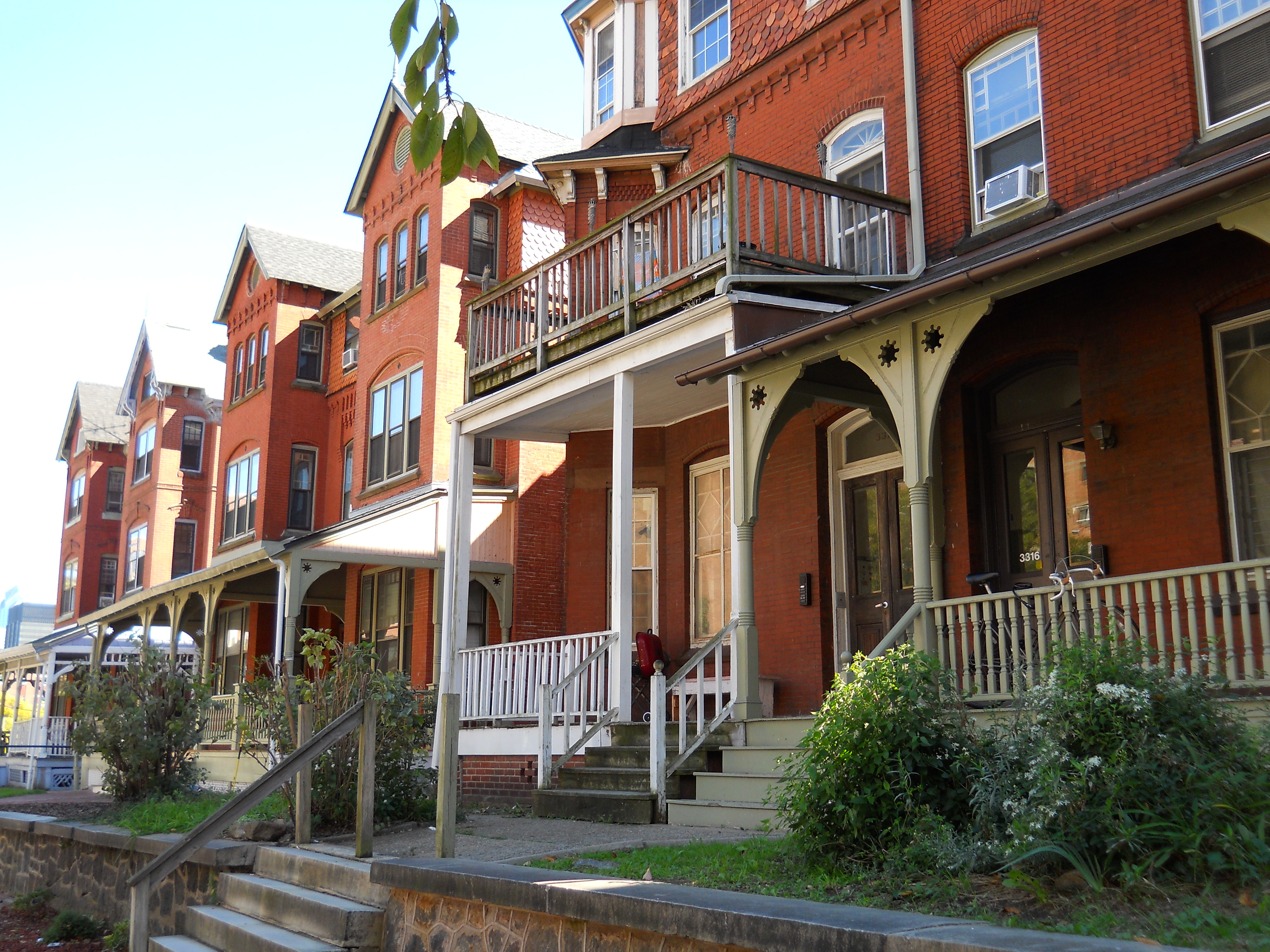

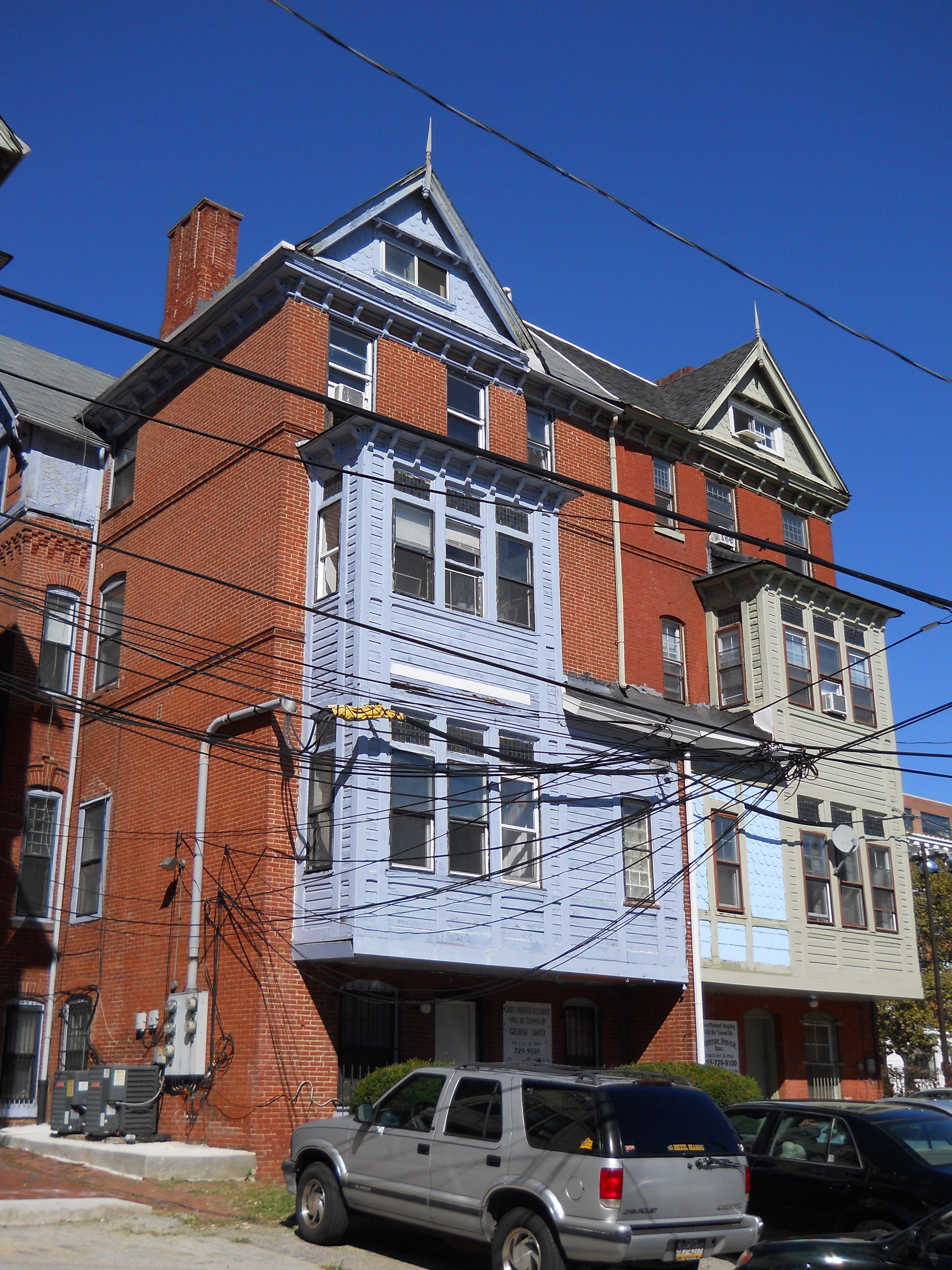
3306-3308 Arch St.

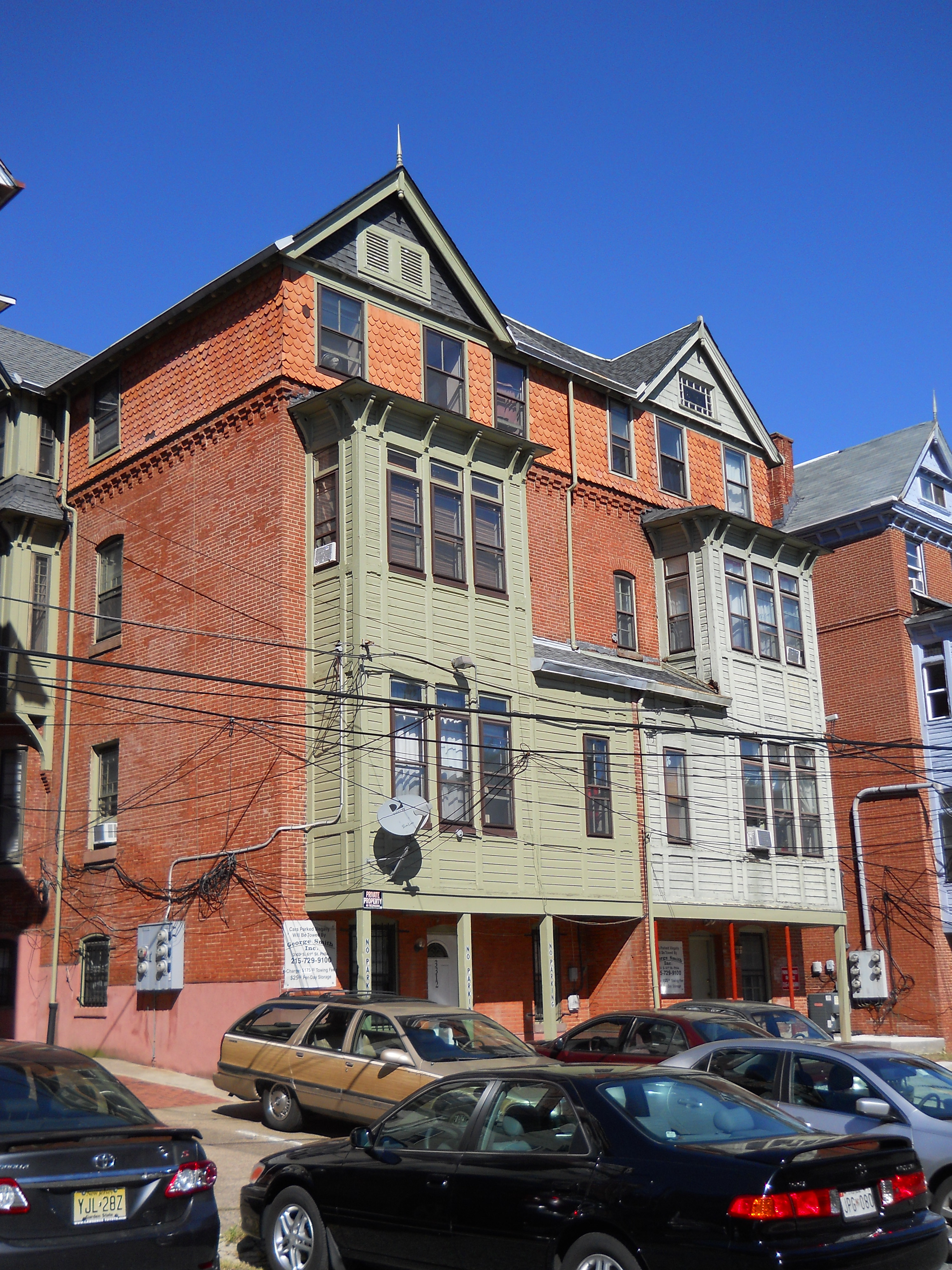
3310-3312 Arch St.

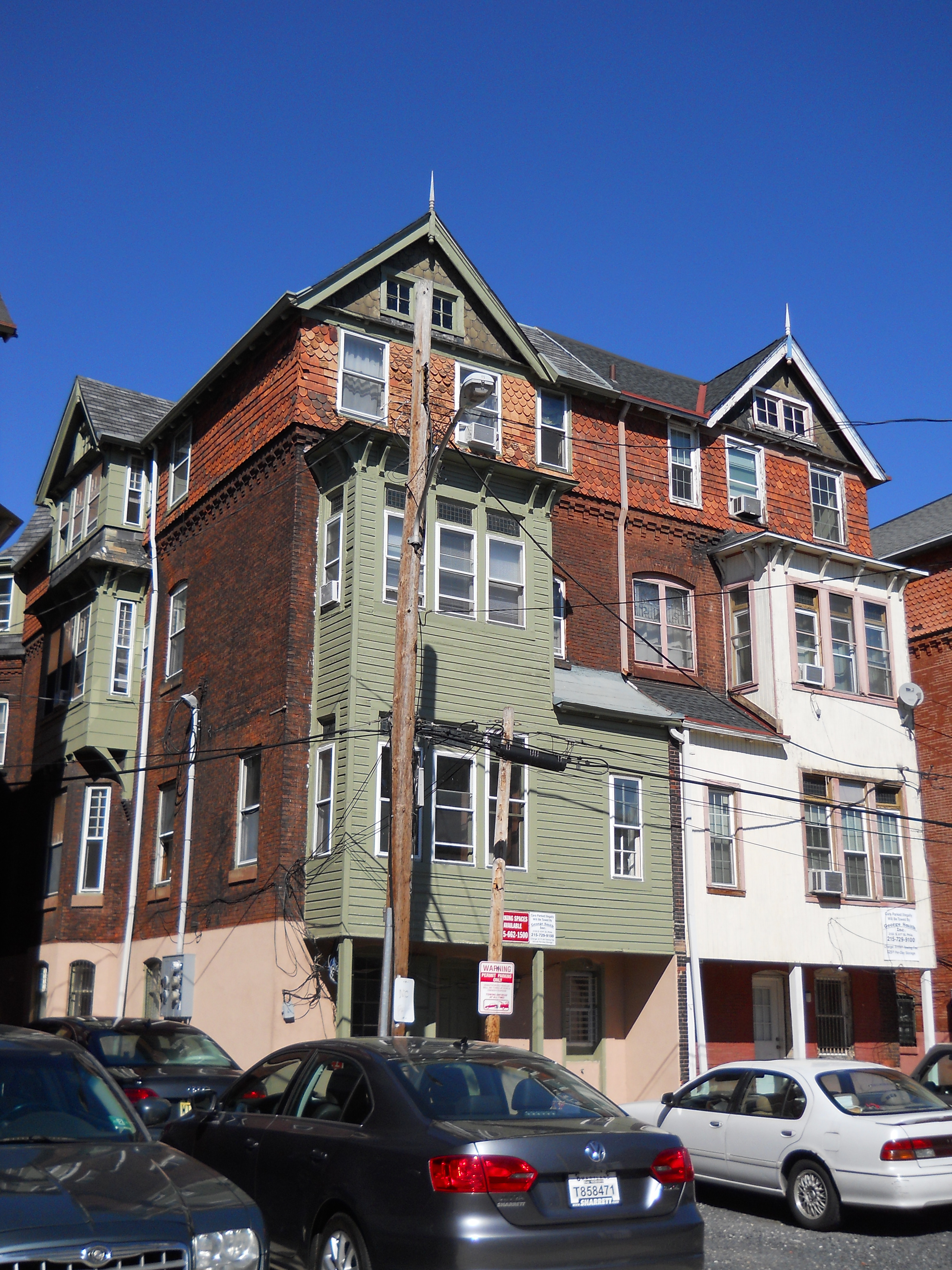
3314-3316 Arch St.
