= Garden Court, Philadelphia =

- Garden Court Historic District
- U.S. National Register of Historic Places
- U.S. Historic district
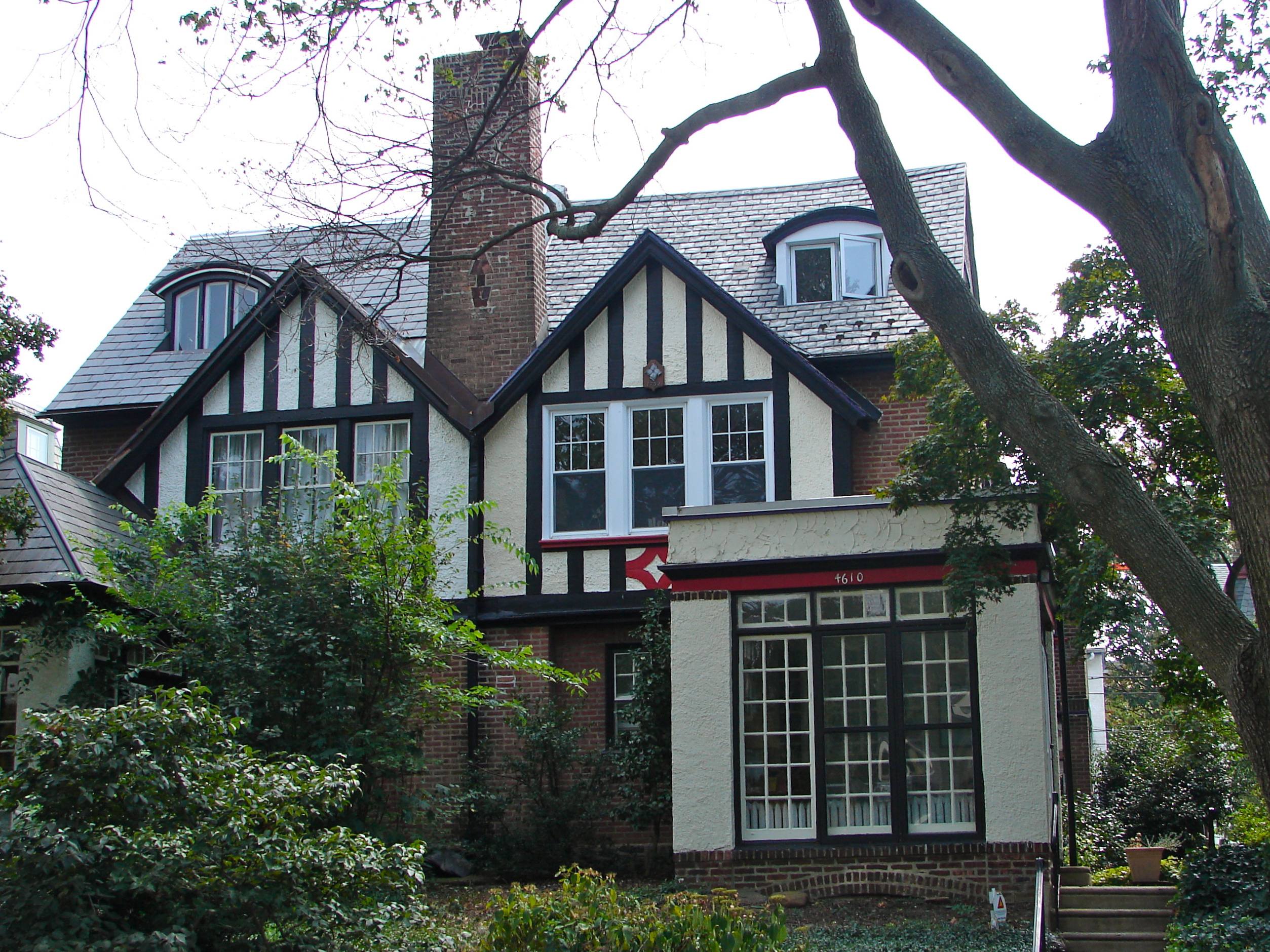

- Location within Philadelphia Location within Pennsylvania Location within the United States
- Location: Philadelphia, Pennsylvania, U.S.
- Coordinates: 39°57′7″N 75°13′7″W
- Area: 35 acres (14 ha)
- Built: 1919
- Architect: Clarence Siegal
- Architectural style: Late 19th and 20th Century Revivals, Bungalow/Craftsman
- NRHP reference No.: 84003539
- Added to NRHP: July 5, 1984

Garden Court is a neighborhood in the West Philadelphia section of Philadelphia, Pennsylvania, United States. It is situated between 45th and 52nd Streets and stretches from Locust Street south to Cedar Street. There is overlap in area with the nearby neighborhoods of Walnut Hill, Spruce Hill, and Cedar Park.

== History ==
In the 1920s, The Philadelphia Inquirer called Garden Court "the most exclusive location in West Philadelphia." Garden Court was placed on the National Register of Historic Places on July 5, 1984. The neighborhood contains a diverse mix of housing types, including the 116-unit Garden Court Condominiums. It is a racially diverse neighborhood. Income and property values are greater than those of West Philadelphia as a whole.

The neighborhood is predominantly residential, but contains small rows of shops around the intersections of 48th and Spruce, and 47th and Pine.

== Demographics ==
At the 2020 Census, 8,207 people lived in Garden Court. The racial composition of the neighborhood was 48.3% White alone, 32.7% Black alone, 8.3% Asian alone, 0.2% American Indian and Alaska Native alone, 2.1% some other race, and 8.3% multiracial. 6.9% of residents were Hispanic or Latino.

== Education ==
The School District of Philadelphia operates the Henry C. Lea Elementary school in the neighborhood. It is a public, K-8 school, located at 47th Street and Locust Street. The West Philly Cooperative School also operates in the neighborhood, it is a preschool.

== Public transit ==
SEPTA has 3 bus routes running through the neighborhood. The Market-Frankford Line is nearby, further North, and the Route 34 trolley is also nearby, slightly South.

=== Bus Routes ===
42, 52, 64
