= Pennsylvania Railroad Office Building =

- U.S. National Register of Historic Places
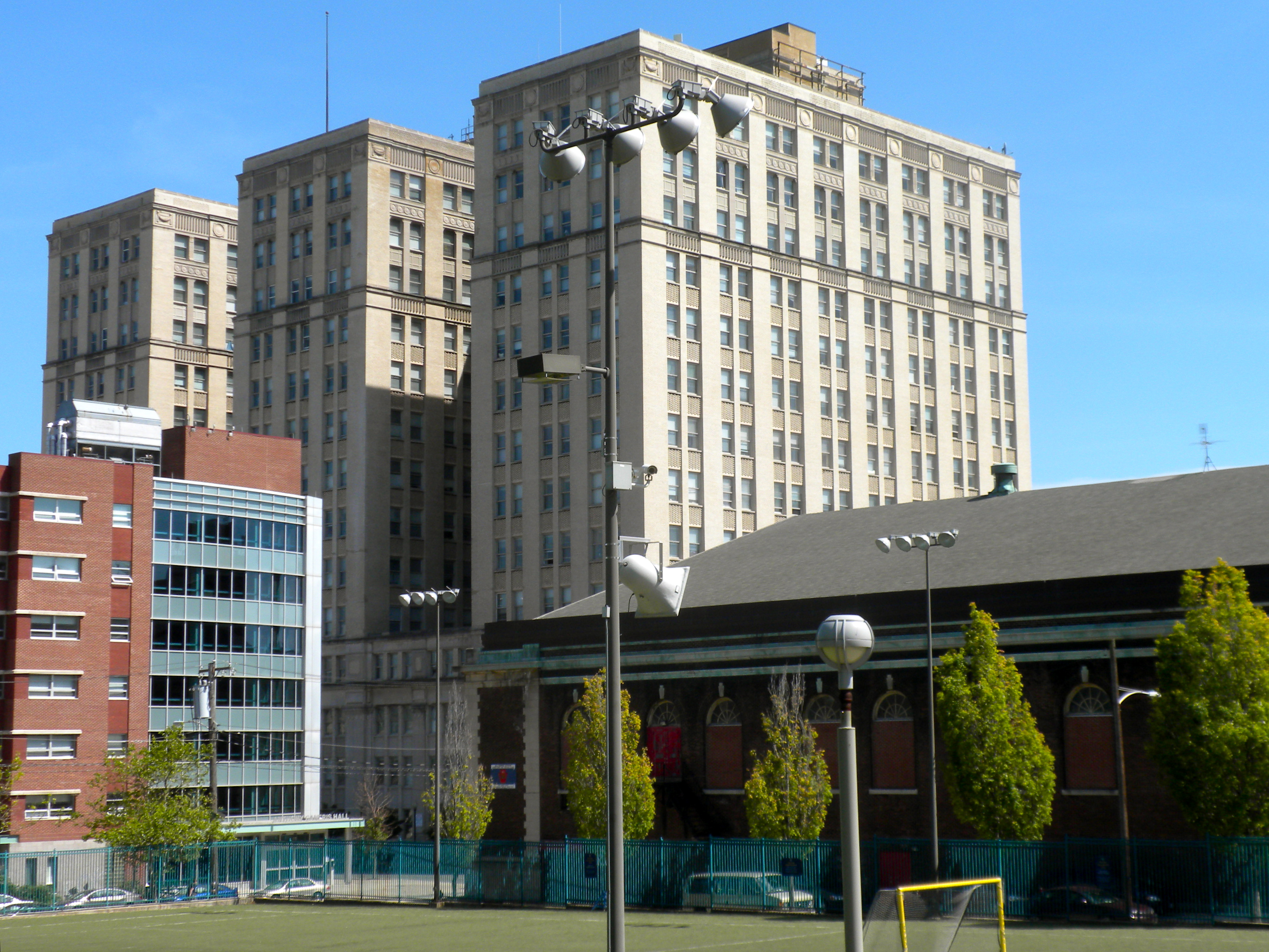
- Pennsylvania Railroad Office Building, May 2010

- Location within Philadelphia Location within Pennsylvania Location within the United States
- Location: 3175 John F. Kennedy Blvd., Philadelphia, Pennsylvania
- Coordinates: 39°57′21″N 75°11′16″W
- Area: 1.3 acres (0.53 ha)
- Built: 1927
- Architect: Graham, Anderson, Probst & White
- Architectural style: Classical Revival
- NRHP reference No.: 03000071
- Added to NRHP: February 27, 2003

The Pennsylvania Railroad Office Building is an historic office building that is located in the University City neighborhood of Philadelphia, Pennsylvania, United States.

It was added to the National Register of Historic Places in 2003.

== History and architectural features ==
Built by the Pennsylvania Railroad in 1927, this historic structure is a fourteen-story, brick and limestone building that was designed in the Classical Revival style. It consists of a four-story, limestone and terra cotta base, topped by a ten-story, E-shaped tower of buff-colored brick.

The building is currently known as University Crossings and provides student housing as well as classroom, laboratory, and office space for Drexel University.

== Gallery ==
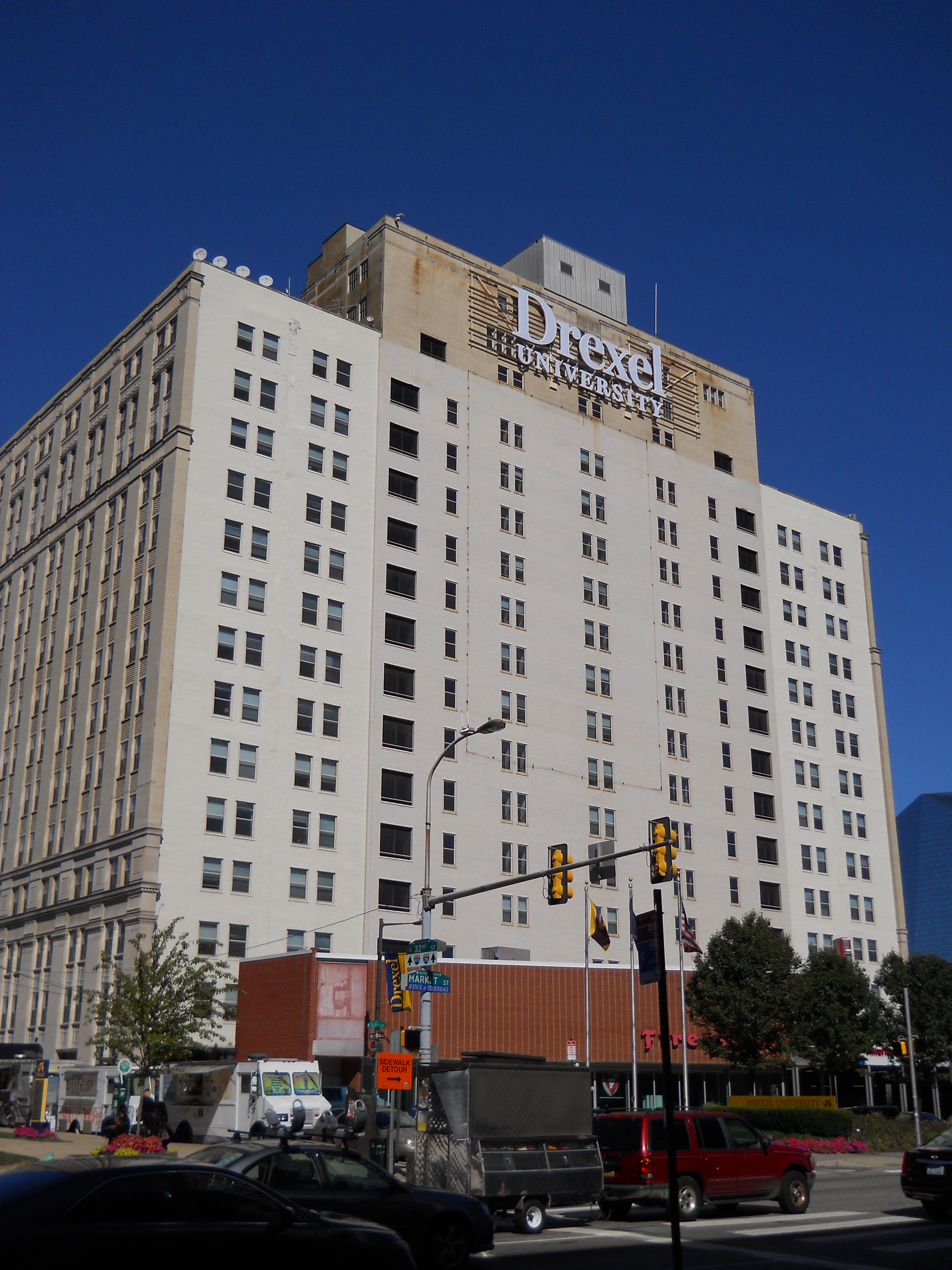
The view from Market St.

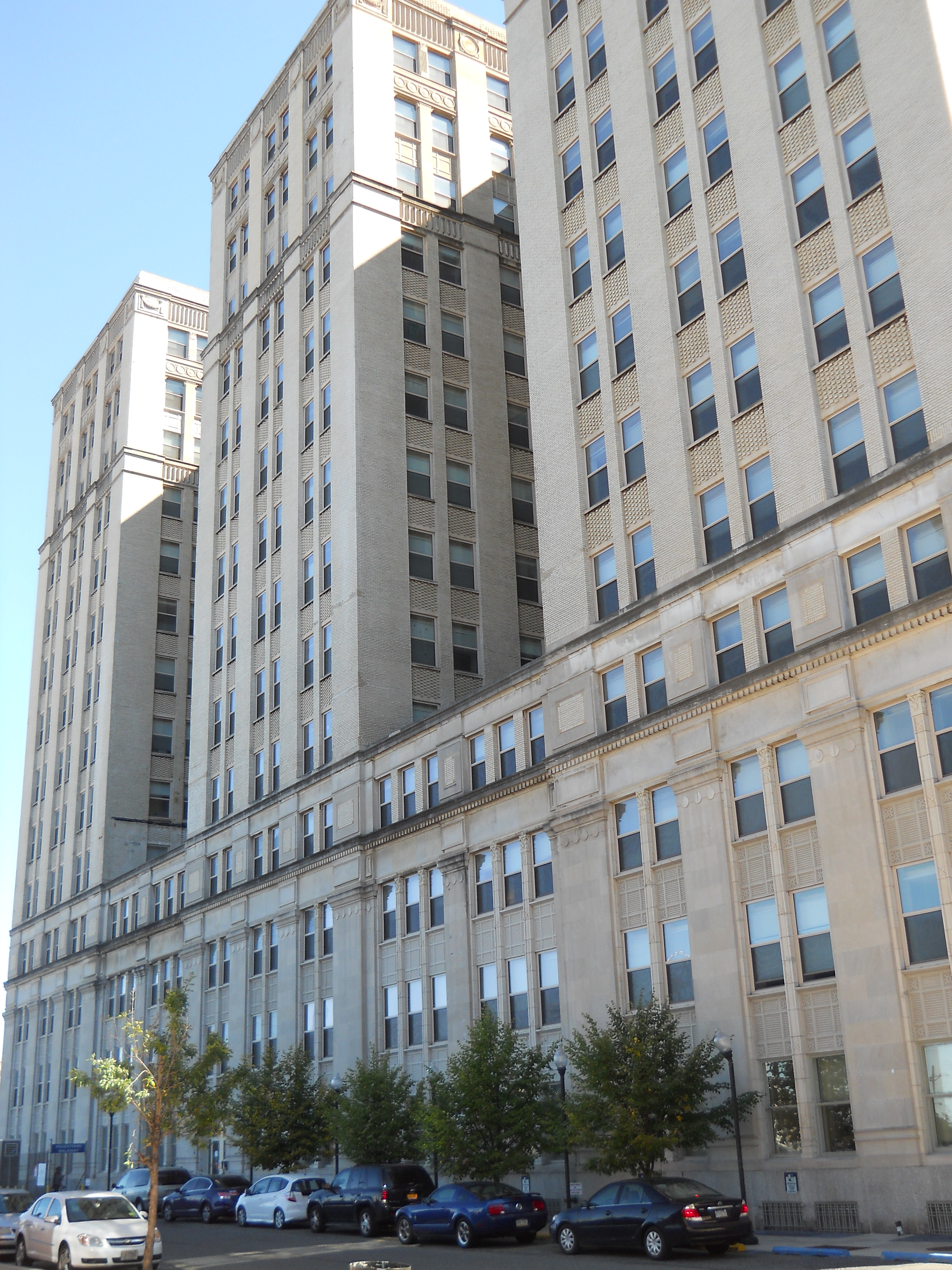
Towers

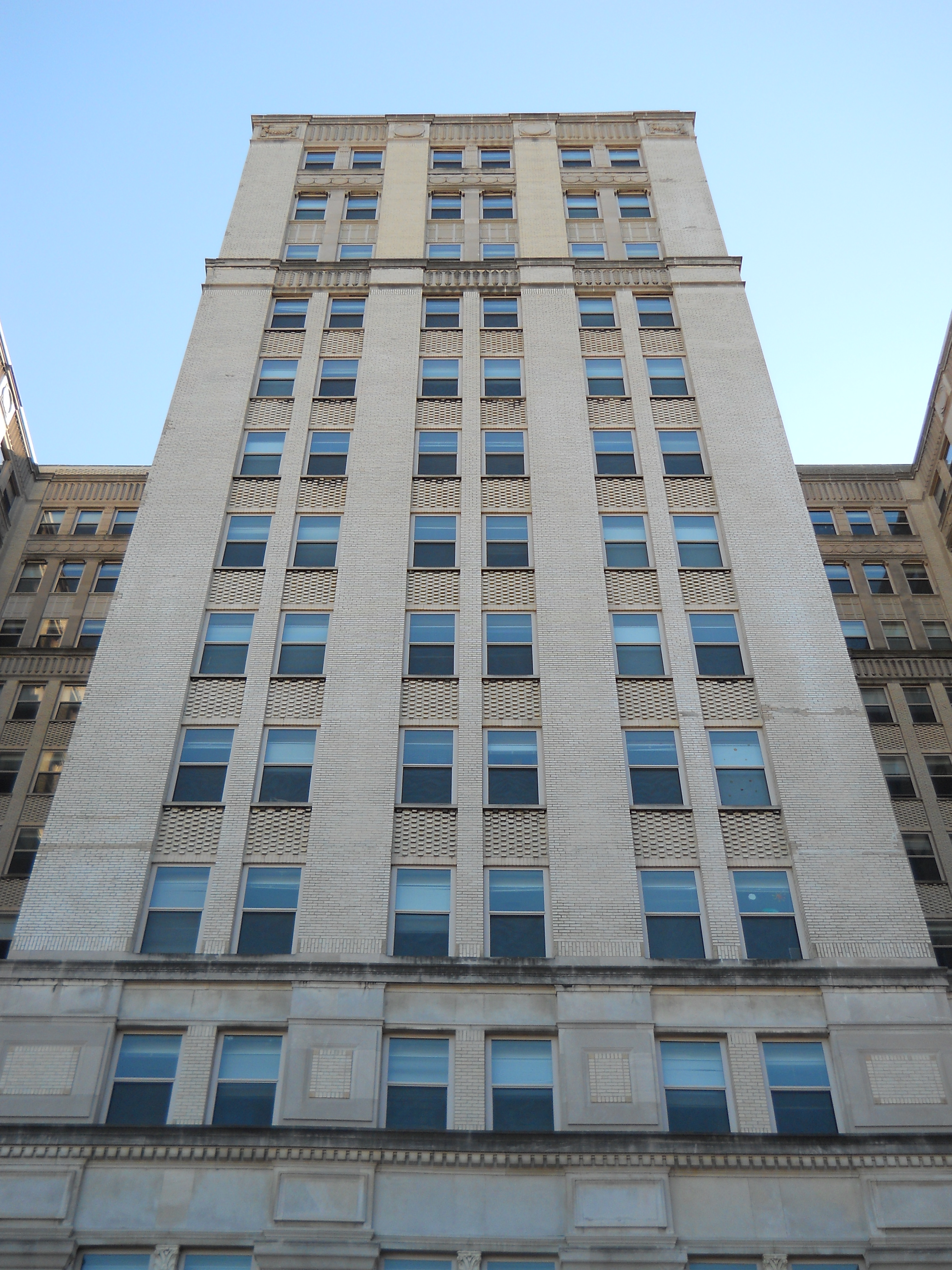
Central Tower
