= Mill Creek, Philadelphia =

Mill Creek
- Neighborhood of Philadelphia
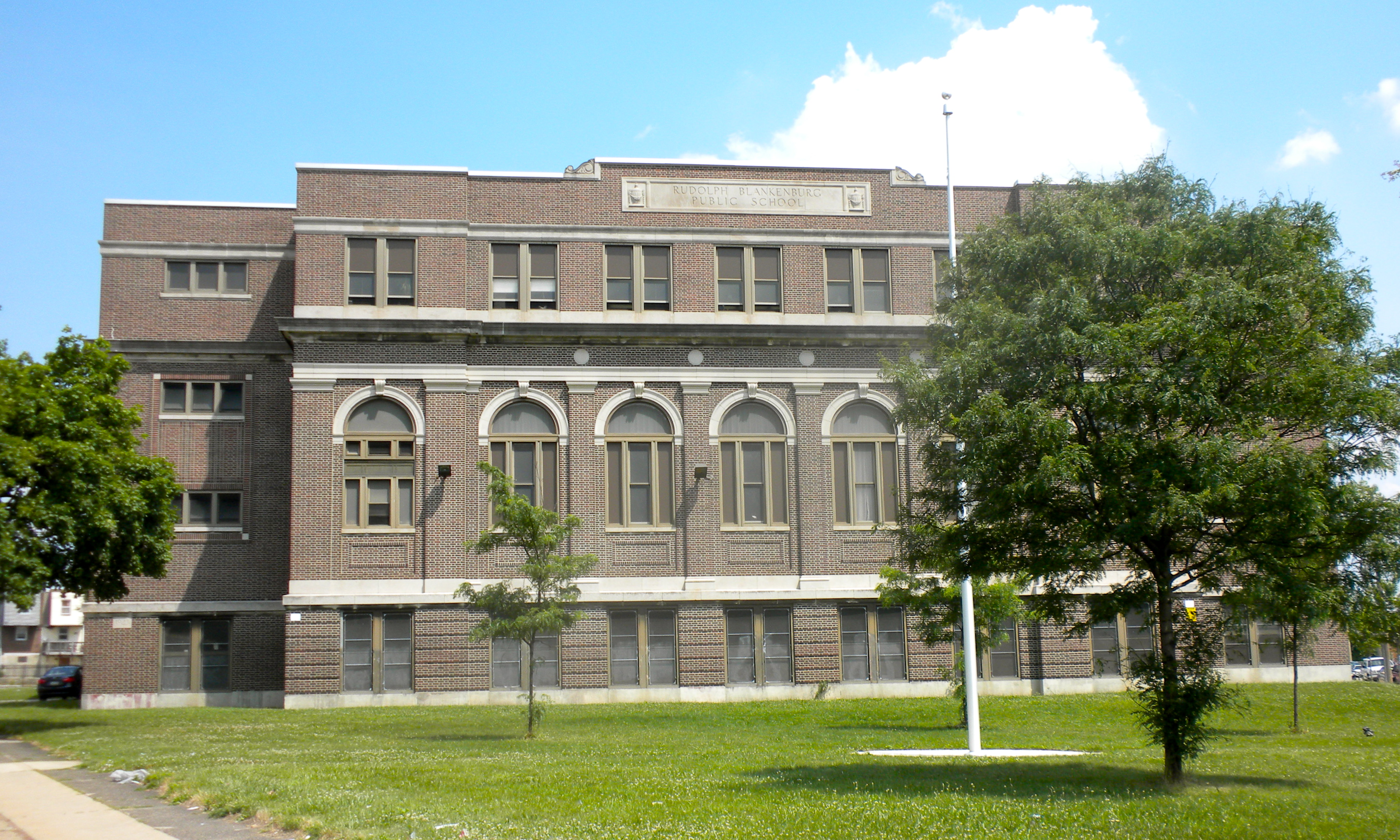
- Rudolph Blankenburg School in Mill Creek, June 2010

- Location within Philadelphia
- Country: United States
- State: Pennsylvania
- County: Philadelphia
- City: Philadelphia
- Area codes: 215, 267, and 445

Mill Creek is a neighborhood in the West Philadelphia section of Philadelphia, Pennsylvania, United States. It sits between 44th and 52nd Streets, north of Market Street and south of Girard Avenue. It was named for Philadelphia's Mill Creek, which was buried during 19th-century sewer system improvements. In 1961, the sewer collapsed, taking homes with it.

== History and architectural features ==
During the early 1800s, Mill Creek was used as a water and power supply source by area lumber companies and gristmills. Sometime after the end of the American Civil War, as Philadelphia's population continued to grow, business and civic leader determined that upgrades were needed to the city's sewer system. One of the projects involved diverting a section of Mill Creek through an underground brick-covered sewer culvert, which was then covered over by landfill. This decision ultimately created "a submerged floodplain" that resulted in sewer collapses during the 20th century.

In 1849, the Roman Catholic Archdiocese of Philadelphia purchased farm land in Mills Creek to create Cathedral Cemetery, the first Catholic cemetery in Philadelphia to support burials due to the influx of Catholic immigrants from Ireland and Germany.

The neighborhood was formerly home to the Mill Creek Apartments, a public housing project that was designed by Louis Kahn during the early 1950s. Its three 17-story highrise project towers were demolished in 2002 and replaced with suburban-style low-rise houses, a development named Lucien Blackwell Homes after the congressman.

Mill Creek was the site of the 2000 "Lex Street Massacre," in which four men killed seven others and wounded three in retaliation for damage to a car, Philadelphia's worst killing spree in modern history.

The Rudolph Blankenburg School, the Mayer Sulzberger Junior High School, and Institute of the Pennsylvania Hospital are listed on the National Register of Historic Places.
