= La Blanche Apartments =

- U.S. National Register of Historic Places
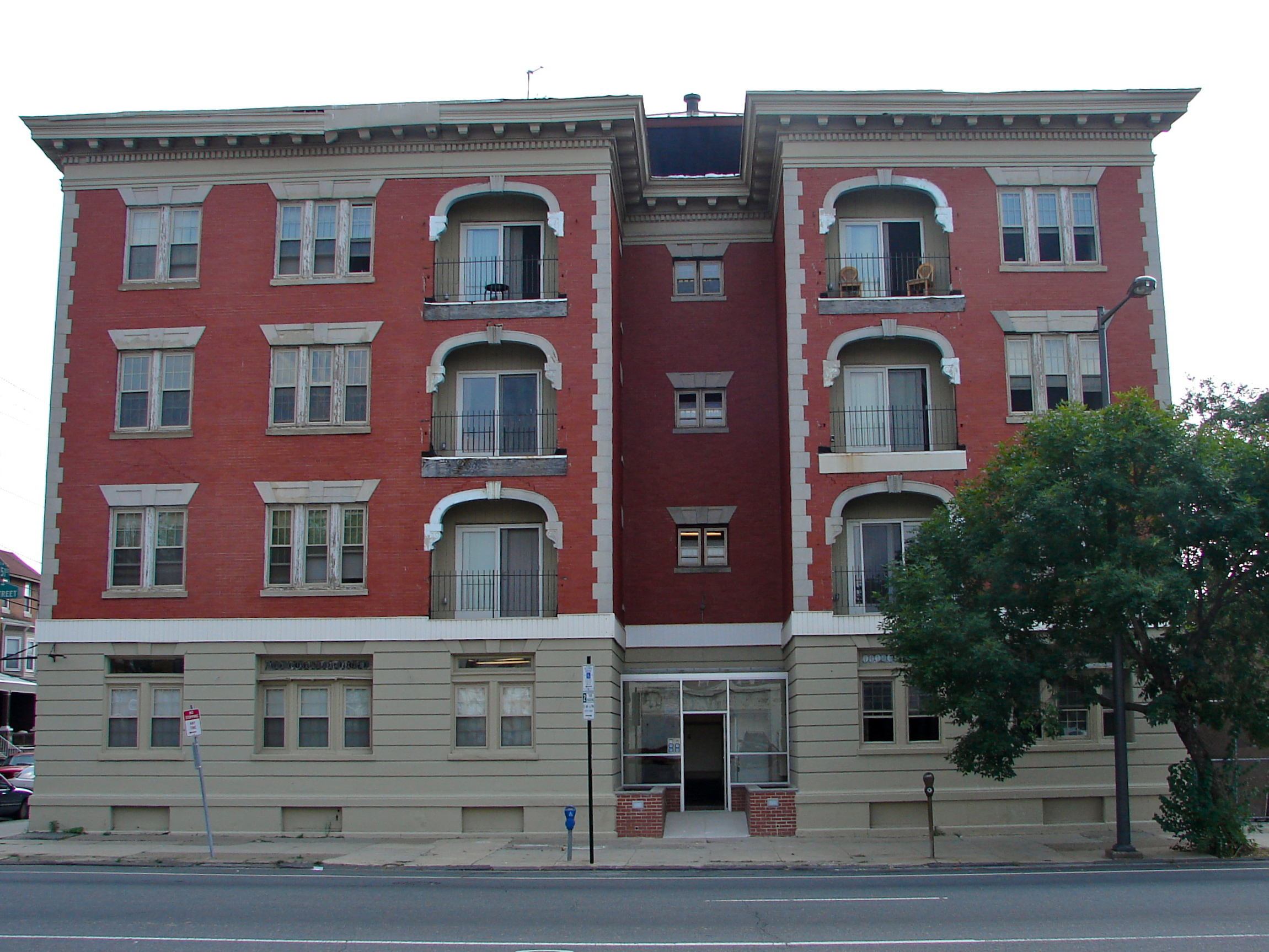
- North elevation along Walnut Street

- Location within Philadelphia Location within Pennsylvania Location within the United States
- Location: 5100 Walnut St., Philadelphia, Pennsylvania
- Coordinates: 39°57′22″N 75°13′28″W
- Area: 0.2 acres (0.081 ha)
- Built: 1910
- Architect: Anderson & Haupt
- Architectural style: Colonial Revival, Georgian Revival
- NRHP reference No.: 85000470
- Added to NRHP: March 07, 1985

The La Blanche Apartments is an historic building in West Philadelphia, Pennsylvania, United States.

== History and architectural features ==
Built in 1910, this historic structure was designed in the Georgian Revival style. Part of the second wave of a housing boom in West Philadelphia that started with the completion of the Market Street Elevated line in 1907, this building was also one of the first large apartment buildings ever built in Philadelphia. It helped give the rising middle class better access to housing. Originally, this four-story building housed just twenty-six apartments, but as the neighborhood became less fashionable, the apartments were subdivided into a total of forty-nine units

== Gallery ==
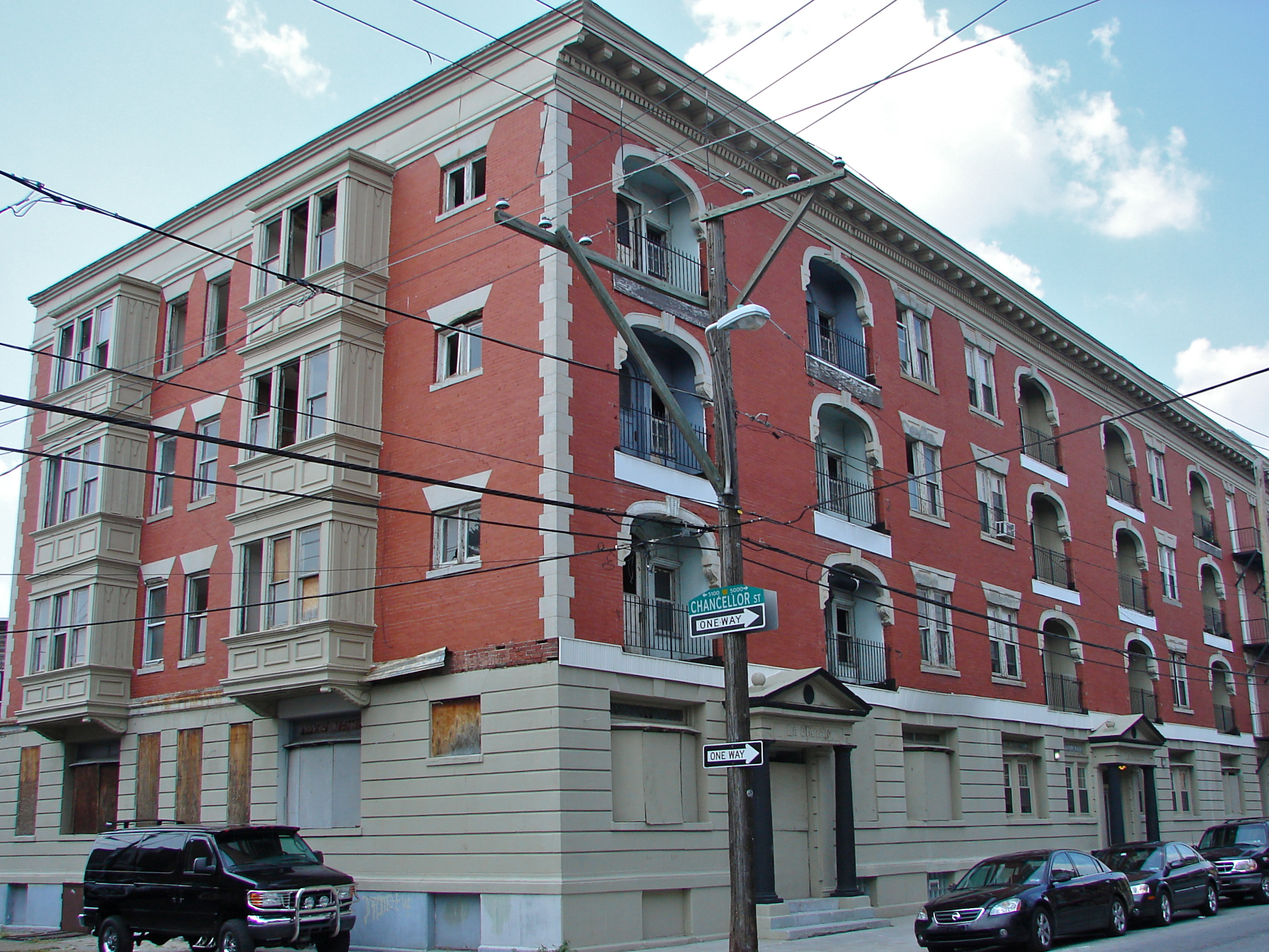
View of building's south and east sides

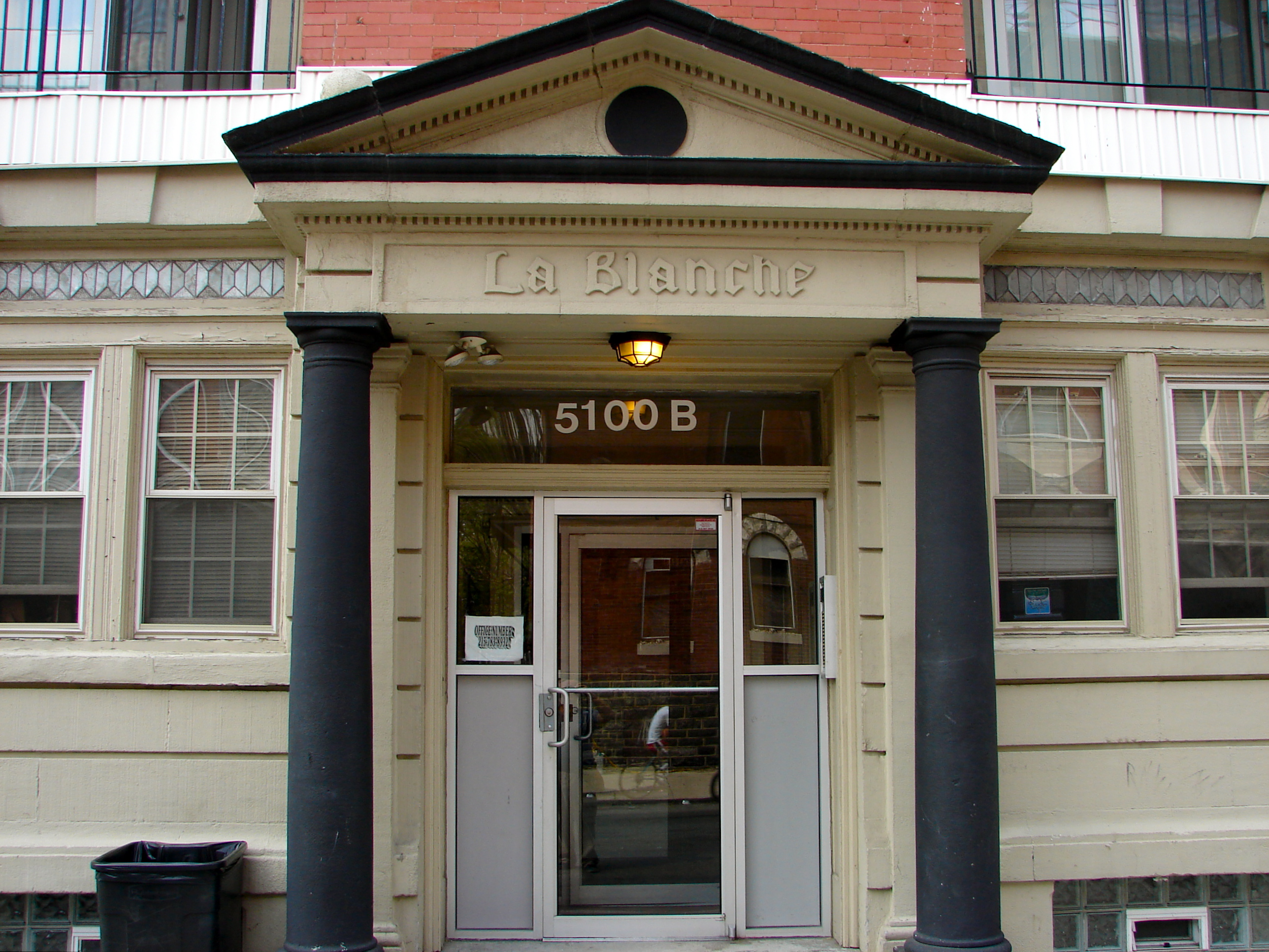
Entrance on 51st Street
