= Spruce Hill, Philadelphia =

Spruce Hill
- Neighborhood of Philadelphia
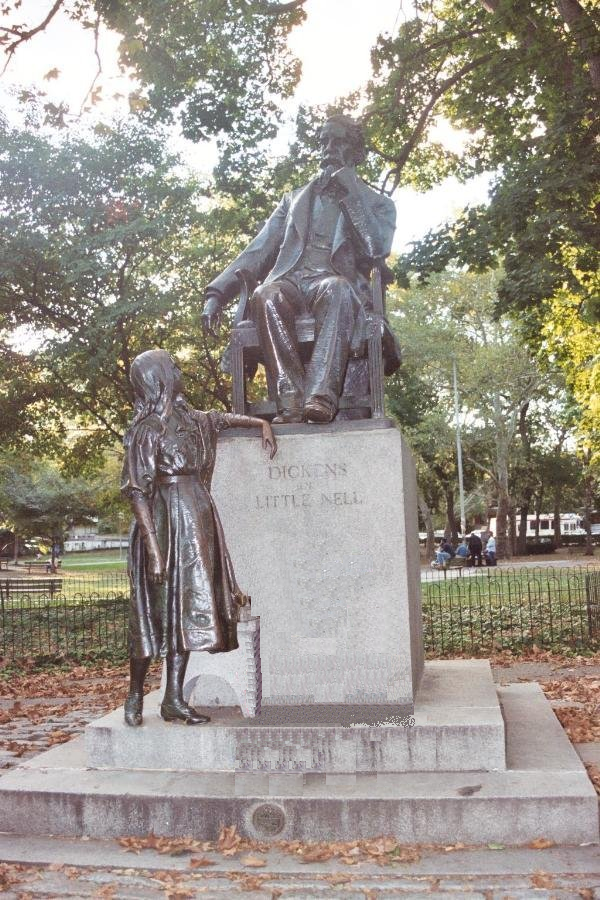
- Dickens and Little Nell Statue in Clark Park in Spruce Hill

- Location within Philadelphia
- Coordinates: 39°57′14″N 75°12′36″W
- Country: United States
- State: Pennsylvania
- County: Philadelphia
- City: Philadelphia
- Area codes: 215, 267 and 445

Spruce Hill is a neighborhood in the University City section of West Philadelphia, Pennsylvania, United States. It is situated between 38th and 46th streets and stretches from Market Street south to Woodland Avenue.

== History ==
This neighborhood was built as a streetcar suburb for Center City between 1850 and 1910. Among its most prominent developers was financier Clarence Howard Clark Sr. (1833 – 1906), who built dozens of rowhouses, donated land for the Walnut Street West Branch of the Free Library of Philadelphia, settled a tax assessment by founding the 9.1-acre Clark Park, and established his mansion on the grassy block that today holds the Penn Alexander public elementary school. A statue of Charles Dickens, cast in 1890 by Francis Edwin Elwell, stands in Clark Park; it is one of just two known statues of Charles Dickens.

After the high-profile killing of a University of Pennsylvania research associate, Vladimir Sled, on October 31, 1996, at the 4300 block of Larchwood Avenue, community members advocated for more investment from the university in the neighborhood. The university's president at the time, Judith Rodin, responded with the West Philadelphia Initiatives. The initiatives involved increased police presence, incentives for faculty buying homes in the neighborhood, and building a new school.

In modern times, Spruce Hill is a racially and ethnically diverse part of the city, where multiple examples of historic architecture have been preserved, including a large number of Victorian rowhouses, many of which have been converted to multi-family apartments.

On July 12, 2024, the Philadelphia Historical Commission approved the creation of a historic district in the Southeast section of the neighborhood. The boundaries of the historic district runs roughly between 39th and 43rd streets from Spruce Street to Woodland Avenue.

== Demographics ==
At the 2020 Census, 20,721 people lived in Spruce Hill. The racial composition of the neighborhood was 47.7% White alone, 27.3% Asian alone, 14.1% Black alone, 0.2% American Indian and Alaska Native alone, 2.8% some other race, and 7.8% multiracial. 7.6% of residents were Hispanic or Latino.

About 16.4% of Spruce Hill's population was living in college or university student housing.

== Education ==
The School District of Philadelphia operates the Paul Robeson High School for Human Services as well as Penn Alexander School, a K-8 public school. The school was built in 2001 as a partnership between the school district and The University of Pennsylvania. The university contributes $1,330 per student annually to the school district to help keep the student-teacher ratio low.

The University of Pennsylvania campus extends into Spruce Hill. Saint Joseph's University has a 24-acre campus along Woodland Avenue, obtained in its 2022 merger with the University of the Sciences.

=== Public libraries ===
The Free Library of Philadelphia Walnut Street West Branch serves Spruce Hill.

== Public transit ==
SEPTA serves the neighborhood with multiple bus routes, subway–surface trolley lines, and the Market-Frankford Line. There are two stops for the Market-Frankford Line in the neighborhood, one at 40th Street and one at 46th Street. The neighborhood is also home to SEPTA's 40th Street Portal, where four street-running trolley lines descend into a tunnel with its own right-of-way. When the tunnel is closed, diversion tracks run through Spruce Hill to shuttle passengers to 40th Street Station for transfer to the Market-Frankford Line.

=== Bus Routes ===
21, 30, 40, 42

=== Trolley Lines ===
Route 11, Route 13, Route 34, Route 36

== See also ==
- Cedar Park, Philadelphia

== Gallery ==
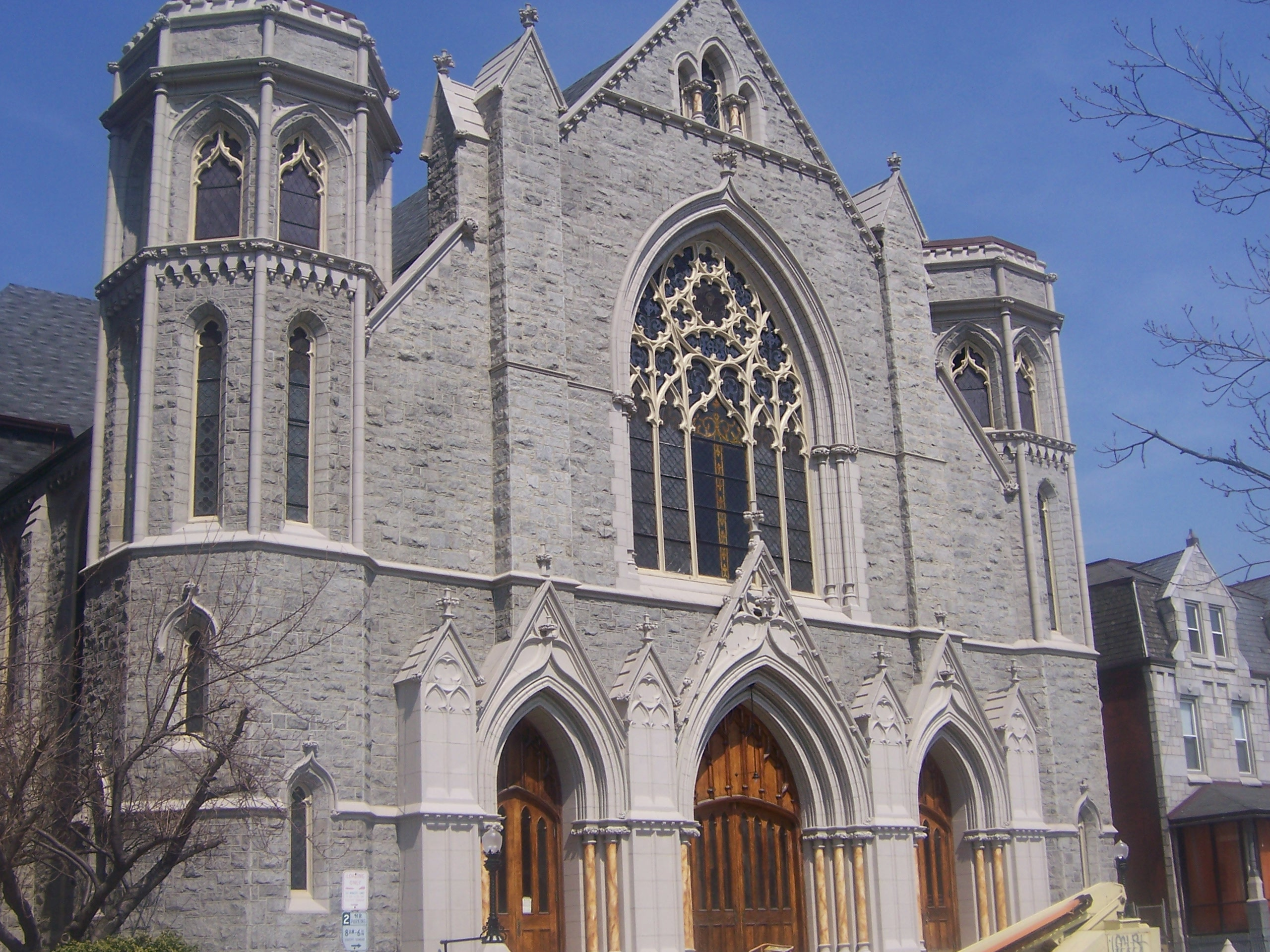
Chestnut Street Baptist Church

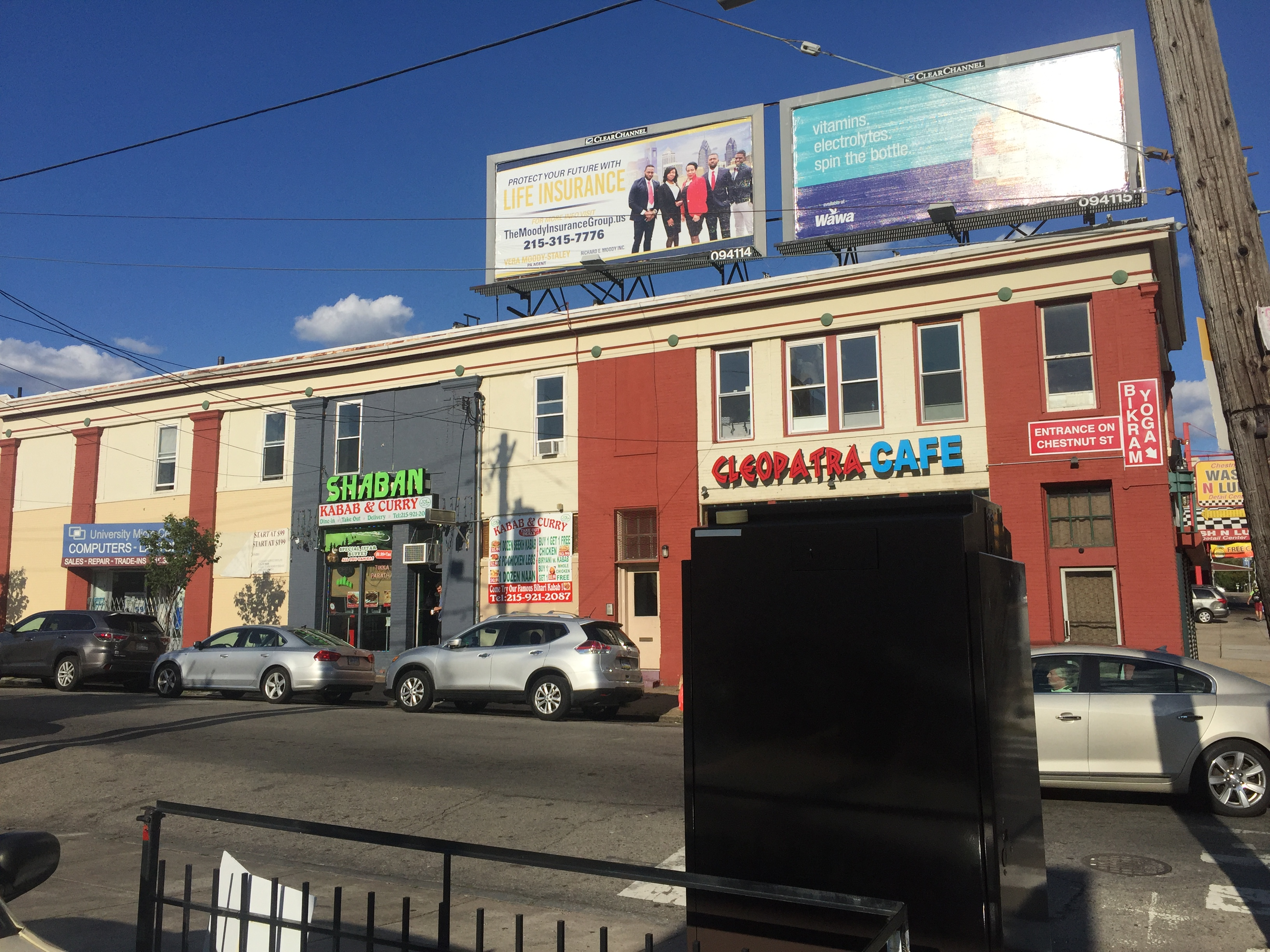
Ethnic restaurants on 42nd and Chestnut

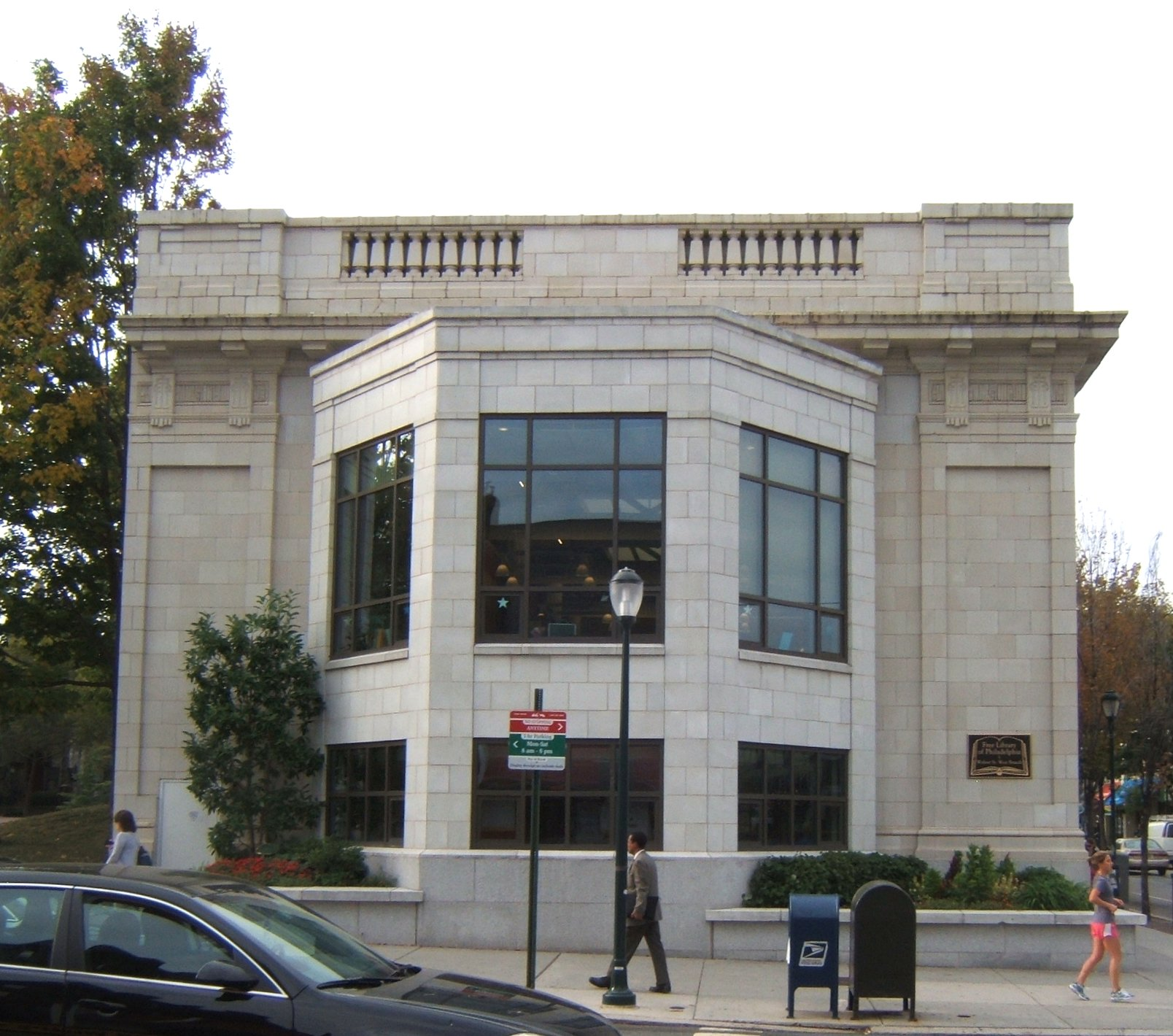
Walnut Street's West Branch Library
