= List of telephone company buildings =

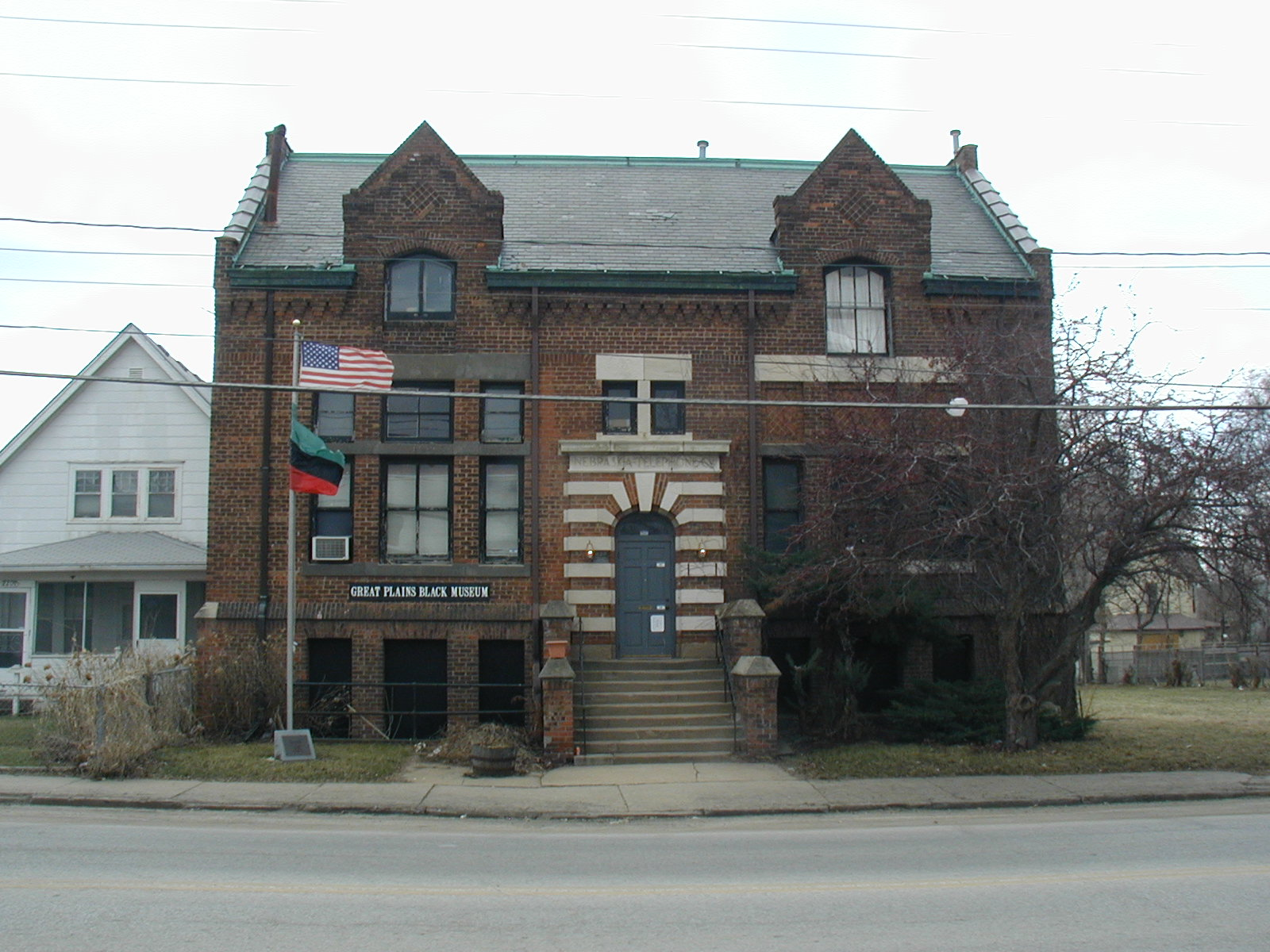
Webster Telephone Exchange Building, Omaha, Nebraska, USA

This is a list of notable telephone company buildings.

Telephone company buildings have played a key role in the telecommunications industry for more than a century. In 2008 it was stated that "the job for which these unassuming but ubiquitous brick houses were built, and the technology within them, are changing dramatically. In fact, it's tough to say what the CO will look like 10 years from now." Some challenges are "far higher power densities, heat dissipation requirements and power feeds than we ever built those locations for in the past," said Pieter Poll, chief technology officer for Qwest Communications.

A number of telephone company buildings have been listed on the U.S. National Register of Historic Places for their architecture; see Category:Telecommunications buildings on the National Register of Historic Places.

== United States ==
- Old Bell Telephone Building (Osceola, Arkansas), listed on the NRHP in Mississippi County, Arkansas
- Telephone Exchange Building (Powhatan, Arkansas), listed on the National Register of Historic Places in Lawrence County, Arkansas
- Mountain States Telephone and Telegraph Exchange Building (Prescott, Arizona), listed on the NRHP in Prescott, Arizona
- Telephone Building (Denver, Colorado), NRHP-listed
- Southern New England Telephone Company Building, Hartford, Connecticut, NRHP-listed
- Southern New England Telephone Company Administration Building, New Haven, Connecticut, Art Deco, NRHP-listed
- Telephone Exchange Building (Norwich, Connecticut), listed on the National Register of Historic Places in New London County, Connecticut
- Southern Bell Telephone Company Building, Atlanta, Georgia, listed on the NRHP in Georgia
- Rocky Mountain Bell Telephone Company Building (Idaho Falls, Idaho), listed on the NRHP in Bonneville County, Idaho
- Mountain States Telephone and Telegraph Company Building (Meridian, Idaho), listed on the NRHP in Ada County, Idaho
- Telephone Company Bungalow, Paris, Idaho, listed on the NRHP in Bear Lake County, Idaho
- Chicago Telephone Company Kedzie Exchange, Chicago, Illinois, listed on the NRHP in west side Chicago, Illinois
- Swedish American Telephone Company Building, Chicago, Illinois, listed on the NRHP in Near East Side, Chicago, Illinois
- Blackstone House and Martinsville Telephone Company Building, Martinsville, Indiana, listed on the NRHP in Morgan County, Indiana
- American Telephone & Telegraph Co. Building (Davenport, Iowa), NRHP-listed
- Union Electric Telephone & Telegraph, Davenport, Iowa, NRHP-listed
- Interior Telephone Company Building, Grinnell, Iowa, listed on the NRHP in Poweshiek County, Iowa
- New England Telephone Building, Quincy, Massachusetts
- Mountain States Telephone and Telegraph Company Building (Miles City, Montana), listed on the NRHP in Custer County, Montana
- Bell Telephone Building (St. Louis, Missouri), NRHP-listed
- Beaumont Telephone Exchange Building, St. Louis, Missouri, listed on the NRHP in St. Louis, Missouri
- Independent Telephone Company Building, Missoula, Montana, listed on the NRHP in Missoula County, Montana
- Lincoln Telephone & Telegraph Exchange Building in Fairmount, Fairmont, Nebraska, listed on the NRHP in Fillmore County, Nebraska
- Nebraska Telephone Company Building, Lincoln, Nebraska, listed on the NRHP in Lancaster County, Nebraska
- Webster Telephone Exchange Building, Omaha, Nebraska
- Bell Laboratories Building (Manhattan), known also as Bell Telephone Laboratories, New York, New York, NRHP-listed and a National Historic Landmark List of RHPs in NYC
- Central New York Telephone and Telegraph Building, Syracuse, New York, NRHP-listed, in Onondaga County
- Snow Camp Mutual Telephone Exchange Building, Snow Camp, North Carolina, listed on the NRHP in Alamance County, North Carolina
- Telephone Co. Building (Grand Forks, North Dakota), NRHP-listed, in Grand Forks County
- Cincinnati and Suburban Telephone Company Building, Cincinnati, Ohio, NRHP-listed
- Old Telephone Building (Fredericktown, Ohio), listed on the NRHP in Knox County, Ohio
- Marion County Telephone Company Building, Marion, Ohio, listed on the NRHP in Marion County, Ohio
- Southwestern Bell Telephone Building (Stroud, Oklahoma), listed on the NRHP in Lincoln County, Oklahoma
- Bell Telephone Company Building (Philadelphia, Pennsylvania), NRHP-listed
- Bell Telephone Exchange Building (Powelton Village, Philadelphia, Pennsylvania), listed on the NRHP in west Philadelphia, Pennsylvania
- Bell Telephone Building (Pittsburgh, Pennsylvania), a relatively tall building
- Providence Telephone Building, Providence, Rhode Island, NRHP-listed
- American Telephone and Telegraph Company Building (Denmark, South Carolina), listed on the NRHP in Bamberg County, South Carolina
- Southwestern Telegraph and Telephone Building, Austin, Texas, listed on the NRHP in Travis County, Texas
- San Angelo Telephone Company Building, San Angelo, Texas, listed on the NRHP in Tom Green County, Texas
- San Marcos Telephone Company, San Marcos, Texas, listed on the NRHP in Hays County, Texas
- Mountain States Telephone and Telegraph Building (Brigham City, Utah), listed on the NRHP in Box Elder County, Utah
- Mountain States Telephone and Telegraph Co. Garage, Salt Lake City, Utah, listed on the NRHP in Salt Lake City, Utah
- Pacific Telephone and Telegraph Building, Longview, Washington, listed on the NRHP in Cowlitz County, Washington
- Sunset Telephone & Telegraph Building, Tacoma, Washington, listed on the NRHP in Pierce County, Washington
- Vancouver Telephone Building (Vancouver, Washington), listed on the NRHP in Clark County, Washington
- Chesapeake and Potomac Telephone Company Building, Washington, D.C., listed on the NRHP in Northwest Quadrant, Washington, D.C.
- Chesapeake and Potomac Telephone Company Warehouse and Repair Facility, Washington, D.C., National Register of Historic Places listings in Washington, D.C.
- Chesapeake and Potomac Telephone Company, Old Main Building, Washington, D.C., listed on the NRHP in Northwest Quadrant, Washington, D.C.
- Wisconsin Telephone Company Building, La Crosse, Wisconsin, listed on the NRHP in La Crosse County, Wisconsin

== See also ==
- Telephone Company Building (disambiguation)
- Bell Telephone Building (disambiguation)
- Mountain States Telephone and Telegraph Building (disambiguation)
- Telephone Exchange Building (disambiguation)
