= Telephone Company Building =

Telephone Building, Old Telephone Building, Telephone Company Building, or variations with abbreviations or otherwise, may refer to:

- American Telephone & Telegraph Co. Building (Davenport, Iowa)
- American Telephone and Telegraph Company Building (Denmark, South Carolina)
- Old Bell Telephone Building (Osceola, Arkansas)
- Old Telephone Building (Fredericktown, Ohio), listed on the NRHP in Knox County, Ohio
- Telephone Building (Denver, Colorado), NRHP-listed
- Telephone Co. Building (Grand Forks, North Dakota), NRHP-listed
- Telephone Company Bungalow, Paris, Idaho, listed on the NRHP in Bear Lake County, Idaho
- Telephone Exchange Building (Norwich, Connecticut)
- Telephone Exchange Building (Powhatan, Arkansas)
- Previous name for the Verizon/AT&T Building

== See also ==
- List of telephone company buildings
- Bell Telephone Building (disambiguation)
- Mountain States Telephone and Telegraph Building (disambiguation)
- Telephone Exchange Building (disambiguation)
- TCB (disambiguation)
