= Bell Telephone Building =

Bell Telephone Building, or variations, may refer to:

== Canada ==
- Bell Telephone Building (Montreal)

== United States ==
- Old Bell Telephone Building (Osceola, Arkansas)
- Southern Bell Telephone Company Building, Atlanta, Georgia
- Tower Square (Atlanta), Georgia, formerly known as Southern Bell Center
- Rocky Mountain Bell Telephone Company Building (Idaho Falls, Idaho)
- Oak Tower, or Bell Telephone Building, Kansas City, Missouri
- Bell Telephone Building (St. Louis, Missouri)
- Bell Laboratories Building, Manhattan, New York
- Southwestern Bell Telephone Building (Stroud, Oklahoma), listed on the NRHP in Lincoln County, Oklahoma
- Bell Telephone Company Building (Philadelphia), Pennsylvania
- Bell Telephone Exchange Building (Powelton Village, Philadelphia, Pennsylvania)
- Bell Telephone Building (Pittsburgh), Pennsylvania

== See also ==
- List of telephone company buildings
- Bell Telephone (disambiguation)
- Telephone Company Building (disambiguation)
- Bell Building (disambiguation)
