= Mountain States Telephone and Telegraph Building =

Mountain States Telephone and Telegraph Building or variations may refer to:

- Mountain States Telephone and Telegraph Building (Brigham City, Utah), NRHP-listed in Box Elder County
- Mountain States Telephone and Telegraph Co. Garage, Salt Lake City, Utah, NRHP-listed in Salt Lake City
- Mountain States Telephone and Telegraph Company Building (Meridian, Idaho), NRHP-listed in Ada County
- Mountain States Telephone and Telegraph Company Building (Miles City, Montana), NRHP-listed in Custer County
- Mountain States Telephone and Telegraph Exchange Building (Prescott, Arizona), listed on the National Register of Historic Places (NRHP) in Yavapai County

== See also ==
- Telephone Company Building (disambiguation)
