= Mantua, Philadelphia =

Neighborhood of Philadelphia

Mantua Avenue
- Neighborhood of Philadelphia
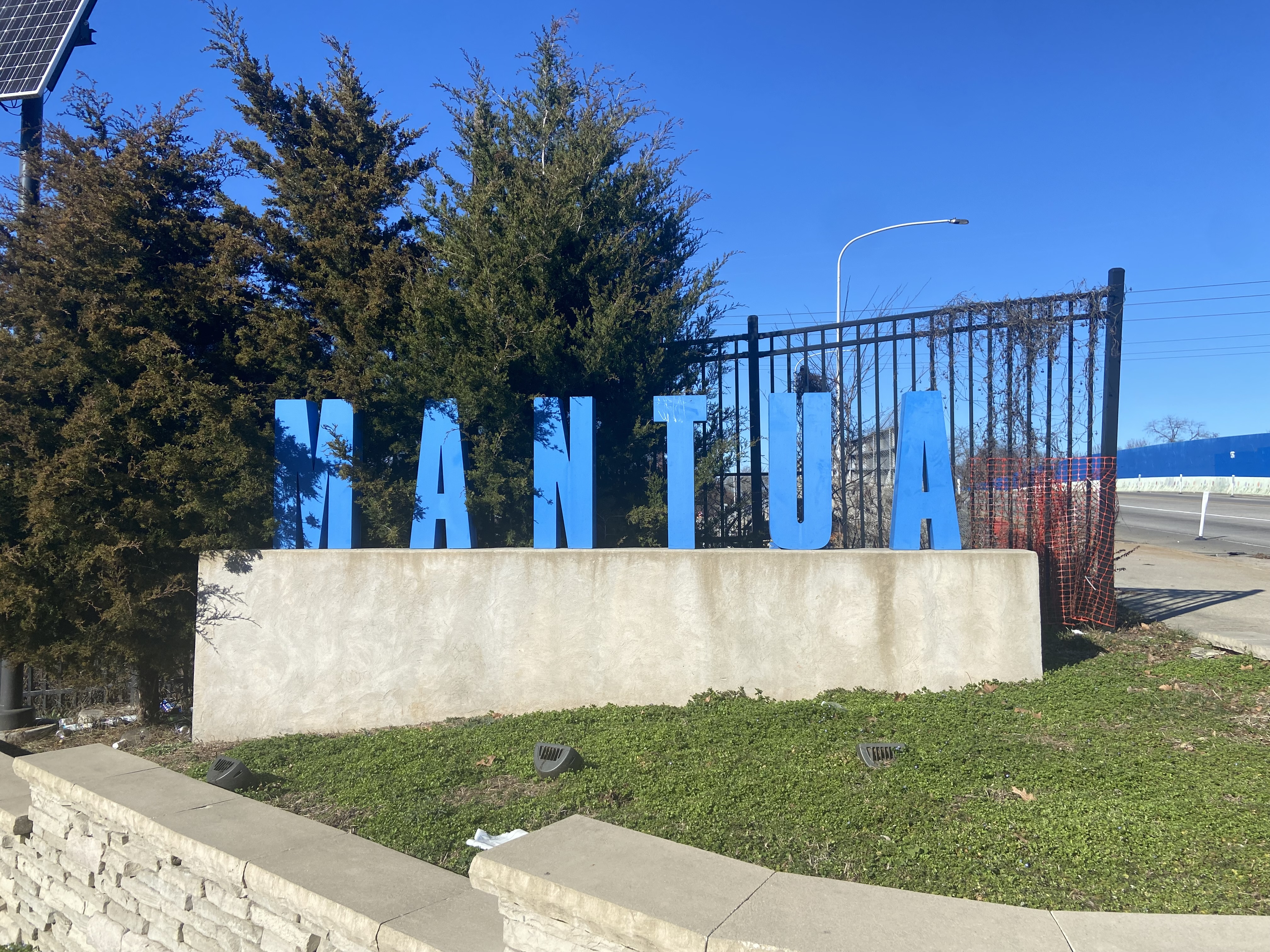
- Town sign at N 34th St. and Mantua Ave.

- Location within Philadelphia
- Country: United States
- State: Pennsylvania
- County: Philadelphia
- City: Philadelphia
- ZIP Code: 19104
- Area codes: 215, 267, and 445

Mantua is a neighborhood in the West Philadelphia section of Philadelphia, Pennsylvania. It is located north of Spring Garden Street, east of 40th Street, south of Mantua Avenue, and west of 31st Street. The neighborhood's northern and western reaches are predominantly working-class and African American, although its southern border with Powelton Village has seen recent gentrification and an influx of Drexel University and University of Pennsylvania student renters.

== History ==
Part of this neighborhood was purchased from the Lenape Indian tribe in 1677 by William Warner. In 1692, a young Welsh carpenter, William Powel, opened a ferry over the Schuylkill River at the foot of the present Spring Garden Bridge. Lancaster Pike and Haverford Road were the first routes providing access from the west.

=== 19th century ===
Mantua was named in 1809 by Judge Richard Peters, who designed a grid of lots with 36th St. and Haverford Ave. as the center. It was named after the city of Mantua in Italy.

Powelton Village, the neighborhood just south of Mantua, was named for the family of William Powell, whose son purchased additional land. By the mid-1880s, Powelton Village was a fashionable area, becoming part of Philadelphia after the Consolidation Act of 1854.

=== 20th century ===
Prior to the 1940s, Mantua was a predominantly white, Lutheran neighborhood. However, these decades mark the time when Black families began moving into the area’s boundaries. During the 1950s the area hosted a bustling commercial district on Haverford Avenue.

In the 1960s, six major Philadelphia gangs maintained a major presence in a 10.5 block area of Mantua. Between 1960 and 1969, Mantua recorded about 10% of total city gang killings. Mantua became one of the worst areas of the 16th precinct, and the Philadelphia Police Department often assigned patrols in Mantua to officers as punishment.

Andrew Jenkins and the Mantua Community Planners began working with the city to build a recreation center in Mantua. However, gang violence continuously delayed these efforts. The neighborhood’s first recreation center finally opened on what is now 34th Street and Haverford Avenue. In addition to the playgrounds, ball courts, and offices featured at most recreation centers, this one also housed a free library, and holding a library card was a requirement for entrance to the play centers.

Despite the crime, Wrice's Young Great Society and Jenkins' Mantua Community Planners fought to incorporate urban renewal programs, such as the planting of trees and building of housing units. Mt. Vernon Manor, a collection of apartment buildings, was once such development project.

Designed as part of the multipurpose Mantua Community Center, the Mantua library branch opened July 9, 1979. The building also includes a Department of Recreation gymnasium, a community office, and a meeting room.

Like many industrialized cities in the 1980s, Philadelphia saw a rise of drug-related gang warfare. The use of crack cocaine, combined with the existing heroin market, caused many residents to flee.

Although the drug trade began winding down in the 1990s, the community was feeling its lasting effects. The number of residents in the community fluttered around 6,000 most of the decade, and several hundred vacant lots dotted the streets. The movie theaters, retail outlets, and galleries that resided in Mantua during the 1950s were replaced by small delis and grab-and-go beer stores.

In the late 1990s, many of the abandoned lots and buildings were bought, renovated, and put on the market for rent. The neighborhood saw an influx of college students from Drexel University, among other institutions, move into the area in search of affordable housing.

In 1995, the Mantua library branch was renamed in honor of Charles L. Durham. Born in Mantua, Durham served on City Council from 1967 to 1974, and was appointed to the Common Pleas Court. He was a strong advocate for the community, and was deeply involved in the struggle for civil rights and was part of the first Black caucus on Council. The library was renovated four years later, in 1999, as part of the Free Library of Philadelphia "Changing Lives" campaign, which refurbished branches and ensured each branch had adequate Internet access.

=== 21st century ===
It is estimated that between 500 and 1000 college-aged students are living in Mantua. This growing number of students has brought renewed interest to the Mantua community from the expanding university system to the south, consisting mainly of Drexel University and the University of Pennsylvania.

== See also ==
- Spiral Q Puppet Theater
