= Telephone Exchange Building =

Telephone Exchange Building may refer to:

- Telephone Exchange Building (Powhatan, Arkansas), listed on the National Register of Historic Places in Lawrence County, Arkansas
- Telephone Exchange Building (Norwich, Connecticut), listed on the National Register of Historic Places in New London County, Connecticut

== See also ==
- List of telephone company buildings
- Telephone Company Building (disambiguation)
