= Powelton Village, Philadelphia =

National Historic District

- Powelton Historic District
- U.S. National Register of Historic Places
- U.S. Historic district
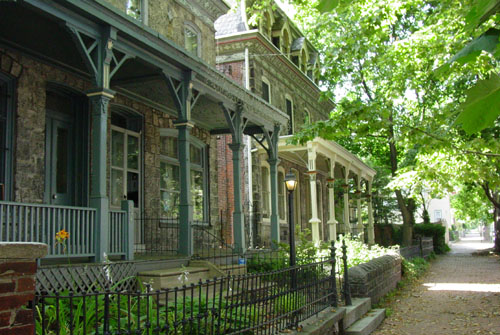
- Houses in Powelton Village

- Location within Philadelphia Location within Pennsylvania Location within the United States
- Location: 3500-3520 Powelton Ave., 214-218 35th St., and 215-221 36th St., Philadelphia, Pennsylvania
- Coordinates: 39°57′35″N 75°11′25″W
- Area: 105 acres (42 ha)
- Built: 1902
- Architect: Multiple
- NRHP reference No.: 85000998
- Added to NRHP: May 9, 1985

Powelton Village is a neighborhood in the West Philadelphia section of Philadelphia, Pennsylvania. It consists of mostly Victorian and twin style homes. It is a national historic district that is part of University City. Powelton Village extends north from Market Street to Spring Garden Street, east to 32nd Street, west to 40th and Spring Garden Streets, and to 44th and Market Streets.

== History ==
Powelton Village takes its name from mayor of Philadelphia Samuel Powel. In the late 1800s, trolley lines opened the area up to urbanization. Powelton soon became a choice residential spot for Philadelphia industrial tycoons.

Powelton's luster began to wane by the 1920s, and by the 1940s the neighborhood was populated by low-income families. In the 1960s the Village was home to many members of the counterculture movement, and Powelton today has a strong political activism and anarchist tradition, as well as multiethnic pluralism.

In addition to the Powelton Historic District, the Bell Telephone Exchange Building, The Powelton, Frederick A. Poth Houses, and John Shedwick Development Houses are listed on the National Register of Historic Places.

== Arts and culture ==
Spiral Q Puppet Theater is located on Spring Garden Street between 31st and 32nd Streets.
