= Downtown Norwich Historic District =

Historic district in Connecticut, United States

- U.S. National Register of Historic Places
- U.S. Historic district
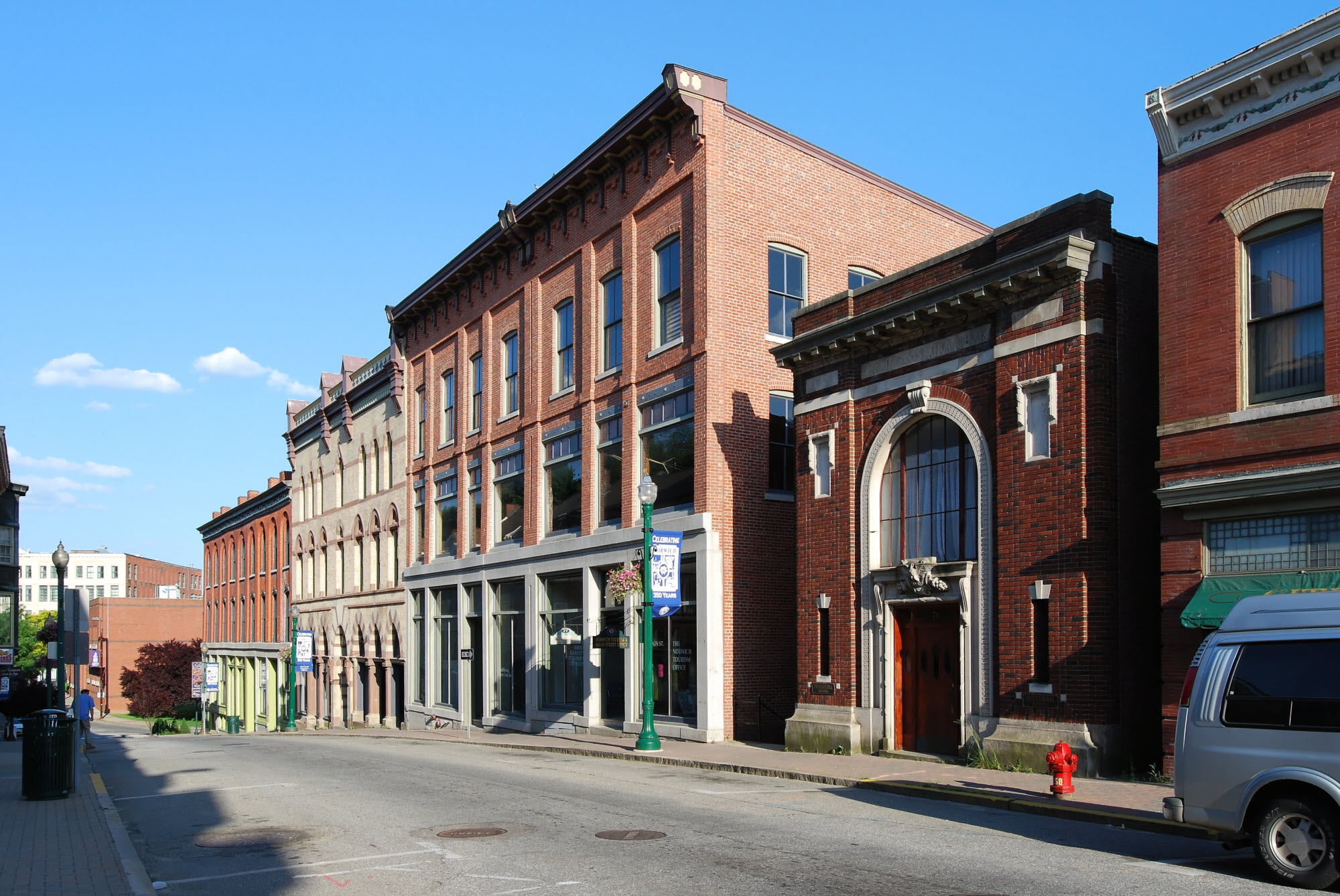

- Location within Connecticut Location within the United States
- Location: Roughly bounded by Union Square, Park, Main and Shetland Streets, and Washington Square, Norwich, Connecticut, United States
- Coordinates: 41°31′26″N 72°4′38″W
- Area: 64 acres (26 ha)
- Architect: Evan Burdick and others
- Architectural style: Late 19th and 20th Century Revivals, Greek Revival, Late Victorian
- NRHP reference No.: 85000707
- Added to NRHP: April 4, 1985

The Downtown Norwich Historic District is a historic district representing the core of the downtown area of the city of Norwich, Connecticut in the United States. It was listed on the National Register of Historic Places in 1985. It includes 115 contributing buildings and one other contributing structure over a 64-acre (26 ha) area. Several buildings in the historic district are also individually listed on the National Register, including the Norwich Town Hall, the Telephone Exchange Building and the Carroll Building.

Norwich was settled by English colonists in the 17th century, and its first wharf was built in 1684. It developed rapidly as a shipping port, with economic activity focused near the waterfront at the confluence of the Shetucket, Yantic, and Thames Rivers. The downtown developed as a linear area just north of the main port area, Main Street forming an east–west axis. The oldest surviving commercial building dates to 1742, and the oldest house to 1745. A major fire in the downtown in 1793 encouraged a shift to brick construction, but growth was squelched by the economic blockades associated with the War of 1812. The downtown's architecture is consequently dominated by Greek Revival and late 19th and early 20th century architecture, which was built when the city was an important point for the transshipment of goods by either rail or ship. By this time, the city's economy had diversified to include banking, textiles, and other water-powered industry. The downtown area includes many intact 18th and 19th-century buildings centered on the now-picturesque harbor.

== See also ==
- Neighborhoods of Norwich, Connecticut
- National Register of Historic Places listings in New London County, Connecticut
