= Bell Telephone (disambiguation) =

Bell Telephone refers to the Bell System of companies, led by the Bell Telephone Company and later by AT&T, which provided telephone services to much of the United States and Canada from 1877 to 1984.

Bell Telephone may also refer to:

- Bell Telephone Company, several telephone companies with similar names
- Bell Telephone Building (disambiguation), various
- The Bell Telephone Hour, a long-running radio and television concert program
- A hypothetical device named after physicist John Stewart Bell which allows signals to be sent faster than the speed of light using quantum mechanics.

== See also ==
- Bell Telephone Memorial
