= Carroll Building (Norwich, Connecticut) =

- U.S. National Register of Historic Places
- U.S. Historic district – Contributing property
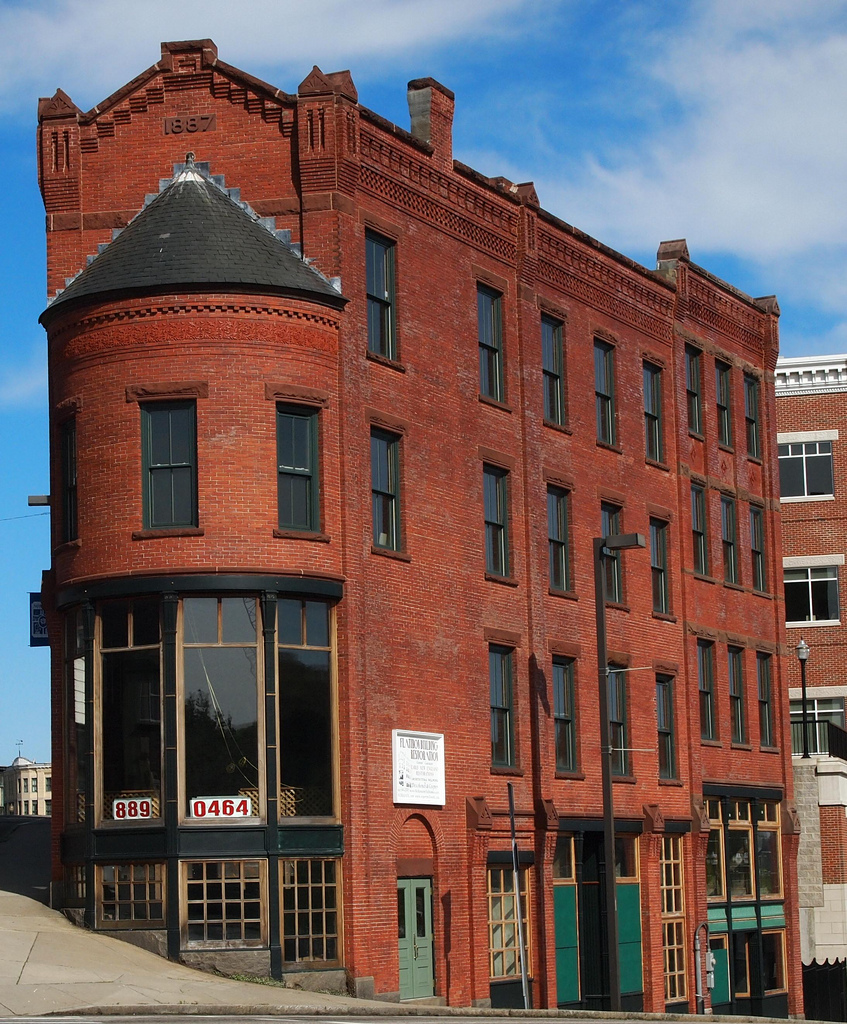

- Location within Connecticut Location within the United States
- Interactive map of Carroll Building
- Location: 9-15 Main Street, and 14-20 Water Street, Norwich, Connecticut
- Coordinates: 41°31′27.6″N 72°4′46.6″W
- Area: 0.1 acres (0.040 ha)
- Built: 1887
- Architect: Stephen C. Earle
- Architectural style: Romanesque
- Part of: Downtown Norwich Historic District (ID85000707)
- NRHP reference No.: 82001007

Significant dates
- Added to NRHP: November 14, 1982
- Designated CP: January 17, 1973

The Carroll Building in Norwich, Connecticut, also known as the Flat Iron Building, was built in 1887. It was listed on the National Register of Historic Places (NRHP) in 1982. It is included in the Downtown Norwich Historic District, which is also listed on the NRHP. It was originally used as offices and retail stores, but it is now used primarily as an apartment building. It is located on a triangular tract created by the intersection of Main and Water Streets. The building is highly visible from Washington Square (West Side of Downtown) and is one of the most noticeable aspects of the Downtown Streetscape.

== Background ==
The Carroll Building was commissioned by Lucius W. Carroll, a merchant with investments that included a textile mill, and designed by Stephen C. Earle of Worcester, Massachusetts. It bore resemblance to the Salisbury Building, constructed a year earlier, but it was more refined. (Note: The Salisbury Building has been demolished. Two later constructions in 1879 and 1882 were placed on the register in 1980 as the Salisbury Factory Buildings. Records indicate that this building is no longer standing.) Various businesses leased spaces in the building, including Southern New England Telephone between 1894 and 1902. The prominent location of the building and its visual impact made the Carroll Building an excellent example of downtown Norwich architecture.

== Design ==
The Carroll Building was built in 1887 on a triangular plot at the intersection of Main Street and Water Street in downtown Norwich. This intersection has different grades which brought unique requirements to the design. The site has an upward incline on the north-to-south axis and slopes downward on the east-to-west axis on Main Street; it inclines upward on Water Street. Consequently, the building varies between four and five stories tall. An 18-foot (5.5 m) semicircular turret projects outward at the intersection of the site.

== Modern use ==
In the late 1980s, Norwich passed an ordinance on property owners which stipulated that properties "shall reflect a level of maintenance in keeping with the standards of the community and not constitute a blighting factor for adjoining property owners." This meant that the owners of the Carroll Building had to make improvements to the visual appearance of the building or face fines. The building was also part of the Society of the Founders of Norwich Inc.'s "Walking Through History" guide. In 1992, the Connecticut Trust For Historic Preservation placed the Carroll Building at the top of their list of the most important historic sites that were endangered.

== Importance ==
The Carroll Building is an excellent example of commercial Romanesque Revival architecture in Norwich. Earle's successful design fitting the building to the eccentricities of the intersection of the two streets is part of what makes the landmark important. The design adjusts to the constricted and different inclines of the site by connecting what is essentially two separate buildings through a common staircase, and by utilizing the differences in grade for storefront use. The Carroll Building is also historically significant because it is representative of the real estate practice in the city in the late 19th-century and the wealth and influence of Carroll. Carroll rented the property as a realty investment rather than using the office space himself in the same way that other prominent buildings in downtown Norwich were constructed. The building is also situated in a prominent position when viewed from Washington Square and is a notable aspect of the downtown landscape.

== See also ==
- National Register of Historic Places listings in New London County, Connecticut
- List of buildings named Flatiron Building
