= Frederick A. Poth Houses =

- U.S. National Register of Historic Places
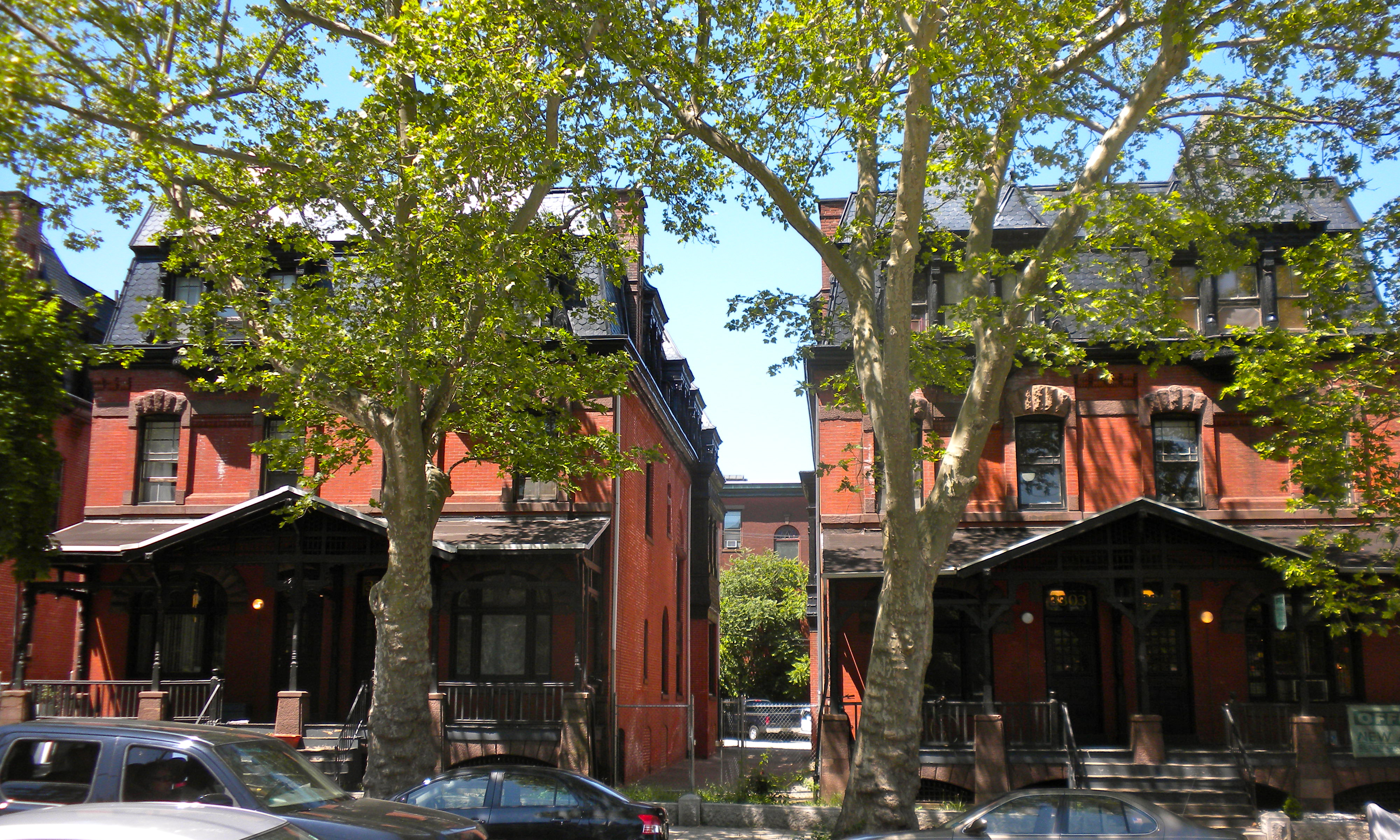
- Frederick A. Poth Houses, May 2010

- Location within Philadelphia Location within Pennsylvania Location within the United States
- Location: 15, 3301–3311 Powelton Ave., Philadelphia, Pennsylvania
- Coordinates: 39°57′37″N 75°11′25″W
- Area: 0.6 acres (0.24 ha)
- Built: 1890
- Architect: Otto Wolf
- Architectural style: German Gothic
- NRHP reference No.: 79002327
- Added to NRHP: April 19, 1979

Frederick A. Poth Houses is a set of four historic homes located in the Powelton Village neighborhood of Philadelphia, Pennsylvania. They were built in 1890, and consist of three double houses and a half double. The buildings are built of brick, with limestone trim and mansard roofs in the German Gothic-style. They feature elaborately decorated dormers, balcony-like projections, and spidery porches.

They were added to the National Register of Historic Places in 1979.

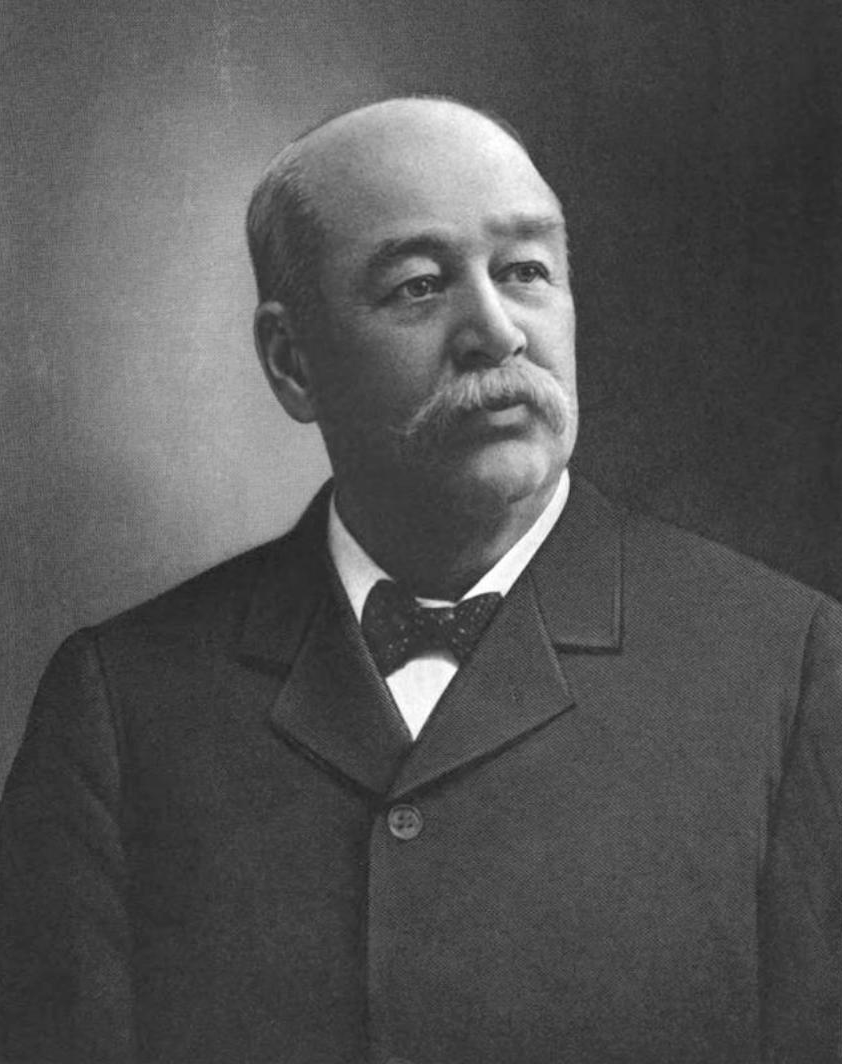
German-American brewer Frederick August Poth (1840–1905)
