= Herman Wrice =

American activist (1939–2000)

Herman Wrice during a talk show about drugs in Philadelphia (c.1989-1999)

Herman Wrice (1939–2000) was a renowned community organizer in Philadelphia, Pennsylvania and inventor of the Wrice Process method of direct action, whereby neighbors directly confront street-level drug dealers in their communities.

In 1988, Herman organized Mantua Against Drugs (MAD). In a white hard-hat, provided by Mayor Wilson Goode, Herman began the demolition of crack houses and led marches against drug dealers who operated freely on street corners in Mantua. He often faced death threats. Once, he fearlessly taunted drug dealers to follow up on their threats while he worked cleaning a street park. He put up "Wanted" posters with pictures of the Dealer of the Week. Herman's methods were adopted by other communities in Philadelphia. His message: "Stand up to them and they’ll leave."

Philadelphia police took notice and began helping Herman. Soon communities saw that the police were there to help get rid of dealers. Herman observed, "Communities [had] thought the police were the enemy — and the dealers loved it."
