= Taking Care of Business =

Taking Care of Business may refer to:

- "Takin' Care of Business" (song), a 1974 song by Canadian rock band Bachman–Turner Overdrive
- Taking Care of Business (film), a 1990 American comedy film
- Takin' Care of Business (Charlie Rouse album), a 1960 album by American jazz saxophonist Charlie Rouse
- Taking Care of Business (Oliver Nelson album), a 1960 album by American jazz saxophonist Oliver Nelson
- Taking Care of Business, a 1970 album by American blues singer and musician James Cotton
- Taking Care of Business, a 1995 album by English pop punk band Senseless Things
- Takin' Care of Business, a 1998 compilation album by Bachman–Turner Overdrive

== See also ==
- TCB (album), a 2010 album by James Reyne, abbreviation for Taking Care of Business
- TCB (TV program), a 1968 Motown television special and its respective album, abbreviation for Taking Care of Business
- TCB (disambiguation)
