= Bell Building =

Bell Building may refer to:

- Bell Building (Montgomery Alabama), listed on the National Register of Historic Places
- Old Republic Building, Chicago, Illinois, a Chicago landmark originally known as the "Bell Building"
- Indiana Bell Building

== See also ==
- Bell Telephone Building (disambiguation)
