= John Shedwick Development Houses =

Historic houses in Pennsylvania, United States

- U.S. National Register of Historic Places
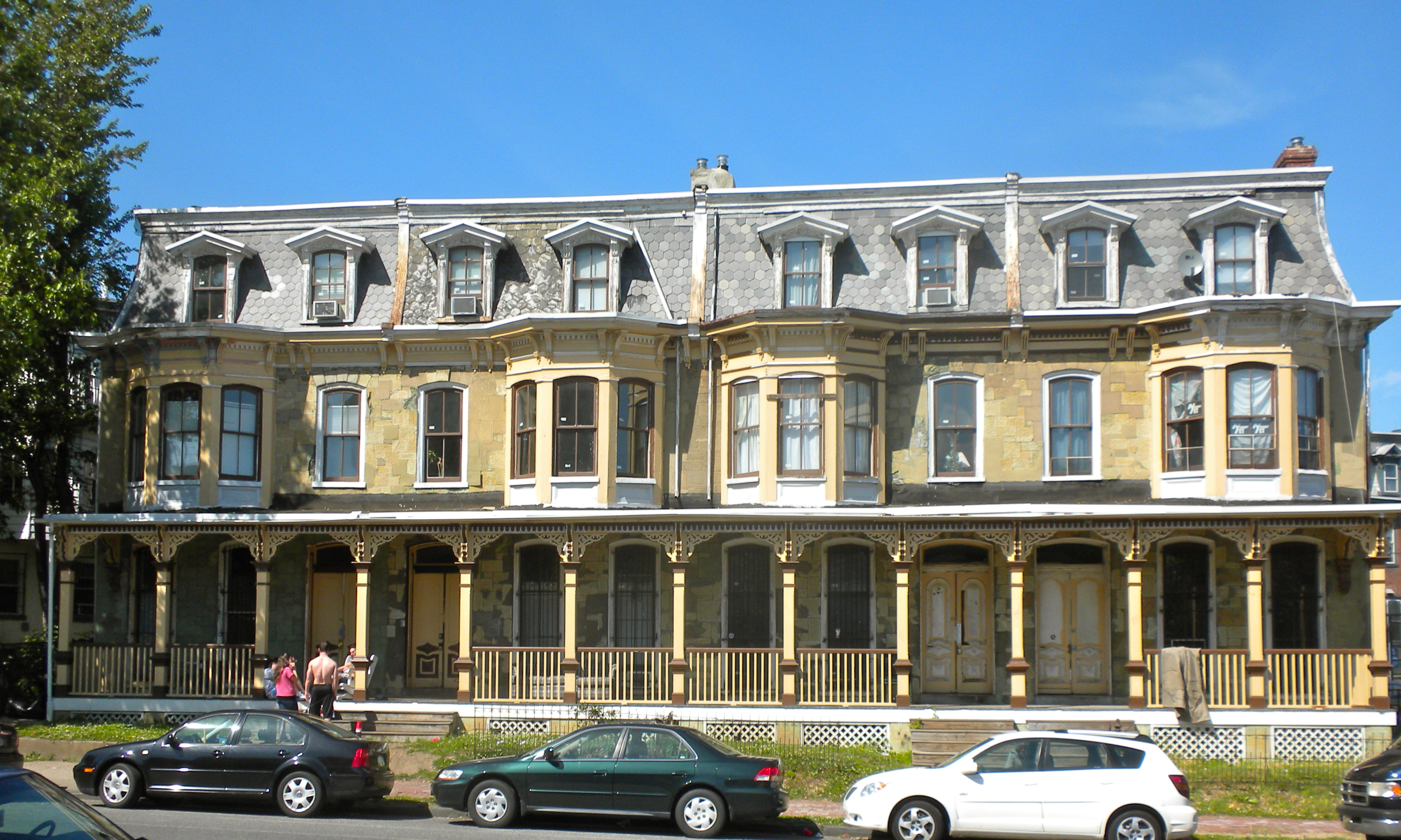
- John Shedwick Development Houses, May 2010

- Location within Philadelphia Location within Pennsylvania Location within the United States
- Location: 3433-3439 Lancaster Ave., Philadelphia, Pennsylvania
- Coordinates: 39°57′27″N 75°10′48″W
- Area: 0.5 acres (0.20 ha)
- Built: 1875
- Architectural style: Second Empire
- NRHP reference No.: 82003814
- Added to NRHP: March 10, 1982

The John Shedwick Development Houses (also known as the Lancastle) is a set of four historic rowhouses that are located in the Powelton Village neighborhood of Philadelphia, Pennsylvania.

These structures were added to the National Register of Historic Places in 1982.

== History and architectural features ==
Built between 1875 and 1876, these historic structures are made of brick, and have green serpentine facing. Designed in the Second Empire style, they feature wooden first-floor porches, projecting bay windows, and mansard roofs with dormers.
