= TCB =

TCB may refer to:

== Companies and organizations ==
- Taiwan Cooperative Bank, a bank of Taiwan
- The Conference Board, a non-profit business membership and research group organization in New York City
- Touring Club Belgium, a motoring organization in Belgium
- Transportes Charter do Brasil, a cargo airline in São Paulo, Brazil

== Computing ==
- Task Control Block, an instance of a process control block within IBM OS/360 and successor systems
- Thread control block, a data structure in the operating system kernel
- Trusted computing base, a set of computer components critical to its security
- Temenos Core Banking, banking software from Temenos Group
- Transmission Control Block, a data structure used by a Transmission Control Protocol stack

== Music ==
- TCB (album), James Reyne's album of Elvis Presley cover songs
- TCB (band), an early 1970s Canadian rock group
- TCB Band, rhythm section of Elvis Presley's band

== Science ==
- TCB-2, a hallucinogenic phenethylamine compound
- Trichlorobenzene, an organic chemical
- Temps-Coordonnée Barycentrique (Barycentric Coordinate Time), a coordinate time standard in astronomy
- TCB meter (transcutaneous bilirubin meter), a device which measures bilirubin level

== Other ==
- TCB (TV program), 1968 Motown television special and album
- TCB, IATA code for Treasure Cay Airport in The Bahamas
- TCB, NYSE symbol for TCF Financial Corporation
- TCB, Ordnance Survey map code for a telephone call box
- TCB spline ("tension, continuity, and bias"), in mathematics, another term for a Kochanek–Bartels spline
- Telecommunication Certification Body, compliance agency re Federal Communications Commission (FCC) rules and regulations
- Track circuit block, name used in the United Kingdom for automatic block signalling on railways

== See also ==
- Taking Care of Business (disambiguation)
- Telephone Company Building (disambiguation)
