= Interior Telephone Company Building =

- U.S. National Register of Historic Places
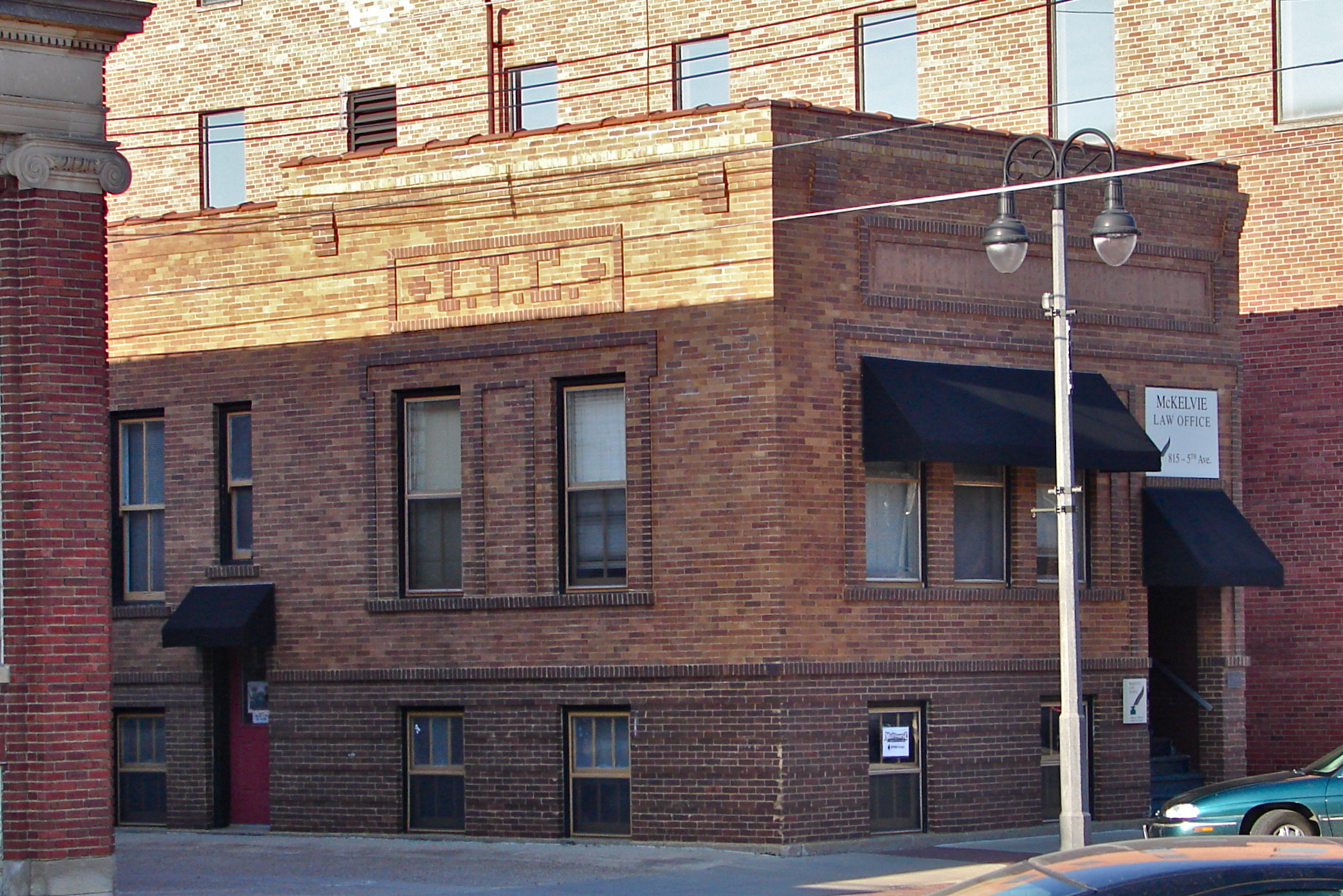

- Location within Iowa Location within the United States
- Location: 815 5th Ave. Grinnell, Iowa
- Coordinates: 41°44′41″N 92°43′29″W
- Area: less than one acre
- Built: 1912
- MPS: Grinnell MPS
- NRHP reference No.: 90001850
- Added to NRHP: December 20, 1990

The Interior Telephone Company Building is a historic structure located in Grinnell, Iowa, United States. Iowa was one of the leading Midwest states to adopt the telephone as a means of communication. By 1920 86% of the state's farms had a telephone. The Interior Telephone Company was established to serve the Grinnell area. It was one of two companies to provide the service locally, and one of 500 independent telephone companies that provided local service and connected to the Bell System for long distance. Interior Telephone built this building to house its operations in 1912. It is a one-story brick structure built over a raised basement. The telephone equipment was housed in the basement, and office space was located on the main floor. The building was built to stand apart from the surrounding buildings, perhaps as a means for fire protection. The company's initials, I.T.C., are part of the brickwork on both side of the building. It was listed on the National Register of Historic Places in 1990.
