= Swedish American Telephone Company Building =

- U.S. National Register of Historic Places
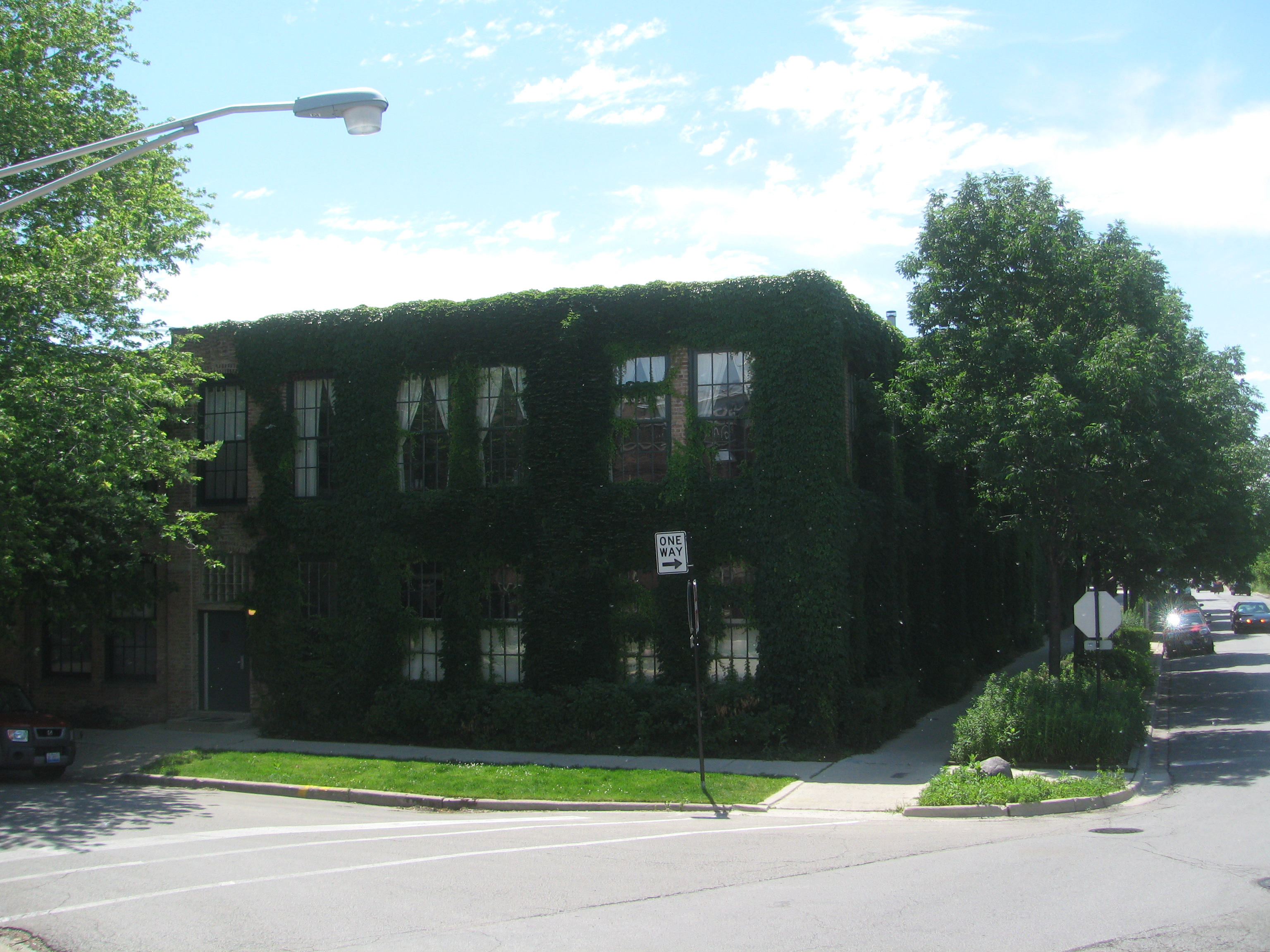

- Location within Chicago metropolitan area
- Location: 5235--5257 N. Ravenswood, Chicago, Illinois
- Coordinates: 41°58′39″N 87°40′27″W
- Area: 0.5 acres (0.20 ha)
- Built: 1895; 131 years ago
- NRHP reference No.: 85002286
- Added to NRHP: September 13, 1985

The Swedish American Telephone Company Building is a historic structure in the Edgewater neighborhood of Chicago. Built in the later 1890s, the factory differs from other industrial buildings of its day because of its ornate facade. It was home to medical supplier Betz & Co. (1895–1905), the Swedish American Telephone Company (1905–1923), and the Denoyer-Geppert Co. (1923–1985).

== History ==
The Ravenswood Land Company purchased 194 acres (79 ha) along the Chicago & North Western tracks in Edgewater in 1868. At the time, the railroad had stops to the north at Rosehill Cemetery and to the south at Ravenswood Manor. In 1875, the railroad opened a stop at Summerdale, 100 feet (30 m) west of this site. Plans were in place to develop a residential community there by 1890. The neighborhood became known as Andersenville by its early Norwegian settlers—later Swedish settlers changed the name to Andersonville, and the Summerdale name fell into disuse. The Swedish American Telephone Company Building was the first major industrial building in the Andersonville district of Edgewater. A sizable employer, the factory building spurred residential growth in the surrounding area. It was the first building of what would become an industrial corridor along the CNW tracks.

The factory building housed three significant companies in succession. Frank Betz was a former real estate developer who lost his fortune in the Panic of 1893, but quickly recovered as a manufacturer of bath cabinets. In 1899, he decided to expand his operations to include other supplies for hospitals and physicians. This required a larger manufacturing space, so he built a three-story building here; it was attached to two existing buildings in 1901, creating the large complex that stands today. By 1904, Betz & Co. had outgrown the Andersonville factory and moved to Hammond, Indiana.

When the patent on telephones expired in 1894, the Swedish American Telephone Company was one of the many small operations founded to supply the industry. Swedish American sold most of their products to the Chicago Telephone Co., a monopoly in the area. In 1902, the company was sold to Stromberg-Carlson, which itself was sold to Eastern Industrialist the next year. By 1905, Swedish American required a larger building to manufacture its products and moved into the recently vacated Betz & Co. building.

The next tenant was the Denoyer-Geppert Company, who moved into the building in 1923. They were best known for their educational pull-down maps for classrooms. They also manufactured models of human features for medical schools and developed educational film strips. The company was purchased by Rand McNally in 1984. Shortly after they moved out, the building was recognized by the National Park Service with a listing on the National Register of Historic Places.
