= Chesapeake and Potomac Telephone Company, Old Main Building =

- U.S. National Register of Historic Places
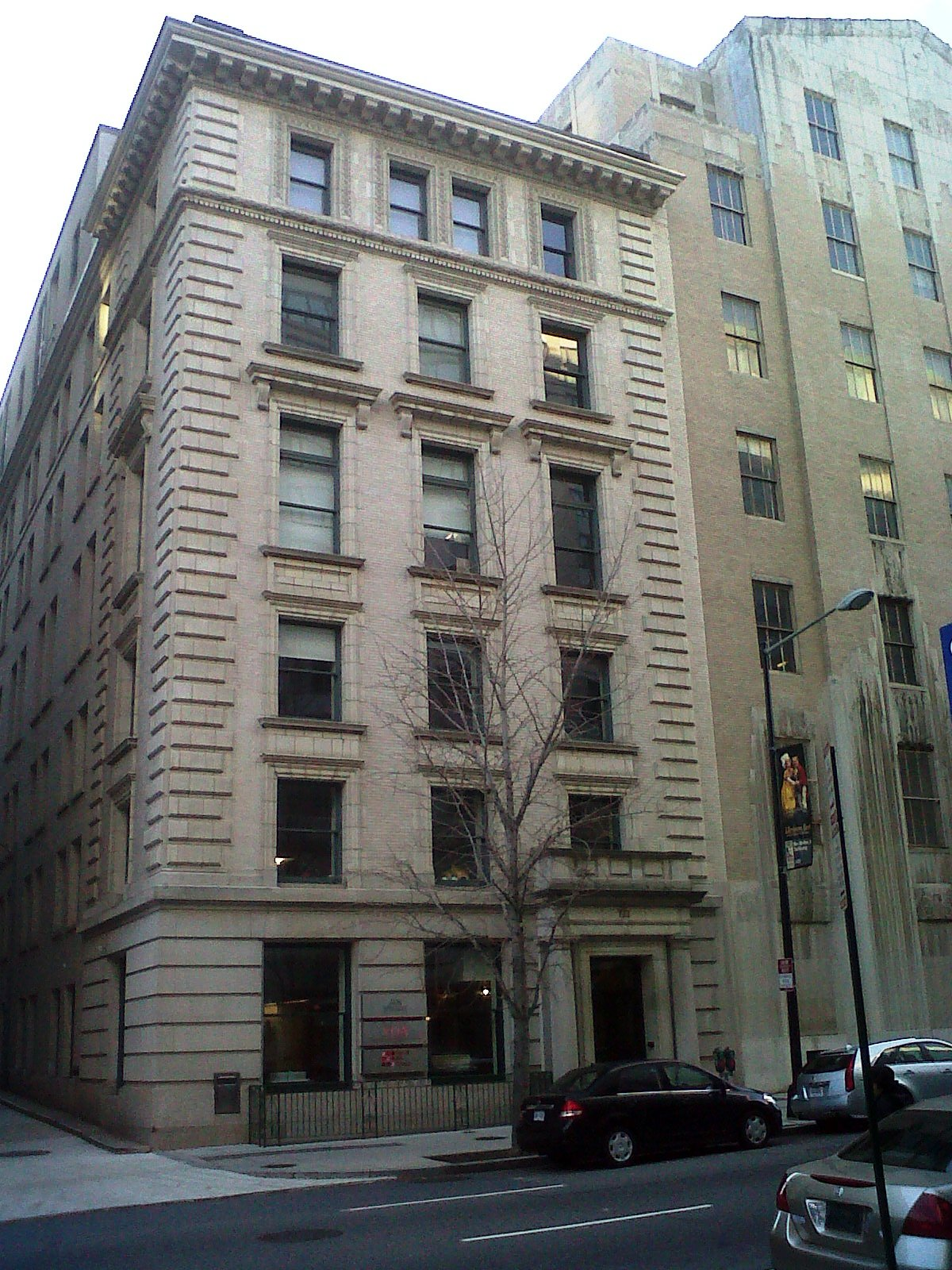
- Chesapeake and Potomac Telephone Company, Old Main Building in 2011

- Location within Washington, D.C.
- Location: 722 Twelfth St., NW; Washington, D.C.
- Coordinates: 38°53′56″N 77°1′42″W
- Built: 1903-1904
- Architect: Leon Eidlitz
- Architectural style: Late 19th and early 20th Century Revivals
- NRHP reference No.: 88000652
- Added to NRHP: June 13, 1988

The Chesapeake and Potomac Telephone Company, Old Main Building is a historic structure located in Downtown Washington, D.C. It was listed on the National Register of Historic Places in 1988.

== History ==
As the number of businesses in Washington increasingly relied on telephone service, Chesapeake and Potomac Telephone Company built this building as its new main exchange. Designed by architect Leon Eidlitz, it was the first of a complex of buildings the company would construct at this site. The building houses what was considered to be the largest telephone switchboard at the time. It began operations in September 1904 and served 6,000 at the beginning. The new system eliminated the multiple rings on party lines and the need for an operator to interrupt the line to determine whether a subscriber had completed a call or wanted to receive calls.

== See also ==
- Chesapeake and Potomac Telephone Company Building
- Chesapeake and Potomac Telephone Company Warehouse and Repair Facility
