= New England Telephone Building =

- U.S. National Register of Historic Places
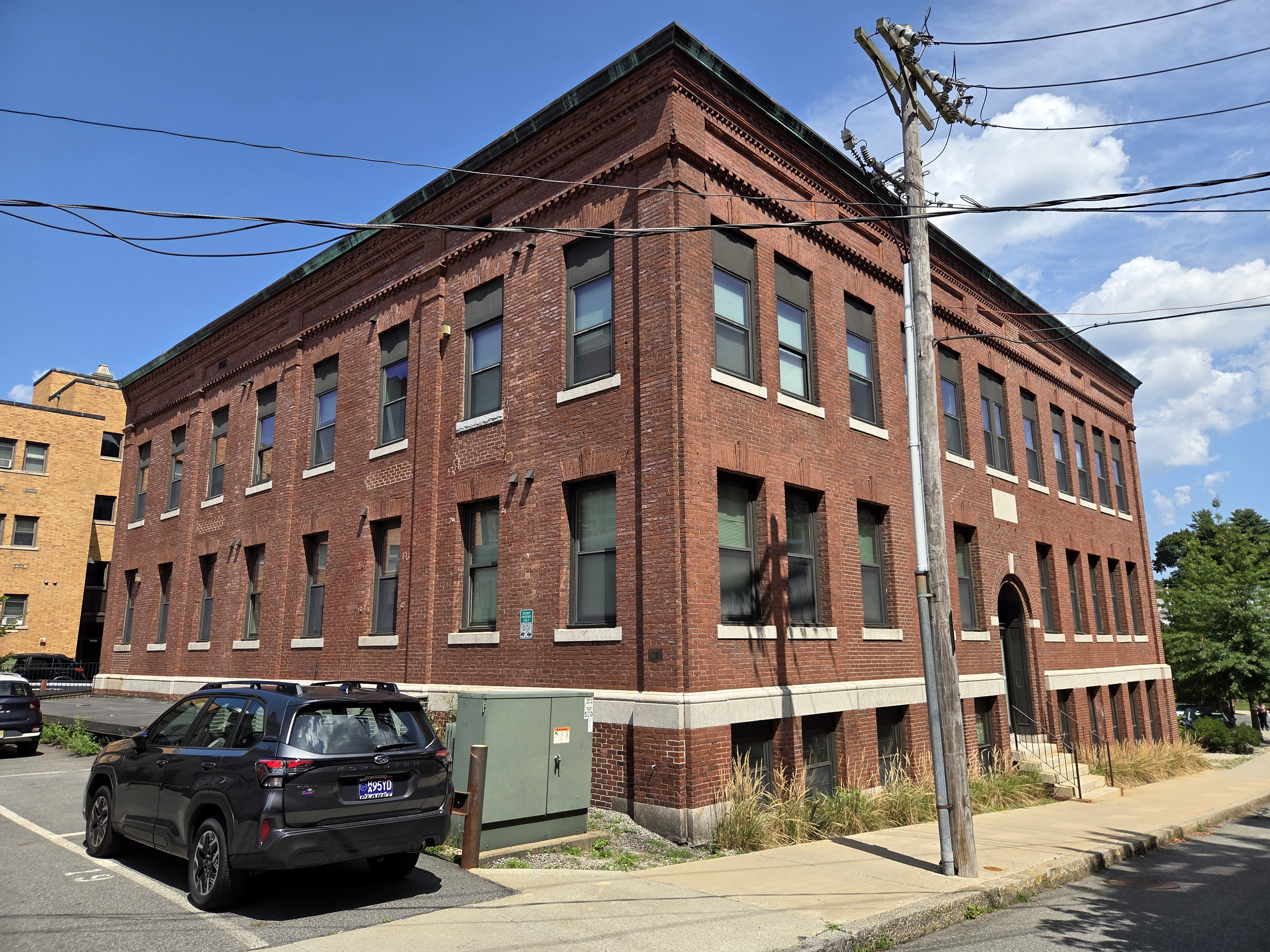
- New England Telephone Building in 2026

- Location within Massachusetts Location within the United States
- Location: 10 Merrymount Road, Quincy, Massachusetts
- Coordinates: 42°15′23.3″N 71°0′24.4″W
- Area: 0.1 acres (0.040 ha)
- Built: c. 1906
- Architectural style: Classical Revival
- MPS: Quincy MRA
- NRHP reference No.: 89001357
- Added to NRHP: September 20, 1989

The New England Telephone Building is a historic utility building at 10 Merrymount Road in Quincy, Massachusetts. This two-story Classical Revival brick structure was built c. 1906 and doubled in size in 1924, reaching its present proportions. It housed the telephone exchange of the New England Telephone Company until 1940, after which time it was converted to office space.

The building was listed on the National Register of Historic Places in 1989.

== See also ==
- National Register of Historic Places listings in Quincy, Massachusetts
