= Spiral Q Puppet Theater =

Puppet troupe based in Philadelphia, Pennsylvania

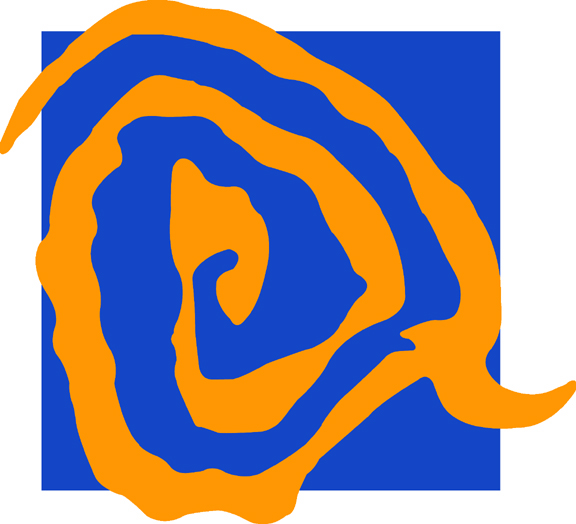
- Company type: Nonprofit
- Founded: 1999
- Headquarters: 3114 Spring Garden St., Philadelphia, Pennsylvania, United States
- Key people: Tracy Broyles, Executive Director; Christina Cantrill, President
- Number of employees: Approx. 25
- Website: Official Site

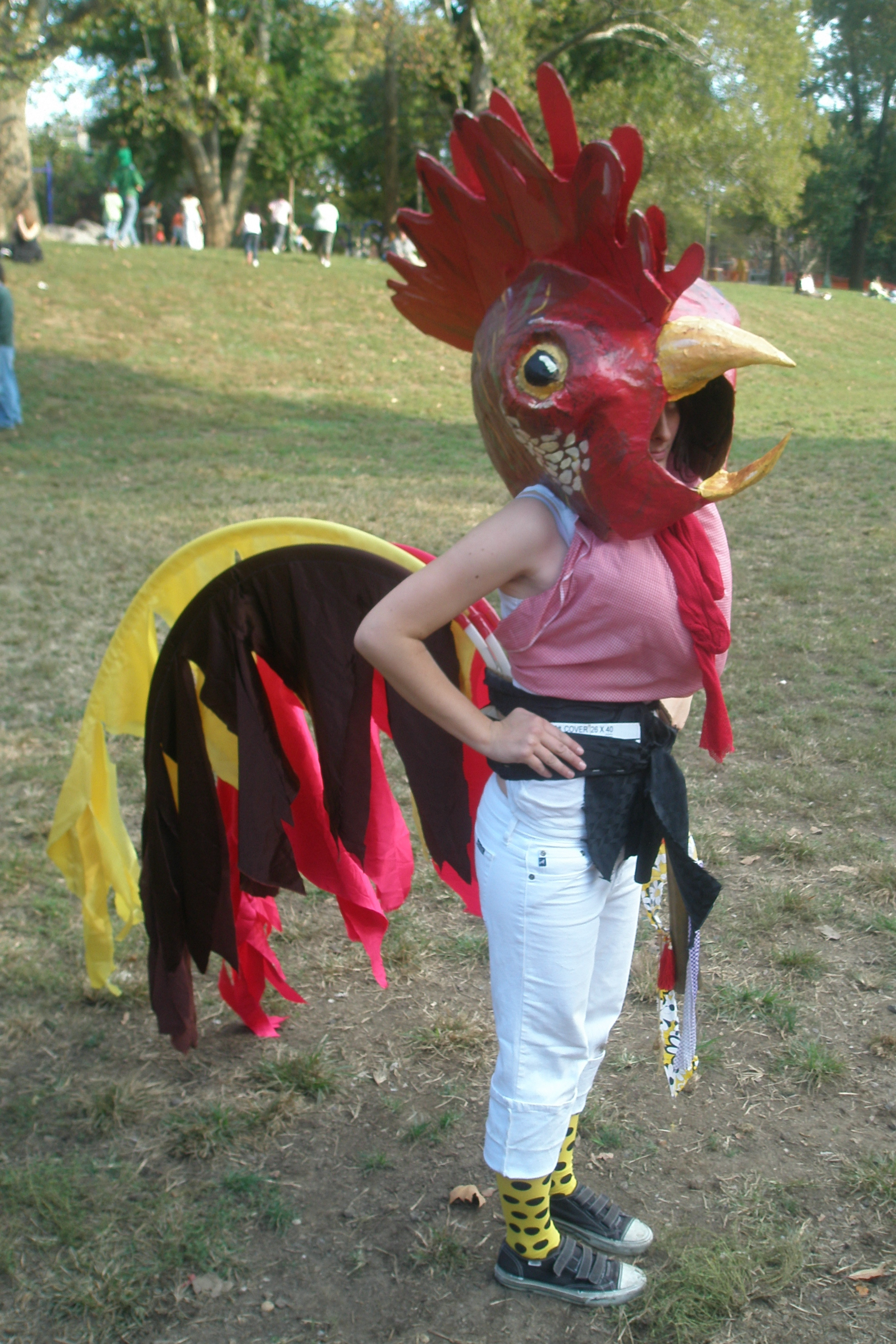
Spiral Q performer in the 2007 Peoplehood Pageant

Spiral Q Puppet Theater is a puppet troupe founded in 1995 by Matthew "Mattyboy" Hart in Philadelphia, Pennsylvania. After traveling the country, Hart was inspired by the street performance work of the Radical Faeries and the Bread and Puppet Theater in Glover, Vermont. On his return to Philadelphia, Hart founded Spiral Q as a way to use his new interest in puppetry, street theatre and pageantry to promote social and political change.

== History ==
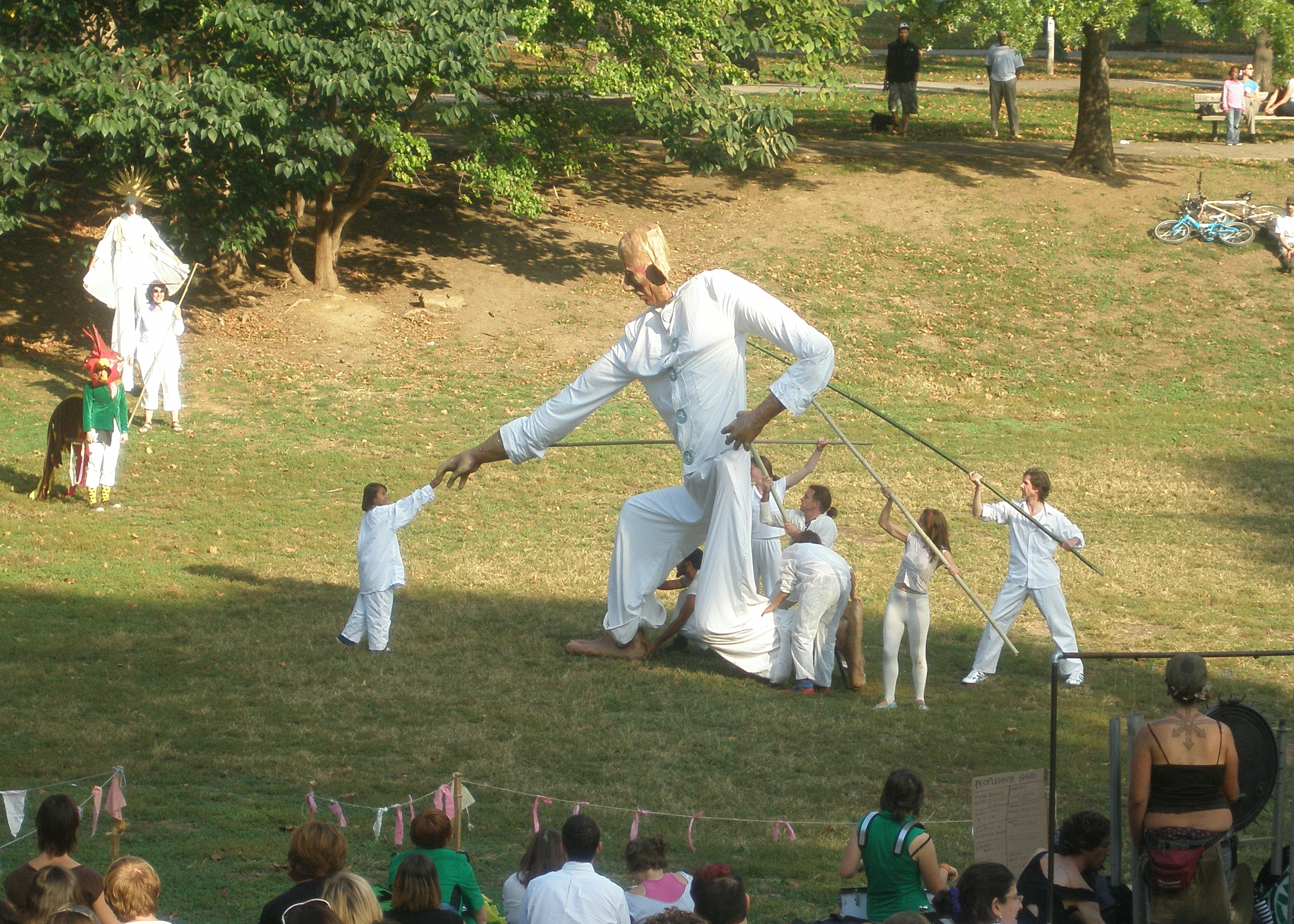
"The Sleeping Giant" from Spiral Q's 2007 Peoplehood Pageant

Initially, Spiral Q was a shadow puppet theater that staged performances throughout the community. Local activist groups came to Hart to make puppets, props and effigies for demonstrations and educational campaigns. Spiral Q's identity springs from this early work in Philadelphia's HIV/AIDS activist and queer communities, particularly with AIDS Coalition To Unleash Power (ACT UP). In 1997 and 1998, Hart organized the week-long Full-On Puppet Festival in Philadelphia, showcasing puppeteers from around the country. Spiral Q also organized an annual Day of the Dead parade on South Street up through 1999. Both the festival and the parade were set aside so that the organization could focus on community activism.

Workshops with a local children's garden led to another model of community performance with children and adults carrying giant puppets that they created in parades and pageants. Spiral Q started an annual citywide parade and pageant, started in 1996 as "the Day of the Dead: Celebration and Parade", and renamed "Peoplehood: An All City Parade and Pageant" in 2000. Each October, the parade starts at the Paul Robeson House and ends in Clark Park. In addition to neighborhood parades and pageants such as Peoplehood, Spiral Q also has its Justice Works Program and Education Initiatives.

Since 2000, the theater has been located in the East Mantua section of West Philadelphia. Hart left the company in 2003 to pursue other interests.

== See also ==
- Medieval pageant
- In the Heart of the Beast Puppet and Mask Theatre
- Superior Concept Monsters
