= Norwich City Hall (Connecticut) =

- U.S. National Register of Historic Places
- U.S. Historic district – Contributing property
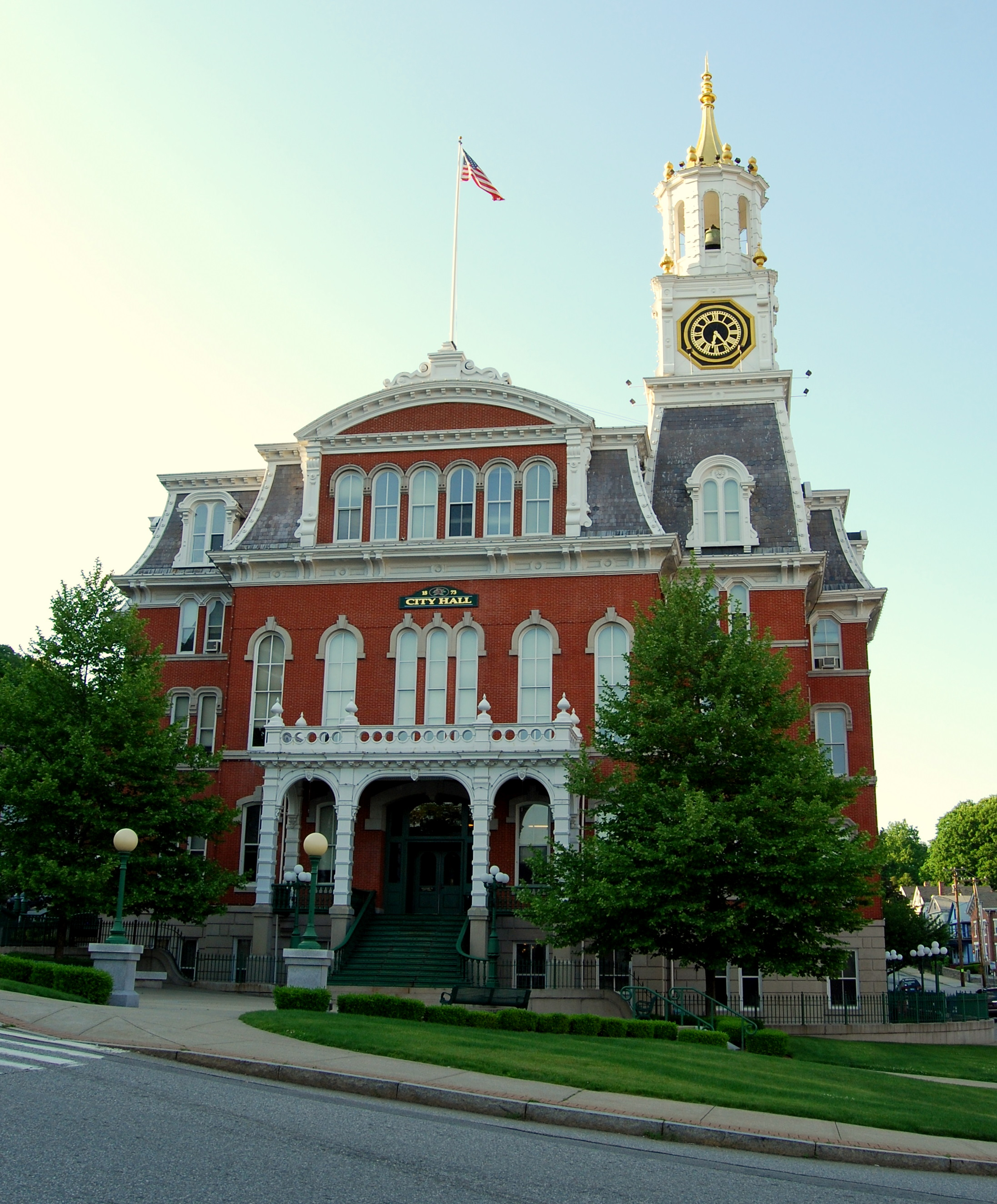

- Location within Connecticut Location within the United States
- Location: Union Street and Broadway, Norwich, Connecticut
- Coordinates: 41°31′35″N 72°04′34″W
- Area: 1 acre (0.40 ha)
- Built: 1870
- Architect: Burdick & Arnold
- Architectural style: Second Empire
- Part of: Downtown Norwich Historic District (ID85000707)
- NRHP reference No.: 83003589

Significant dates
- Added to NRHP: December 22, 1983
- Designated CP: April 4, 1985

Norwich City Hall is the seat of municipal government in Norwich, Connecticut, United States. It is located at Union Street and Broadway, prominently overlooking the city's central business district. Built in 1870-73, when Norwich was still a town, it has served as the seat of municipal government since then. Architecturally it is a prominent statewide example of civic Second Empire architecture, and was listed on the National Register of Historic Places in 1983 (as Norwich Town Hall) for its architecture and history.

== Description and history ==
Norwich City Hall is located in downtown Norwich, on a parcel bounded on the west by Union Street and on the east by Broadway. It overlooks Union Square, a major public space, and is flanked by other civic buildings, including two churches.

Its history dates to 1865 (before the city and town of Norwich were consolidated), when the town of Norwich petitioned the state for permission to construct a single building to house town offices, city offices and Norwich's county court, the latter having been housed in a building recently destroyed by fire. The state authorized the work in 1869. The Norwich architecture firm Burdick & Arnold designed the building (built 1870–1873), and the architects Cudworth & Woodworth built an addition (completed 1909), intended to provide more office space. The building continues to function in all of the roles for which it was originally designed, although the district court functions are now managed by the state.

City Hall is an exemplar of the Second Empire style, with a three-story brick facade set on a cut-stone basement, and a full fourth floor tucked under the slate mansard roof. The exterior is richly decorated with Second Empire detail, including a cast-iron entry porch, stone window surrounds and bracketed eaves. The corner tower's mansard-roofed stage is topped by a clock, a belfry, and a conical cap. The interior is embellished with elaborate wood carving and finishes.

== See also ==
- National Register of Historic Places listings in New London County, Connecticut
