= Chicago Telephone Company Kedzie Exchange =

- U.S. National Register of Historic Places
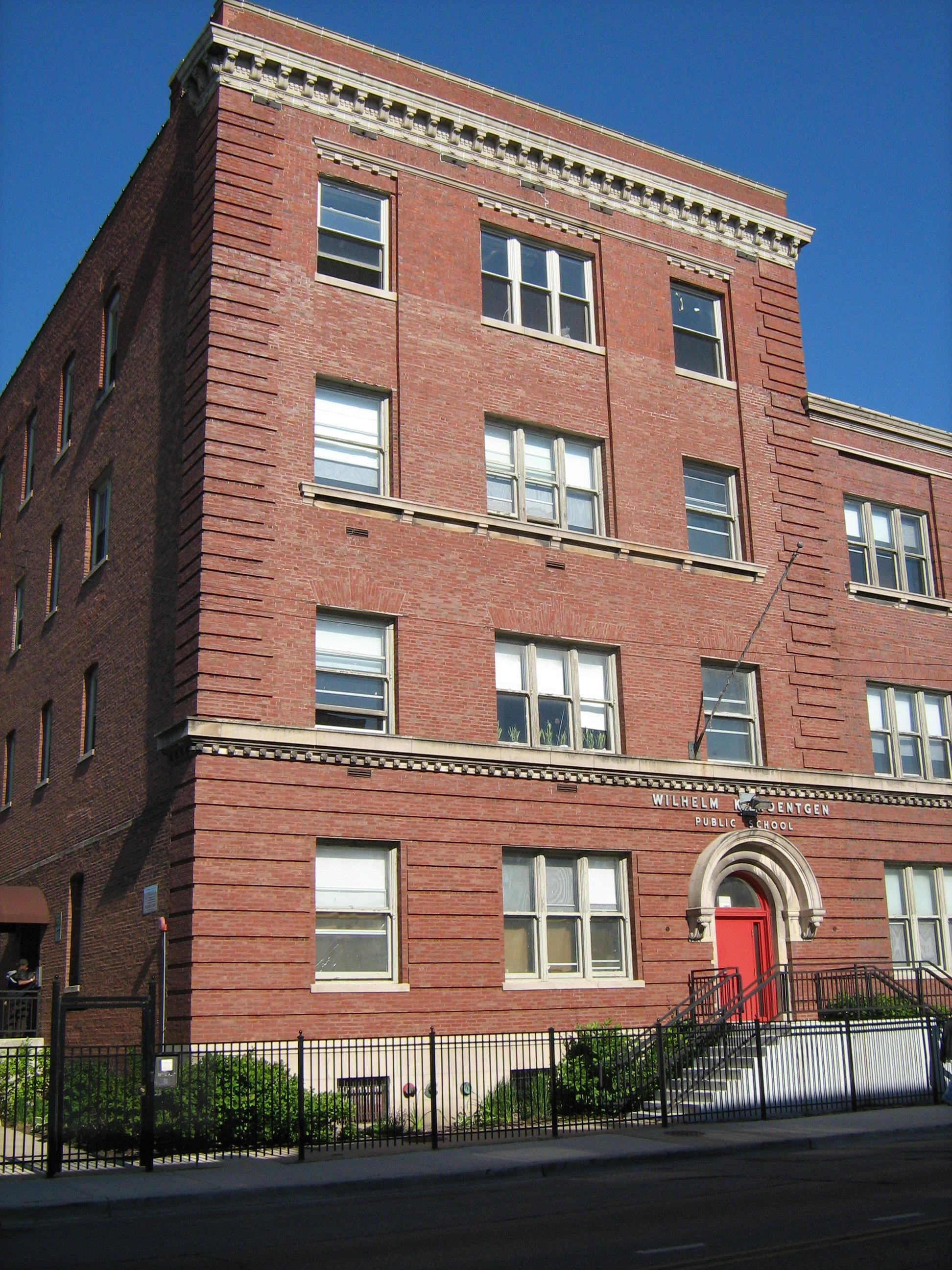
- Location: 17 S. Homan Ave., Chicago, Illinois
- Coordinates: 41°52′49″N 87°42′39″W
- Area: 0.3 acres (0.12 ha)
- Built: 1906-07
- Architect: Pond and Pond
- Architectural style: Classical Revival
- NRHP reference No.: 01000594
- Added to NRHP: May 30, 2001

The Chicago Telephone Company Kedzie Exchange is a historic telephone exchange building located at 17 S. Homan Avenue in the East Garfield Park neighborhood of Chicago, Illinois, United States.

Constructed between 1906 and 1907, it was part of a wave of telephone exchanges established across Chicago as demand for telephone service expanded rapidly around the turn of the 20th century. Chicago architecture firm Pond and Pond designed the Classical Revival building. The building's design is noteworthy for its decorative elements, which include a dentillated cornice and belt course and an arched entrance with floral corbels. Early telephone exchanges were staffed almost entirely by women, and Pond and Pond believed that a decorative design would be more inviting to female workers than a plain and functional building. Major Chicago firm Holabird & Roche designed three additions to the building in 1913, 1928, and 1948. The telephone exchange closed in the 1960s, and the building was subsequently used by the Wilhelm K. Roentgen Elementary School through the 1990s.

The building was added to the National Register of Historic Places on May 30, 2001.
