= Mountain States Telephone Building =

- Telephone Building
- U.S. National Register of Historic Places
- Colorado State Register of Historic Properties
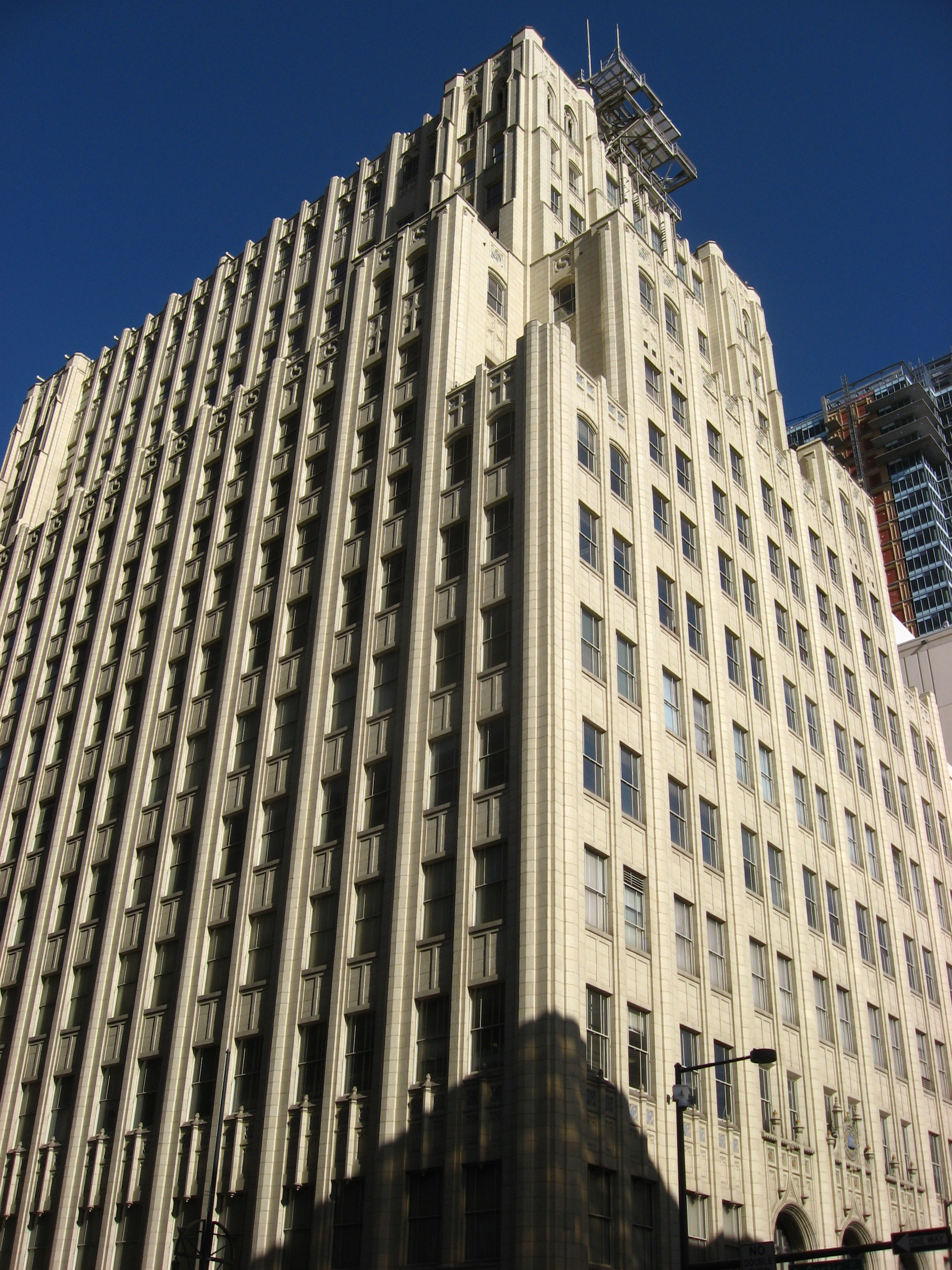

- Location within Colorado Location within the United States
- Location: 931 14th St., Denver, Colorado
- Coordinates: 39°44′41″N 104°59′42″W
- Area: less than one acre
- Built: 1929
- Architect: William N. Bowman; et al.
- Architectural style: Late Gothic Revival, "Modern American Perpendicular Gothic"
- MPS: Downtown Denver MPS
- NRHP reference No.: 04001555
- CSRHP No.: 5DV.522
- Added to NRHP: January 26, 2005

The Mountain States Telephone Building (also known as Telephone Building) is a historic building located at 931 14th Street in Denver, Colorado, United States. It was listed on the National Register of Historic Places on January 26, 2005.

It served as the headquarters of the Mountain States Telephone & Telegraph Company, later known as Mountain Bell. Constructed in a variant of the Gothic Revival style named "Modern American Perpendicular Gothic," the building was designed by local architect William N. Bowman. The new building, completed in 1929, was built to provide dial telephone service for the first time in Denver.

It is a 15-story building with buff-colored terra cotta, on a pink granite base. According to its NRHP nomination, the "Mountain States Telephone and Telegraph Company, the building's original owner, called its architectural style 'Modern American Perpendicular Gothic,' referring to its setbacks, massing, vertically, and Gothic Revival style ornamentation." The Gothic Revival architecture of the Mountain States Telephone Building is featured on many of Denver's Architectural tours.

The entrance of the building features 13 murals from the history of telecommunications by Allen Tupper True, which were painted in 1929. The murals are located at several of the entrance lobbies and in one location inside the building.

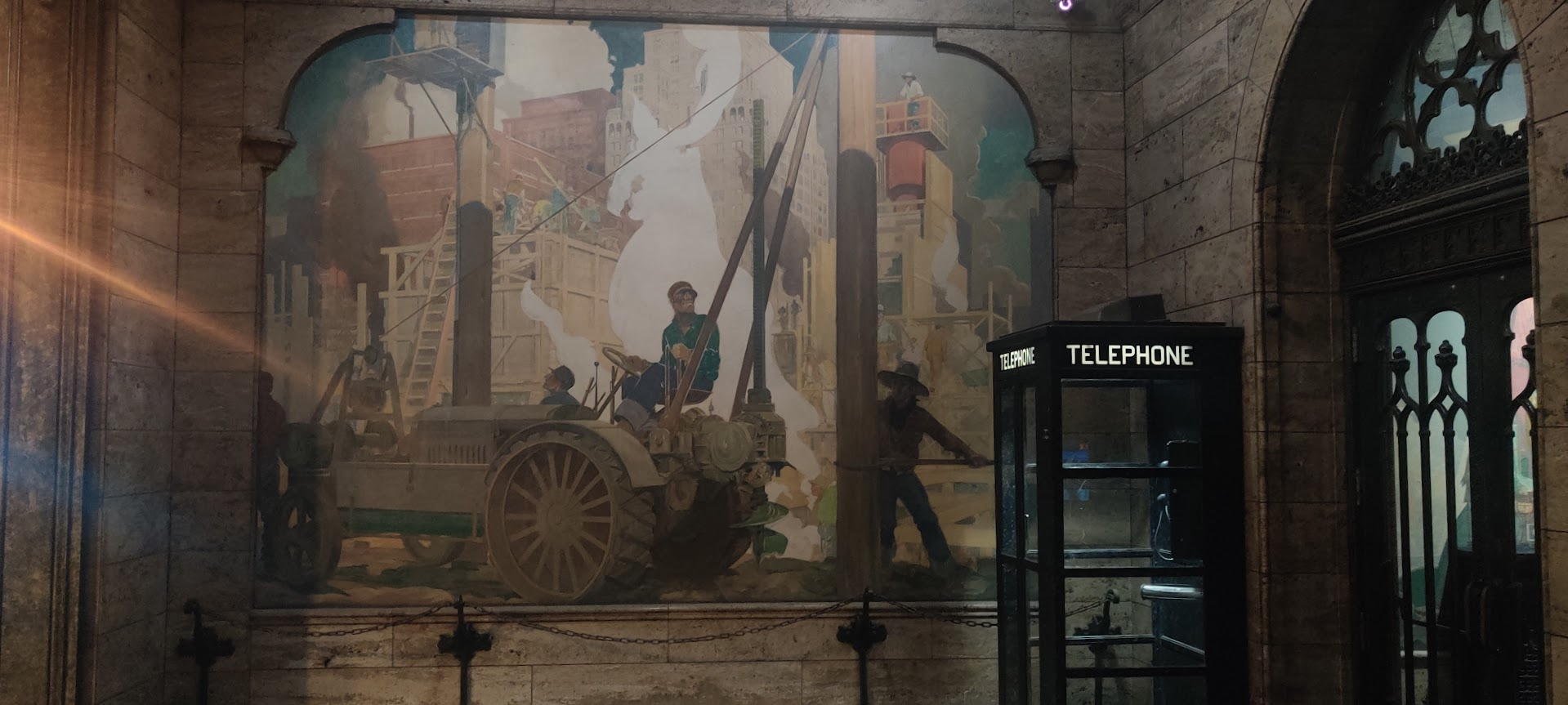

== See also ==
- Mountain States Telephone and Telegraph Company Building (Miles City, Montana)
