= Chesapeake and Potomac Telephone Company Warehouse and Repair Facility =

- U.S. National Register of Historic Places
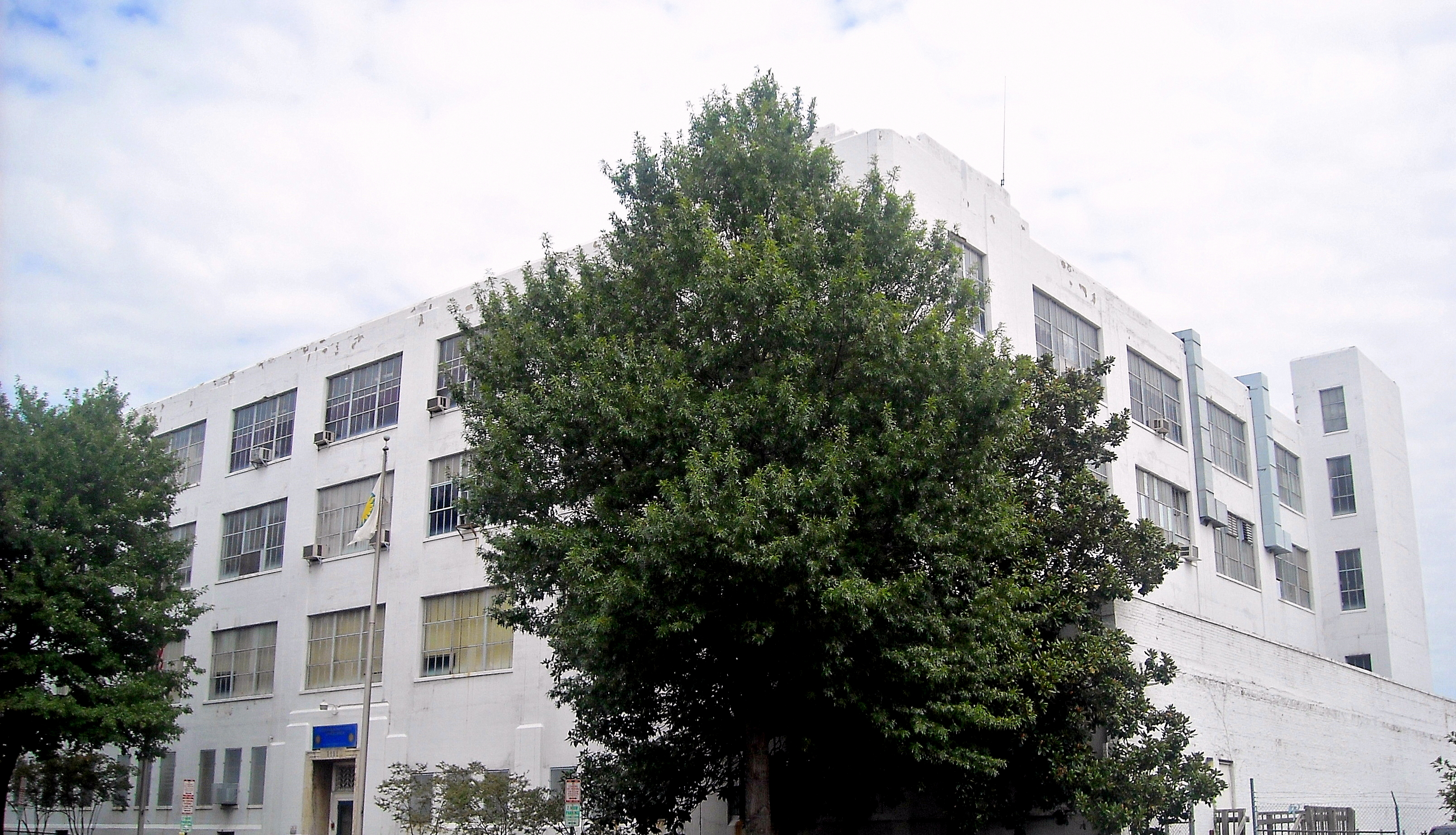

- Location within Central Washington, D.C. Location within the District of Columbia Location within the United States
- Location: 1111 North Capitol Street, N.E., Washington, D.C.
- Coordinates: 38°54′15.48″N 77°0′32.4″W
- Built: 1927
- Architect: McKenzie, Voorhees & Gmelin
- Architectural style: Art Deco
- NRHP reference No.: 06001159
- Added to NRHP: May 14, 2007

The Chesapeake and Potomac Telephone Company Warehouse and Repair Facility is an Art Deco industrial building, located at 1111 North Capitol Street, Northeast, Washington, D.C., in the NoMa neighborhood which houses the headquarters of National Public Radio.

== History ==
It was built in 1927. It housed C & P Telephone Company’s fleet of repair trucks, and telephone overhaul shop.

It was listed on the National Register of Historic Places, in 2006. It was leased with an option to purchase, by the Smithsonian Institution. It was redeveloped with new construction as the fourth headquarters building of National Public Radio, which opened in April 2013. A new office tower of 10 to 12 stories was built behind the historic façade.

== See also ==
- National Register of Historic Places listings in Washington, D.C.
- Chesapeake and Potomac Telephone Company Building
- Chesapeake and Potomac Telephone Company, Old Main Building
