= Chesapeake and Potomac Telephone Company Building =

- U.S. National Register of Historic Places
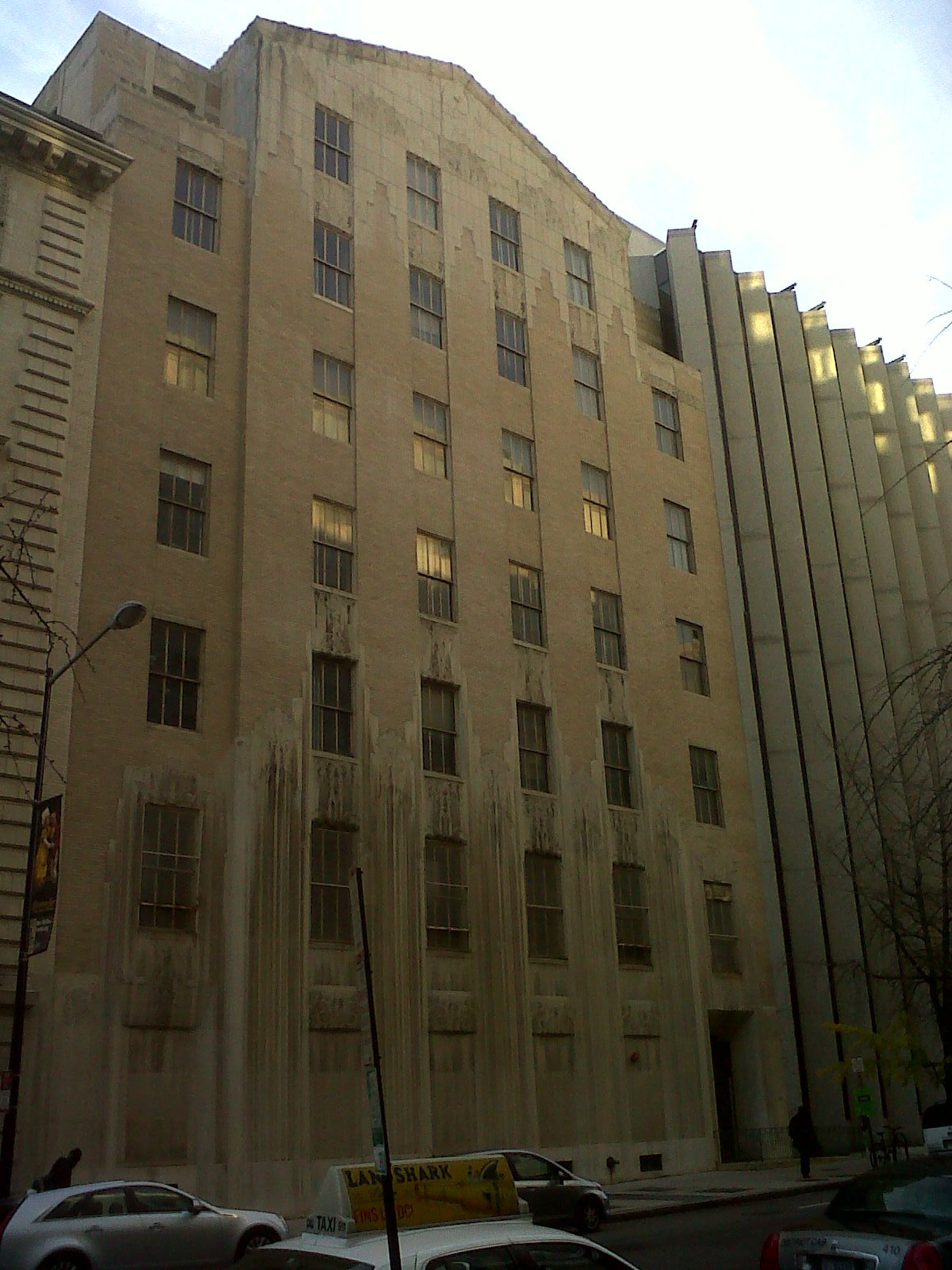
- Chesapeake and Potomac Telephone Company Building in 2011

- Location within Washington, D.C.
- Location: 730 Twelfth St., NW; Washington, D.C.
- Coordinates: 38°53′56″N 77°1′42″W
- Built: 1927-1928
- Architect: Voorhees, Gmelin and Walker
- Architectural style: Art Deco
- NRHP reference No.: 88001112
- Added to NRHP: August 5, 1988

The Chesapeake and Potomac Telephone Company Building is a historic structure located in Downtown Washington, D.C. It was listed on the National Register of Historic Places in 1988.

== History ==
This was the third building C&P Telephone built in downtown Washington and the second in a two-year period of time. This seven-story structure housed the company's new dial switching equipment that could not be accommodated in its existing facilities. It was designed with Art Deco detailing and ornamentation by the New York architectural firm of Voorhees, Gmelin and Walker. The company began its first conversion to dial telephone service on May 3, 1930, when 60,000 telephones in downtown Washington were switched over from the old manual system.

== See also ==
- Chesapeake and Potomac Telephone Company, Old Main Building
- Chesapeake and Potomac Telephone Company Warehouse and Repair Facility
