= Bell Telephone Exchange Building (Powelton Village, Philadelphia, Pennsylvania) =

- U.S. National Register of Historic Places
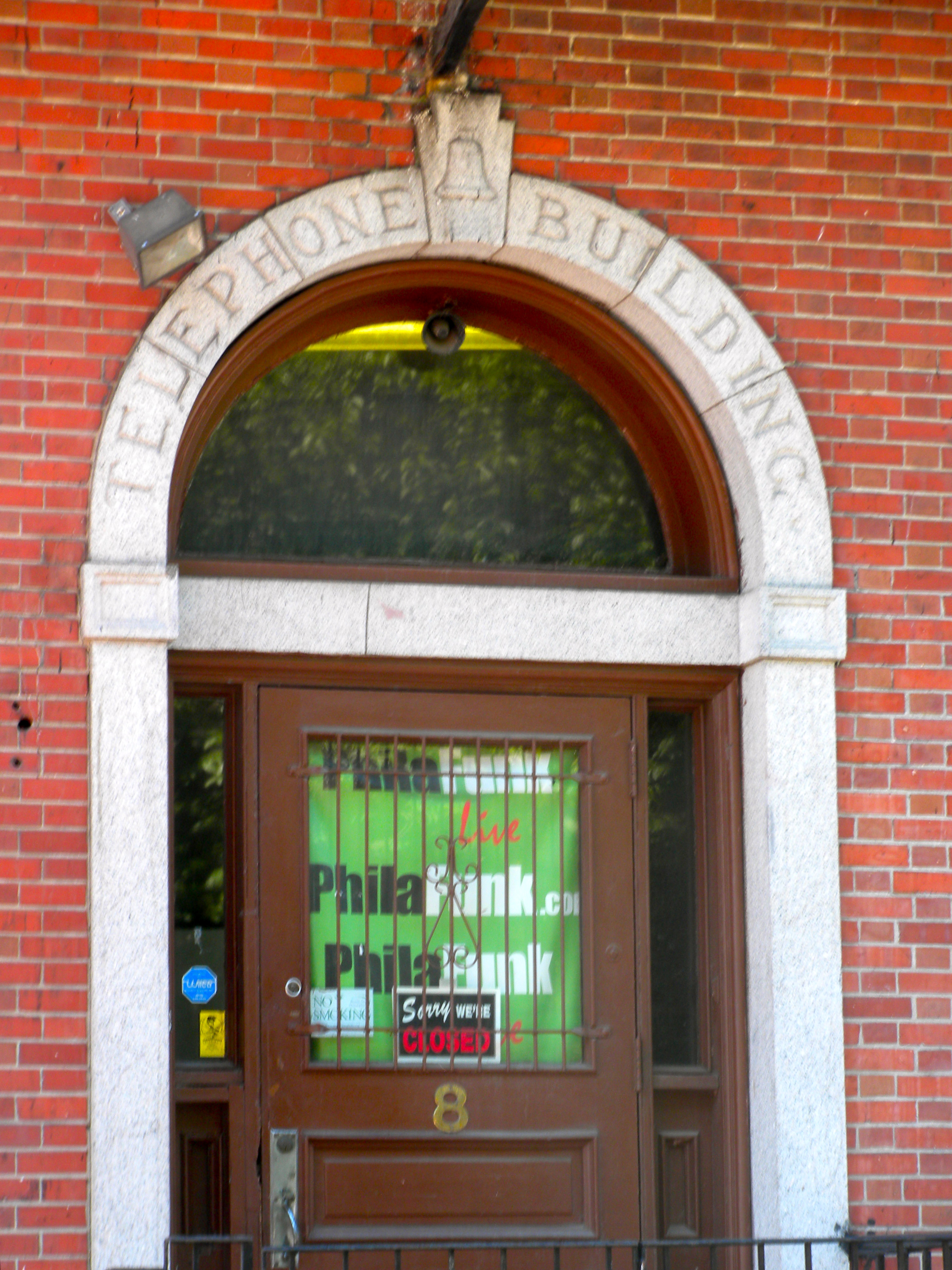
- Bell Telephone Exchange Building detail, May 2010

- Location within Philadelphia Location within Pennsylvania Location within the United States
- Location: 8-12 N. Preston St., Philadelphia, Pennsylvania
- Coordinates: 39°57′28″N 75°12′15″W
- Area: less than one acre
- Built: c. 1900
- Architectural style: Georgian Revival
- NRHP reference No.: 02000227
- Added to NRHP: March 20, 2002

Bell Telephone Exchange Building, also known as the Preston Telephone Exchange, is a historic telephone exchange located in the Powelton Village neighborhood of Philadelphia, Pennsylvania. It was built about 1900, by the Bell Telephone Company. It is a three-story, five-bay, brick building on a raised basement and once set within a set of rowhouses. It is in the Georgian Revival style. It features an arched entrance and decorative cornice above the second story. It was used as a telephone exchange until 1928.

It was added to the National Register of Historic Places in 2002.
