= American Telephone & Telegraph Co. Building (Davenport, Iowa) =

- U.S. National Register of Historic Places
- Location within Iowa Location within the United States
- Location: 529 Main St. Davenport, Iowa
- Coordinates: 41°31′32″N 90°34′31″W
- Area: less than one acre
- Built: 1902
- Architectural style: Romanesque
- MPS: Davenport MRA
- NRHP reference No.: 83002396
- Added to NRHP: July 7, 1983

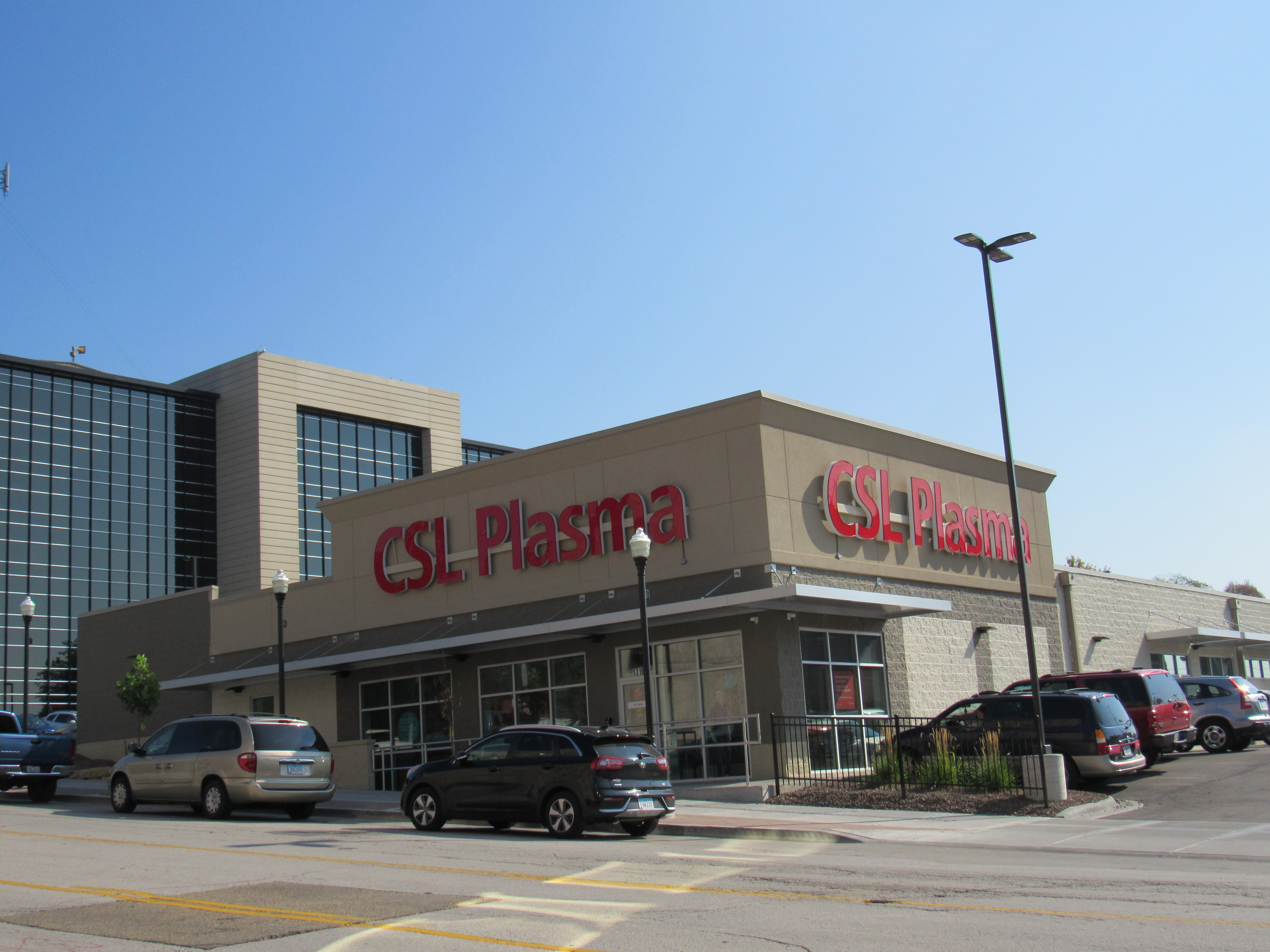
The historic AT&T building was located where CSL Plasma is now located.

The American Telephone & Telegraph Co. Building was a historic building located on the hill just north of downtown Davenport, Iowa, United States. It was listed on the National Register of Historic Places in 1983. The building has subsequently been torn down.

== History ==
The American Telephone and Telegraph Company built this building in 1902. Ten years later the Iowa Telephone Company joined them in this facility. The two companies moved across Main Street not long after that and AT&T eventually bought out Iowa Telephone. The Knights of Columbus, a Catholic fraternal organization, used the building as their clubhouse for a number of years. They were replaced by a labor union who used the building for their local headquarters.

== Architecture ==
The building was an example of the Romanesque Revival style made popular by Henry Hobson Richardson. Completed in 1902, it featured smooth brick walls, round-arched windows on the second floor and a decorative cornice in brick above. The lower level had large rectangular windows with sills and lintels of roughly-worked sandstone that contrasted with the smooth brick. The corner of the building at Sixth and Main Streets was angled and contained the main entrance into the building.
