= Mountain States Telephone and Telegraph Company Building (Meridian, Idaho) =

- U.S. National Register of Historic Places
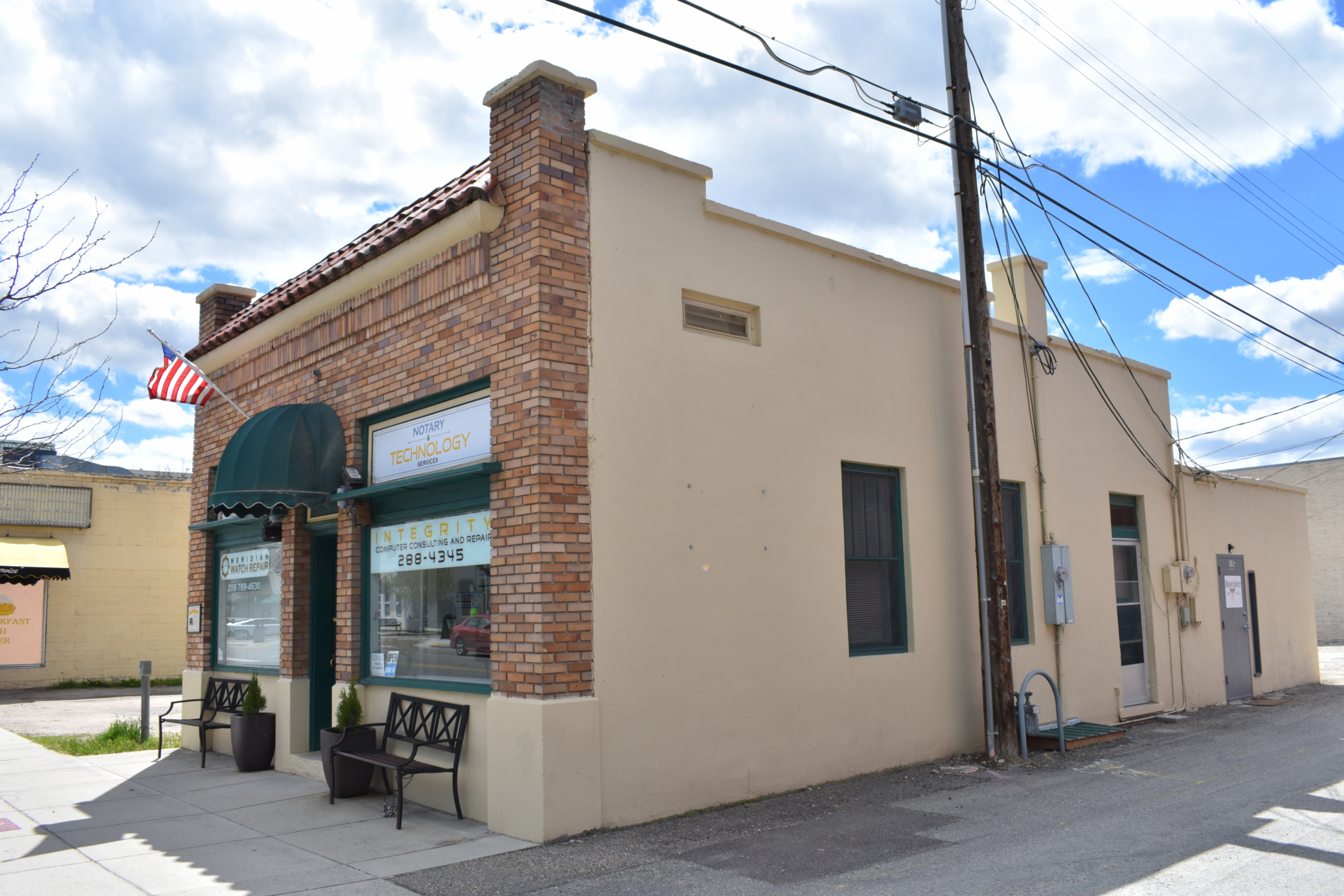
- The Mountain States Telephone & Telegraph Co. Bldg. in 2019

- Location within Idaho Location within the United States
- Location: 815 N. Main St., Meridian, Idaho
- Coordinates: 43°36′42″N 116°23′34″W
- Area: less than one acre
- Built: 1928
- Built by: Heikes, William; et al.
- Architectural style: Late 19th And 20th Century Revivals
- NRHP reference No.: 08000905
- Added to NRHP: September 17, 2008

The Mountain States Telephone and Telegraph Company Building in Meridian, Idaho, is a 1-story commercial office constructed of reinforced concrete, stucco, and brick in 1928. The building features a short, modest tile roof above its Main Street entrance, indicating a Spanish Revival design influence. The Main Street exposure is clad with brick veneer, and above the entrance is a corbelled brick frieze band. A masonry garage was added at the rear of the building in 1948. The garage was remodeled in 1998.

The building was constructed by local contractors William Heikes, Gus Scholin, and William Howry from plans provided by the Mountain States Telephone & Telegraph Company, and it was added to the National Register of Historic Places in 2008.

== Mountain States Telephone & Telegraph Company ==
The Mountain States Telephone & Telegraph Company (MST&T) was formed in 1911 from assets previously owned by the Rocky Mountain Bell Telephone Company and other telephone exchanges. In 1927 MST&T incorporated its Meridian exchange from assets purchased from Homer Tolleth's Independent Telephone Exchange.
