= American Telephone and Telegraph Company Building (Denmark, South Carolina) =

- U.S. National Register of Historic Places
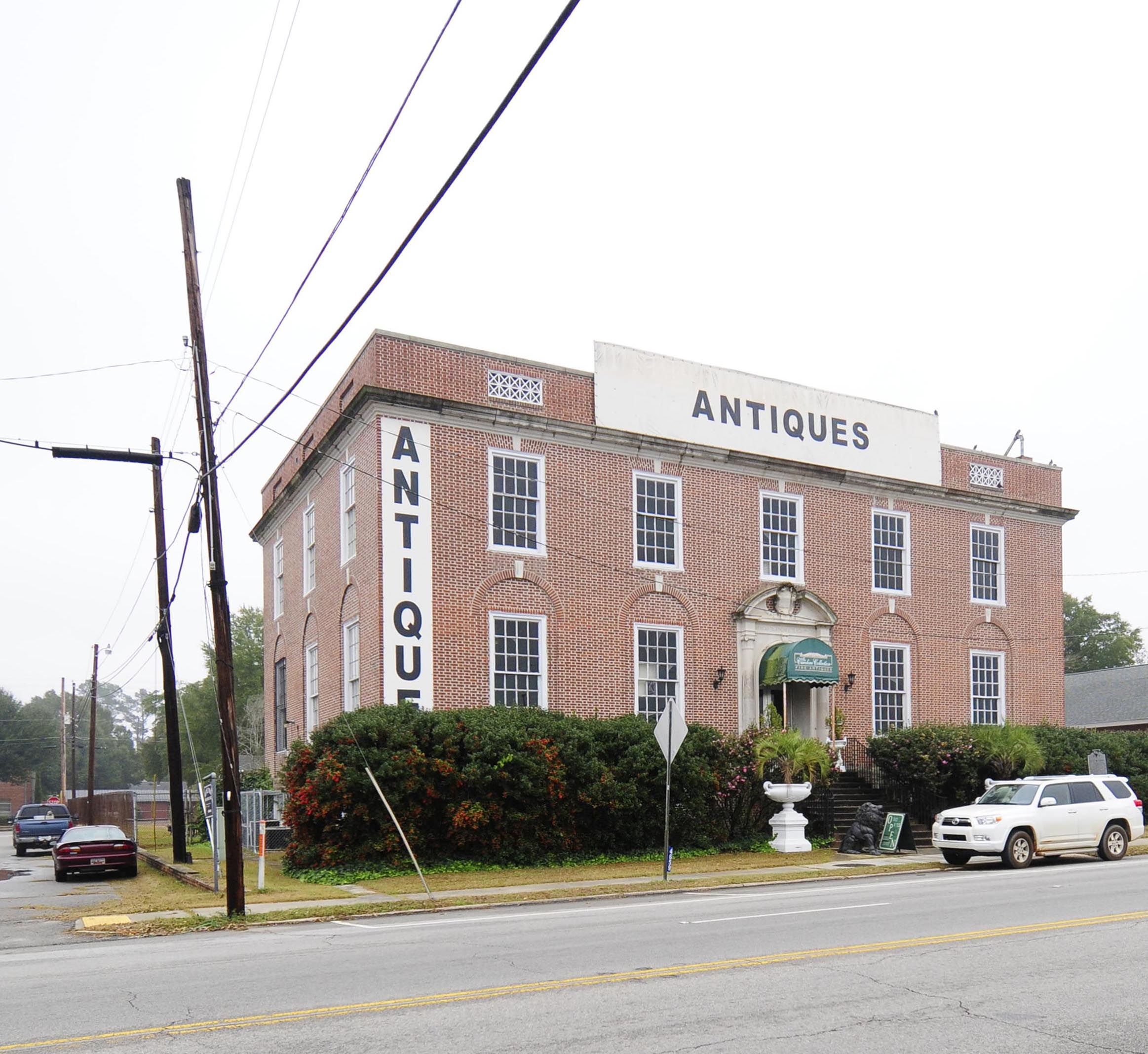

- Location within South Carolina Location within the United States
- Location: 124 N. Palmetto Ave., Denmark, South Carolina
- Coordinates: 33°19′36″N 81°8′31″W
- Area: less than one acre
- Built: 1922
- Architect: Lacy, T.N.; Woodward, D.H.
- Architectural style: Colonial Revival
- NRHP reference No.: 99000815
- Added to NRHP: July 8, 1999

The American Telephone & Telegraph Company Building, located in Denmark, a city in Bamberg County, South Carolina was built in 1922.

The Georgian Revival building functioned as a telephone switching station for messages sent in the South Carolina Lowcountry. The site was listed in the National Register of Historic Places July 8, 1999.

== See also ==
- National Register of Historic Places in Bamberg County, South Carolina
