= Rocky Mountain Bell Telephone Company Building (Idaho Falls, Idaho) =

- U.S. National Register of Historic Places
- Location within Idaho Location within the United States
- Location: 246 W. Broadway Ave., Idaho Falls, Idaho
- Coordinates: 43°29′29″N 112°02′20″W
- Area: less than one acre
- Built: 1910
- Architectural style: Renaissance
- MPS: Idaho Falls Downtown MRA
- NRHP reference No.: 84001099
- Added to NRHP: August 30, 1984

The Rocky Mountain Bell Telephone Company Building in Idaho Falls, Idaho, at 246 W. Broadway Ave., was built in 1910. It was listed on the National Register of Historic Places in 1984.

It was a two-story commercial building, built of yellow brick with pinkish-gray stone trim, upon a stone foundation.

It was the earliest building with elements of Renaissance Revival style in downtown Idaho Falls; the later Shane Building, Underwood Hotel, Hotel Idaho, and Farmers and Merchants Bank have more of that.

It was deemed "historically significant for its association with an early Idaho Falls communications company"; it was used by the phone company into the late 1920s.

It was later used as a parish hall, named Faber Hall, for the Catholic Church. It was used from 1953 on by the local carpenters union for use as a meeting hall and offices by several unions, and was called the Labor Temple.

The building is no longer standing.
