= Telephone Exchange Building (Norwich, Connecticut) =

- U.S. National Register of Historic Places
- U.S. Historic district – Contributing property
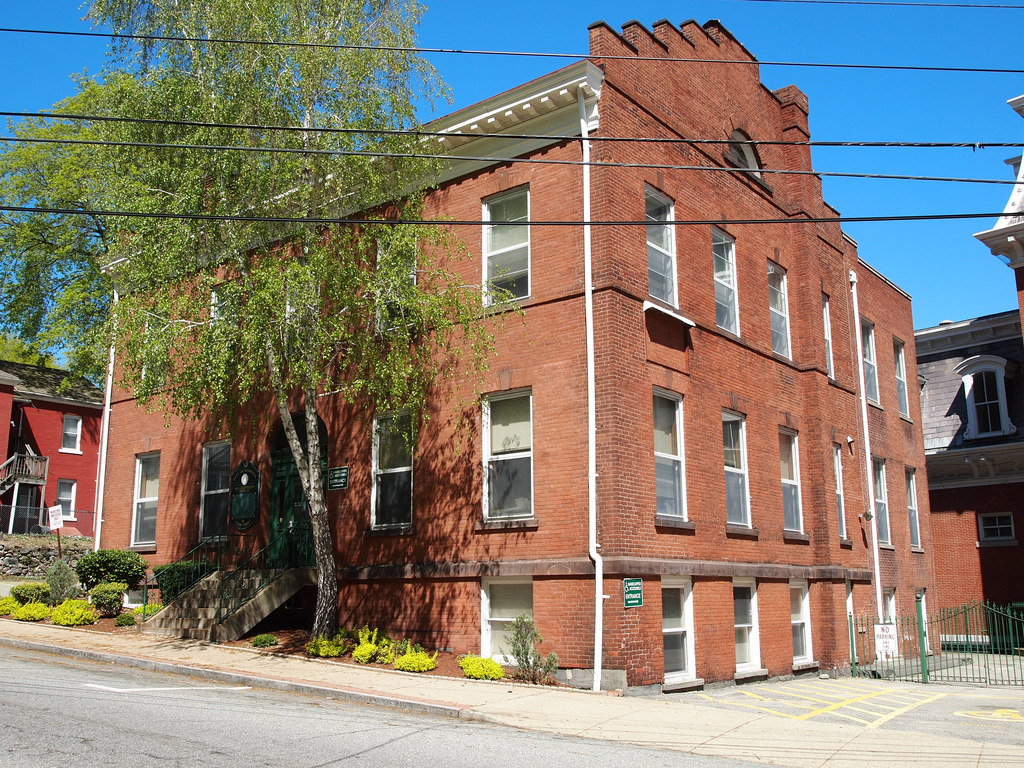

- Location within Connecticut Location within the United States
- Location: 23 Union Street, Norwich, Connecticut
- Coordinates: 41°31′36″N 72°4′35″W
- Area: 0.2 acres (0.081 ha)
- Built: 1906
- Built by: C. Morgan Williams
- Architect: Leoni W. Robinson
- Architectural style: Colonial Revival
- Part of: Downtown Norwich Historic District (ID85000707)
- NRHP reference No.: 83003590

Significant dates
- Added to NRHP: November 28, 1983
- Designated CP: April 4, 1985

The Telephone Exchange Building is a historic building at 23 Union Street in downtown Norwich, Connecticut, behind Norwich Town Hall. Built in 1906-07, it was the first purpose-built telephone exchange utility building in the city, and is a little-altered example of period exchanges built by the Southern New England Telephone Company. The building now houses city offices. It was listed on the National Register of Historic Places on November 28, 1983.

== Description and history ==
The former Telephone Exchange Building is located in central Norwich, on the east side of Union Street directly behind Norwich Town Hall. It is a 2-1/2 story Georgian Colonial Revival brick building, with a gabled roof that has stepped gable ends. It is set on a brick foundation that is partially exposed, with a brownstone water table. The main facade is five bays wide, with its entrance centered under an elliptically curved archway. The archway, like the flanking window openings, has a brownstone keystone. The interior has been substantially altered from its original use, having housed the police station and city offices.

The Southern New England Telephone Company (SNETCO) was responsible from introducing telephone service into Connecticut beginning in the late 19th century. The company built this building to house the telephone exchange and associated infrastructure when it upgraded service to the Norwich area in 1906-07. The main switchboard was located on the east wall of the second floor, while the basement housed an array of batteries for use in the common battery method of powering telephone service. The ground floor housed a lounge area for company employees, and a terminal room in which wires entered the building for distribution either to the switchboard or batteries. The building is very similar in design to exchanges the company built in Danbury and Middletown at the same time, and was the first purpose-built exchange building in Norwich. It remained in service until 1948, when the company moved the exchange to larger quarters on Chestnut Street. The building was acquired by the city, which converted it into a police station, with jail cells in the basement and offices on the main and upper levels.

The architect of the building was Leoni W. Robinson of New Haven, and the contractor was C. Morgan Williams of Norwich.

== See also ==
- National Register of Historic Places listings in New London County, Connecticut
