= Mountain States Telephone and Telegraph Company Building (Miles City, Montana) =

- Mountain States Telephone and Telegraph Company
- U.S. National Register of Historic Places
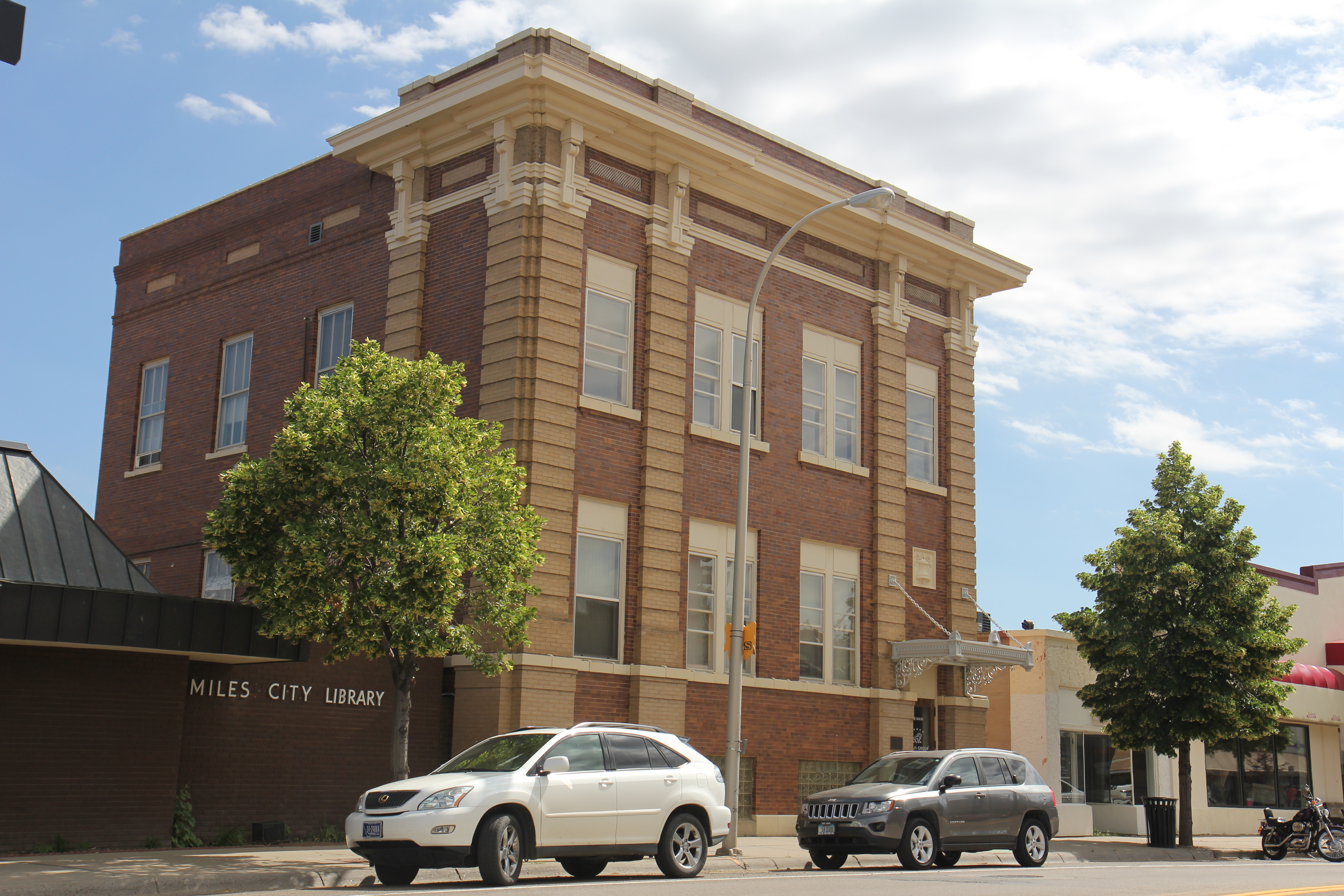

- Location within Montana Location within the United States
- Location: 908 Main St., Miles City, Montana
- Coordinates: 46.407222°N 105.845556°W
- Area: less than one acre
- Built: 1914
- Built by: C.F. Walker Contracting Co.
- Architectural style: Renaissance Revival
- NRHP reference No.: 88001118
- Added to NRHP: July 21, 1988

The Mountain States Telephone and Telegraph Company in Miles City in Custer County, Montana was built in 1914. Also known as the Rowland, Thomas & Co. Building, it includes Renaissance Revival. It was listed on the National Register of Historic Places in 1988.

The building was originally occupied by Mountain States Telephone Company, later by the Rowland, Thomas & Co public accounting firm which was acquired by Avitus Group, Inc (the current occupant).

The building is a tall two-story building, on a raised basement and with a high parapet with a pressed metal cornice. Its walls are of pressed red brick, and it has rusticated piers made of buff-colored brick.

The Mesker Bros. Iron Co. of St. Louis provided the building's hollow section steel window sashes and its cast-iron stairs, and it may also have provided the building's entrance canopy and the cornice.

It was designed by an unknown architect of the Mountain States Telephone and Telegraph Co. and was built for $30,000 by C.E. Walker Contracting Co. of Denver, Colorado. C.E. Walker built similar buildings for the company in Lewistown, Montana in 1912, in Helena, Montana (a major addition) in 1926, in Missoula, Montana (a major addition) in 1926–29, all in Renaissance Revival style. It also built buildings in Havre, Montana (in Prairie style) in 1925, in Great Falls, Montana (in Art Deco style) in 1930, and in Billings, Montana (in Collegiate Gothic) in 1930.

The listing includes a 1931-built garage at the back of the property, which is a second contributing building.
