= Old Bell Telephone Building (Osceola, Arkansas) =

- U.S. National Register of Historic Places
- U.S. Historic district – Contributing property
- Location within Arkansas Location within the United States
- Location: 100 blk. of Ash St., Osceola, Arkansas
- Coordinates: 35°42′12″N 89°57′59″W
- Area: less than one acre
- Built: 1911
- Built by: R. C. Rose
- Part of: Hale Avenue Historic District (ID08000722)
- MPS: Osceola MRA
- NRHP reference No.: 87001353

Significant dates
- Added to NRHP: August 6, 1987
- Designated CP: August 1, 2008

The Old Bell Telephone Building is a historic commercial building at 109 North Ash Street in downtown Osceola, Arkansas. It is a two-story flat-roof brick building, built in 1911 to house the town's telephone exchange. The building is three bays wide, with the door in the right bay, with a transom window above. There is an original brass slot for accepting payments between the doorway and the center window. The building was built by R. C. Rose, a local attorney who owned the telephone exchange.

The building was listed on the National Register of Historic Places in 1987.

== See also ==
- National Register of Historic Places listings in Mississippi County, Arkansas
