= List of American sculptors exhibited at the 1893 World's Columbian Exposition =

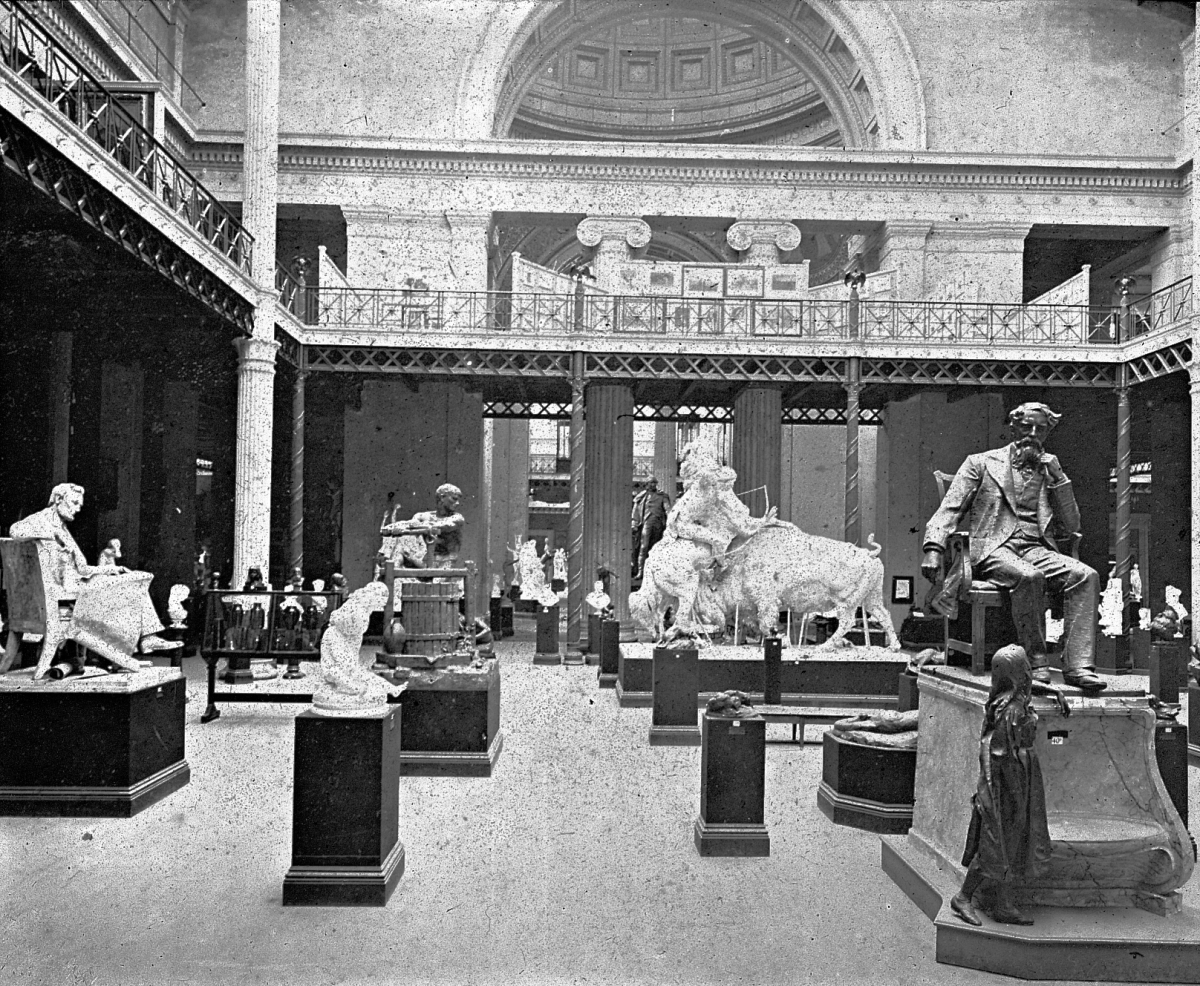
United States Section, Court of Statuary, Palace of Fine Arts. Elwell's Charles Dickens and Little Nell in the right foreground

Sculpture could be found at the 1893 World's Columbian Exposition in various different places and serving a diverse number of functions. The works displayed in the specially designed sculpture exhibition halls tended to be by the better known artists of the day but the visitors to the Expo did not need to enter the buildings to find sculpture. The grounds, especially around the lagoon areas and decorating the various bridges were liberally sprinkled with sculpture, most of it made out of staff, an impermanent material. Also to be found were a number of fountains. Another form of sculpture at the Fair, also made of staff, was the architectural sculpture that adorned a large number of the buildings.

== Architectural sculpture ==
But here it might be well to say something of the material of which they are constructed, the new and wonderful "staff." It has the properties of both common plaster and cement, and can be worked into any required design; in hardening it shows an ivory-like surface, which, however, can be colored in any desired tint. Thus the most ornate architectural effects are produced, and all the buildings, being covered with this decorative substance, present the appearance of veritable palaces. For the designs, etc., it is modeled into plates the required size and joined invisibly, and it is estimated that about 500,000 of these pieces have been used in the large buildings alone.

Sixteen bridges spanned the lagoons that meandered through the fairgrounds. Four statues of native American mammals, also made of staff, decorated the piers at each end of a bridge.

== The sculptors and their works ==
Artist	Works Exhibited	Image	Medium	Year	Current Collection	Notes
Herbert Adams	St. Agnes' Eve		plaster	1892	unlocated	
Herbert Adams	Primavera		polychromed marble	1890-92	Corcoran Gallery of Art	
Herbert Adams	Portrait Bust of a Lady; Adeline Valentine		marble	1889	The Hispanic Society of America	
Thomas Ball	Portrait of a Lady		plaster	1889	unlocated	
Thomas Ball	Paul Revere		bronze	1883	Cincinnati Art Museum	
Thomas Ball	Portrait of a Gentleman		plaster		unlocated	
Thomas Ball	Colossal Statue of George Washington		bronze	1889-93	Forest Lawn Memorial Park	In the Rotunda:
Thomas Ball	Christ and the Little Child		marble	1881	Mary Provincial House; Methuen, Massachusetts	
Paul Wayland Bartlett	Medallion portrait of the Rev. Dr. Thomas H. Skinner		bronze	1892	Chrysler Museum of Art; Norfolk, Virginia	
Paul Wayland Bartlett	Bust of Mrs. B (Emily Montgomery Skinner Bartlett)		marble	1892	unlocated	
Paul Wayland Bartlett	Bohemian and Bears		plaster	1887	Art Institute of Chicago	Presumed destroyed
Paul Wayland Bartlett	The Bohemian Bear Tamer		bronze	1889	Metropolitan Museum of Art	
Paul Wayland Bartlett	The Ghost Dance (study of the nude)		plaster	1889	unlocated	
Paul Wayland Bartlett	Sundance or Ghost Dance		bronze	1889	National Museum of American Art; Smithsonian Institution	
George Edwin Bissell	John Watts, the last Royal Recorder of New York and founder of the Leake and Watts Orphan House		bronze	1892	Trinity Church, New York	
Karl Bitter	Administration Building (architectural sculpture): designed by Richard Morris Hunt; Growth of Civilization – 28 sculpture groups					Destroyed in a July 1894 fire
Karl Bitter	Liberty		staff			
Karl Bitter	Religion		staff			
Karl Bitter	Science		staff			
Karl Bitter	War		staff			
Karl Bitter	Fishermaid and Blacksmith		staff			
Karl Bitter	Water Uncontrolled and Water Controlled		staff			Water Controlled (l) and Water Uncontrolled
Karl Bitter	Fire Uncontrolled and Fire Controlled		staff			
Karl Bitter	Diligence		staff			
Karl Bitter	Patriotism		staff			
Karl Bitter	Truth		staff			
Richard W. Bock						
Richard W. Bock	Electricity Building (architectural sculpture): Solon Spencer Beman, architect		staff			Sculpture contracted from the Philipson Company
Richard W. Bock	Mines and Mining Building (architectural sculpture): Solon Spencer Beman, architect		staff			Sculpture contracted from the Phillipson Company
Richard W. Bock	Manufactures Building: Joseph Schlitz Brewing Company pavilion					
Gutzon Borglum	Indian Scouts		bronze	1891	Forest Lawn Memorial Park	
John J. Boyle	Tired Out		bronze	1887	Pennsylvania Academy of the Fine Arts	
John J. Boyle	Pennsylvania Building (architectural sculpture):					
John J. Boyle	Coat of Arms of the Commonwealth of Pennsylvania (over main entrance)		staff			
John J. Boyle	William Penn and Benjamin Franklin (flanking main entrance)		staff			
John J. Boyle	Mines and Mining (atop corner pavilion)		staff			
John J. Boyle	Science, Manufactures and Agriculture (atop corner pavilion)		staff			
John J. Boyle	Transportation Building (architectural sculpture): Louis Sullivan, architect					Boyle was awarded a medal for his architectural sculpture on the Transportation Building.
John J. Boyle	Apotheosis of Transportation (tympanum over main entrance)		staff			
John J. Boyle	Ancient Transportation (bas-relief panel by main entrance)		staff			
John J. Boyle	George Stephenson; Dennis Papin; James Watt; The Brakeman; Joseph Michael Montgolfier; The Pilot; Robert Fulton (on balustrades of side porches):		staff			
John J. Boyle	The Genius of the Locomotive		staff			
Caroline Shawk Brooks	Lady Godiva Returning		marble			Destroyed in San Francisco earthquake of 1906
Caroline Shawk Brooks	La Rosa (Vanderbilt Group)		marble	1886	private collection	
Caroline Shawk Brooks	Lady Godiva		marble			Destroyed in San Francisco earthquake of 1906
Caroline Shawk Brooks	The Dreaming Iolanthe		marble		unlocated	
Carol Brooks	Enid		plaster		unlocated	
Henry Kirke Bush-Brown	The Buffalo Hunter		plaster	1893		
Alexander Sterling Calder	Cordelia		plaster	1892	unlocated	
Alexander Sterling Calder	Boy with Ribbon		plaster		unlocated	
Thomas Shields Clarke	The Cider Press		bronze	1892	De Young Museum, San Francisco, California	On the grounds of the De Young Museum:
Katherine M. Cohen	Bust of Harry Souther		plaster	1890	unlocated	
Ellen Rankin Copp	Relief portrait of Miss Harriet Monroe		bronze	1893	unlocated	
Cyrus Edwin Dallin	Signal of Peace		bronze	1890	Lincoln Park, Chicago, Illinois	
Cyrus Edwin Dallin	Portrait bust of Dr. I.		marble	ca. 1892	unlocated	
John Talbott Donoghue	The Young Sophocles Leading the Chorus of Victory after the Battle of Salamis		bronze	1885	Honolulu Museum of Art	
John Talbott Donoghue	Kypros		plaster	ca. 1890	unlocated	
John Talbott Donoghue	Hunting Nymph		plaster	1886	unlocated	
Frank Edwin Elwell	Charles Dickens and Little Nell		bronze	1890	Clark Park, 43rd Street & Chester Avenue, Philadelphia, Pennsylvania	Installed in Clark Park, Philadelphia:
Frank Edwin Elwell	Intellect Dominating Brute Force or Diana and the Lion	(foreground, left)	marble	ca. 1893	Fabyan Villa, Geneva, Illinois	
Jacob Fjeldeoio	Bas-relief of Bert Harwoodis		plaster		unlocated	
Jacob Fjeldeoio	Bust of Judge Nelson		bronze	1890	U.S. District Court, St. Paul, Minnesota	
Daniel Chester French	Bust of A. Bronson Alcott		plaster	1889	National Trust for Historic Preservation; Stockbridge, Massachusetts	
Daniel Chester French	Martin Milmore Memorial		bronze	1892	Forest Hills Cemetery, Jamaica Plain, Massachusetts	
Daniel Chester French	Angel of Death and the Sculptor		plaster	1891	Art Institute of Chicago	Destroyed 1949
Daniel Chester French	The Republic				1893 and 1918	A one third sized version of the 65 foot tall statue was placed in Jackson Park, Chicago in 1918:
French and Potter (French created the human figures and Potter the animals.)	Columbian Quadriga		staff	c. 1892–1893		A modified version of this was formed of copper in 1906 as The Progress of the State at the Minnesota State Capitol.
French and Potter (French created the human figures and Potter the animals.)	The Cart Horse Group		staff	1892-93	destroyed	
French and Potter (French created the human figures and Potter the animals.)	Teamster and Horse		staff	c. 1892–1893	destroyed	A rare use of an African-American model
French and Potter (French created the human figures and Potter the animals.)	Statues of Plenty orBulls with Maidens or Ceres, grain and the Old World		staff	c. 1892–1893		A bronze version was erected in Humboldt Park, Chicago in 1912.
French and Potter (French created the human figures and Potter the animals.)	Statues of Plenty or Bulls with Maidens or Native American Corn Goddess		staff	c. 1892–1893		A bronze version was erected in Humboldt Park, Chicago in 1912.
Johannes Gelert	The Little Architect		plaster	ca. 1882	unlocated	
Johannes Gelert	The Struggle for Work		plaster	1892		
Johannes Gelert	Theseus, Victor over the Minotaur		bronze	1886	private collection	
Johannes Gelert	Bust of Abraham Lincoln		plaster	ca. 1892	a bronze version is in a private collection	
Charles Grafly	A Bad Omen		plaster		unlocated	
Charles Grafly	Mauvais Présage		plaster	1891	Edwin A. Ulrich Museum of Art; Wichita State University	study
Charles Grafly	Daedalus		bronze	1889	Pennsylvania Academy of the Fine Arts	
Charles Grafly	Pennsylvania Building: The Genius of Art		plaster	1893		
Jonathan Scott Hartley	Pan		bronze	1885		
Jonathan Scott Hartley	Bust of William Conant		bronze	1890	private collection	
Jonathan Scott Hartley	John Gilbert as Sir Peter Teazle		bronze	1889	The Hampden-Booth Theatre Library; Players Club, New York	
Harriet R. Hyatt	Head of Laughing Girl		plaster		unlocated	
Edward Kemeys	American Black Bear		bronze	1886	Art Institute of Chicago	
Edward Kemeys	Battle of the Bulls		bronze	1890	unlocated	
Edward Kemeys	American Panther and her Cubs		plaster	1878	National Museum of American Art; Smithsonian Institution	
Edward Kemeys	At Bay (Female Panther)					
Edward Kemeys	A Prairie King					
Edward Kemeys	Old Ephriam (Grizzly Bear)		bronze	1885	private collection	
Edward Kemeys	Fighting Panther and Deer		bronze		private collection	
Edward Kemeys	After the Feast		bronze	1878	private collection	
Edward Kemeys	Texan Bull and Jaguars		bronze	1891	National Museum of American Art; Smithsonian Institution	
Edward Kemeys	Jaguar and Boa-constrictor		bronze	1877	private collection	
Edward Kemeys	American Bay Lynx		bronze		unlocated	
Edward Kemeys	Grappling His Game		plaster	before 1885	private collection	
Edward Kemeys	The Still Hunt		bronze		private collection	
Mary Lawrence	Christopher Columbus		staff	1892		
Edmonia Lewis	Woman's Building: Bust of Hiawatha		marble	1868	Metropolitan Museum of Art	One of the few African-American artists who exhibited at the Exposition.
Edmonia Lewis	Woman's Building: Statuettes					
Aloys Loeher	Bust of Jessie Bartlett Davis		marble		unlocated	
Frederick MacMonnies	Columbian Fountain aka The Barge of State aka Columbia, Enthroned, is Propelled by the Arts and Sciences and Steered by Father Time.		staff	1892		
Philip Martiny	Portrait bust of a child (Blanche Martiny)		plaster		unlocated	
Philip Martiny	Palace of Fine Arts (frieze figures): Architecture; Painting; Music; Sculpture; 2 winged caryatides		staff limestone (1920s)			Limestone replicas of the frieze figures were carved in the 1920s, when the building became the Museum of Science and Industry.
Philip Martiny	Agricultural Building (architectural sculpture); McKim Mead & White, architects					Destroyed in a July 1894 fire
Philip Martiny	Ceres groups (flanking the north and south porticoes)		staff			
Philip Martiny	Cattle and Horses groups (north and south facades)		staff			
Philip Martiny	The Four Hemispheres groups (atop the 4 corner pavilions)		staff			Corner pavilion (left):
Philip Martiny	The Four Seasons groups (north and south facades, at the corners)		staff			
Philip Martiny	Signs of the Zodiac (13 cornice figures, east and west facades)		staff			Each figure held a plaque with a Zodiac sign:
Retta T. Matthews	Indiana		marble	1893	Indiana State Capitol, Indianapolis	Commissioned for the Indiana State Building
Larkin Goldsmith Mead						
Larkin Goldsmith Mead	Agricultural Building (architectural sculpture): The Triumph of Ceres (pedimental group on north façade)		staff			Agricultural Building north entrance: Destroyed in a July 1894 fire
Larkin Goldsmith Mead	The Return of Proserpine from the Realms of Pluto (pedimental group on south façade)		staff			Destroyed in a July 1894 fire
Samuel Murray	Portrait bust of Walt Whitman		bronze	1892	Hirshhorn Museum and Sculpture Garden; Smithsonian Institution	
Samuel Murray	Study of a child's head (William Brown)		bronze	1892	unlocated	
Samuel Murray	Study of a child's head (William Brown)		plaster	1892	Hirshhorn Museum and Sculpture Garden; Smithsonian Institution	
Blanche Nevin	Woman's Building (Gallery of Honor): Maud Muller		marble	c.1876	Iris Club, Lancaster, Pennsylvania	
Charles Henry Niehaus	Historical Door of Trinity Church		plaster			bronze versions at north door, Trinity Church, New York
Charles Henry Niehaus	Athlete (Caestus)		plaster	1883-85	Metropolitan Museum of Art	Cast in bronze, 1901
William Rudolf O'Donovan	Portrait bust of Thomas Eakins		bronze		unlocated	
William Rudolf O'Donovan	Portrait bust of Robert Swain Gifford		bronze		unlocated	
Richard Henry Park	Mines and Mining Building (Montana pavilion): Justice		Silver			The work was cast out of pure silver. The model for the figure was Ada Rehan.
William Ordway Partridge	William Shakespeare		plaster			Bronze version in Lincoln Park, Chicago:
William Ordway Partridge	A Dream (Midsummer Night's Dream)		marble			
William Ordway Partridge	Madonna (Madonna in Her Maturity)		plaster		Dayton Art Institute, Dayton, Ohio	
Bela Pratt	Genius of Navigation		staff	c. 1892–1893		Two copies of this work were made, placed at the front and back of the Peristyle. They were destroyed by the 1894 fire.
Bela Pratt	Genius of Discovery		staff	c. 1892–1893		Two copies of this work were made, placed at the front and back of the Peristyle
Vinnie Ream (Lavinia Ellen Ream Hoxie)	Woman's Building (Rotunda): The West aka The Virgin West		marble		Wisconsin State Capitol; Madison, Wisconsin	also displayed at the Centennial International Exhibition of 1876
Vinnie Ream (Lavinia Ellen Ream Hoxie)	Woman's Building (Rotunda): America		marble	1870	State Historical Society of Iowa, Des Moines	
Vinnie Ream (Lavinia Ellen Ream Hoxie)	Woman's Building (Rotunda): Miriam		marble		Private collection	
David Richards	Near Woman's Building: Hide and Seek			1893		
Alice M. Rideout	Woman's Building (architectural sculpture): Pediment		staff			The pediment was 7 ft tall and 45 ft long
Alice M. Rideout	Winged figures: Woman's Virtues; Woman as the Spirit of Civilization; Woman's Place in History					
Alice M. Rideout	Seated figures					
Carl Rohl-Smith	Mato Wanartaka (Kicking Bear), Chief of the Sioux		plaster			
Carl Rohl-Smith	Portrait bust of Henry Watterson		bronze			
Carl Rohl-Smith	Electricity Building (main entrance): The Pioneer of Electric Science— Benjamin Franklin and His Kite		staff	1892-93		The Electricity Building at Night by Charles Graham: Presumed lost in a July 1894 fire
Augustus Saint-Gaudens	Diana finial of McKim, Mead and White's Agriculture Building		copper	1892-93		original destroyed, various smaller versions are listed in Diana
Anne Whitney	Roma		plaster	1893		bronze cast version (1890) in Davis Museum at Wellesley College
Anne Whitney	Woman's Building: Leif Ericson		bronzed plaster	1889	National Museum of Women in the Arts, Washington, D.C.	The original bronze (1885–87) is in Boston, Massachusetts. A bronze replica (1887) is in Milwaukee, Wisconsin.
Anne Whitney	Woman's Building: Bust of Lucy Stone		marble	1893	Boston Public Library, Boston, Massachusetts	
Anne Whitney	Woman's Building (Library): Bust of Harriet Beecher Stowe		marble	1892	Harriet Beecher Stowe Center, Hartford, Connecticut	Beside the bust (at far left in the photo) was a cabinet containing copies of Uncle Tom's Cabin in 42 languages.

== See also ==
- List of American painters exhibited at the 1893 World's Columbian Exposition
