= Aloys Loeher =

- Born: 1850; Paderborn, Germany
- Died: 1904 (aged 53–54); Silver Springs, New York, United States
- Known for: Sculptor
- Notable work: Siegfried Monument, New York; Fritz Reuter Monument, Chicago

Aloys Loeher (1850–1904) was an American sculptor. He created a signature piece which was exhibited at the 1893 Columbian Exposition. Among his other works are the Siegfried Monument in New York, the Fritz Reuter Monument in Chicago, and a number of medals and busts.

== Life ==
He was born in Paderborn, Germany. He emigrated to the U.S., settling first in New York in 1883 and then Milwaukee in 1889.

While living in New York 1883-1889, Loeher was referenced several times in the New York Herald. The first, in 1883, refers to "Alois Loher, a Bavarian, a recent addition" in a piece about "Art and Artists on the Future of American Sculpture." In 1886, an article appeared in the New York Herald about the Statue of Germania, "a work just completed in the clay by Alois Loeher".

In 1889, Loeher moved to Wisconsin and became a resident of Milwaukee County, Wisconsin. His address in Milwaukee was listed as Plankinton House, a boarding house located on Grand Avenue, a well-to-do residential area populated with mansions and wealthy homes. As an indication of his place in society, he was listed in the 1890-91 Directory of Milwaukee Elite.

In Milwaukee Loeher's reputation grew as a sculptor and artist. In 1890, the Milwaukee Sentinel reported that Loeher completed a life-sized medallion portrait of Eugen D'Albert, a German composer and pianist who was visiting the city. Loeher also worked in bronze, doing portraits of local notables. Two examples of his work can be found at the University School of Milwaukee: a busts of Guido Pfister and Peter Engelmann, founders and benefactors of the school. In 1893 Loehr was invited to exhibit at the Chicago World's Fair (also known as the 1893 Columbian Exposition). He created a large decorative shield, three feet in diameter, filled with small bas-relief figures of American historical significance. The shield was placed in the fine arts building at the Columbian Exposition, next to Francis Edwin Elwell's sculpture of Dickens and Little Nell. The shield's location today, if it exists at all, is unknown to Smithsonian collectors and curators.

Aloys Loeher died in an accident in June 1904 in Silver Springs NY. He was 54 years old.
