= Clark Park =

Municipal park in West Philadelphia, Pennsylvania

- Clarence H. Clark Park
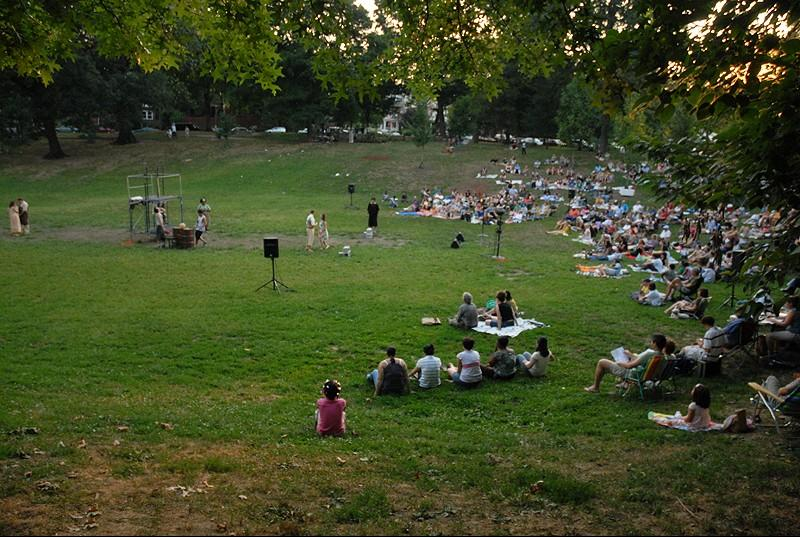
- An August 2007 performance of "Romeo and Juliet" by Shakespeare in Clark Park.
- Interactive map of Clark Park
- Location: West Philadelphia, Pennsylvania
- Coordinates: 39.94767°N 75.20983°W
- Area: 9.1 acres (3.7 ha)
- Created: 1895
- Operator: Philadelphia Parks & Recreation
- Status: Always open
- Website: www.friendsofclarkpark.org
- Clark Park
- U.S. Historic district – Contributing property
- Location within Philadelphia Location within Pennsylvania Location within the United States
- Location: Pennsylvania
- Coordinates: 39°57′1″N 75°12′45″W
- Area: 640 acres (259 ha)
- Architect: multiple
- Architectural style: Queen Anne, Colonial Revival, Classical Revival
- Part of: West Philadelphia Streetcar Suburb Historic District (ID97001669)
- Added to NRHP: February 5, 1998

Clark Park is a municipal park in the Spruce Hill section of West Philadelphia in Philadelphia, Pennsylvania. Its 9.1 acres (3.7 ha) are bordered by 43rd and 45th streets, and by Baltimore and Woodland Avenues.

The park was established in 1895 on land donated to the city by banker and West Philadelphia developer Clarence Howard Clark, and was known in its early decades as "Clarence H. Clark Park".

Today, the park has a basketball court, playground, an open field, and many paths. It holds a life-sized 1890 sculpture of Charles Dickens, one of just three known statues of the author. It is home to the Shakespeare in Clark Park theatre company. The park also hosts Philadelphia's largest year-round farmers' market, which runs once a week on Saturdays.

== History ==
=== 19th century ===
During the American Civil War, a small portion of the land that would later become Clark Park was occupied by the southern tip of the 16-acre grounds of Satterlee Hospital, one of the largest Union Army hospitals. Some 60,000 Union soldiers were treated at the medical facility, which was torn down after the war.

A prominent feature of the park is its "bowl", once a mill pond that powered a paper mill and another mill to the south. An ice house sat near its southern tip. The pond was fed by Mill Creek, which ran through a ravine between 42nd and 43rd Streets, was dammed above Woodland Avenue, and emptied into the Schuylkill River.

The mills were closed in the 1860s. As the area shifted from farmland to residential, over the next decades, the dam was removed, the creek was buried to make it easier to build houses, and the pond dried up.

In the 1890s, the land was used as a public dump.

In 1894, a proposal to take the land between 43rd and 44th streets and Baltimore and Chester Avenues for a municipal park was advanced to the City Council. Most of that land was owned by Clarence Howard Clark, a prominent banker and developer who lived a few blocks to the north. The city, which had laid out the streets surrounding the land, had issued a tax assessment of $16,925.25 ($629,818 today) for the work. Clark proposed a deal: he would donate the land for use as a park, and the city would forgive the assessment. Subsequently, a proposed ordinance was sent on April 19, by the council to the Committee on Municipal Government, which on May 10 recommended its passage in this form:

AN ORDINANCE

To place on the public plan for park purposes a plot of ground in the Twenty-seventh Ward, to be known as Clarence H. Clark park.

Section 1. The Select and Common Councils of the City of Philadelphia do ordain, That the Department of Public Works, Bureau of Surveys, be, and is hereby authorized and directed to place on the public plan for park purposes that certain lot of ground situate between Forty-third and Forty-fourth streets and Baltimore avenue and Chester avenue, to be called Clarence H. Clark Park : Provided, The owners of property first enter into an agreement satisfactory to the City Solicitor, to dedicate the same to the City on the payment of the amount paid by them for street improvement, sixteen thousand nine hundred and twenty-five (16,925) dollars and thirty-five (35) cents.

— Journal of the Common Council of the City of Philadelphia, Volume 1

The ordinance was passed on June 8, 1894, and the deal was done. In Clark's deed, he restricted the land to be used solely as a park, and he said that he wanted the park dedicated to children.

The first portion of the park was dedicated on January 18, 1895. In November 1898, the area south of Chester Avenue was added, giving the park today's 9.1-acre form.

==== Dickens and Little Nell ====
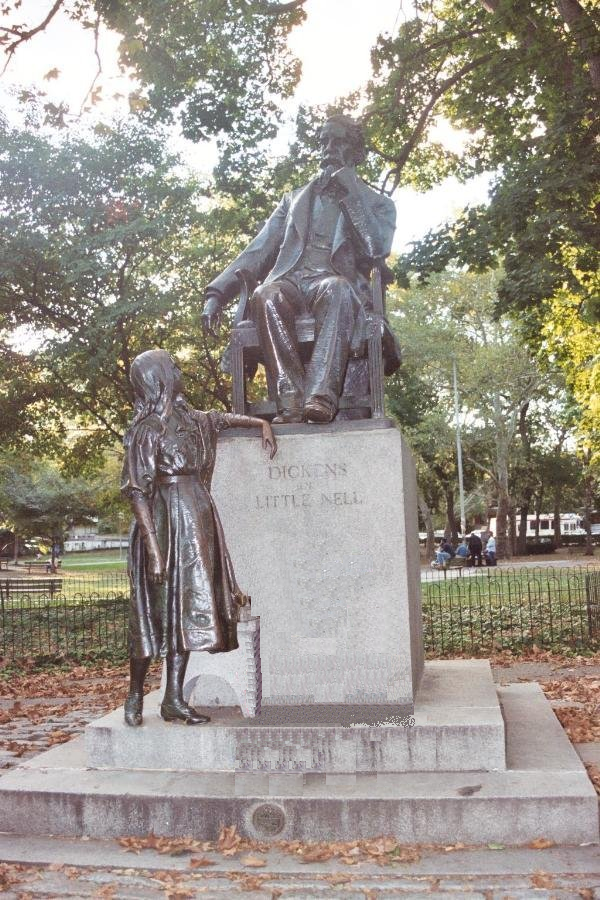
Dickens and Little Nell (1890), a statue of Charles Dickens by Francis Edwin Elwell

The Dickens sculpture, by New York City sculptor Francis Edwin Elwell, shows the 19th-century author and one of his characters, Nell Trent of the novel The Old Curiosity Shop. The work was commissioned in 1890 by Stilson Hutchins, who soon pulled out of the deal. Elwell nevertheless finished the sculpture, which won a gold medal in 1891 from the Art Club of Philadelphia and two gold medals at the 1893 World's Columbian Exposition. In 1896, the Fairmount Park Art Association (FPAA) bought the sculpture for $7,500 ($290,250 today); it was placed in Clark Park the following year. By 1908, the association was receiving, and rebuffing, requests to move it to a more prominent place in the city.

It was vandalized in November 1989, but restored.

=== 20th century ===
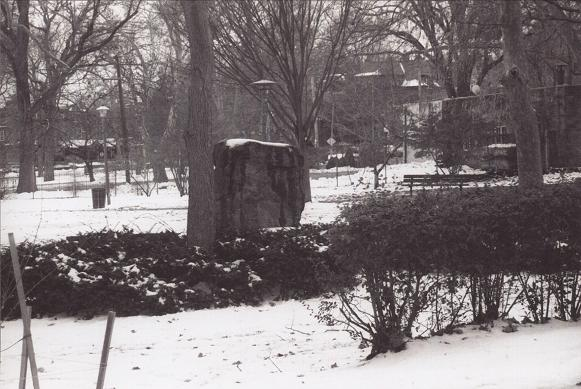
The Gettysburg Stone, a monument to the 60,000 Union soldiers treated at Satterlee Hospital, on whose southern tip the stone was placed in 1916.

On May 16, 1907, the city council of Philadelphia approved an ordinance "to place the care and maintenance of Kingsessing avenue between Forty-third and Forty-fifth streets in the Bureau of City Property" and lay it out as a macadam-topped "Park Drive." (This section of Kingsessing Avenue is today a stub road into the park and functions as a parking lot just south of the basketball court.)

In 1915, D. A. Conan, of 1345 Arch St., won a $5,000 contract to lay 3,000 yards of granolithic walkways in the park.

In June 1916, a large stone from Devil's Den at Gettysburg Battlefield was set up in the park to recall the Union soldiers treated on the site and the "services of the patriotic men and women" who cared for them. The stone sits near the park's northwestern corner, which was once the southern tip of the hospital grounds.

Around 1925, the first sub-station for the municipal fire alarm system was set up in Clark Park, allowing calls for service to be routed to local West Philadelphia fire stations instead of passing through the central station in City Hall downtown.

The park seems to have been the venue for a long-running Independence Day fireworks show; in 1937, for example, the "27th annual display of the Kingsessing Safe and Sane Fourth of July Association lasted an hour and 10 minutes".

In 1947, nearby residents complained to city officials about a stagnant pool of water that had gathered in the bowl of Clark Park and become fetid over the course of four months. A city official conceded that the situation was "deplorable" but said nothing could be done because the city lacked money to fill in the hole. Still, Eagles star running back Steve Van Buren continued to take weekly walks with his dog there.

In 1950, the park hosted the neighborhood's qualification round of the annual Metropolitan Philadelphia Marbles Tournament, which attracted a record 9,148 boys and girls.

In June 1961, the city spent $40,000 ($430,958 today) on park improvements, adding a basketball court, shuffleboard court, checkers tables, a tot-lot, two drinking fountains and general landscaping.

The Friends of Clark Park (FOCP), a nonprofit volunteer organization, was founded in 1973 to help maintain the park. Yet the 1970s and '80s saw park maintenance steadily decline; no major capital projects were completed except for normal repairs and the installation of playground equipment in the early 1980s. In November 1989, the figure of Little Nell was torn from its pedestal and thrown face-down by vandals. FOCP raised money to do the repairs, which were overseen by the Fairmount Park Art Association, and requested additional lighting to illuminate the sculpture.

By 1998, "Trash and broken glass surrounded the Dickens statue and littered the park. More than once, the neighbors fought the city just to get the grass cut. Lacking lights, the park was off-limits after dusk except to drug dealers and their prey," wrote Judith Rodin, the president of the nearby University of Pennsylvania, which was heavily involved in gentrification efforts in the neighborhood.

That same year, regional farmers began offering produce and other products at the Clark Park Farmers' Market.

=== 21st century ===
In 2000, FOCP, the Recreation department, and the non-profit University City District organization agreed to raise private maintenance funds to supplement municipal efforts. The agreement launched an annual “Party for the Park” fundraiser, which helps underwrite the cost of landscape maintenance and fund a small, but growing maintenance endowment. Between 2000 and 2006, the trio raised more than $300,000.

The partners sought and received $55,000 from the William Penn Foundation to develop a master plan for Clark Park, which was delivered in 2001 after a nine-month effort by community-based steering committee and landscape architects. Among its fruits: a comprehensive assessment of the park's 305 trees by the Morris Arboretum; two new playgrounds, one of which was built with private funds; and plans to rebuild the basketball court. The master plan also calls for a central plaza where chess players now gather around the flagpole, improvements to the Dickens and Gettysburg Stone areas, and sidewalk and lighting renovations. The plan envisions replacing the parking lot next to the basketball court with green space for the University of the Sciences in Philadelphia, which leases the space and the adjacent Rosenberger Hall.

Major renovations to the northern section of the park, dubbed Park A, began on September 7, 2010: improvements to lighting, green areas, paved paths, and drainage. The work was slated to finish in November; it was actually completed on June 16, 2011.

== Park events ==
The farmers’ market operates at 43rd Street and Baltimore, offering produce and other products from regional farms once or twice a week. From May through November, the market is open on Thursdays (3 to 7 p.m.) and Saturdays (10 a.m. to 2 p.m.); the rest of the year, on Saturdays (10 a.m. to 1 p.m.). The market is run by a pair of non-profit organizations: The Food Trust and University City District. Since 2008, the vendors have been equipped with wireless Electronic Benefit Transfer devices set up by the U.S. Department of Agriculture that allow customers to pay with credit and debit cards and food stamps.

On February 7, fans of Charles Dickens, led by the Philadelphia branch of the Dickens Fellowship and Friends of Clark Park, meet at the statue to celebrate the writer's birthday.

== Gallery ==
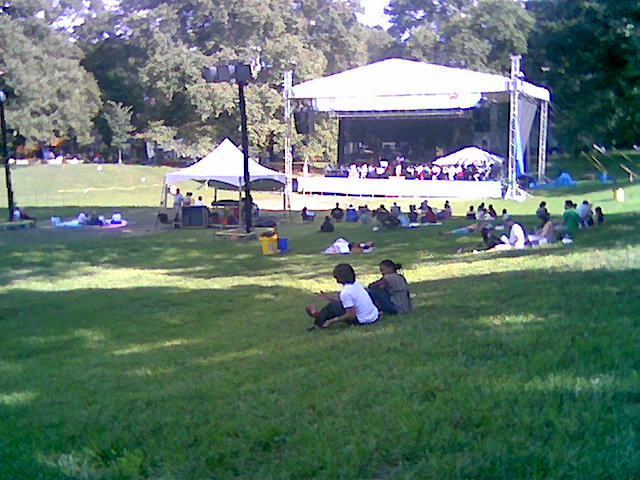
Philadelphia Orchestra

== See also ==
- List of parks in Philadelphia
- University City
- USIP
