= Katherine M. Cohen =

American sculptor

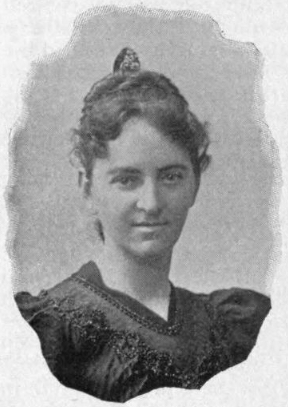
- Born: Katherine Myrtilla Cohen; March 18, 1859; Philadelphia, Pennsylvania, US
- Died: December 14, 1914 (aged 55); Philadelphia, Pennsylvania, US
- Education: Pennsylvania Academy of Fine Arts
- Occupation: Sculptor

Katherine Myrtilla Cohen (March 18, 1859 – December 14, 1914) was an American sculptor.

== Biography ==
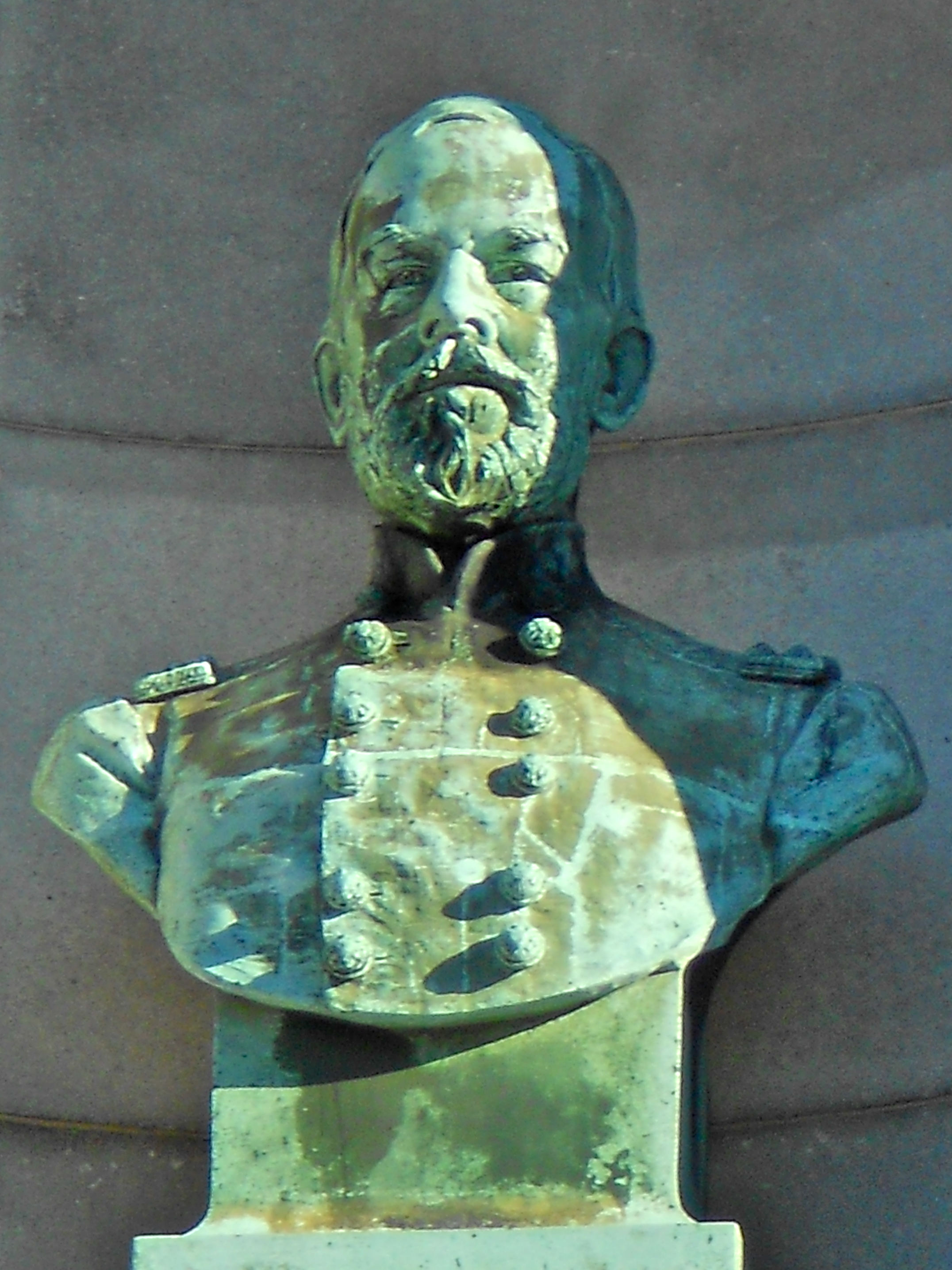
Bust of General James Beaver of Perry County, Pennsylvania, by Katherine M. Cohen

Cohen was born in Philadelphia, Pennsylvania, on March 18, 1859, to Henry Cohen, originally from London, and Matilda (Samuel) Cohen, originally from Liverpool.

She received elite-level training in art, studying first at the Pennsylvania Academy of Fine Arts under painter Thomas Eakins, and later working at the Art Students League in New York City as an assistant in the studio of sculptor Augustus Saint-Gaudens. She opened her own studio in Philadelphia in 1884. Three years later, she began working for sculptors Denys Puech and Marius Jean Antonin Mercié in Paris, where she was elected an honorary member of the American Art Association.

Although few Jews were sculptors in nineteenth-century America, in part due to the biblical prohibition against creating graven images, Katherine Cohen, a sculptor from Philadelphia with elite academic training, exhibited figurative works, often of Jewish subjects, in an era when women and Jews achieved slight renown in the art world.

— Michele Siegel

Cohen exhibited a work, Bust of Harry Souther at the Columbian Exposition in Chicago, Illinois in 1893.

Cohen died at her home in Philadelphia on December 14, 1914.
