= Dickens and Little Nell (Elwell) =

Sculpture by Francis Edwin Elwell

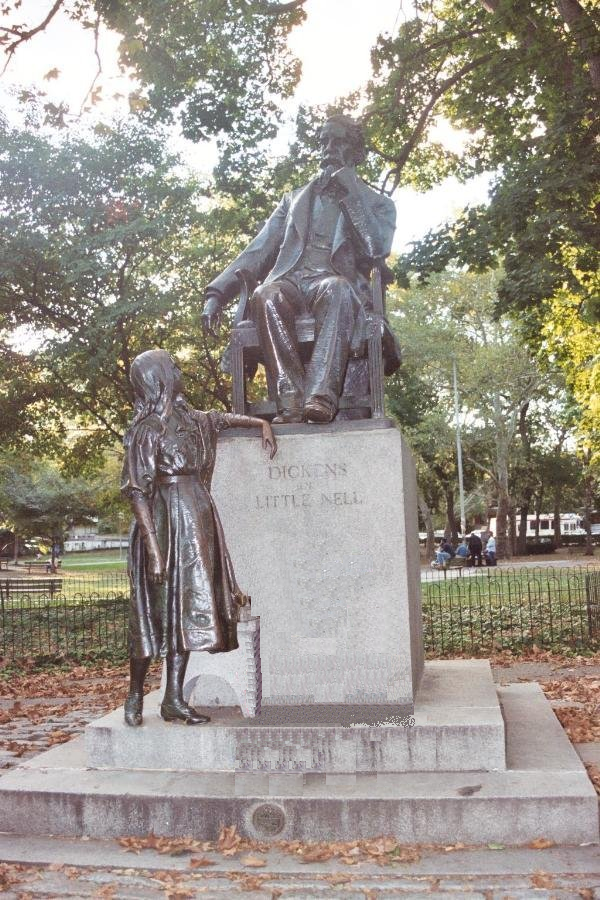
- Artist: Francis Edwin Elwell
- Year: 1890
- Type: Bronze
- Location: Philadelphia, United States; 39.94860°N 75.20944°W
- Owner: City of Philadelphia

Philadelphia Register of Historic Places

Dickens and Little Nell is a bronze sculpture by Francis Edwin Elwell that stands in Clark Park in the Spruce Hill neighborhood of Philadelphia. The sculpture depicts the 19th-century British author Charles Dickens and Nell Trent, a character from his 1840–41 novel The Old Curiosity Shop. The grouping was one of the most celebrated American sculptural works of the late 19th century.

It is one of just three known statues of Dickens, who said he wanted no such representations.

== History ==
The sculpture was commissioned in 1890 by The Washington Post founder Stilson Hutchins, who wanted it placed in London but subsequently backed out of the deal. Elwell, a sculptor based in New York City, completed the work anyway and had it cast by the Bureau Brothers Foundry in Philadelphia, where it won a gold medal from the Art Club of Philadelphia in 1891. The next year, he shipped it to London and put it on display in hopes of finding a buyer, but was unsuccessful, largely because Dickens's will forbade any "monument, memorial or testimonial, whatever. I rest my claims to remembrance on my published works and to the remembrance of my friends upon their experiences of me."

So Elwell shipped the work back across the Atlantic, and on to Chicago, where it won two gold medals at the World's Columbian Exposition of 1893. The New York Times wrote, "Among the art exhibits of this country at the World's Fair, probably no particular example has attracted more popular interest than the sculptural memorial to Charles Dickens, the work of Mr. F. Edwin Elwell, a young artist". But the work failed to find a buyer immediately, and Elwell had it sent back halfway across the country to a Philadelphia warehouse.

In 1896, the Fairmount Park Art Association (now the Association for Public Art) opened negotiations to buy the work and keep it in Philadelphia, perhaps because "Dickens was twice a visitor here, in 1842 and again 1867, and garnered a following of almost rock star proportions." In 1900, FPAA bought the sculpture for $7,500 ($290,250 today). George G. Pierele, chief of the Bureau of City Property, reportedly pressed for its installation in Clark Park. The following year, it was placed in the park, near the intersection of South 43rd Street and Baltimore Avenue. This move may have been influenced by the park's namesake, financier Clarence H. Clark, a member of the FPAA artworks committee.

The sculpture was initially placed on a temporary pedestal, and funds were soon raised to purchase a permanent one. Made of Woodstock granite by W.R. Martin of Philadelphia and installed in 1902, the pedestal included three steps and a die of 4'8" by 3'4" by 4'2".

By 1908, the association was receiving, and rebuffing, requests to move it to a more prominent place in the city.

In 1911, the sculpture was mentioned in the Encyclopædia Britannica as one of the city's notable artworks.

Lorado Taft wrote in his influential 1903 book The History of American Sculpture:

In his "Dickens and Little Nell" the sculptor has given us that rare thing,—a portrait statue which makes an emotional appeal. To be sure, its dramatic power is due to a secondary figure, as is the case in Mr. French's "Gallaudet," but the use of such a figure is legitimate when it detracts nothing from the effect of the principal, but rather enhances it, and when it is in itself as charming in conception as is Mr. Elwell's "Little Nell."

The sculpture was vandalized in November 1989, but restored.

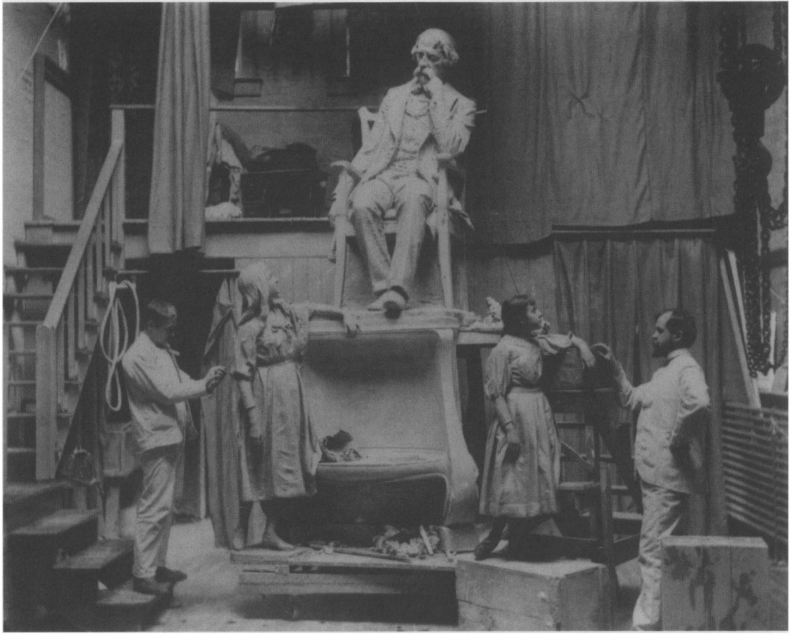
Elwell, right, and a model in his studio with Dickens and Little Nell in 1890

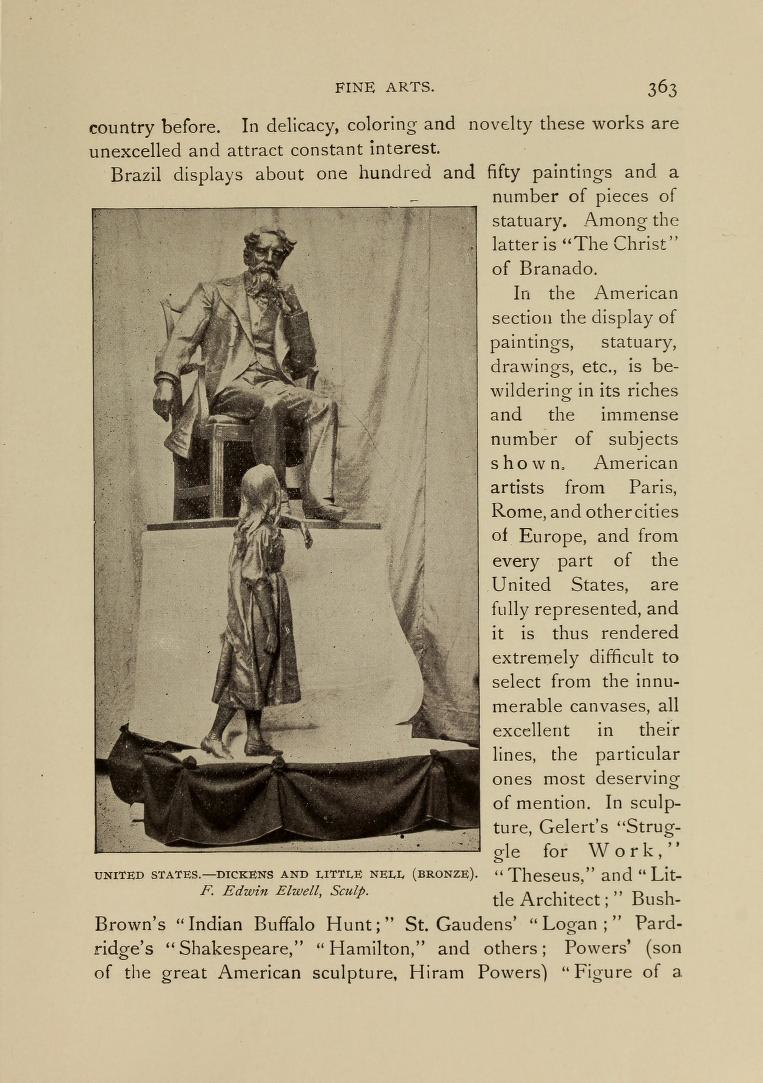
Dickens and Little Nell at the Columbian Exposition, Chicago, 1893

== Other statues to Dickens ==
There are two other known statues to Charles Dickens in the world. One is located in his birth city of Portsmouth, England, and the other in Sydney, Australia.

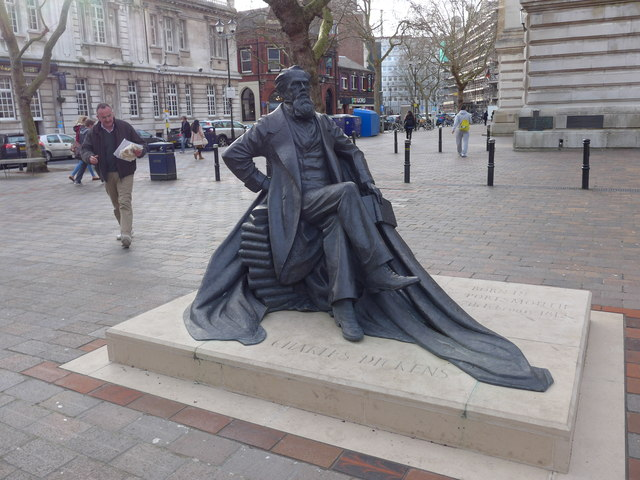
Statue of Dickens in Portsmouth, England.

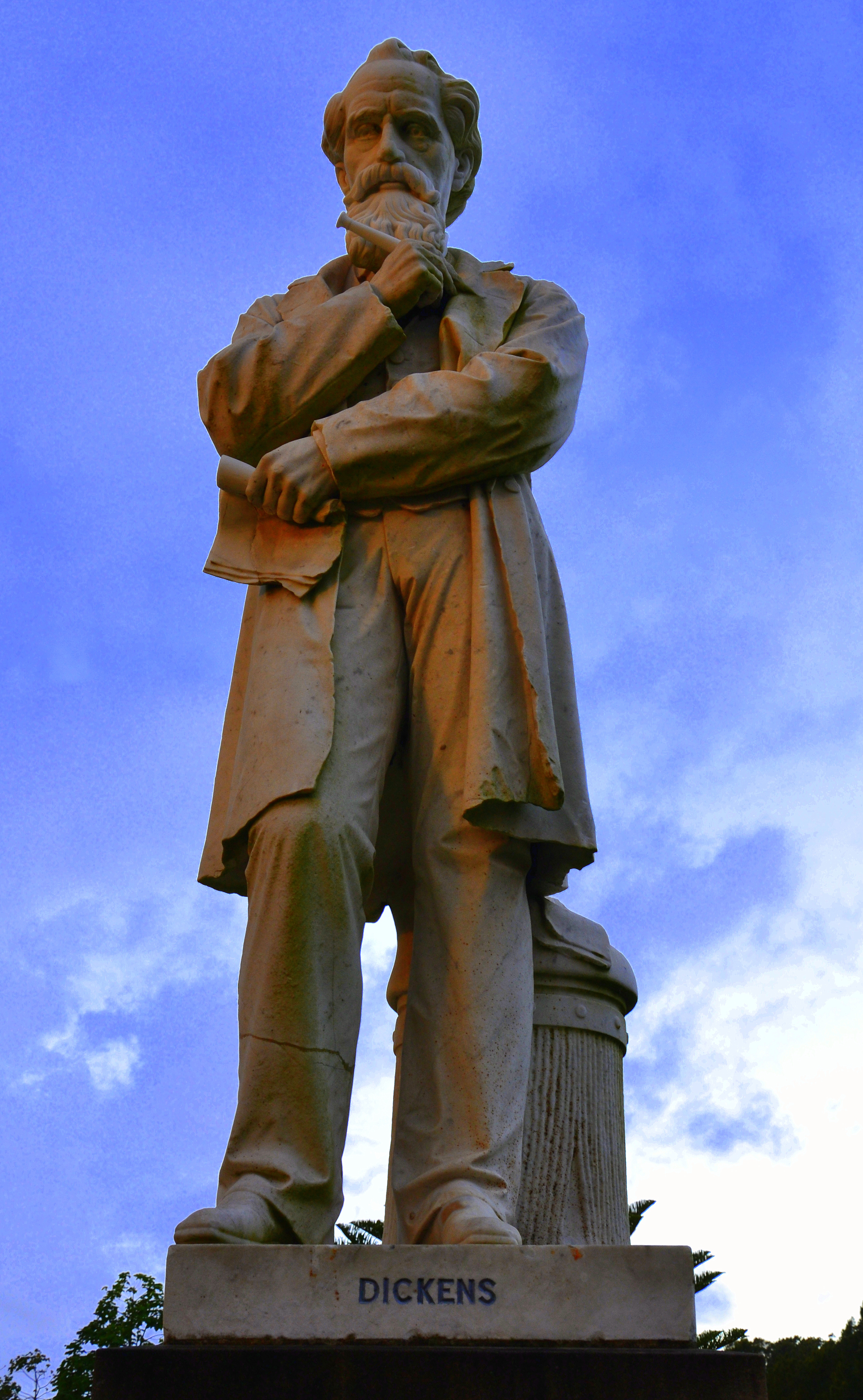
Statue of Dickens in Sydney, Australia.

== See also ==
- List of public art in Philadelphia
