= Francis Edwin Elwell =

American sculptor (1858–1922)

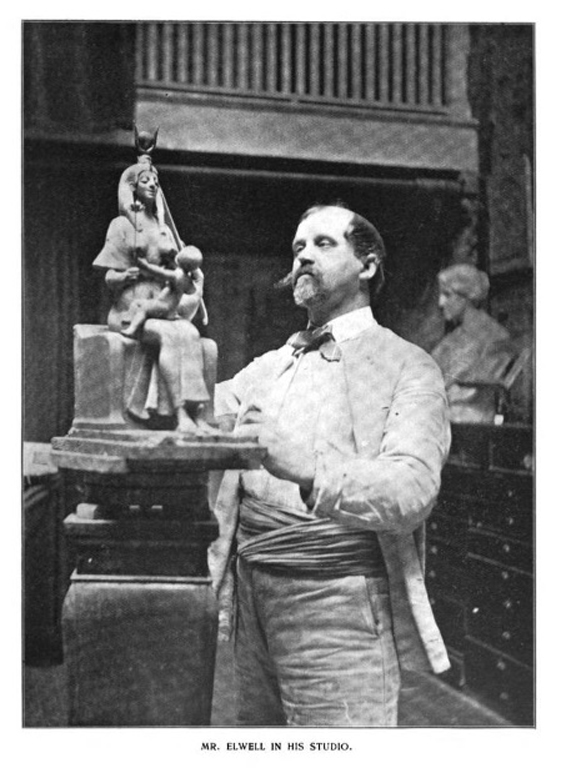
- Francis Elwell with his clay model of Isis Instructing Horus, c. 1899
- Born: June 15, 1858; Concord, Massachusetts
- Died: January 23, 1922 (aged 63); Darien, Connecticut
- Other name: Frank Edwin Elwell
- Occupations: sculptor, teacher, author
- Notable work: Dickens and Little Nell

Francis Edwin Elwell (June 15, 1858 – January 23, 1922) was an American sculptor, teacher, and author. Elwell established an early reputation as a sculptor of portrait busts, but also became known for major works, funereal and military monuments, and architectural sculptures. His most famous work is likely Dickens and Little Nell (1890).

He lectured on art at Harvard University, and taught modeling at the National Academy of Design and the Art Students League of New York. He served as Curator of Sculpture at the Metropolitan Museum of Art until he was ousted in 1905, and wrote one of the first, though unpublished, histories of American sculpture.

== Biography ==
=== Early life ===
Elwell was the son and only child of John Wesley Elwell and Clara Farrar, of Concord, Massachusetts. He was orphaned at age 4, and raised by his maternal grandparents, Elisha Jones Farrar and Elizabeth Chase Barnay. His grandfather was a blacksmith, whom Elwell assisted at the forge. The Farrars were friendly with several illustrious neighbors: Ralph Waldo Emerson, Henry David Thoreau, and the Alcott family.

He attended Concord public schools, and received his first art instruction privately from Abigail May Alcott, who had also been an early teacher of sculptor Daniel Chester French. Her sister, writer Louisa May Alcott, took an interest in both students.

As a teenager, Elwell assisted French (eight years his senior) in the sculptor's Concord studio, and later shared a studio with him in New York City. Elwell studied at the school of the Boston Museum of Fine Arts. With financial backing from French, the Alcotts, and other Boston patrons, Elwell traveled to Paris in 1881. Following a recommendation from the U.S. Minister to France, Levi P. Morton, he was admitted to the École des Beaux-Arts in May 1882. He matriculated after a year, and studied privately in the studio of his École teacher, Alexandre Falguière. Elwell then studied architecture at the Royal Art School in Ghent, Belgium, and was awarded a silver medal by King Leopold in 1884.

Elwell married fellow American art student Molina Mary Hilbreth in Paris. They returned to Massachusetts in 1885, and their twin sons were born there in 1886.

=== Career ===
For several years, Elwell lectured on art at Harvard University. He taught modeling at the school of the National Academy of Design, 1886–1887, then at the Art Students League of New York. He found early success in modeling and carving portrait busts and minor works.

His first major commission came in 1886 from Mrs. Frederik Hendrik Pont, a Dutch philanthropist, for a sculpture to mark her late husband's grave. The widow chose Elwell on recommendations by Dutch painter Hendrik Dirk Kruseman van Elten and American sculptor John Quincy Adams Ward. Carved in marble, Death of Strength (1888) depicted a dying lion watched over by an angel. It was placed in the churchyard of St. Nicholaaskerk, in Edam, Netherlands, becoming "the first American-made statue to be installed on European soil."

He was also a contributor to The Arena, a Progressive era magazine.

=== Dickens and Little Nell ===
Elwell's most celebrated work is likely his 1891 sculptural grouping of Charles Dickens and Nell Trent, a character from the author's 1840-41 novel The Old Curiosity Shop. It won a gold medal from the Art Club of Philadelphia in 1891 and two gold medals at the World's Columbian Exposition of 1893. The New York Times wrote, "Among the art exhibits of this country at the World's Fair, probably no particular example has attracted more popular interest than the sculptural memorial to Charles Dickens, the work of Mr. F. Edwin Elwell, a young artist".

Lorado Taft wrote in his 1903 book The History of American Sculpture:

In his "Dickens and Little Nell" the sculptor has given us that rare thing,—a portrait statue which makes an emotional appeal. To be sure, its dramatic power is due to a secondary figure, as is the case in Mr. French's "Gallaudet," but the use of such a figure is legitimate when it detracts nothing from the effect of the principal, but rather enhances it, and when it is in itself as charming in conception as is Mr. Elwell's "Little Nell."

=== 1901 Pan-American Exposition ===
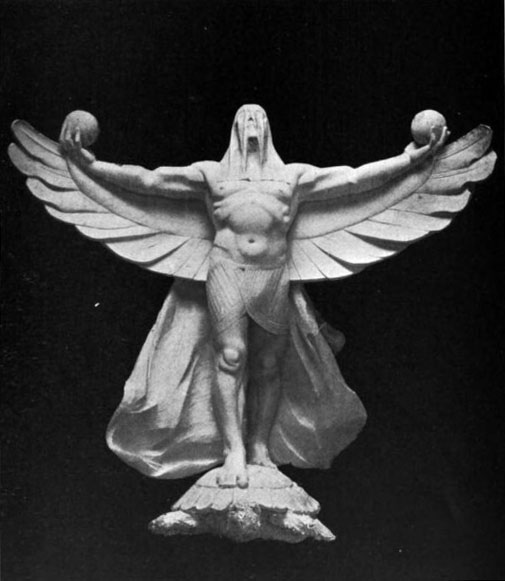
Kronos (1901), Fountain sculpture for the Pan-American Exposition, Buffalo, New York.

Elwell created three heroic-sized sculptures for the 1901 Pan-American Exposition in Buffalo, New York. Kronos and Ceres faced each other across the pool of the West Esplanade Fountain; and Intelligence had the place of honor before the south portico of the New York State Building (now the Albright-Knox Art Gallery). Elwell exhibited two bronzes in the Art Gallery, Egypt Awakening and Dancing Girl, and was awarded a bronze medal for them.

His twin sons entered Harvard University in 1906, and Elwell donated his plaster model of Kronos:

At the reception to Freshmen in the Union last night, a statue of "Kronos," designed by F. E. Elwell, and presented to the Union by A. F. Elwell '10 and S. B. Elwell '10, was unveiled in the southwest corner of the Living Room. Mr. W. C. Lane '81, Librarian of the University, announced the gift and briefly described its significance.
The statue is a plaster model of a colossal figure exhibited at the Pan-American Exposition at Buffalo in 1901. Kronos is represented with out-stretched wings, symbolic of the apparently swift flight of time, but standing on the back of a turtle, as significant of its slow progress. The face is covered with a veil, emblematic of mystery.

=== Personal ===
On October 30, 1882, Elwell and Molina Mary Hildreth (1847-1932), of Cambridge, Massachusetts, were married in Paris. They returned to the United States in 1885, and the following year she bore twin sons: Alcott Farrar Elwell (1886-1962) and Stanley Bruce Elwell (1886-1936). Louisa May Alcott was godmother to Alcott Elwell.

Elwell presented a bust of Louisa May Alcott to the University of Kansas in 1900:

Miss Alcott was so much my friend, and had so much to do in forming my character that I would have been most ungrateful had I not sought to honor her memory when the opportunity was afforded, as it came in an invitation to furnish a bust for the University of Kansas. … [Presented] as a loving tribute to the memory of a grand woman whose friendship was so helpful, and whose writings have tended to ennoble and elevate the lives of thousands of American boys and girls.

Frank and Molina Elwell separated around 1908, and their 1911 divorce was highly publicized.

Elwell lived for a time in Orange, New Jersey, and then for many years lived and sculpted at 12 Hudson Place in Weehawken, New Jersey, overlooking the Hudson River.

He moved to Darien, Connecticut, in 1920. Elwell died there on January 23, 1922, while waiting for a streetcar. The city flew its flags at half-mast.

== Selected works ==
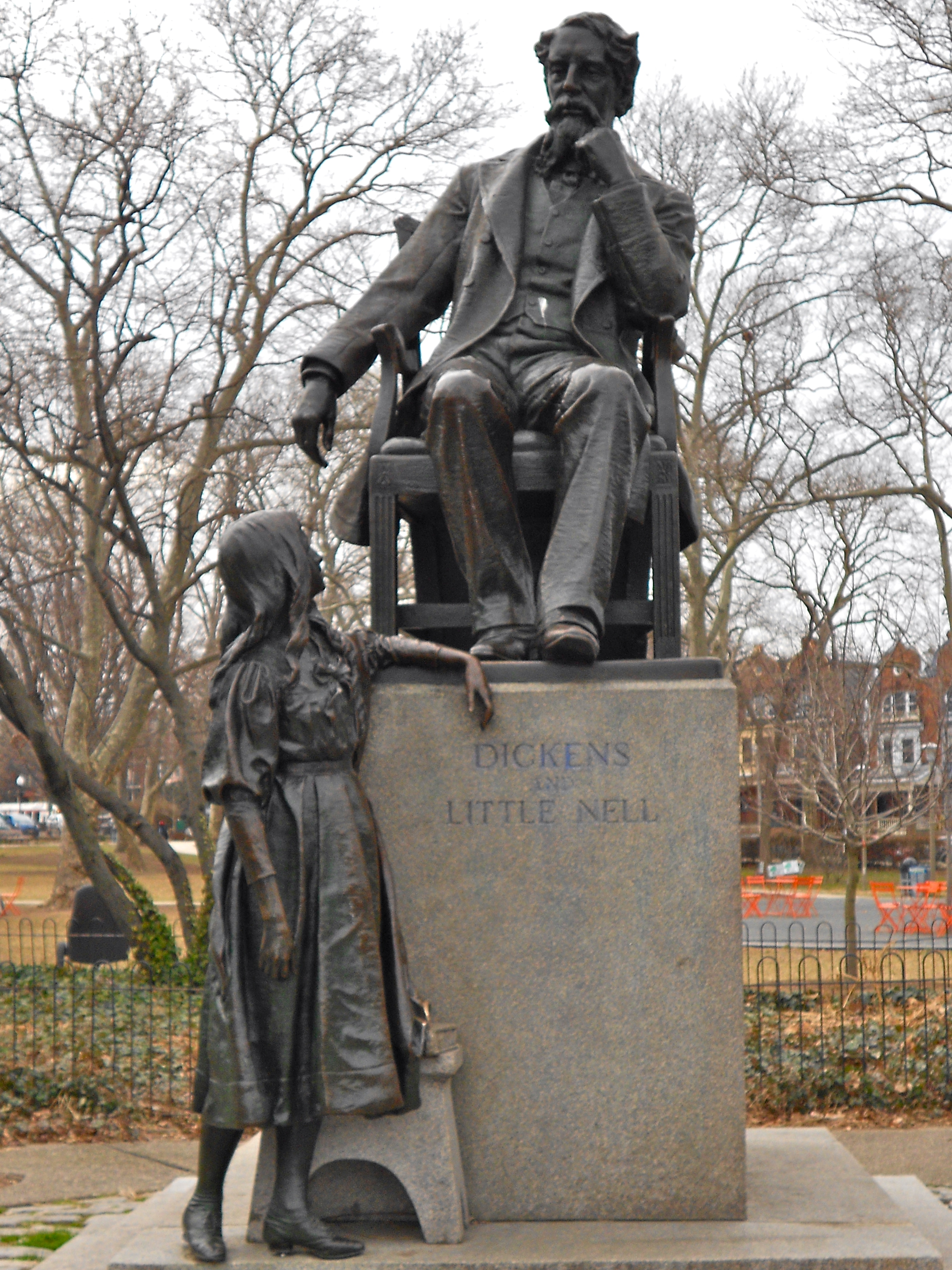
Dickens and Little Nell (1890), Clark Park, West Philadelphia, PA

=== Sculptures ===
- Aqua Viva (Water Carrier) (bronze, 1884), height: 48 in (120 cm), Metropolitan Museum of Art, Manhattan, New York City.
- Nathan Hale (clay, 1889), unlocated. Elwell's unsuccessful entry in an 1889 sculpture competition.
- Dickens and Little Nell (bronze, 1890), Dickens: 6.75 ft (2.06 m), Overall: 12.67 ft (3.86 m), Clark Park, West Philadelphia, Pennsylvania. Awarded the 1891 gold medal of the Philadelphia Art Club; awarded a gold medal at the 1893 World’s Columbian Exposition; purchased by the Fairmount Park Art Association.
- Diana and the Lion (Intellect Dominating Force) (marble, 1893), Fabyan Villa, Geneva, Illinois. Exhibited at the 1893 World's Columbian Exposition in Chicago. Ex collection: Art Institute of Chicago. A life-sized standing female nude resting her hand on the head of a seated lion.
- Priestess of Isis (Egypt Awaking) (bronze, c.1896), unlocated. Bought by M. Gabriel Goupillat at the Paris Salon of 1896.
- The Goddess of Fire (c.1897), unlocated.
- Isis Instructing Horus (The Origin of Religion) (1898), unlocated.
- The Orchid (Dancing Girl) (1898), unlocated. Owned by Theodore B. Starr, New York City.
- When Sleep Comes Down (by 1898), unlocated. A shrouded standing female figure.
- Dawn (by 1898), unlocated.
- Strength and Love (by 1898), unlocated.
- Andrew McMillan Memorial (c.1904), Utica Public Library, Utica, New York.
- The Dispatch Rider of the American Revolution (bronze, 1907), Sculpture: 9 ft (2.7 m), Overall: 12 ft (3.7 m), First Presbyterian Church of Orange, Orange, New Jersey.
- Abraham Lincoln (bronze, 1911), Sculpture: 8 ft (2.4 m), Overall: 15.5 ft (4.7 m), East Orange City Hall Plaza, East Orange, New Jersey.
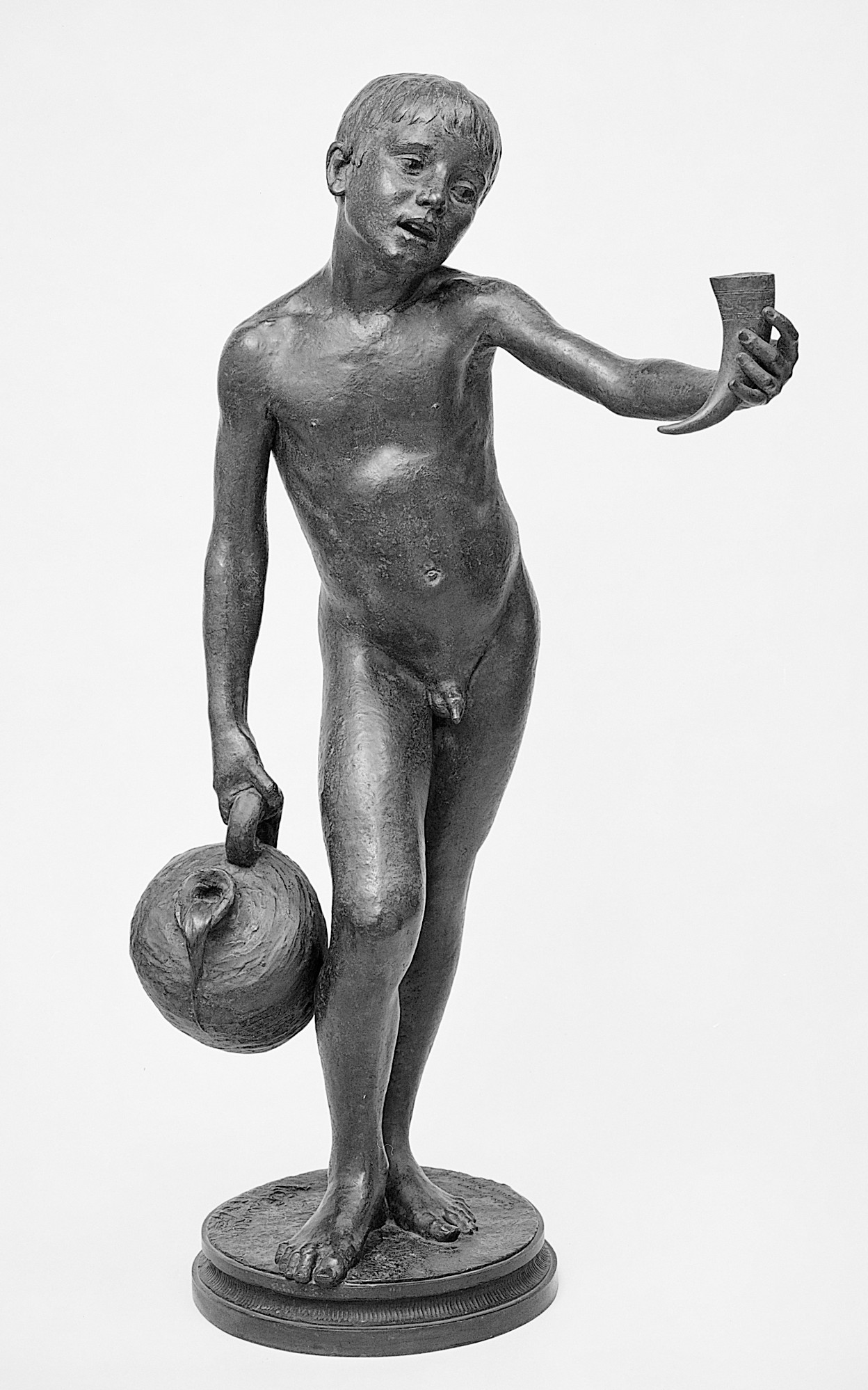
Aqua Viva (1884), Metropolitan Museum of Art

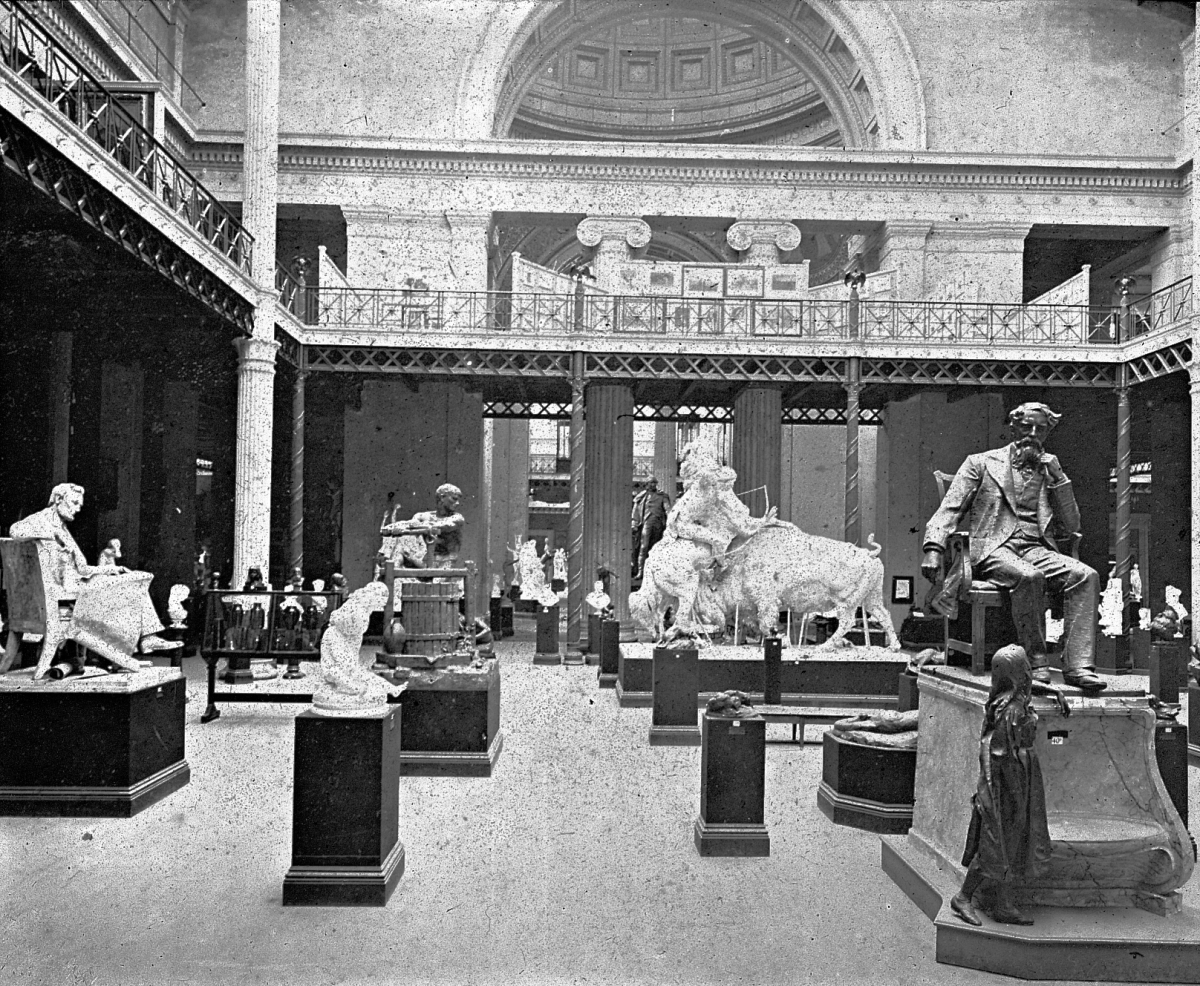
Dickens and Little Nell (right), at the 1893 World's Columbian Exposition, Chicago

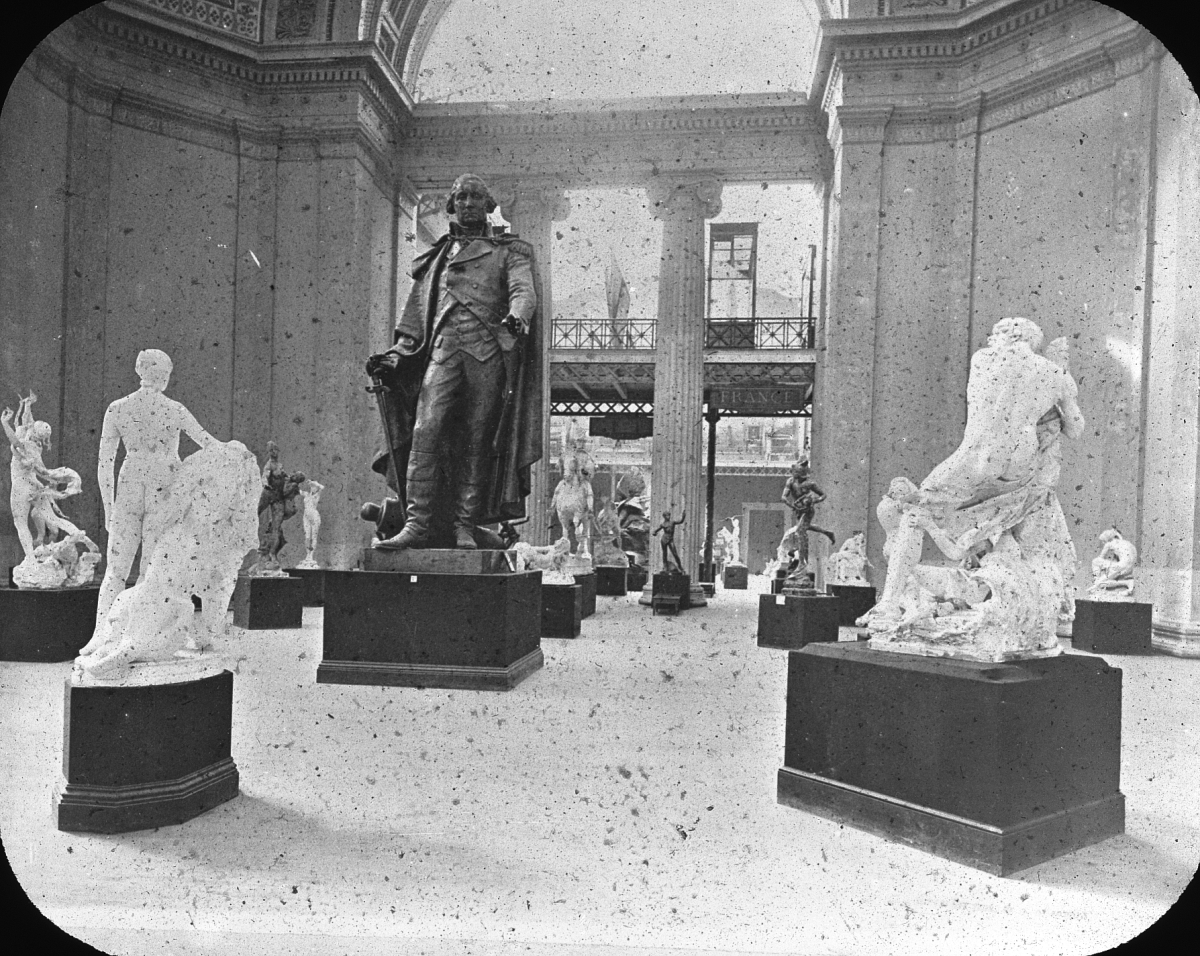
Diana and the Lion (left), at the 1893 World's Columbian Exposition, Chicago

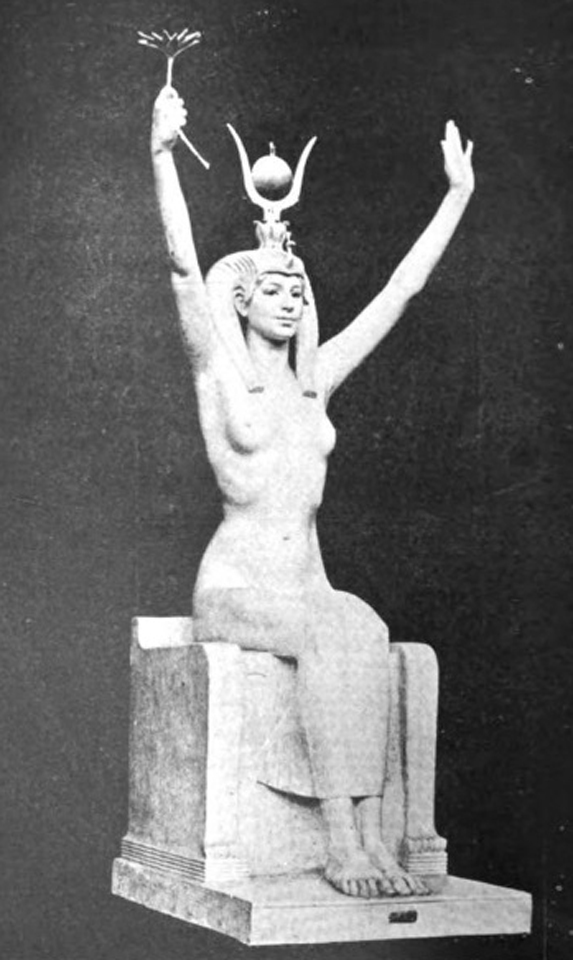
Egypt Awaking (1896), unlocated

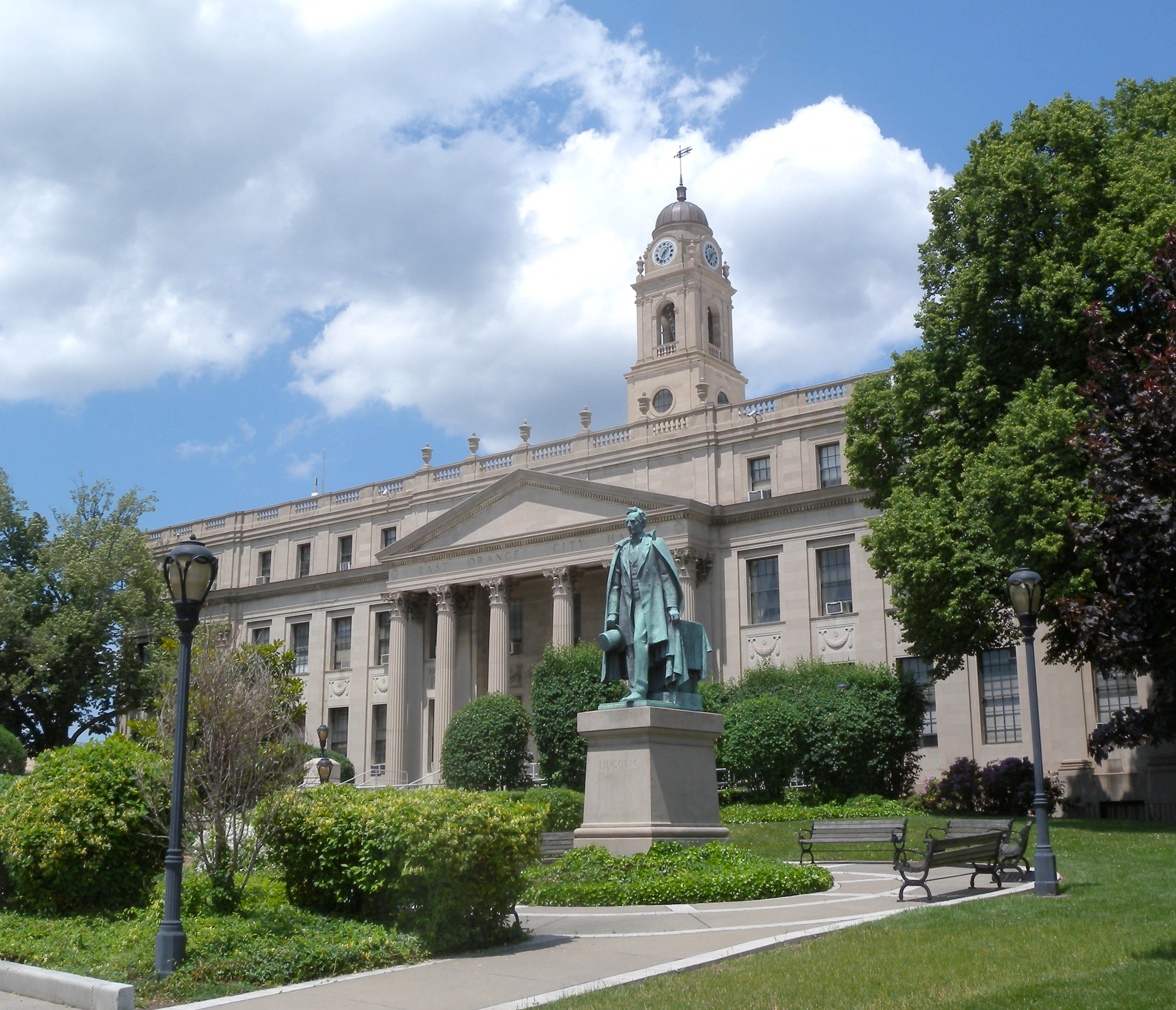
Abraham Lincoln (1911), City Hall, East Orange, NJ

=== Portrait busts ===
- Bust of Hippolyte Le Roy (1882), exhibited at Paris Salon of 1883. Le Roy had been Elwell's instructor at the Royal Art School, Ghent, Belgium.
- Bust of a Woman (1887), height: 25.5 in (65 cm), High Museum of Art, Atlanta, Georgia.
- Bust of Miss Edna Monroe (by 1889), Cambridge, Massachusetts.
- Bust of Master Jackson (by 1889), Athens, Georgia.
- Serious Thought (by 1889), unlocated. Bust of a child.
- Nine bas-relief portrait busts of eminent men (by 1889), Yale University, New Haven, Connecticut.
- Bust of Simeon Baldwin Chittenden (marble, 1890), height: 34.5 in (88 cm), Yale Divinity School Library, New Haven, Connecticut.
- Bust of Louisa May Alcott (plaster, 1891), height: 28.875 in (73.34 cm), Orchard House, Concord, Massachusetts
  - Elwell donated a plaster cast to the University of Kansas, Lawrence, in 1900.
  - A bronze cast is at the Concord Free Public Library, Concord, Massachusetts
  - A 1967 bronze cast is at the National Portrait Gallery, Washington, D.C.
- Bust of Vice President Levi P. Morton (marble, 1891), height: 35 in (89 cm), United States Senate Art Collection. Morton had recommended Elwell's admittance to the École des Beaux-Arts a decade earlier.
- Bust of Reverend Robert Collyer (marble, by 1899), unlocated.
- Bust of Peter Esselmont, Lord Provost of Aberdeen (marble, by 1899), Town Hall Library, Aberdeen, Scotland.
- Bust of John Ward Dunsmore (1900), height: 20.25 in (51.4 cm), New York Historical Society, Manhattan, New York City.
- Bust of Vice President Garret A. Hobart (marble, 1901), height: 37 in (94 cm), United States Senate Art Collection.
- Bust of Elihu Yale (1901), Yale Club of New York City.

==== Portrait busts of unknown date ====
- Bust of Otto Grundmann (plaster), Museum of Fine Arts, Boston. Grundmann had been Elwell's teacher at the school of the Museum of Fine Arts, Boston.
- Head of Frank B. Sanborn (marble), Kansas State Historical Society, Topeka, Kansas.
- Bust of James E. Mooney, height: 29.125 in (73.98 cm), Cincinnati Art Museum, Cincinnati, Ohio.
- Bust of Robert Miller Walmsley (marble), Tulane University, New Orleans, Louisiana.
- Bust of Morris Patten, unlocated.
- Bust of Marion Elwell, unlocated.
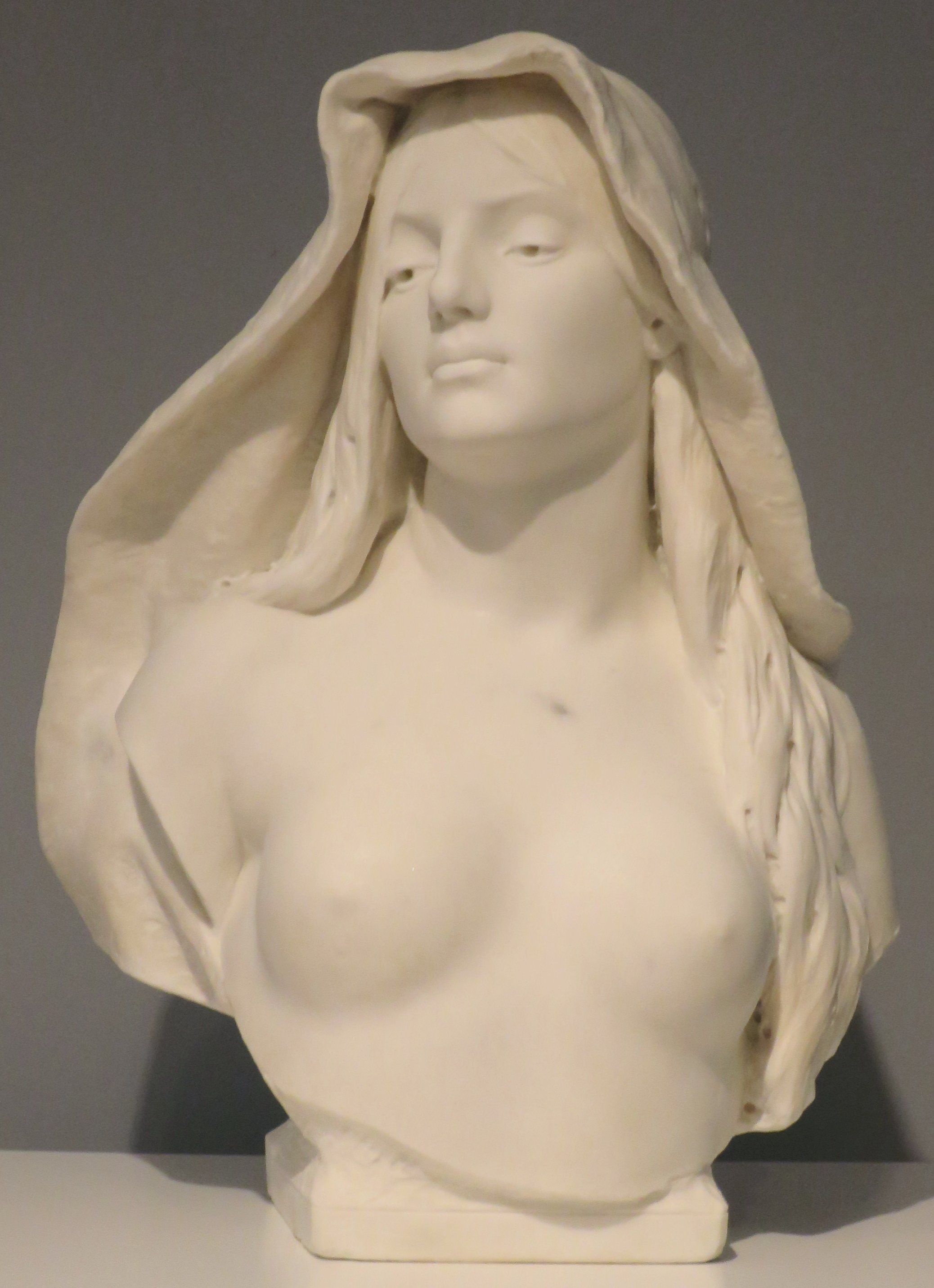
Bust of a Woman (1887), High Museum of Art

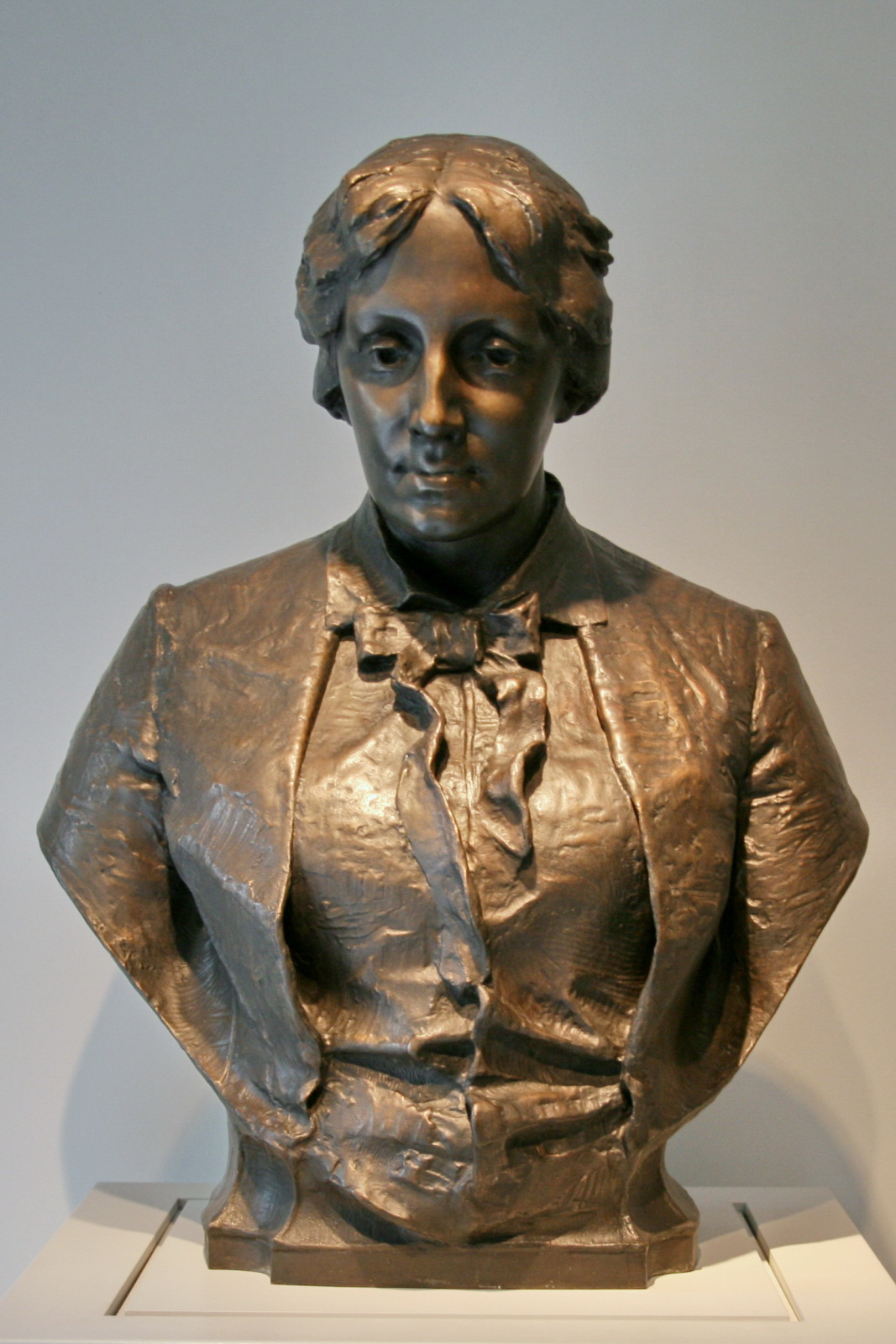
Louisa May Alcott (1891, this cast 1967), National Portrait Gallery

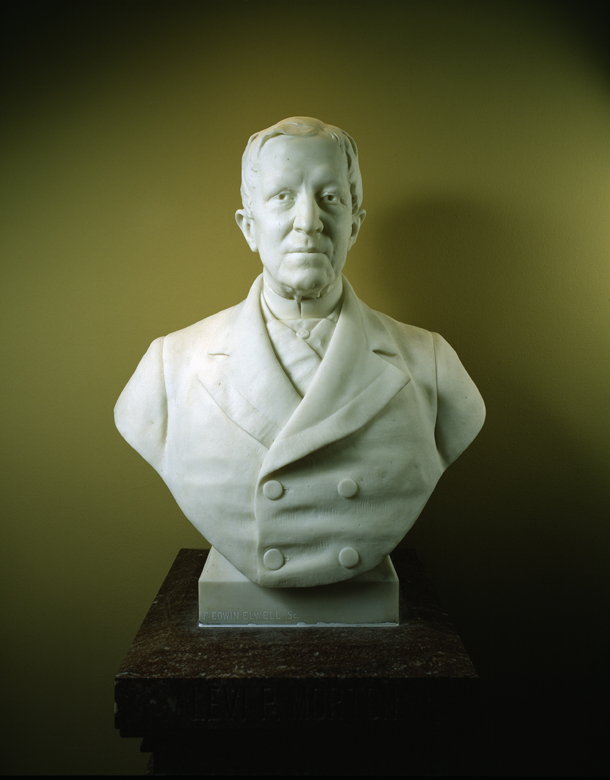
Vice President Levi P. Morton (1891), U.S. Capitol

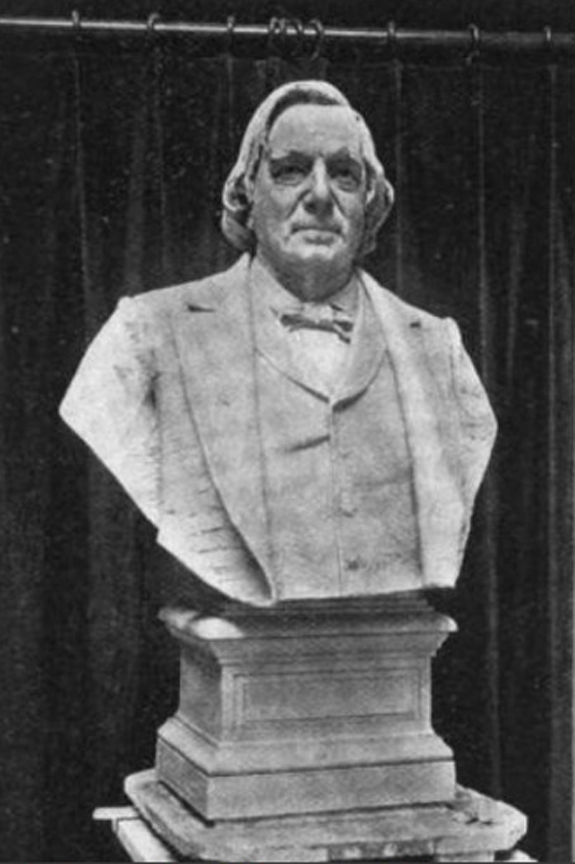
Reverend Robert Collyer (by 1899), unlocated

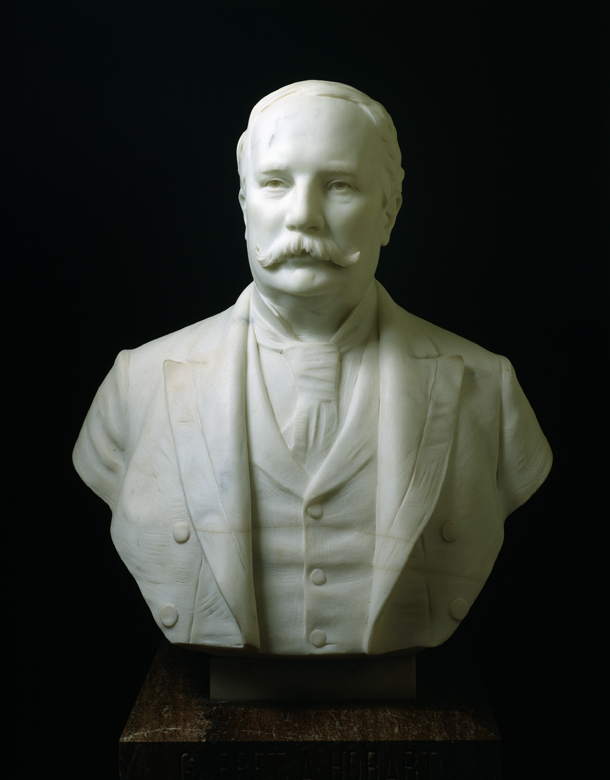
Vice President Garret A. Hobart (1901), U.S. Capitol

=== Funereal monuments ===
- Death of Strength, (1888), Frederik Hendrik Pont tomb, St. Nicholaaskerk churchyard, Edam, Netherlands
- Relief bust of Edwin Booth (bronze, 1895), Overall: 60 in (150 cm), Edwin Booth Monument, Mount Auburn Cemetery, Cambridge, Massachusetts, Stanford White, architect
- The New Life (bronze, 1899), Bonney Memorial, Lowell Cemetery, Lowell, Massachusetts, Henry Bacon, architect.
  - Plaster version, ex collection: Pennsylvania Academy of the Fine Arts.
- General Luigi Palma di Cesnola Monument (c.1904), Kensico Cemetery, Valhalla, New York.
- The Genius of Memory (1916), Lowell Cemetery, Lowell, Massachusetts, Henry Bacon, architect.
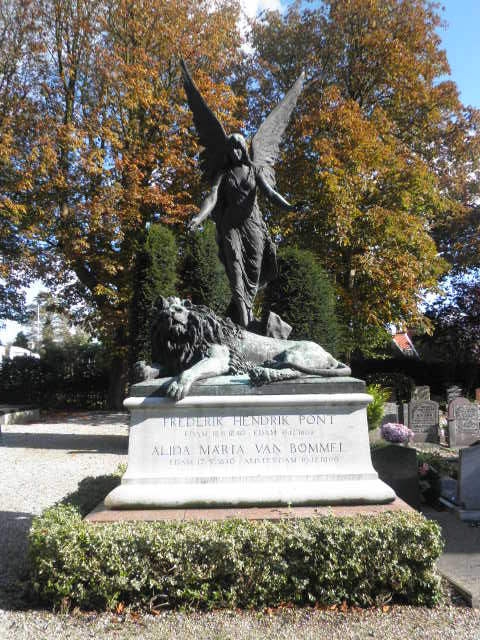
Death of Strength (1888), Edam, Netherlands

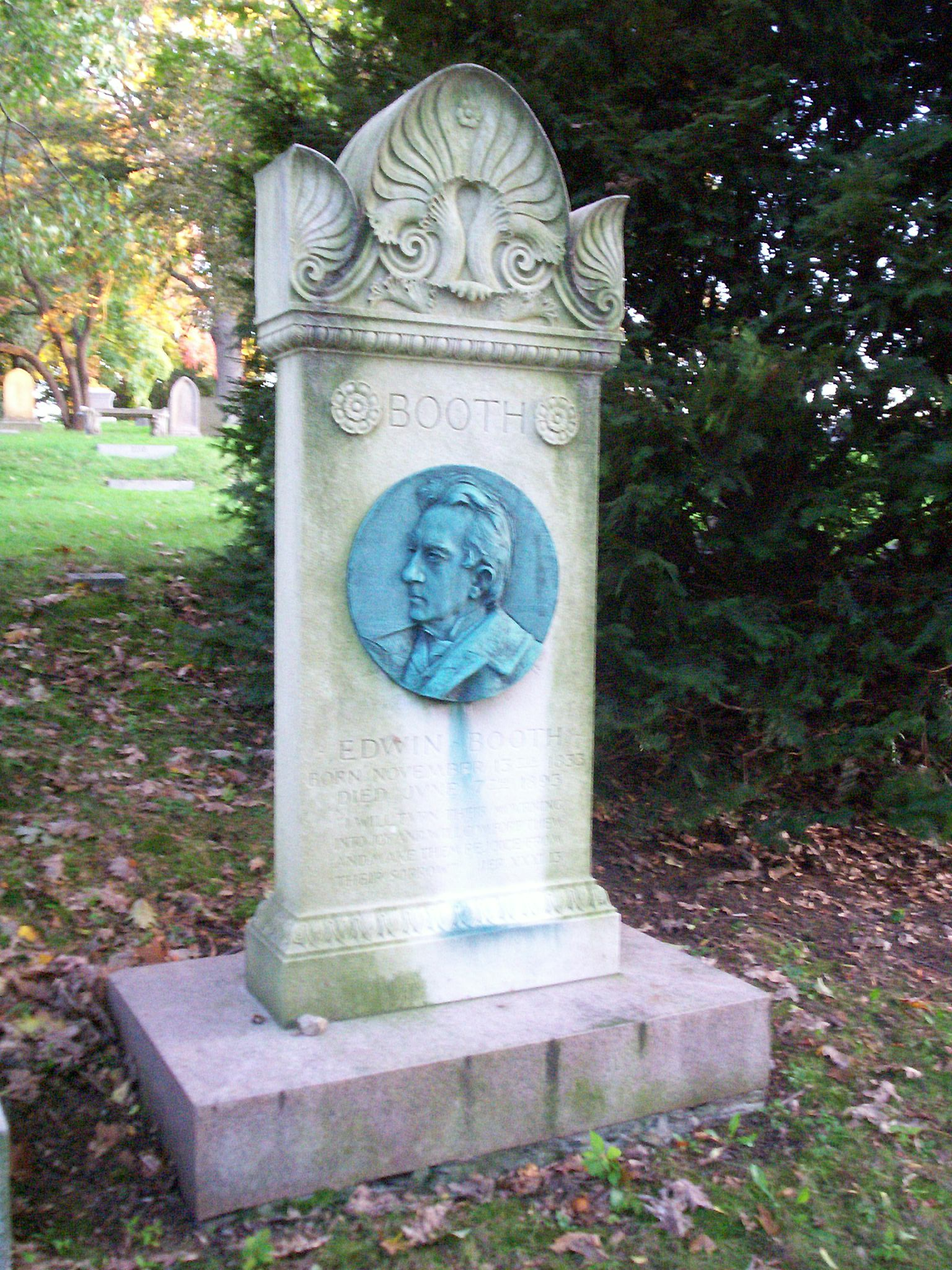
Edwin Booth Monument (1895), Mt. Auburn Cemetery, Cambridge, MA

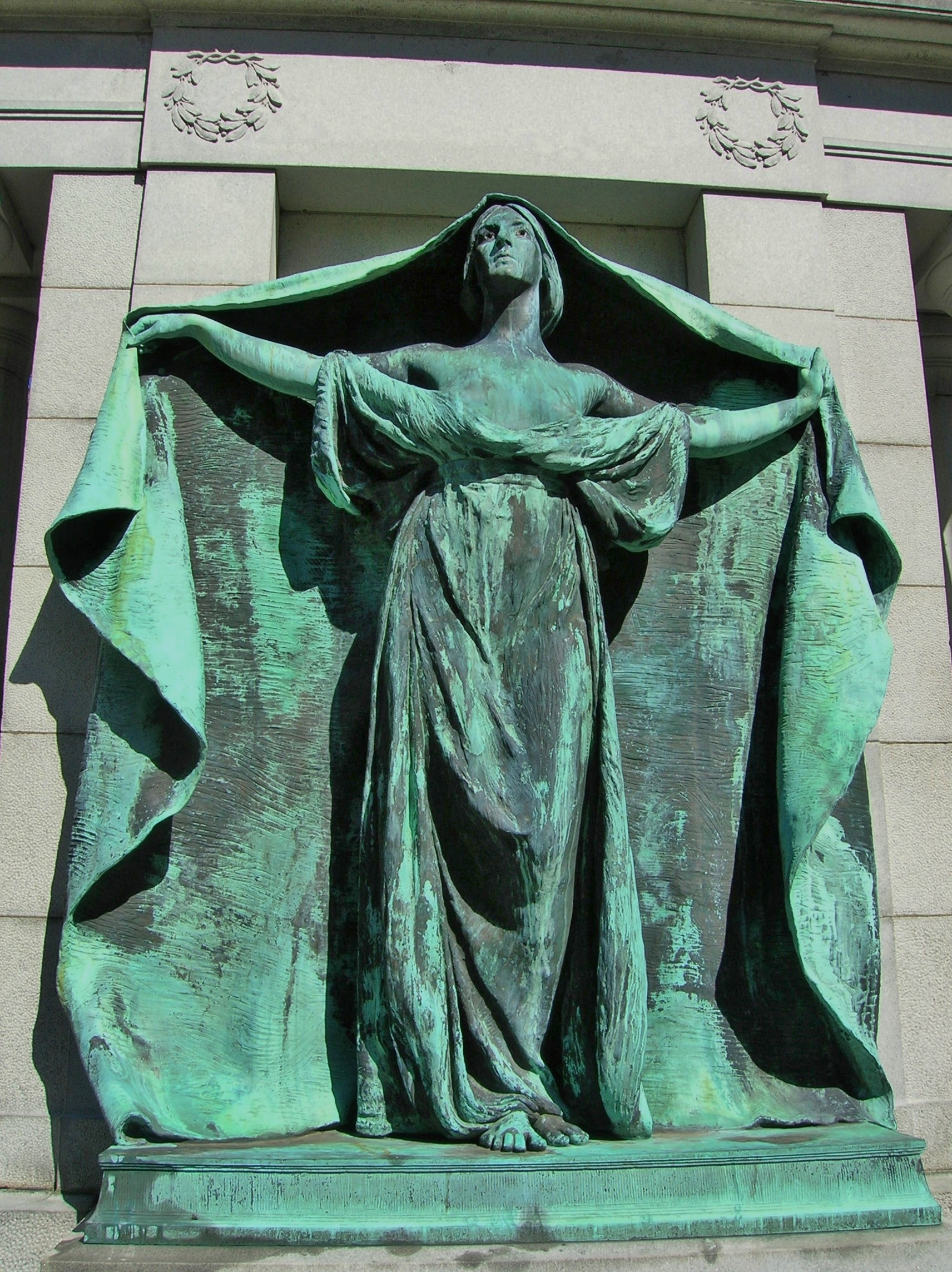
The New Life (1898), Bonney Memorial, Lowell Cemetery, Lowell, MA

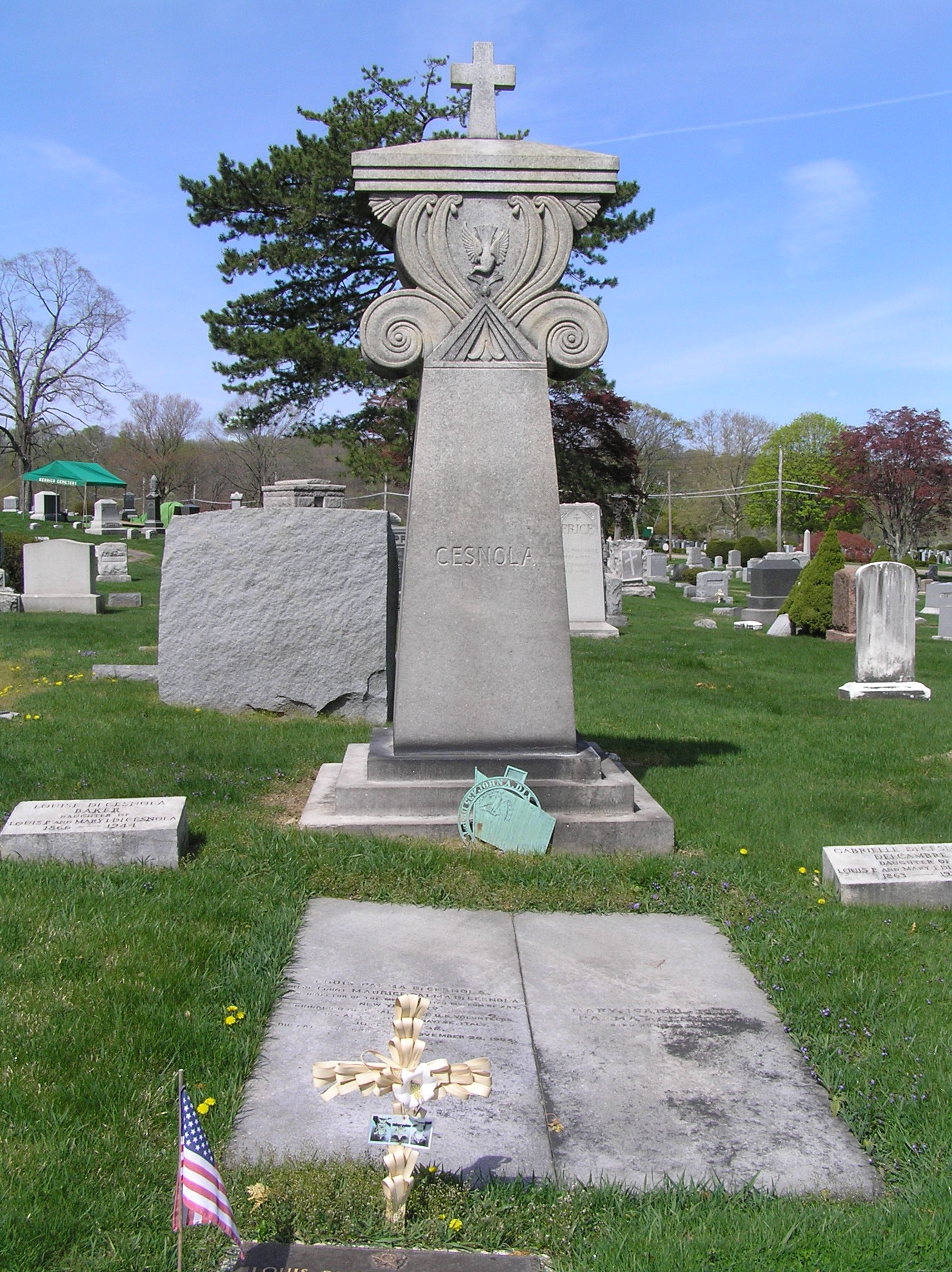
General di Cesnola Monument, Kensico Cemetery, Valhalla, NY

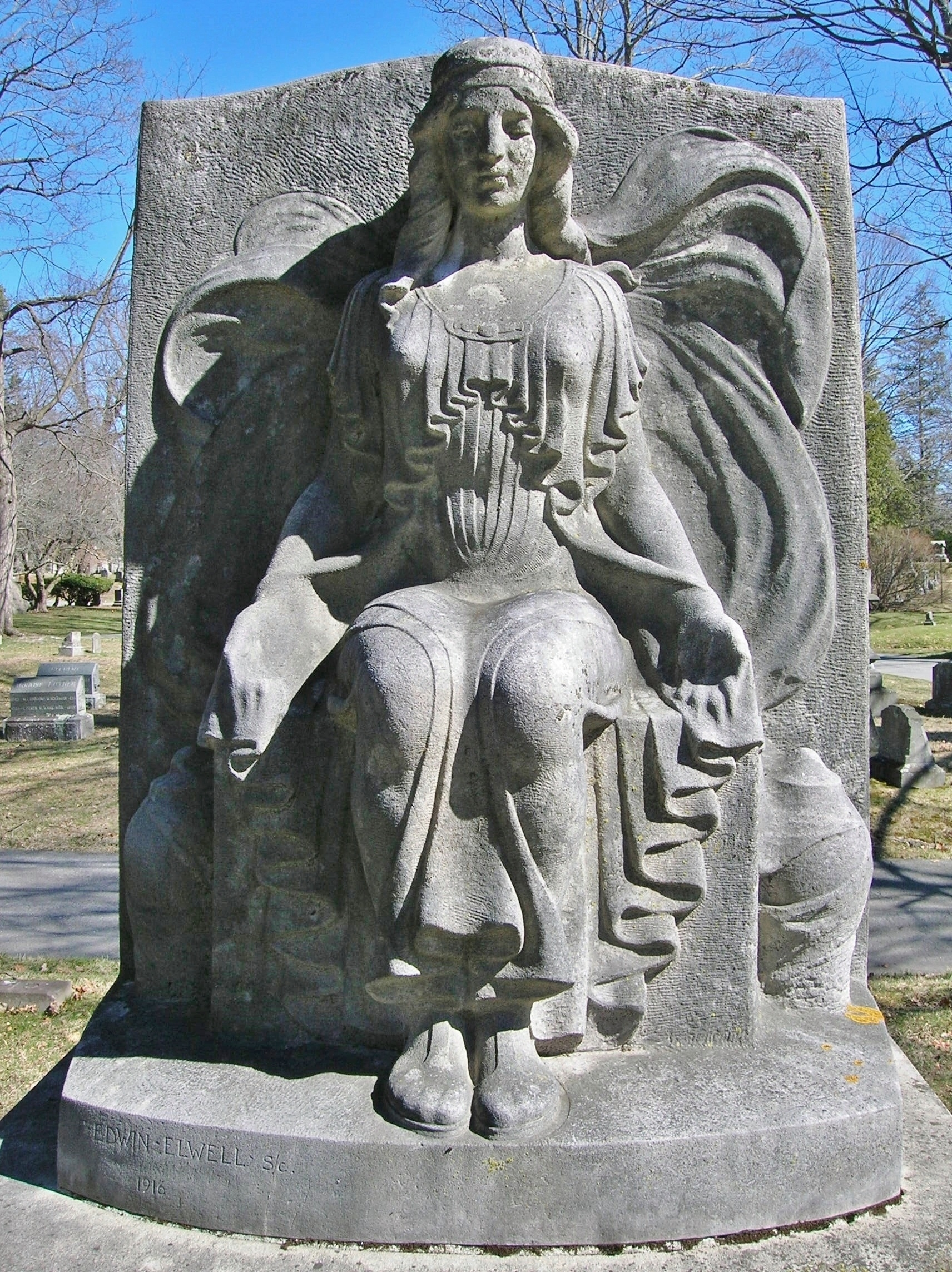
The Genius of Memory (1916), Lowell Cemetery, Lowell, MA

=== Military monuments ===
- 21st Pennsylvania Cavalry Monument (granite, 1893), Overall: 14 ft (4.3 m), Gettysburg Battlefield, Gettysburg, Pennsylvania
- Equestrian Statue of Major-General Winfield Scott Hancock (bronze, 1896), Sculpture: 17 ft (5.2 m), Overall: 34 ft (10 m), Gettysburg Battlefield, Gettysburg, Pennsylvania
- 7th Rhode Island Infantry Monument (bronze 1908), Sculpture: 10 ft (3.0 m), Overall: 14.5 ft (4.4 m), Vicksburg National Military Park, Vicksburg, Mississippi
- Bust of Brigadier General Andrew J. Smith (bronze, 1911), Bust: 52 in (130 cm), Overall: 10.33 ft (3.15 m), Vicksburg National Military Park, Vicksburg, Mississippi
- Relief bust of Colonel Cyrus Bussey (bronze, 1911), height: 42 in (110 cm), Vicksburg National Military Park, Vicksburg, Mississippi
- Relief bust of Colonel William Wade (bronze, 1912), height: 42 in (110 cm), Vicksburg National Military Park, Vicksburg, Mississippi
- Statue of Major General Frederick Steele (bronze, 1912), Figure: 9 ft (2.7 m), Overall: 14 ft (4.3 m), Vicksburg National Military Park, Vicksburg, Mississippi
- Statue of Rear Admiral Charles Henry Davis (bronze, 1917), height: 8 ft (2.4 m), U. S. Navy Memorial, Vicksburg National Military Park, Vicksburg, Mississippi
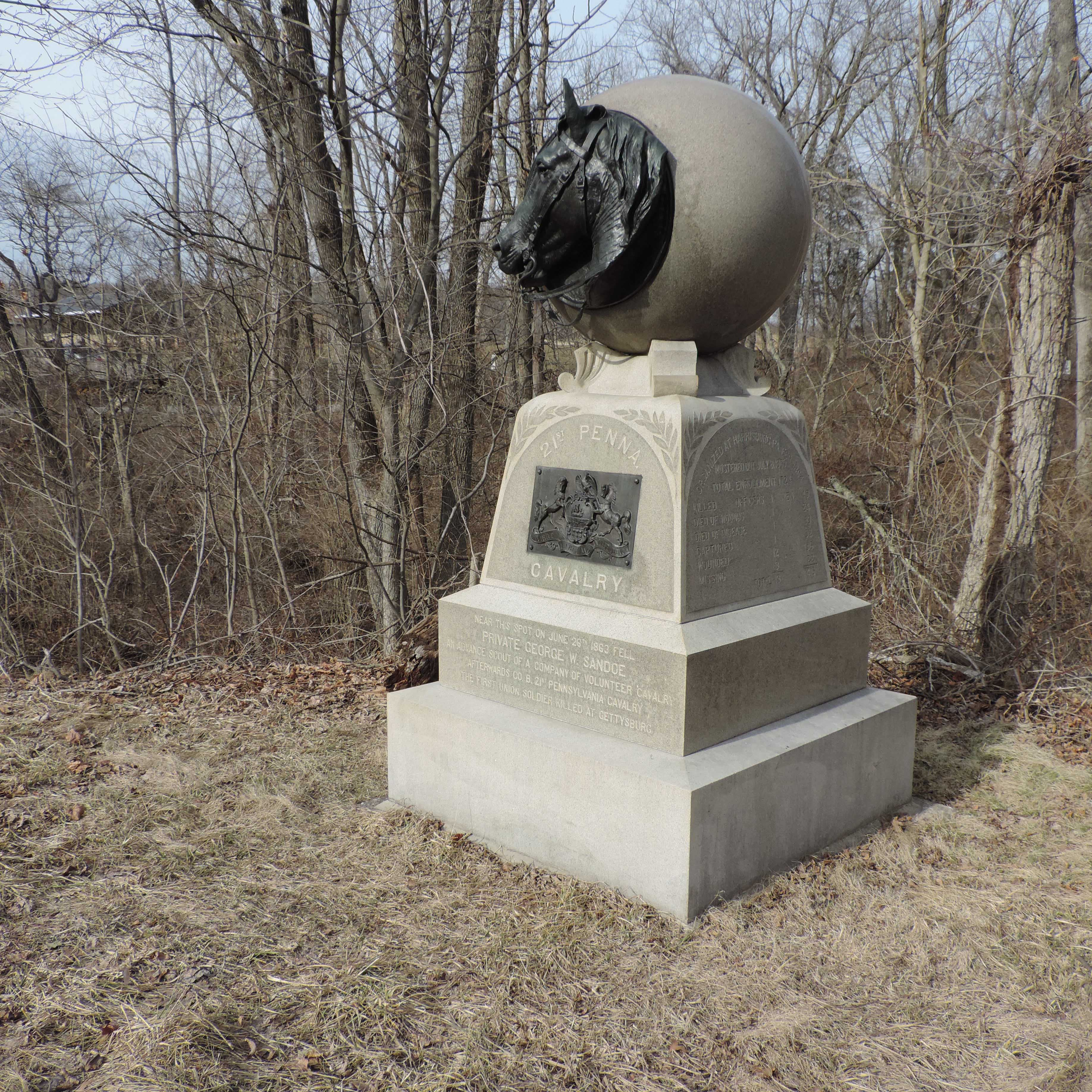
21st Pennsylvania Cavalry Monument (1893), Gettysburg, PA

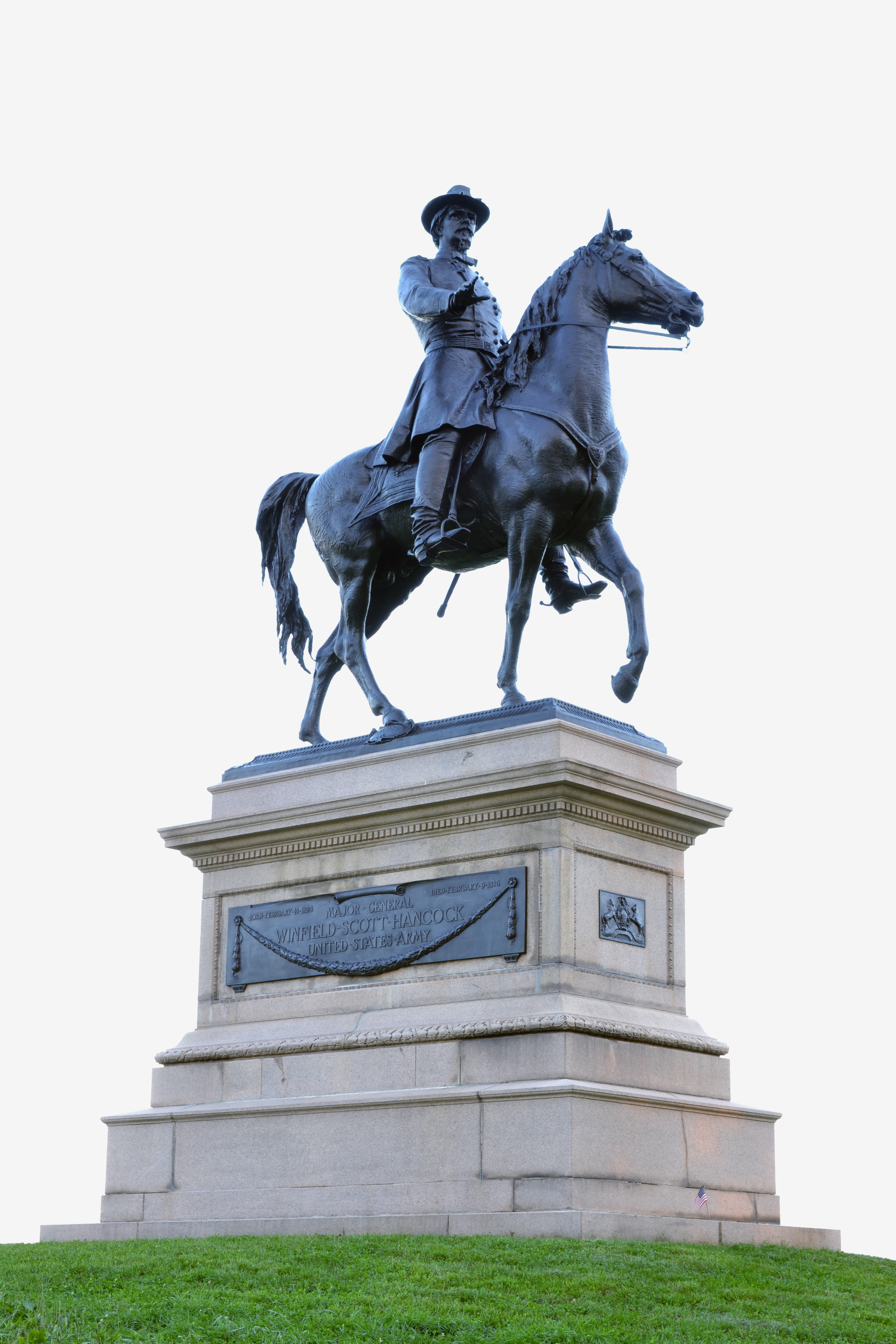
Maj-Gen. Winfield Scott Hancock (1896), Gettysburg, PA

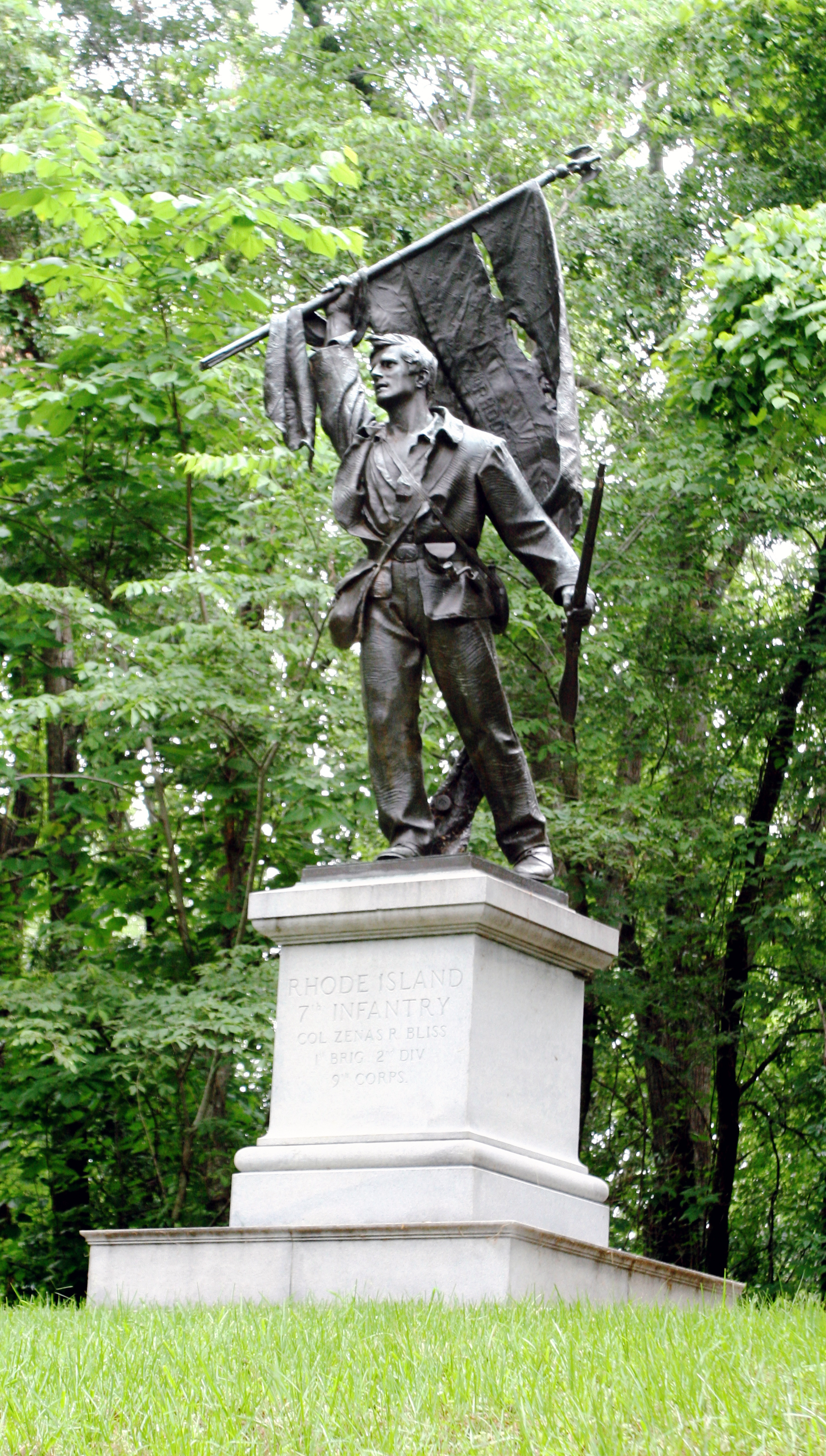
7th Rhode Island Infantry Monument (1908), Vicksburg, MS

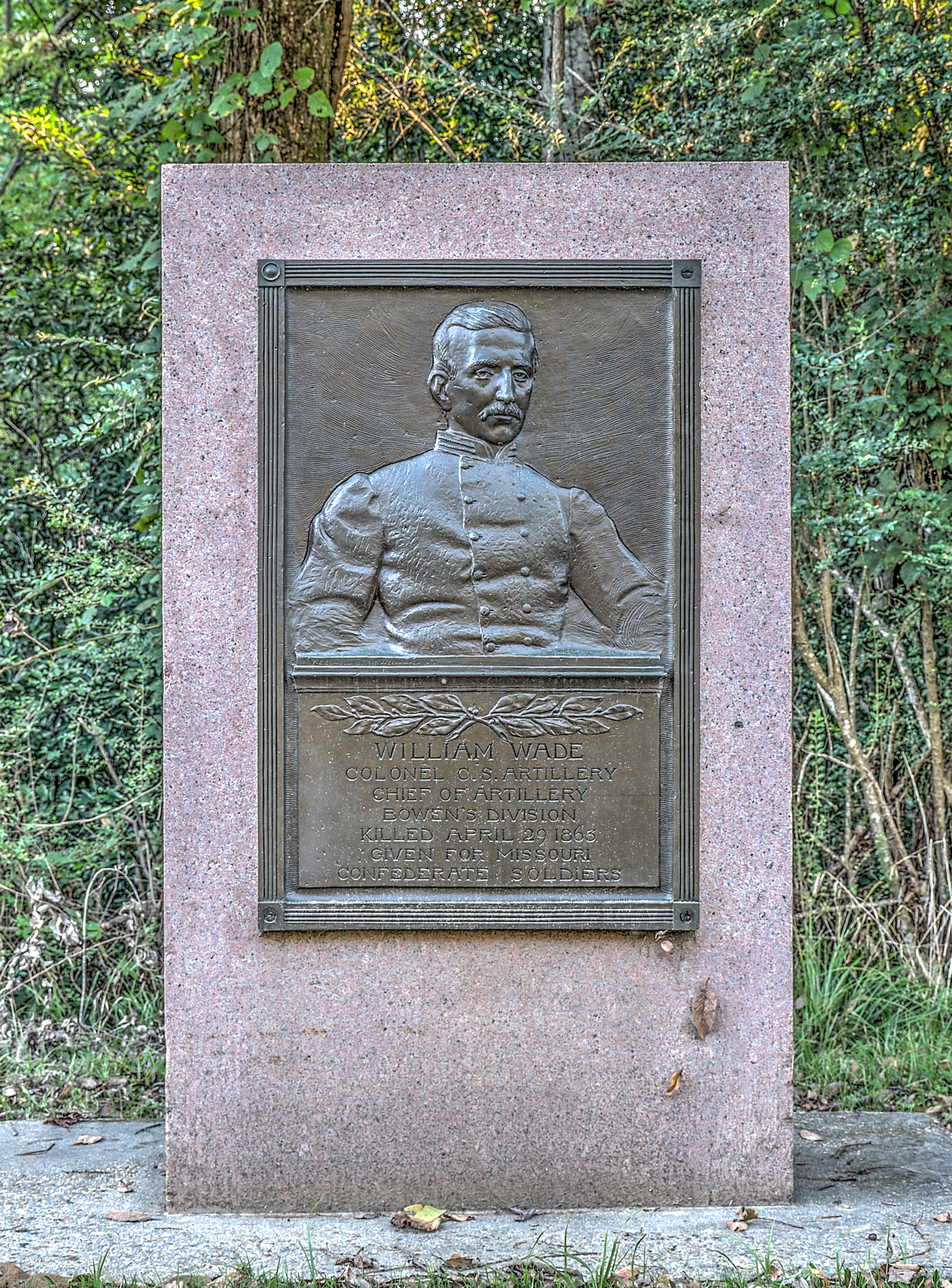
Col. William Wade (1912) Vicksburg, MS

=== Architectural sculptures ===
- Song (by 1898), bas relief panel for the house of George Alfred Townsend.
- Ceres (1901), West Esplanade Fountain, Pan-American Exposition, Buffalo, New York.
- Kronos (1901), West Esplanade Fountain, Pan-American Exposition, Buffalo, New York.
  - Reduced-sized versions of Kronos in plaster and bronze, height: 41 in (100 cm), are at Harvard University, Cambridge, Massachusetts.
- Intelligence (1901), New York State Building, Pan-American Exposition, Buffalo, New York. A Greek-gowned woman seated in an armchair, a book in her lap, and holding a sphere in one hand.
- Classic Art (limestone, 1903), St. Louis Art Museum, St. Louis, Missouri. One of 6 cornice figures created for the portico of the Palace of Fine Arts, 1904 Louisiana Purchase Exposition, Cass Gilbert, architect.
- Heroic Bust of Amzi L. Dodd (marble, (c.1905), Mutual Benefit Life Insurance Company Building, Newark, New Jersey, George B. Post, architect.
- Bust of Colonel Robert T. Van Horn (marble, 1906), Van Horn High School, Independence, Missouri. Created for the façade of the Kansas City Journal Building, Kansas City, Missouri.
- Bust of Dante Alighieri (limestone, 1907), height: 60 in (150 cm), in niche on the façade of Scranton Memorial Library, Madison, Connecticut.
- Bust of William Shakespeare (limestone, 1907), height: 60 in (150 cm), in niche on the façade of Scranton Memorial Library, Madison, Connecticut.
  - Shakespeare's Mirror (bronze, cast 1975), height: 30 in (76 cm), H. Aschehoug & Company Building, Oslo, Norway.
- Greece (limestone, 1907), cornice figure on Alexander Hamilton U.S. Custom House, Manhattan, New York City, assisted by August Zeller.
- Rome (limestone, 1907), cornice figure on Alexander Hamilton U.S. Custom House, Manhattan, New York City, assisted by August Zeller.
- Acrosteria (1915), Agriculture Building, Panama-Pacific International Exposition, San Francisco, California.
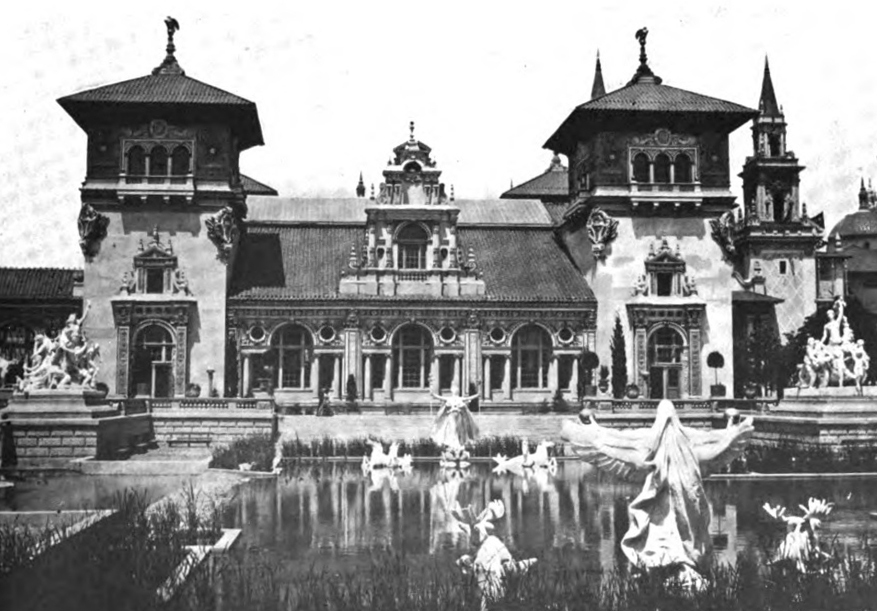
Ceres and Kronos (1901), Pan-American Exposition, Buffalo, New York

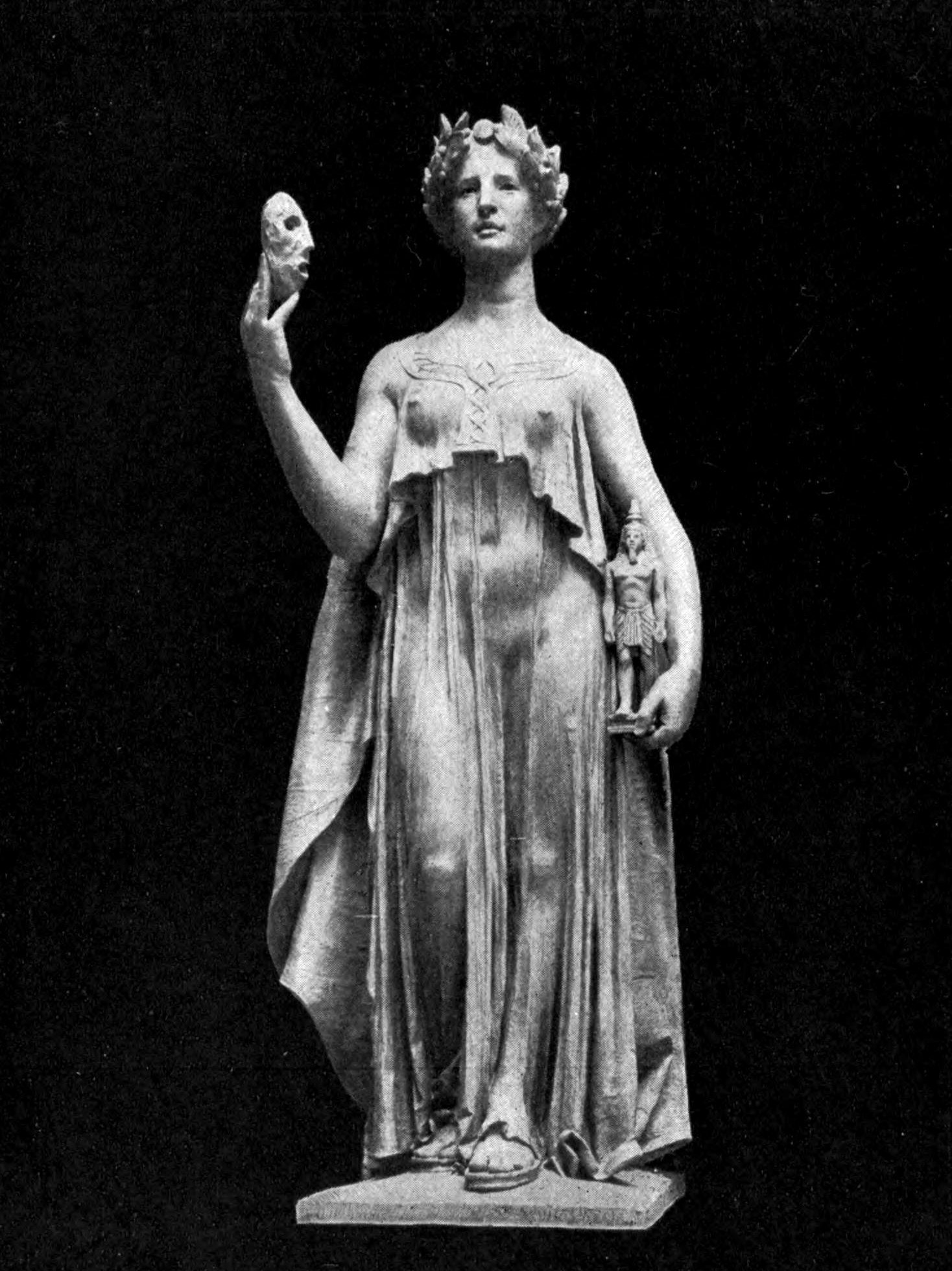
Classic Art (ca.1904), St. Louis Art Museum

Greece (1907), U.S. Custom House, New York City

Rome (1907), U.S. Custom House, New York City
