= Roxborough High School =

The Academies at Roxborough High School
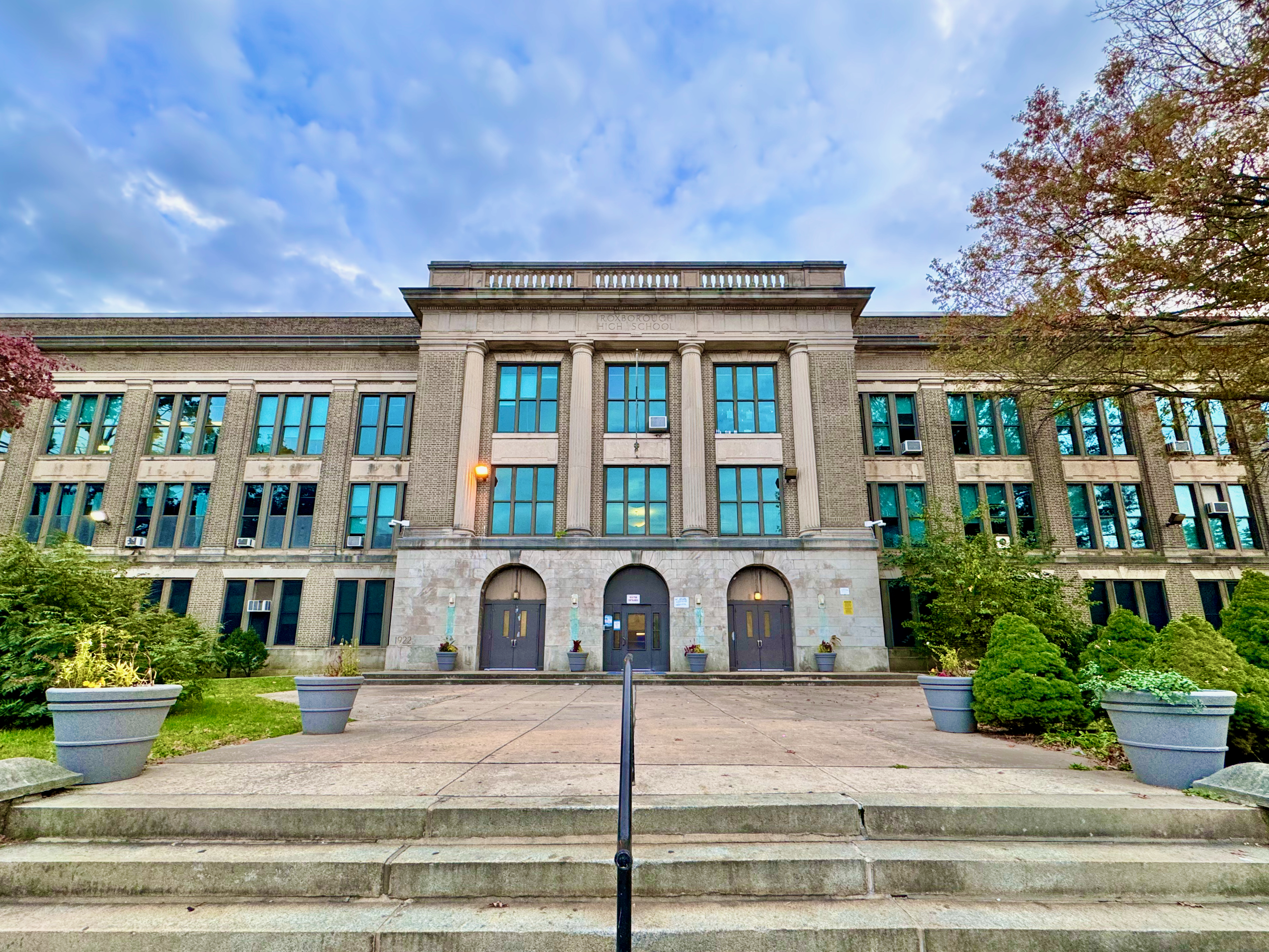
- Roxborough High School

Location
- 6498 Ridge Avenue; Philadelphia, Pennsylvania 19128; United States; 40.0375°N 75.2228°W

Information
- Type: Public high school
- School district: The School District of Philadelphia
- Principal: Kristin Williams-Smalley
- Teaching staff: 63.00 (FTE)
- Grades: 9–12
- Enrollment: 625 (2023–2024)
- Student to teacher ratio: 9.92
- Color
- Mascot: Wolf
- Website: roxboroughhs.philasd.org

The Academies at Roxborough High School (commonly referred to as Roxborough High School) is a public high school in Philadelphia, Pennsylvania, operated by the School District of Philadelphia and servicing the Roxborough, Manayunk, Chestnut Hill, Wissahickon, East Falls, Mt. Airy, and Germantown sections of Philadelphia.

== History ==
Construction on Roxborough High School began in 1922. It was the first combination junior/senior high school in the city of Philadelphia. Students attended classes on the third floor while construction of the lower floors continued until the building's completion in 1924. The school cost more than $800,000 to build and an additional $80,000 to furnish. Its first graduating class was in 1927. Early clubs included the Penmanship Club, Basketry Club, Dressmaking Club, and the Sewing Circle Club.

The school song, "Way Up on the Hill," was written by Charles “Chick” Galt, class of 1924. School plays began in 1925. The school library opened in 1927 and the band was organized in 1938. The school newspaper, The Ridge Record, was first published in November 1929. The school’s literary magazine,The Wissahickon, was first published in the 1920s and had been renamed Images by the 1990s. A new lunchroom was built in the 1960s. In the 1970s, female students were allowed to wear pants to school for the first time.

In 2006 school district officials stated that disorder was not increasing at Roxborough High while some teachers stated that it was.

In 2010 Manayunk resident and Philadelphia School District teacher Keith Newman criticized the school district's handling of the high school, stating that it should not be ranked as "persistently dangerous" since it is in a relatively well-to-do area. At the time he was running for election for a political position.

Roxborough alumnus Stephen Brandt made efforts to turn around the school during his time as principal. The school district had asked him, previously a Norristown School District employee, to help improve the high school. He received the 2013 Lindback Award for Distinguished Principal Leadership. In 2013 Brandt, then the outgoing principal, stated that Dana Jenkins was going to be the new principal.

In 2016 the school received a $1 million grant from the Philadelphia School Partnership.

On September 27, 2022, a mass shooting occurred outside of the school where 2-5 gunmen ambushed and fired at least 70 times at a group of football players who were finishing a football scrimmage. Fourteen-year-old Nicolas Elizalde died from his injuries and 4 people were wounded. Five suspected shooters have been captured, and one pleaded guilty and was sentenced to 30–60 years in prison, the others still await possible judgment. As the school's original mascot (the "Indians") was considered racist and the wolf was Elizalde's favorite animal, in 2023, Roxborough High changed its mascot to the "Wolves" in memory of Elizalde.

On January 4, 2026, Roxborough High School was a victim of hate speech and antisemitism, when an unidentified suspect vandalized the exterior of the school's building. The vandalism would be immediately removed the same day, with school staff and the community responding by greeting students and writing encouraging messages in chalk, the next day.

== Curriculum ==
Roxborough has a separate Ninth Grade Academy that leads into three academies for grades 10-12: The Academy of Visual Arts Production, The Academy of Health Sciences and Research, and The Academy of Business Technology and Entrepreneurship. Roxborough High School's CTE programs include Web Design, Film and Video Production, Digital Media, Biotechnology, Kinesiology, Business Technology, and Business Applications.

== Academic performance ==
In 2015 Jenkins stated that the graduation rate was 84%. A 2015 Philadelphia Inquirer article stated that the school, while experiencing issues involving a lack of resources, was one of the best-performing comprehensive high schools in Philadelphia.

== Feeder schools ==
Roxborough's catchment includes those zoned to:

- Cook-Wissahickon School
- James Dobson Elementary School
- Charles W. Henry School
- Henry H. Houston Elementary School
- John Story Jenks School
- Anna L. Lingelbach School
- Thomas Mifflin School
- Shawmont School

== Alumni association ==
The Roxborough High School Alumni Association was founded in 1927. The association assists with benefitting the school's mission and spirit, as well as funding college scholarships for high-achieving students.

== Notable alumni ==
- Buddy Harris, Major League Baseball Pitcher for Houston Astros (1970-1971)
- Stanley Clarke, world-famous jazz bassist, winner of 5 Grammy awards. (1968)
- Rodney Hicks, American playwright, stage, television, and film actor
- Rasheed Bailey, American gridiron football player, 2x Grey Cup Champion with the Winnipeg Blue Bombers
