= Richmond School (disambiguation) =

Richmond School, also known as Richmond School and Sixth Form College, is a historic British school in Yorkshire near Richmond, England. Alternatively, it may refer to:

in Canada

- School District 38 Richmond, Richmond, British Columbia, Canada

in the United Kingdom

- Richmond School of Art (1947–54), in Richmond-on-Thames, London

in the United States

- West Contra Costa Unified School District, formerly Richmond Unified School District, Richmond, California
- Richmond High School of Richmond Community Schools, Richmond, Michigan
- Richmond School (Philadelphia, Pennsylvania), listed on the National Register of Historic Places (NRHP) in northeast Philadelphia
