= Memphis Street Academy =

- John Paul Jones Junior High School
- U.S. National Register of Historic Places
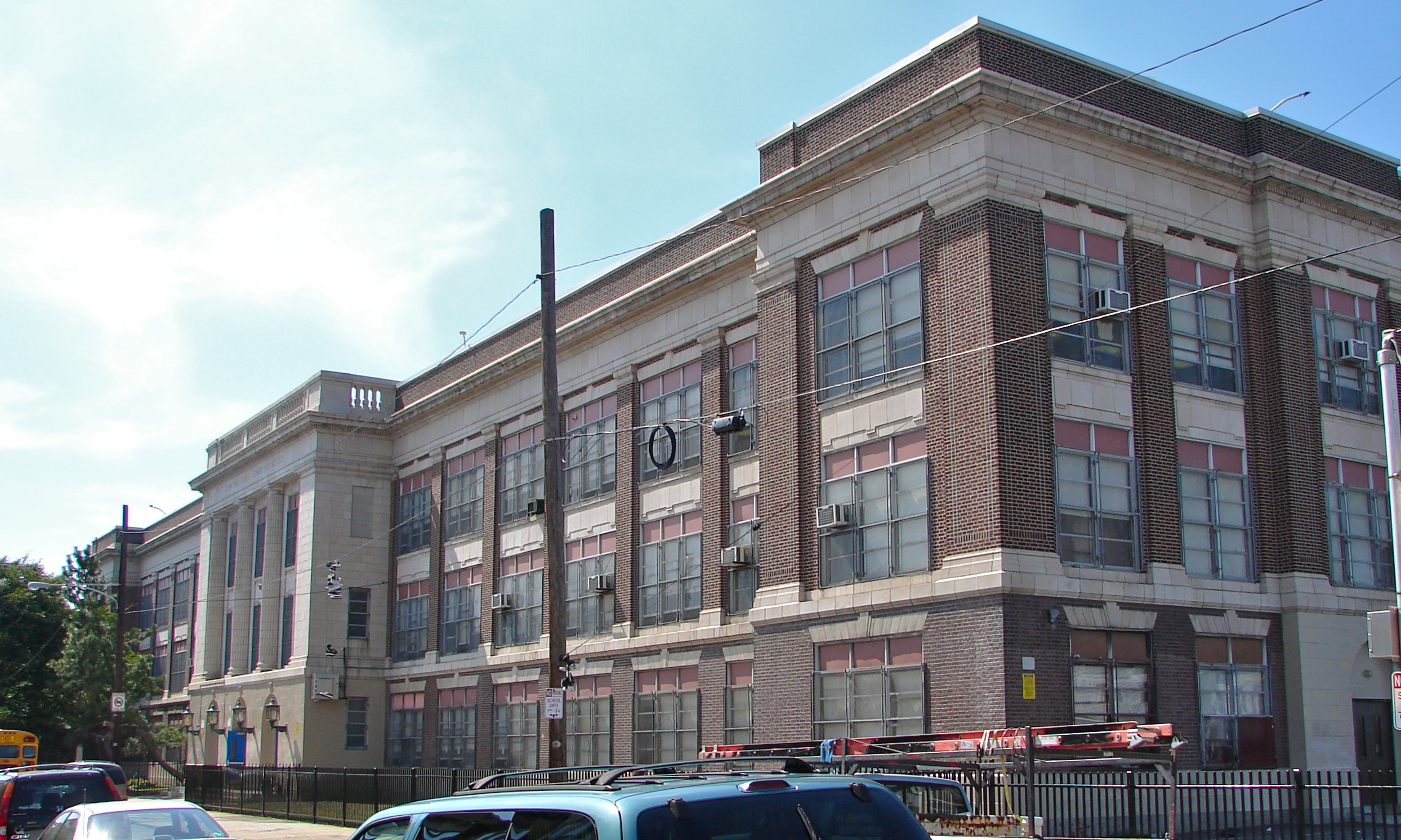
- John Paul Jones Junior High School, September 2010

- Location within Philadelphia Location within Pennsylvania Location within the United States
- Location: 2950 Memphis St., Philadelphia, Pennsylvania
- Coordinates: 39.9862°N 75.1128°W
- Area: 2 acres (0.81 ha)
- Built: 1923–1924
- Built by: Ketcham & McQuade
- Architect: Irwin T. Catharine
- Architectural style: Colonial Revival
- MPS: Philadelphia Public Schools TR
- NRHP reference No.: 88002287
- Added to NRHP: November 18, 1988

The Memphis Street Academy Charter School at J.P. Jones is a charter school that is located in the Port Richmond neighborhood of Philadelphia, Pennsylvania.

The building was added to the National Register of Historic Places in 1988.

== History and architectural features ==
Located in the former John Paul Jones Junior High School building, this historic school was designed by Irwin T. Catharine and built between 1923 and 1924. It is a three-story, seventeen-bay, brick building that sits on a raised basement. Designed in the Colonial Revival style, it features a central projecting entrance pavilion of stone, brick pilasters, and stone cornice and brick parapet. It was named for Naval hero John Paul Jones (1747–1792).
