= Irwin T. Catharine =

American architect

Irwin Thornton Catharine (October 22, 1883 – March 3, 1944) was the chief architect of Philadelphia public schools from 1920 until his retirement in 1937. Buildings built during Catharine's tenure ranged from Gothic Revival, as in the case of Simon Gratz High School, to Streamline Moderne, as in his last project, Joseph H. Brown Elementary School. He died in Philadelphia in 1944.

Catharine succeeded Henry deCoursey Richards as the main school designer in Philadelphia. From 1918 to 1937, his work added 104 new buildings (replacing 37 existing ones), added wings to 26 other schools, and otherwise improved at least 50 other schools.

A number of Catharine's works are listed on the U.S. National Register of Historic Places.

The former Edward Bok Vocational School, in the Wharton neighborhood of South Philadelphia, which has been repurposed as the Bok Building for commercial uses after the closure of the school it housed, has a bar and restaurant on its top floor named Irwin's, in honor of Catharine.

== Works ==
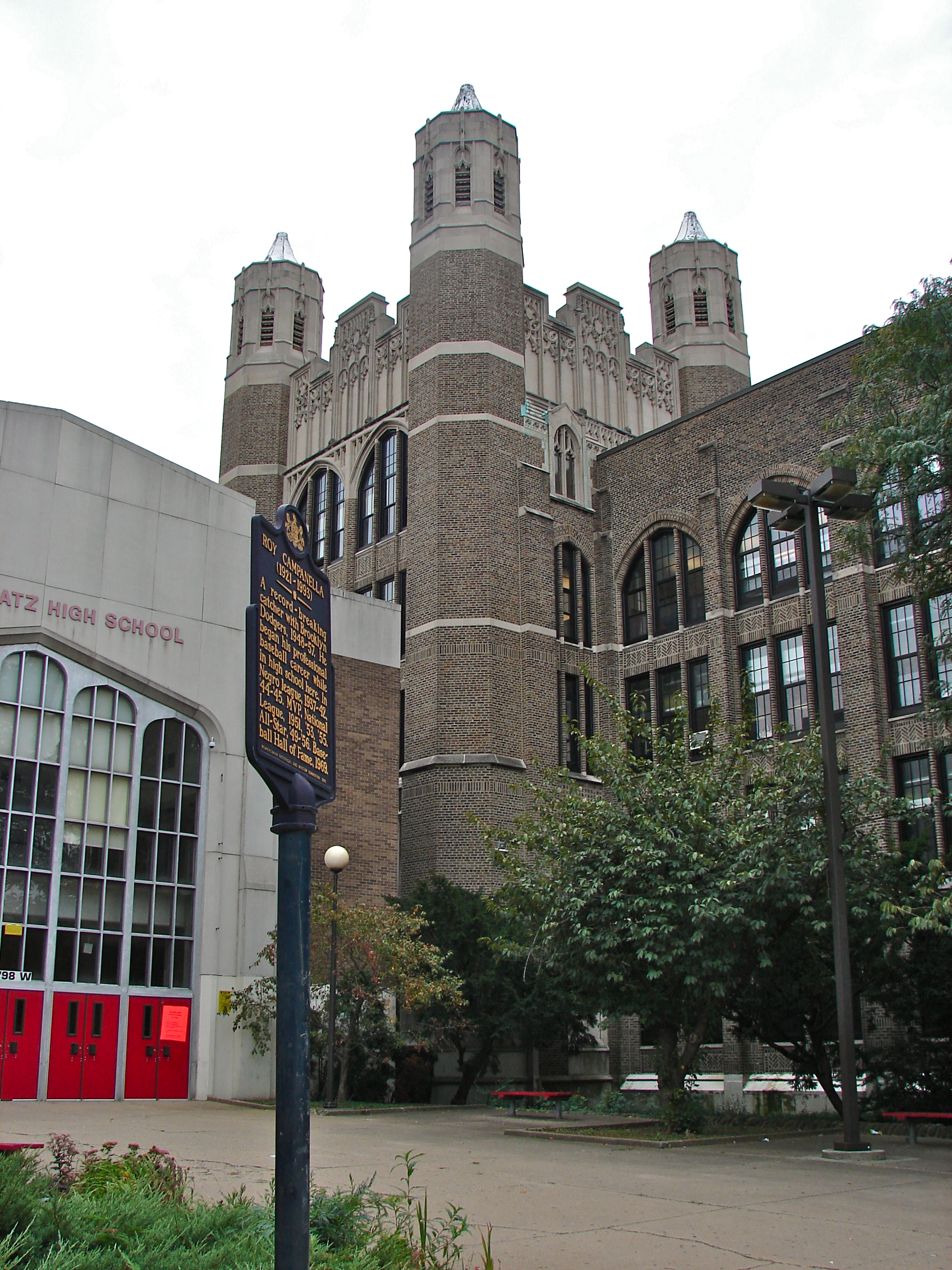
Simon Gratz High School

Catharine's works (all in Philadelphia) include the following. If Catharine has notable works outside of Philadelphia, none are listed on the National Register.

- Universal Alcorn Charter Elementary School, (1931), 1500 S. 32nd St., NRHP-listed
- Ethan Allen School, 3001 Robbins Ave., NRHP-listed
- Charles Y. Audenried Junior High School, 1601 S. 33rd St., NRHP-listed
- Clara Barton School, 300 E. Wyoming Ave., NRHP-listed
- John Bartram High School, 67th and Elmwood Sts., NRHP-listed
- Dimner Beeber Middle School, 5901 Malvern Ave., NRHP-listed
- Belmont Charter School, 4030-4060 Brown St., NRHP-listed
- Rudolph Blankenburg School, 4600 Girard Ave., NRHP-listed
- Board of Education Building, 21st St. and Benjamin Franklin Pkwy., NRHP-listed
- Edward Bok Vocational School, 1909 S. Ninth St., NRHP-listed
- Daniel Boone School, Hancock and Wildey Sts., NRHP-listed
- F. Amadee Bregy School, 1700 Bigler St., NRHP-listed
- Joseph H. Brown School, 8118-8120 Frankford Ave., NRHP-listed
- Laura H. Carnell School, 6101 Summerdale Ave., NRHP-listed
- Lewis C. Cassidy School, 6523-6543 Lansdowne Ave., NRHP-listed
- Castor Gardens Middle School, Cottman Ave. and Loretto Ave., NRHP-listed
- Joseph W. Catharine School, 6600 Chester Ave., NRHP-listed
- Central High School, Olney and Ogontz Aves.,
- Logan neighborhood of Philadelphia, NRHP-listed
- Conwell Middle Magnet School, 1829-1951 E. Clearfield St., NRHP-listed
- Jay Cooke Junior High School, 4735 Old York Rd., NRHP-listed
- Thomas Creighton School, 5401 Tabor Rd., NRHP-listed
- Kennedy Crossan School, 7341 Palmetto St., NRHP-listed
- Lydia Darrah School, 708-732 N. 17th St., NRHP-listed
- Hamilton Disston School, 6801 Cottage St., NRHP-listed
- Murrell Dobbins Vocational School, 2100 Lehigh Ave., NRHP-listed
- James Dobson School, 4665 Umbria St., NRHP-listed
- Laurence Dunbar School, 12th above Columbia Ave., NRHP-listed
- Henry R. Edmunds School, 1101-1197 Haworth St., NRHP-listed
- James Elverson, Jr. School, 1300 Susquehanna Ave., NRHP-listed
- Eleanor Cope Emlen School of Practice, 6501 Chew St., NRHP-listed
- Federal Street School, 1130-1148 Federal St., NRHP-listed
- D. Newlin Fell School, 900 Oregon Ave., NRHP-listed
- Joseph C. Ferguson School, 2000-2046 7th St., NRHP-listed
- Thomas K. Finletter School, 6101 N. Front St., NRHP-listed
- Thomas Fitzsimons Junior High School, 2601 W. Cumberland St., NRHP-listed
- Edwin Forrest School, 4300 Bleigh St., NRHP-listed
- Robert Fulton School, 60-68 E. Haines St., NRHP-listed
- Elizabeth Duane Gillespie Junior High School, 3901-3961 N. 18th St., NRHP-listed
- Simon Gratz High School, 3901-3961 N. 18th St., NRHP-listed
- Warren G. Harding Junior High School, 2000 Wakeling St., NRHP-listed
- William H. Harrison School, 1012-1020 W. Thompson St., NRHP-listed
- Francis Hopkinson School, 1301-1331 E. Luzerne Ave., NRHP-listed
- Henry H. Houston School, 135 W. Allen's Ln., NRHP-listed
- Thomas Jefferson School, 1101-1125 N. 4th St., NRHP-listed
- John Story Jenks School, 8301-8317 Germantown Ave., NRHP-listed
- John Paul Jones Junior High School, 2922 Memphis St., NRHP-listed
- Eliza Butler Kirkbride School, 626 Dickinson St., NRHP-listed
- Logan Demonstration School, 5000 N. 17th St., NRHP-listed
- James R. Ludlow School, 1323-1345 N. 6th St., NRHP-listed
- William Mann School, 1835-1869 N. 54th St., NRHP-listed
- Martin Orthopedic School, 800 N. 22nd St., NRHP-listed
- Delaplaine McDaniel School, 2100 Moore St., NRHP-listed
- George Meade School, 1801 Oxford St., NRHP-listed
- William M. Meredith School, 5th and Fitzwater Sts., NRHP-listed
- Thomas Mifflin School, 3500 Midvale Ave., NRHP-listed
- Andrew J. Morrison School, 300 Duncannon St., NRHP-listed
- George W. Nebinger School, 601-627 Carpenter St., NRHP-listed
- Jeremiah Nichols School, 1235 S. 16th St., NRHP-listed
- Olney High School, Duncannon and Front Sts., NRHP-listed
- Overbrook High School, 59th and Lancaster Ave., NRHP-listed
- Academy at Palumbo, 1100 Catharine St., NRHP-listed
- John M. Patterson School, 7001 Buist Ave., NRHP-listed
- William S. Peirce School, 2400 Christian St., NRHP-listed
- Penn Treaty Junior High School, 600 E. Thompson St., NRHP-listed
- Joseph Pennell School, 1800-1856 Nedro St., NRHP-listed
- Samuel W. Pennypacker School, 1800-1850 E. Washington Ln., NRHP-listed
- Philadelphia High School for Girls (now Julia R. Masterman School), 17th and Spring Garden Sts., NRHP-listed
- Gen. John F. Reynolds School, 2300 Jefferson St., NRHP-listed
- Richmond School, 2942 Belgrade St., NRHP-listed
- Theodore Roosevelt Junior High School, 430 E. Washington Ln., NRHP-listed
- William Rowen School, 6801 N. 19th St., NRHP-listed
- Anna Howard Shaw Junior High School, 5401 Warrington St., NRHP-listed
- William Shoemaker Junior High School, 1464-1488 N. 53rd St., NRHP-listed
- Franklin Smedley School, 5199 Mulberry St., NRHP-listed
- Walter George Smith School, 1300 S. 19th St., NRHP-listed
- Spring Garden School No. 1, 12th and Ogden Sts., NRHP-listed
- Spring Garden School No. 2, Melon St. S of 12th St., NRHP-listed
- Edwin M. Stanton School, 1616-1644 Christian St., NRHP-listed
- Thaddeus Stevens School of Observation, 1301 Spring Garden St., NRHP-listed
- James J. Sullivan School, 5300 Ditman St., NRHP-listed
- Mayer Sulzberger Junior High School, 701-741 N. 48th St., NRHP-listed
- George C. Thomas Junior High School, 2746 S. 9th St., NRHP-listed
- William J. Tilden Junior High School, 66th St. and Elmwood Ave., NRHP-listed
- Edwin H. Vare Junior High School, 2102 S. 24th St., NRHP-listed
- Roberts Vaux Junior High School, 230-2344 W. Master St., NRHP-listed
- Gen. Louis Wagner Junior High School, 17th and Chelton Sts., NRHP-listed
- George Washington School, 5th and Federal Sts., NRHP-listed
- Mary Channing Wister School, 843-855 N. 8th St., NRHP-listed
- George Wolf School, 8100 Lyons Ave., NRHP-listed
