= Dimner Beeber Middle School =

- Dimner Beeber Junior High School
- U.S. National Register of Historic Places
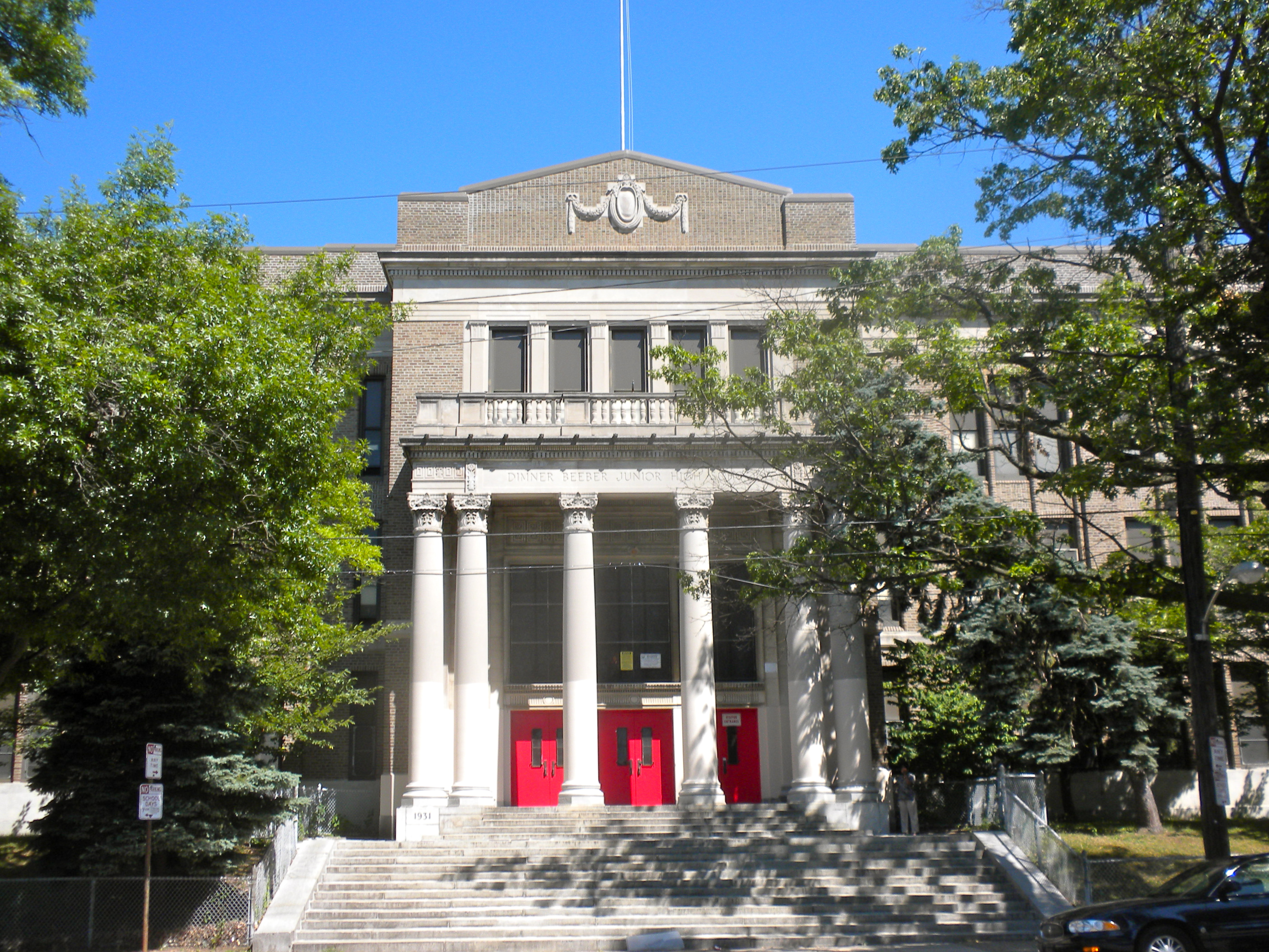
- Dimner Beeber Junior High School, June 2010

- Location within Philadelphia Location within Pennsylvania Location within the United States
- Location: 5925 Malvern Ave., Philadelphia, Pennsylvania
- Coordinates: 39°59′11″N 75°14′32″W
- Area: 2.5 acres (1.0 ha)
- Built: 1931–1932
- Architect: Irwin T. Catharine
- Architectural style: Classical Revival
- MPS: Philadelphia Public Schools TR
- NRHP reference No.: 88002244
- Added to NRHP: November 18, 1988

Dimner Beeber Middle School was a historic public middle school located in the Wynnefield neighborhood of Philadelphia. It was part of the School District of Philadelphia. The school closed in 2017.

The building was designed by Irwin T. Catharine and built in 1931–1932. It is a three-story, 15-bay brick building on a stone basement in the Classical Revival style. It was added to the National Register of Historic Places in 1988. It features a projecting center section and projecting end bays, projecting brick pilasters with stone bases and caps, a moulded cornice, and a balustraded parapet.

Starting in 2013, Beeber shared its building with the Science Leadership Academy at Beeber, the second branch of the Science Leadership Academy. The high school, which focuses on science and technology, is still open.
