= John M. Patterson School =

- U.S. National Register of Historic Places
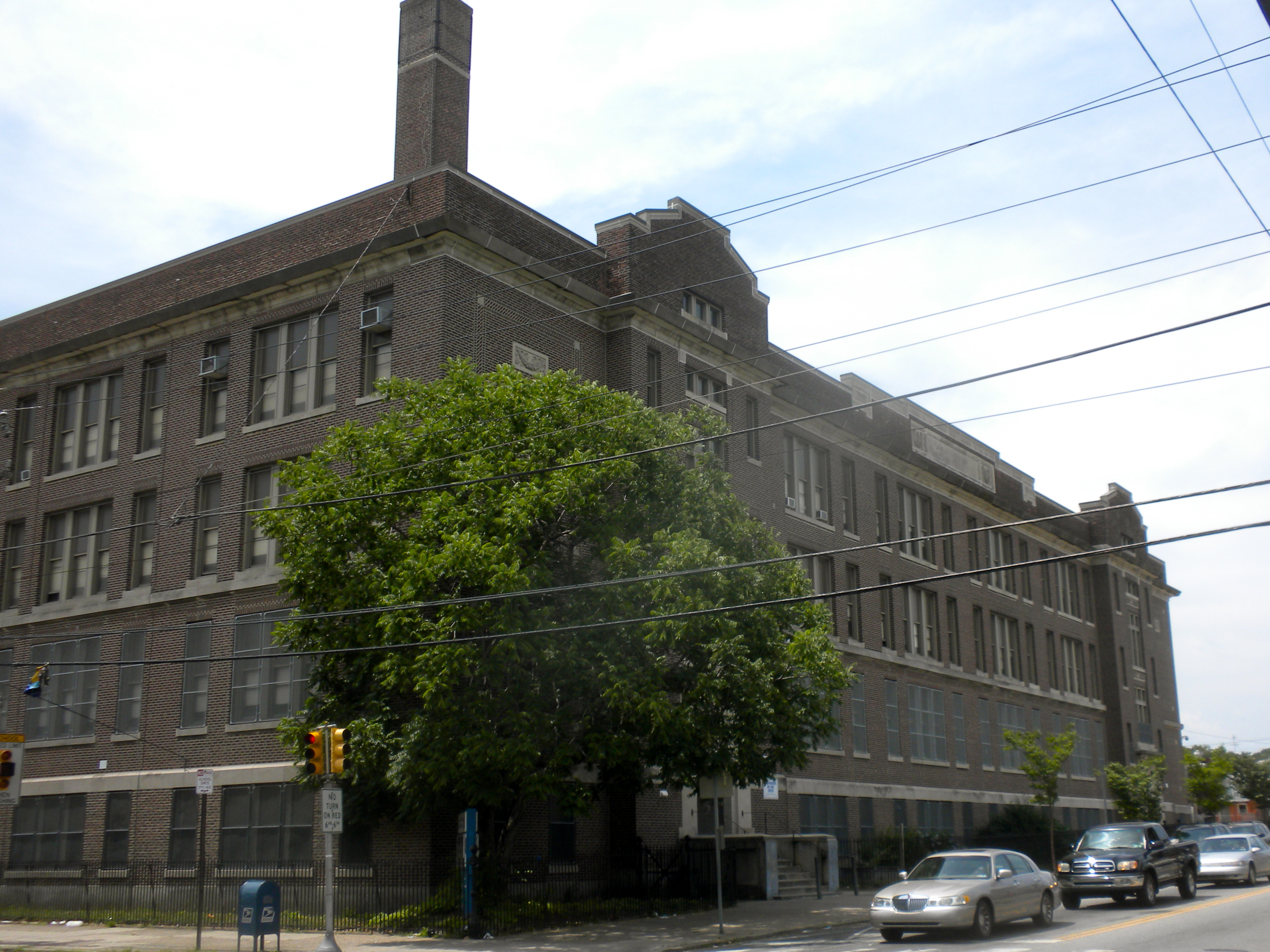
- John M. Paterson School, June 2010

- Location within Philadelphia Location within Pennsylvania Location within the United States
- Location: 7001 Buist Ave., Philadelphia, Pennsylvania, United States
- Coordinates: 39°54′58″N 75°14′12″W
- Area: 2.5 acres (1.0 ha)
- Built: 1920–1921
- Built by: John D. Cassell
- Architect: Irwin T. Catharine
- Architectural style: Colonial Revival
- MPS: Philadelphia Public Schools TR
- NRHP reference No.: 88002305
- Added to NRHP: November 18, 1988

The John M. Patterson School is a historic American elementary school located in the Penrose neighborhood of Philadelphia, Pennsylvania, United States. It is part of the School District of Philadelphia.

It was added to the National Register of Historic Places in 1988.

== History and architectural features ==
Designed by Irwin T. Catharine, this historic structure was built between 1920 and 1921. It is a three-story, eight-bay by three-bay, brick building that sits on a raised stone basement. Designed in the Colonial Revival-style, it features a large center entrance, stone coping, and a parapet.
