= Andrew J. Morrison School =

- U.S. National Register of Historic Places
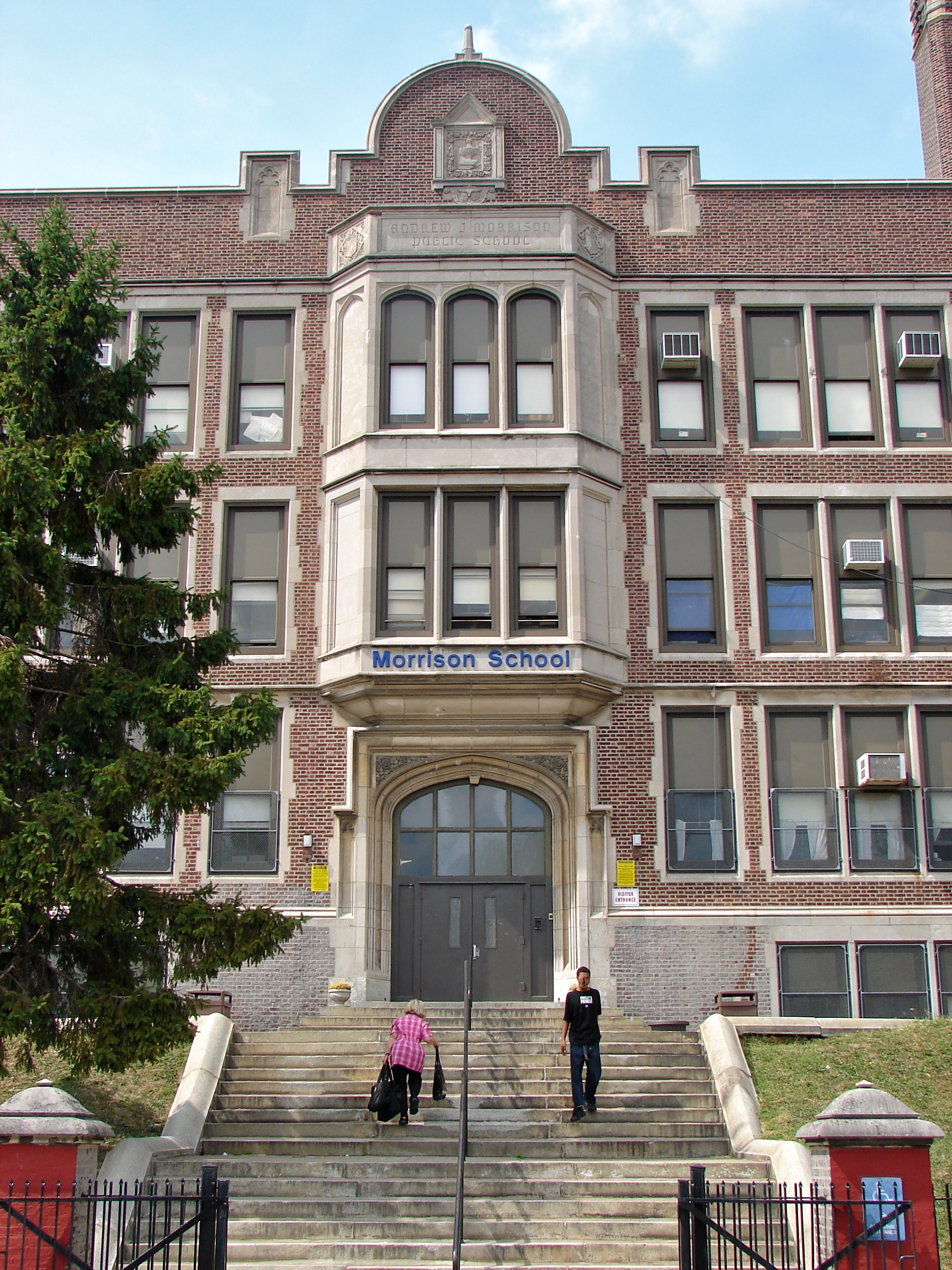
- Andrew J. Morrison School, September 2010

- Location within Philadelphia Location within Pennsylvania Location within the United States
- Location: 5100 N. 3rd St., Philadelphia, Pennsylvania
- Coordinates: 40.0297°N 75.1296°W
- Area: 2.5 acres (1.0 ha)
- Built: 1922–1924
- Architect: Irwin T. Catharine
- Architectural style: Late Gothic Revival, Tudor Revival
- MPS: Philadelphia Public Schools TR
- NRHP reference No.: 88002302
- Added to NRHP: November 18, 1988

Andrew J. Morrison School is a historic school located in the Olney neighborhood of Philadelphia, Pennsylvania. It functions as a K–8 school under the School District of Philadelphia. The building was designed by Irwin T. Catharine and built in 1922–1924. It is a three-story, red brick building on a raised basement in a Late Gothic Revival / Tudor Revival-style. It features carved stone decorative panels and a projecting two-story stone bay.

The building was added to the National Register of Historic Places in 1988.
