= James J. Sullivan School =

- U.S. National Register of Historic Places
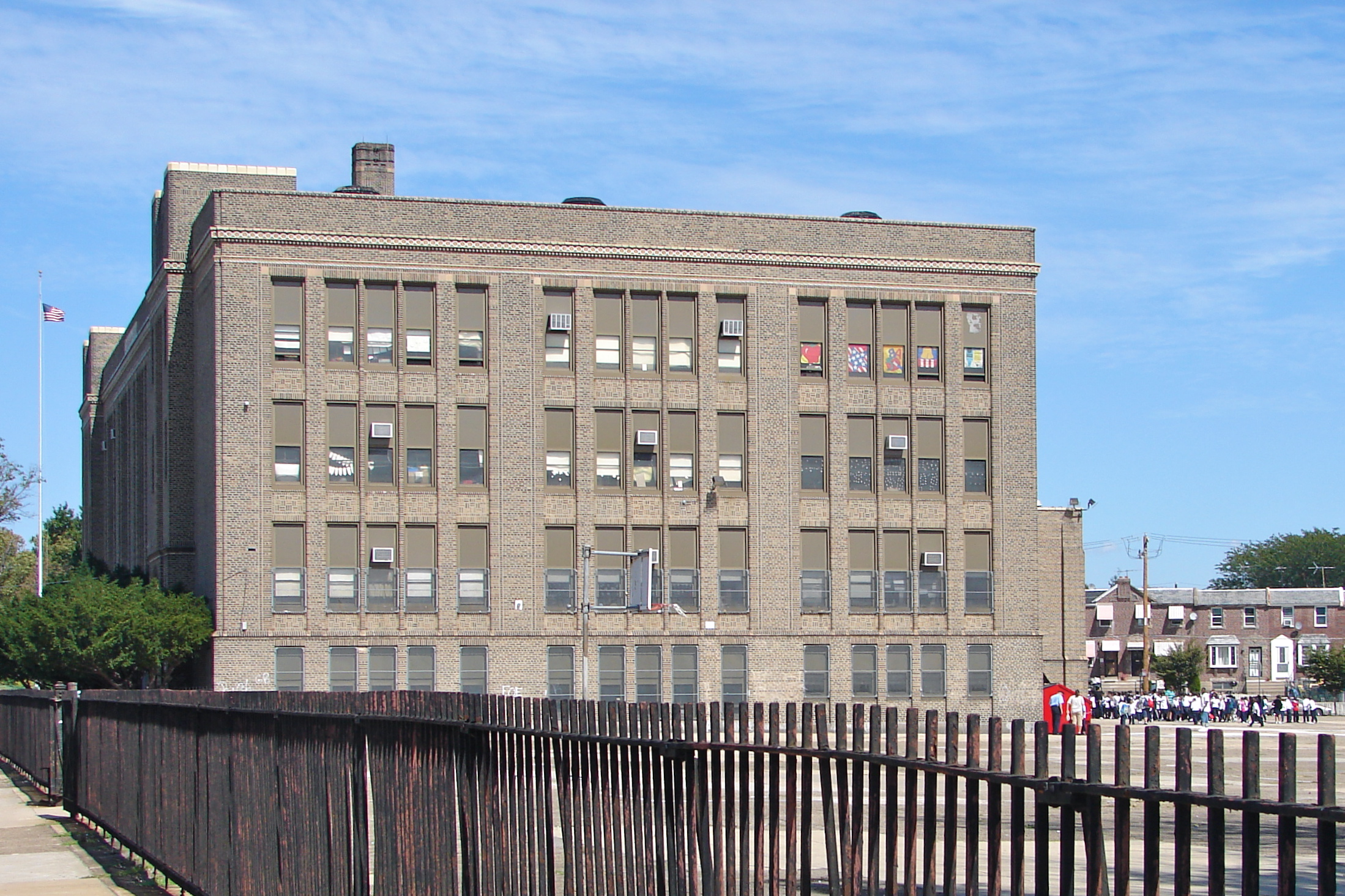
- James J. Sullivan School, September 2010

- Location within Philadelphia Location within Pennsylvania Location within the United States
- Location: 5300 Ditman St., Philadelphia, Pennsylvania, United States
- Coordinates: 40°00′58″N 75°04′01″W
- Area: 2.1 acres (0.85 ha)
- Built: 1929–1930
- Architect: Irwin T. Catharine,
- Architectural style: Art Deco
- MPS: Philadelphia Public Schools TR
- NRHP reference No.: 88002327
- Added to NRHP: November 18, 1988

The James J. Sullivan School is a historic elementary school that is located in the Frankford neighborhood of Philadelphia, Pennsylvania, United States.

It is part of the School District of Philadelphia, and was added to the National Register of Historic Places in 1988.

== History and architectural features ==
The building was designed by Irwin T. Catharine and built between 1929 and 1930. It is a three-story, eight-bay, yellow brick building which sits on a raised basement. It was designed in the Art Deco style, and features an arched entryway with terra cotta trim and pilasters, a terra cotta cornice, and brick parapet.
