= Philadelphia Military Academy =

Location
- 2118 N. 13th St; Philadelphia, Pennsylvania 19122; United States; 39°59′09″N 75°09′16″W

Information
- Type: Public, military high school
- Established: c. September 2005
- Status: Open
- School district: School District of Philadelphia
- Principal: Kristian Ali
- Grades: 9–12
- Website: pma.philasd.org
- James Elverson Jr. School
- U.S. National Register of Historic Places
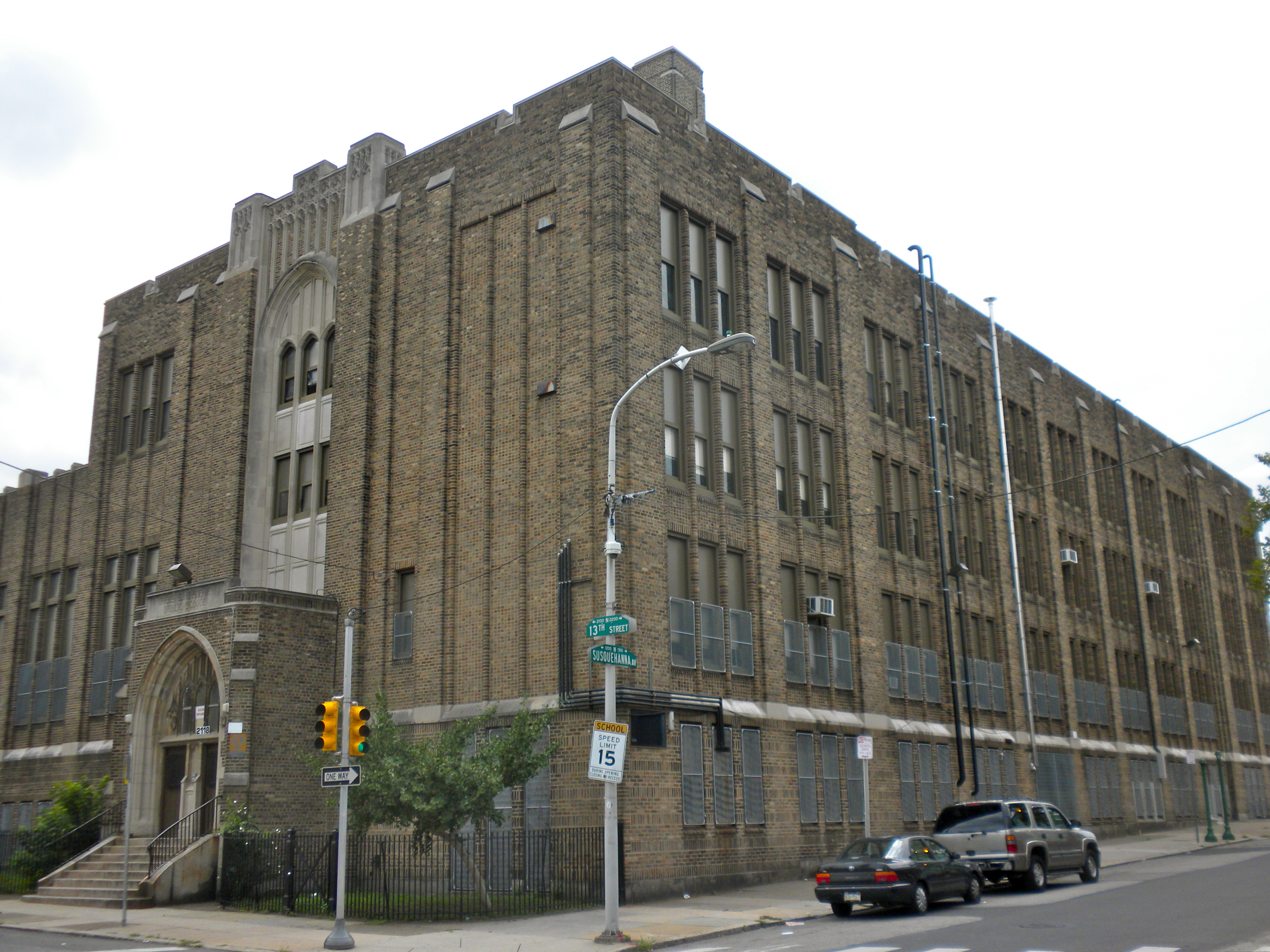
- James Elverson Jr. School, August 2010
- Area: 2.5 acres (1.0 ha)
- Built: 1929–1930
- Architect: Irwin T. Catharine
- Architectural style: Late Gothic Revival
- MPS: Philadelphia Public Schools TR
- NRHP reference No.: 88002231
- Added to NRHP: November 18, 1988

The Philadelphia Military Academy (PMA) is a military school that is located in North Philadelphia, Pennsylvania. The school opened for the 2004–2005 school year as the Philadelphia Military Academy at Leeds in the East Mt. Airy neighborhood of Philadelphia, with an enrollment of 157 ninth grade cadets.

The academy was housed at the Leeds Middle School. A second version of the program was housed at James Elverson Jr. School during the 2005–2006 school year.

This site is the current location of the school after a merger in the latter years. PMA is also known for earning its HUD aka honor unit with distinction directly from the army in 2022.

This school building was added to the National Register of Historic Places in 1988.

== Program ==
The academy is a special admission school. Like other military schools, students must adhere to the JROTC program. The academy is part of a growing trend, in Philadelphia and other cities, of military schools that are part of the public school system.

Students in the military academy wear uniforms every day and are always expected to observe military courtesy, including addressing their teachers with "sir" or "ma'am." However students are not obligated to enlist after graduation.

== Building ==
The school is housed in the former James Elverson Jr. School building, which is located in the Templetown neighborhood of Philadelphia, Pennsylvania. Designed by Irwin T. Catharine and built between 1929 and 1930, it is a three-story, eleven-bay bay, brick building that sits on a raised basement. It was designed in the Late Gothic Revival-style. An addition was built in 1954. It features a projecting central entrance pavilion, brick piers, and a castellated parapet. It was named for James Elverson, publisher of The Philadelphia Inquirer.

The building was added to the National Register of Historic Places in 1988.
