= Joseph H. Brown Elementary School =

- U.S. National Register of Historic Places
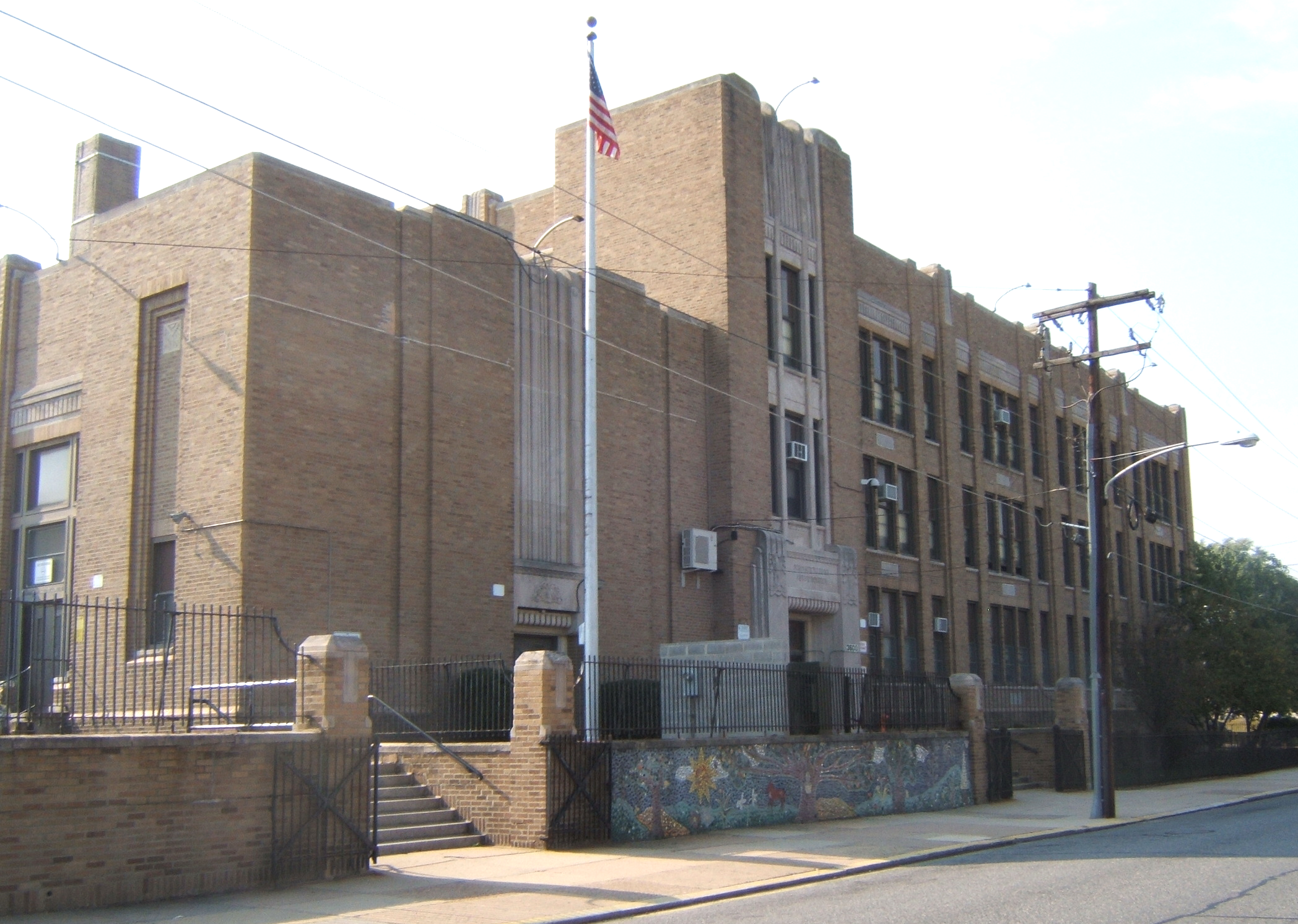
- Joseph H. Brown School, September 2010

- Location within Philadelphia Location within Pennsylvania Location within the United States
- Location: 3600 Stanwood St., Philadelphia, Pennsylvania
- Coordinates: 40°02′37″N 75°01′29″W
- Built: 1937
- Architect: Irwin T. Catharine
- Architectural style: Moderne
- NRHP reference No.: 88002250
- Added to NRHP: November 18, 1988

Joseph H. Brown Elementary School is an elementary school on Frankford Avenue at Stanwood Street in Holmesburg, in the Northeast Philadelphia area of Philadelphia, Pennsylvania, currently serving students from kindergarten to eighth grade. It is part of the School District of Philadelphia.

The current school building was constructed in 1937, replacing an earlier building on the same site. The school building was designed by Irwin T. Catharine, then the Philadelphia School District's main architect, and is an exemplar of the Art Deco and Moderne schools of architecture.

== School uniforms ==
Students of this elementary school are required to wear school uniforms.

== History ==
Before 1973, J.H. Brown included grades K through 8. With the opening of Austin Meehan Middle School, grades 7 and 8 were moved from Brown School.And then added back in later years

Principals:

- Ruth Brown to 1978
- Sarah Peters to 1987
- Kara Teachous to 1999
- Ellen Denofa to 2010

Joseph Brown students go on to Austin Meehan Middle.

All persons assigned to Meehan are zoned to Abraham Lincoln High School.
