= Board of Education Building (Philadelphia) =

- U.S. National Register of Historic Places
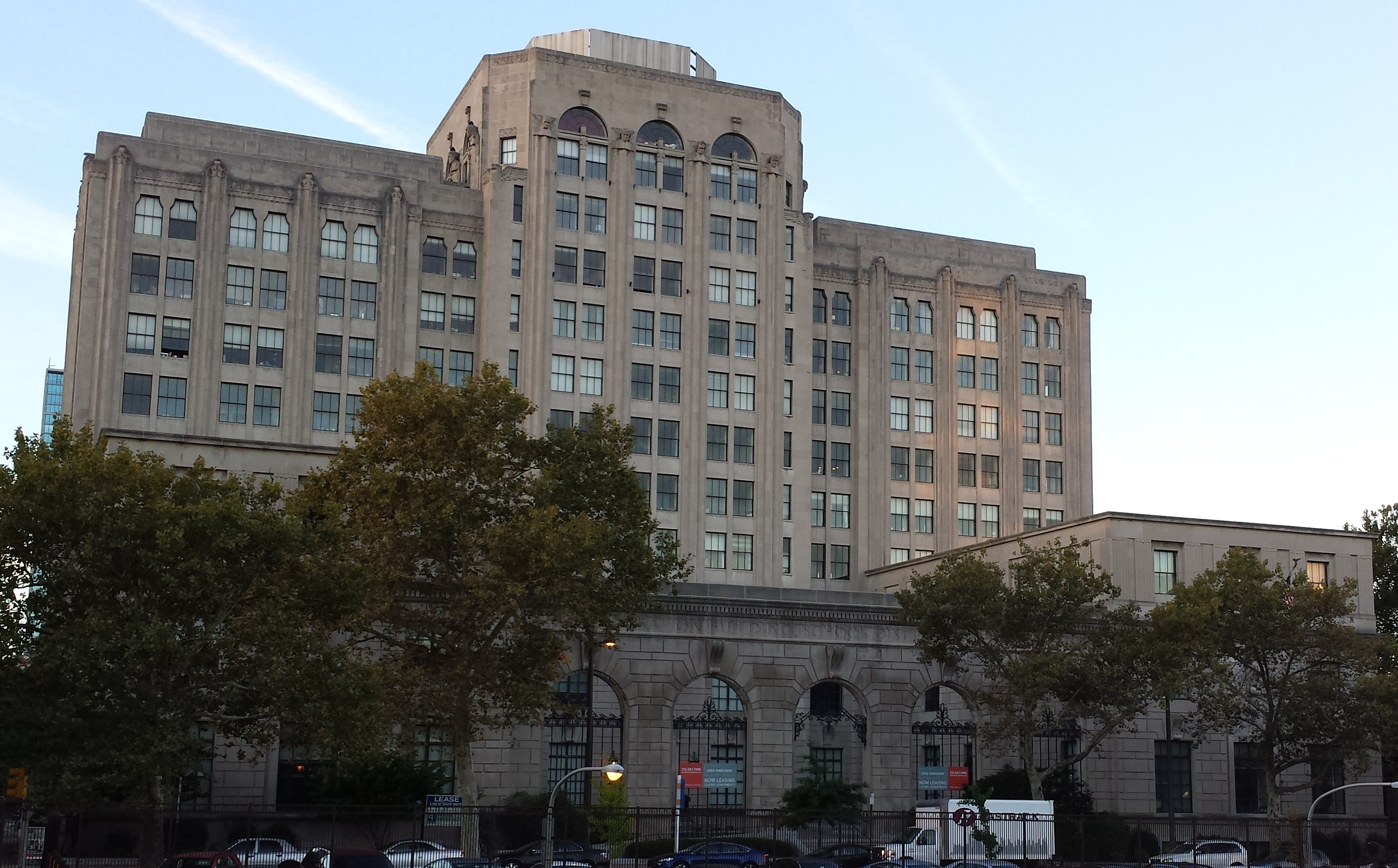
- Location: 21st St. and Benjamin Franklin Pkwy., Philadelphia, Pennsylvania
- Coordinates: 39°57′32″N 75°10′32″W
- Area: less than one acre
- Built: 1930
- Architect: Irwin T. Catharine; Jules A. Melidon
- Architectural style: Classical Revival, Moderne, Neo-Classical
- NRHP reference No.: 83002266
- Added to NRHP: August 25, 1983

The Board of Education Building, also known as the Board of Education Administration Building, is a historic building in the Logan Square neighborhood of Philadelphia. As the long-time headquarters of what is now the School District of Philadelphia, it was a center of the city's educational system. It was completed in 1932. In recent years, it has been converted to residential use.

The Board of Education Building was added in 1983 to the National Register of Historic Places.

== Design ==
The building's design was selected by jury. Its style is a combination of Art Deco and Classical Revival, commonly known as Moderne. It was part of an early revitalization scheme for the city that resulted in the building of the Benjamin Franklin Parkway.

Bas relief sculptures on educational themes are incorporated into the building. These were first sketched by the architect Irwin T. Catharine, then executed in plaster by Jules Melidon, before being sculpted by the stone cutters. Melidon reportedly was in Europe while they were being sculpted and installed, and sued Catharine and the Board of Education upon his return.

The four columns on each side of the central tower are topped by busts of great thinkers, educators, and statesmen:

- North side: Daniel Webster, Benjamin Franklin, Thaddeus Stevens, William Shakespeare
- South side: Alexander Graham Bell, Thomas Jefferson, Abraham Lincoln, John Marshall
- East side: Robert Fulton, Russell Conwell, Horace Mann, William Penn
- West side: Isaac Newton, George Washington, Bayard Taylor, Stephen Girard

== Gallery ==
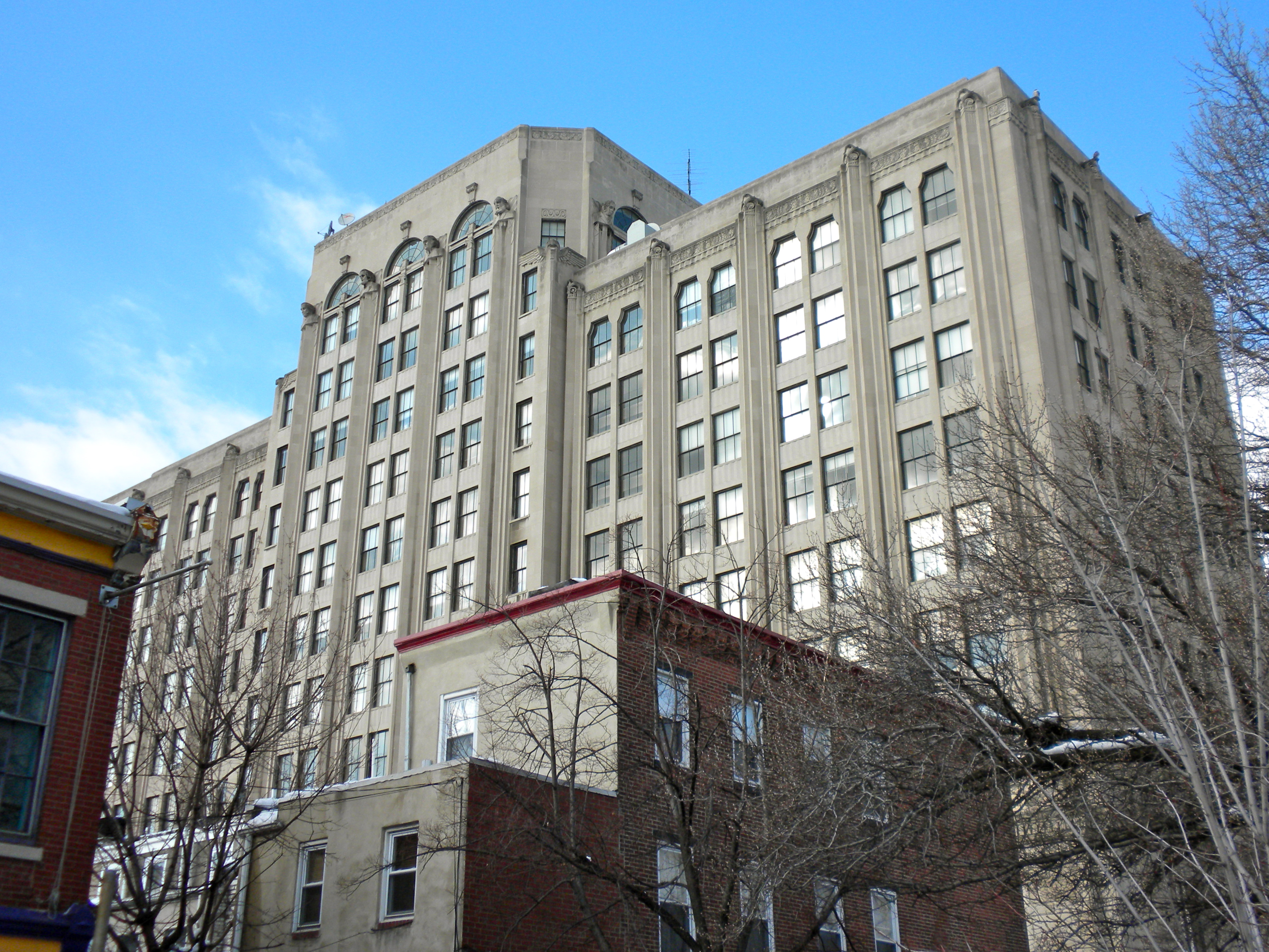
View from southeast

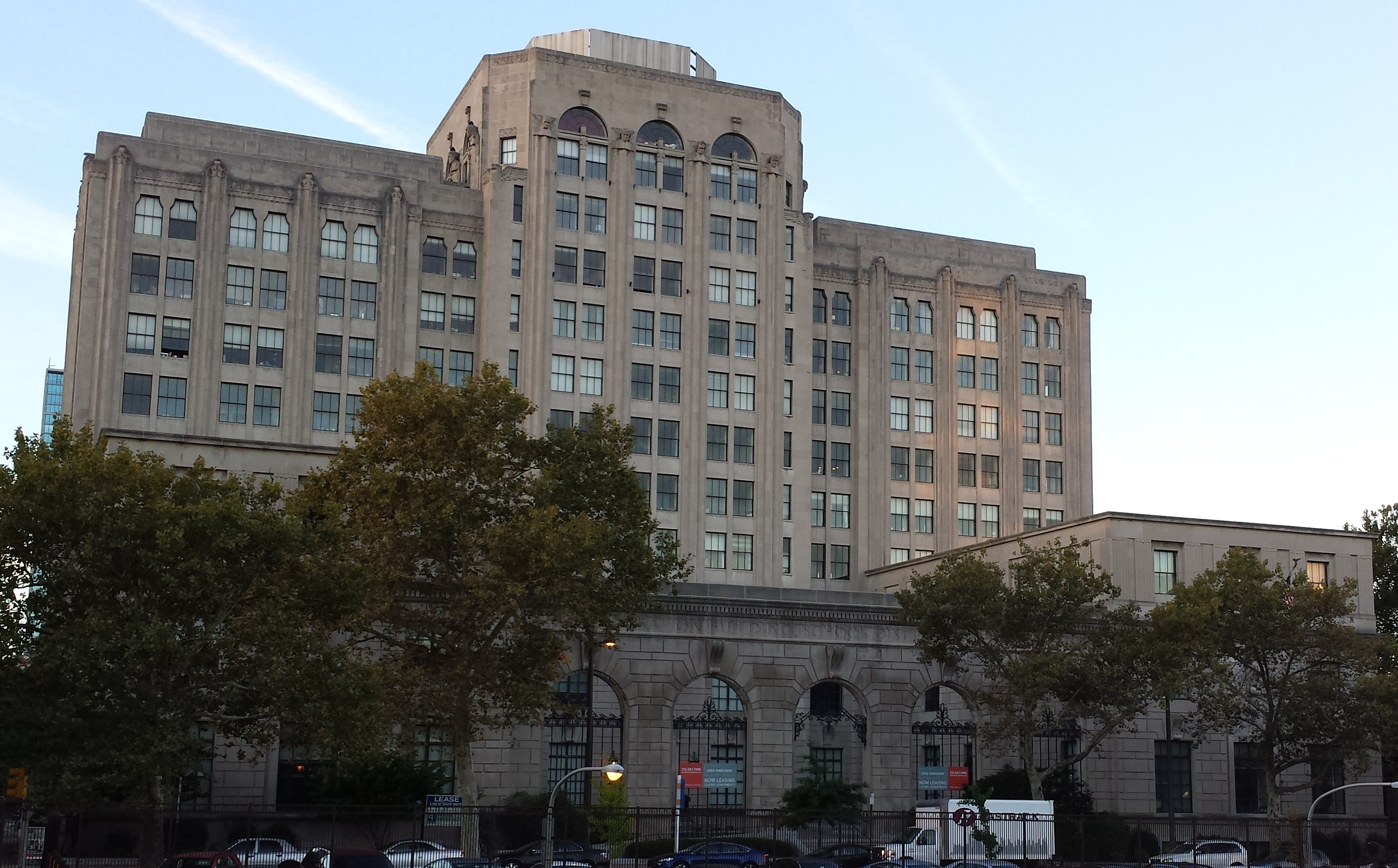
North elevation and main entrance

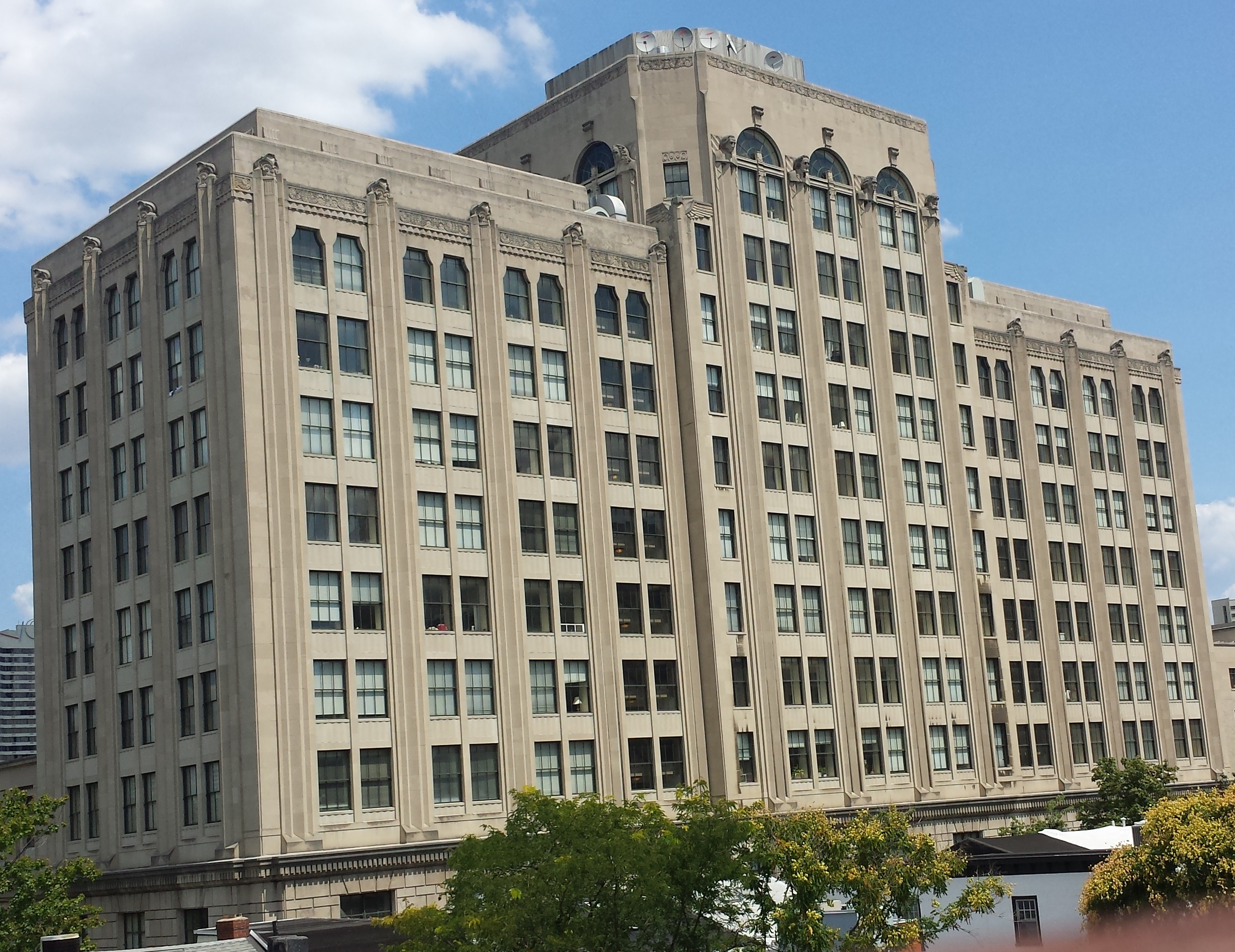
View from southwest

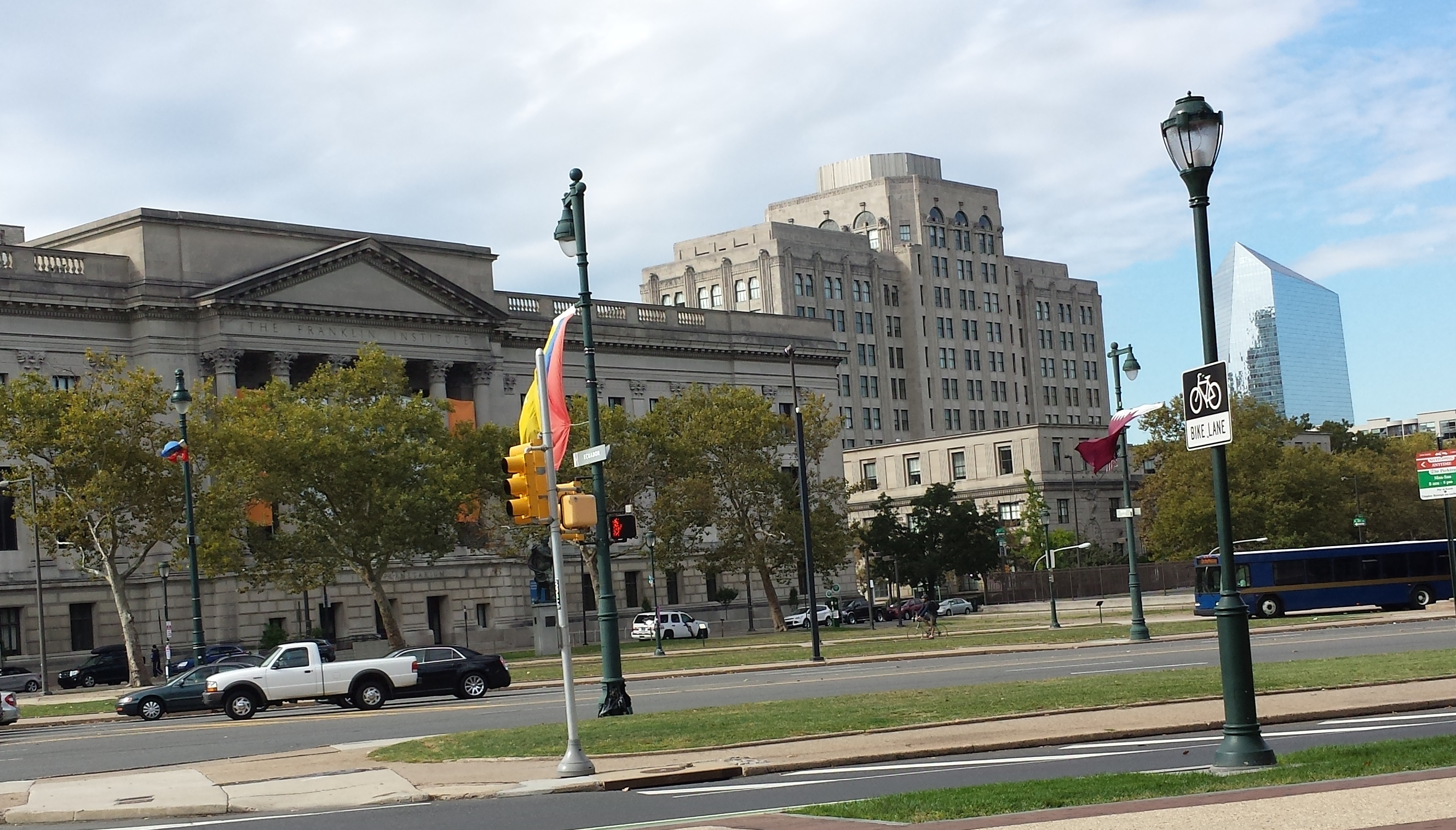
View from across the Benjamin Franklin Parkway, showing the building in context between the Franklin Institute and the Cira Centre

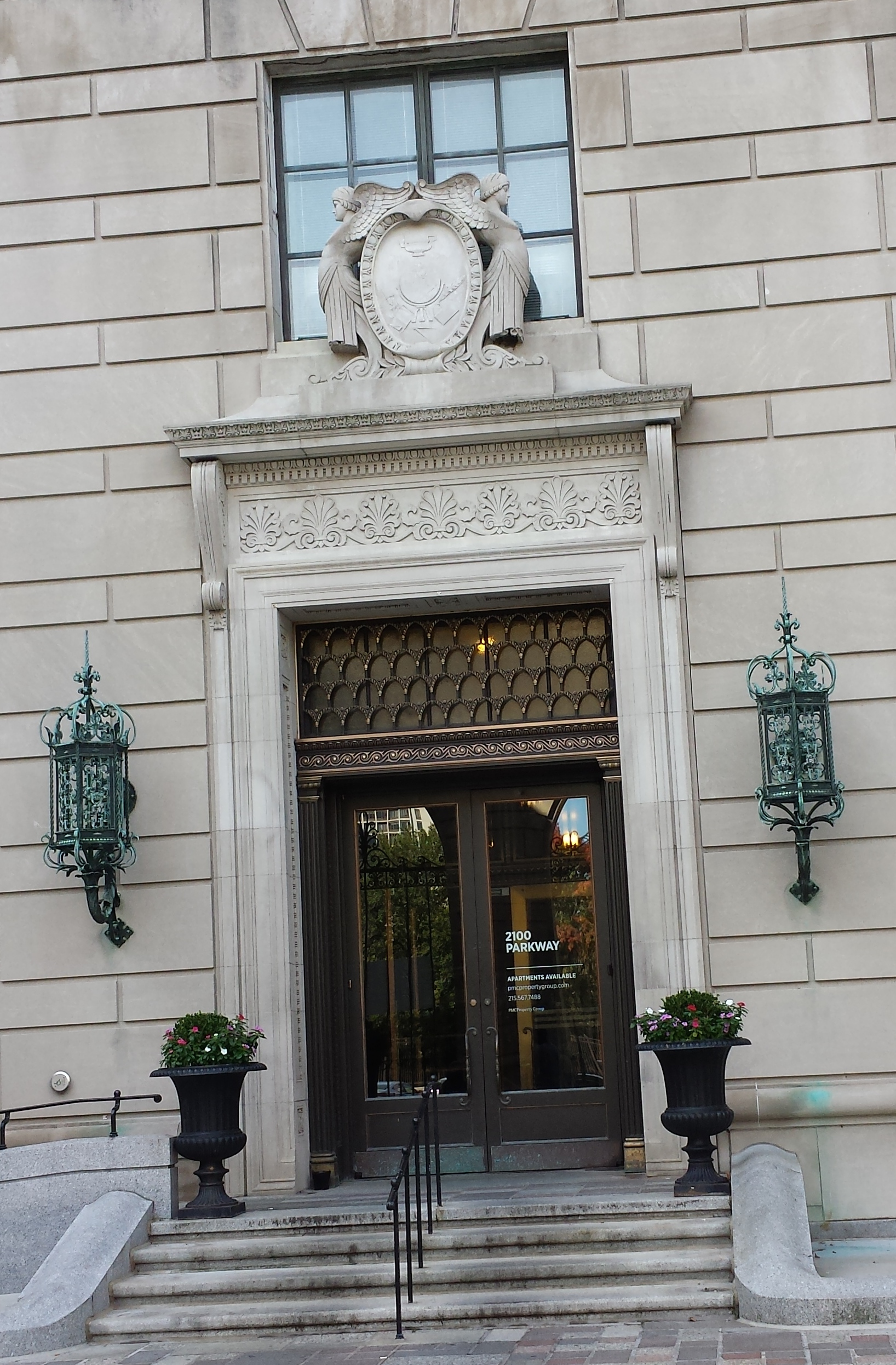
Main entrance

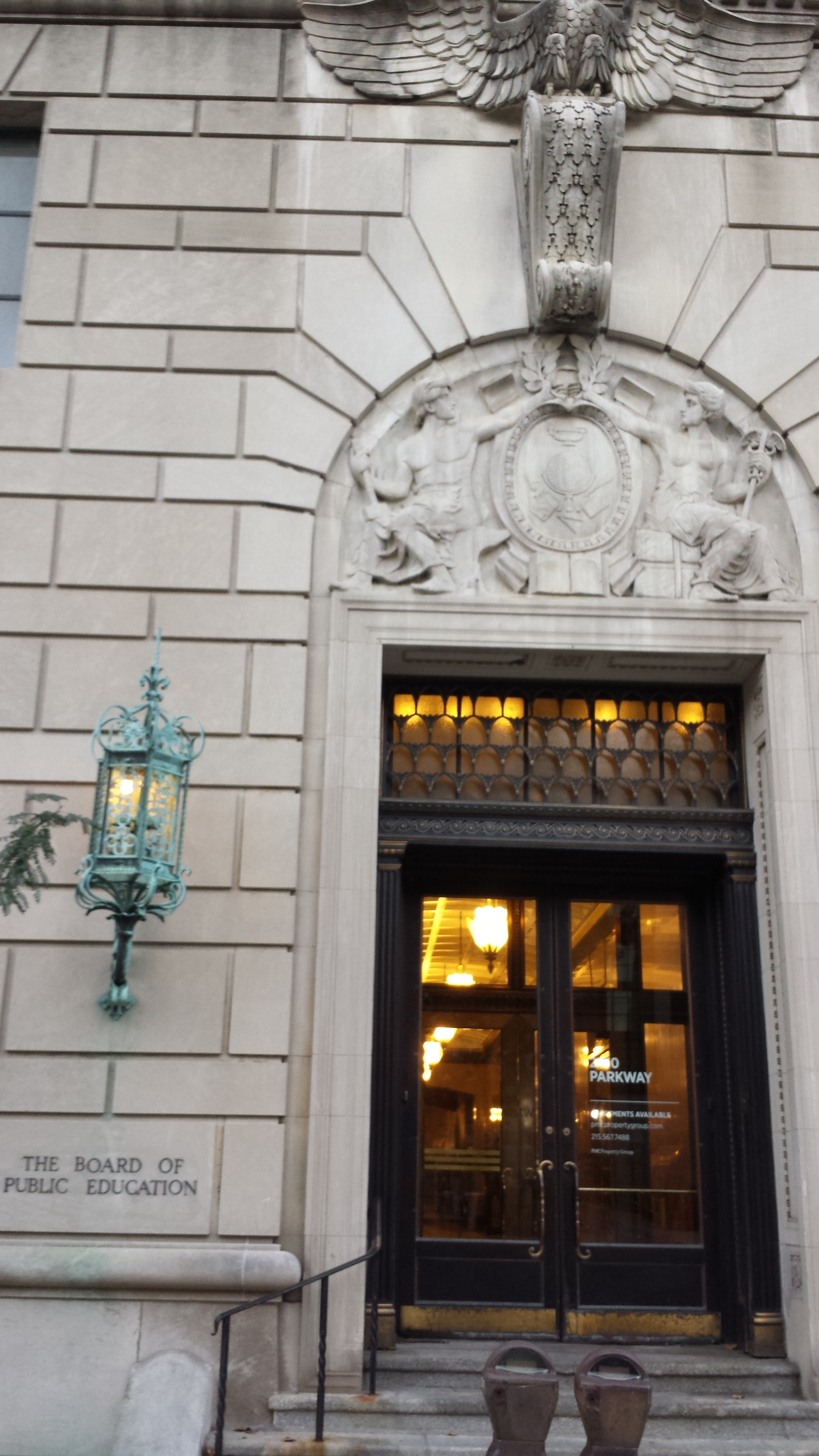
21st Street entrance

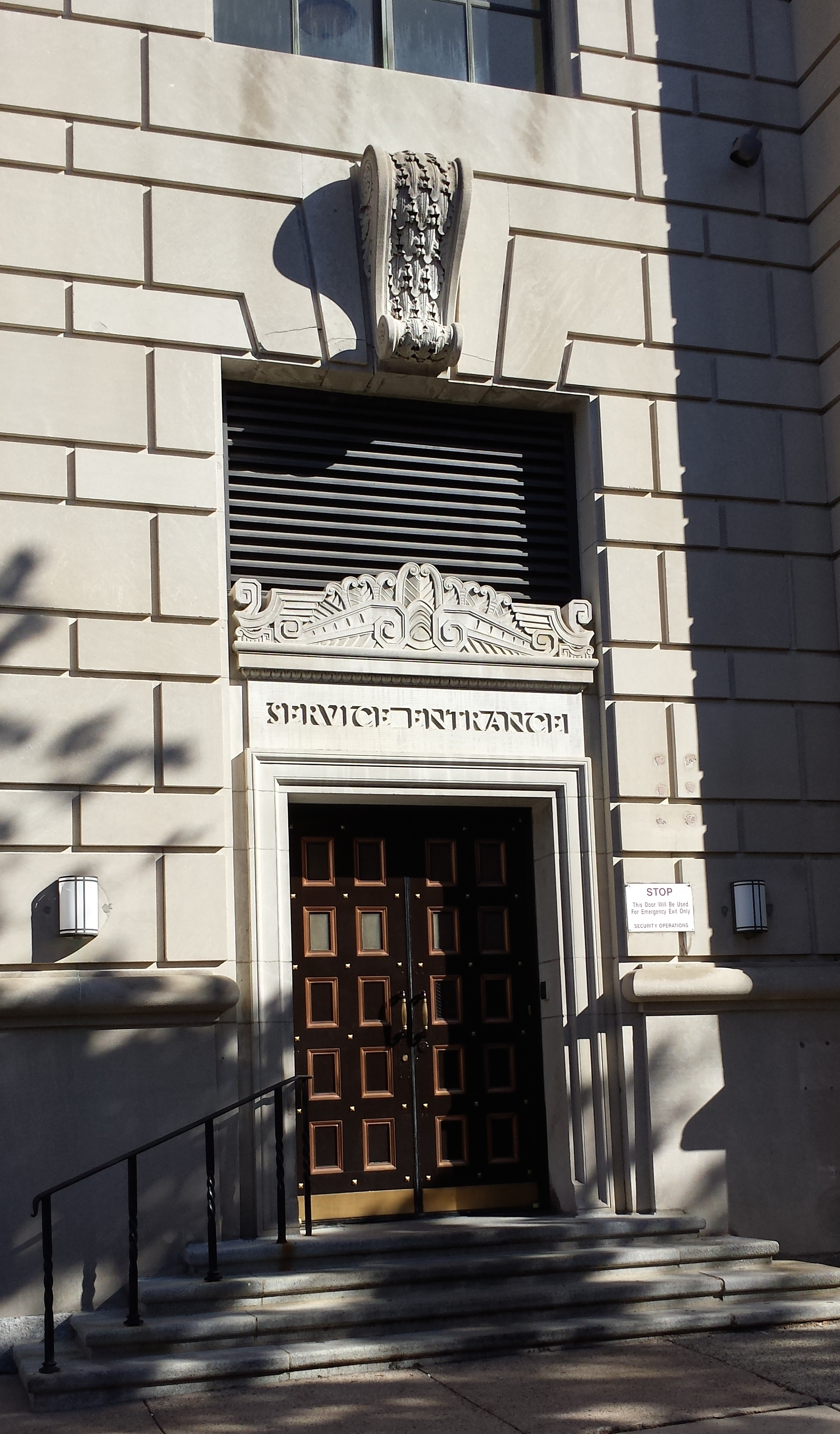
The designation of this door onto Spring Street a "service entrance" is quite literally carved in stone.

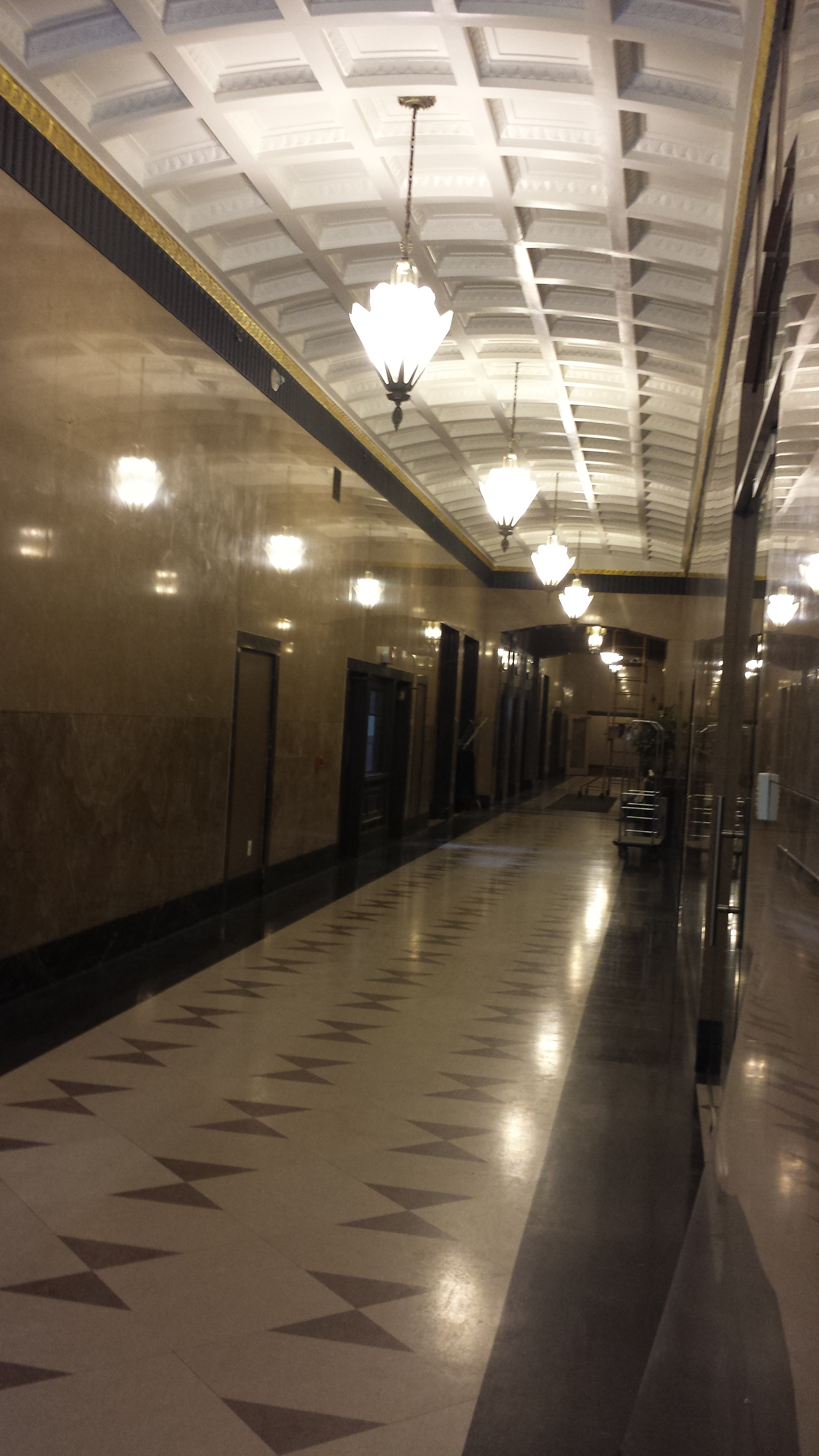
Interior hallway
