= Clara Barton School (Philadelphia) =

Historic building in Pennsylvania, U.S.

- U.S. National Register of Historic Places
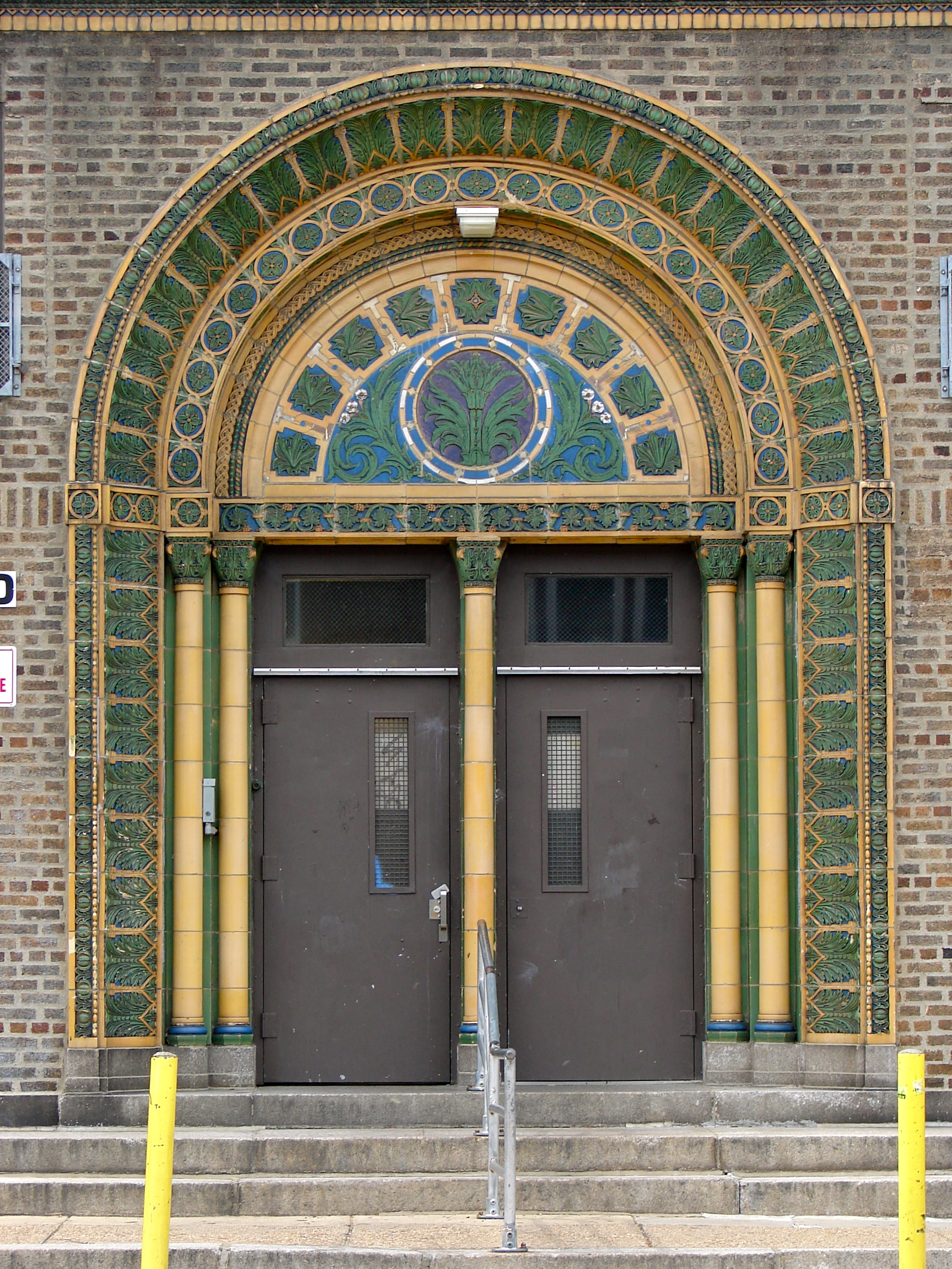
- Clara Barton School entrance, September 2010

- Location within Philadelphia Location within Pennsylvania Location within the United States
- Location: 300 E. Wyoming Ave., Philadelphia, Pennsylvania
- Coordinates: 40°1′13″N 75°7′12″W
- Area: 2 acres (0.81 ha)
- Built: 1924–1925
- Architect: Catharine, Irwin T.
- Architectural style: Art Deco
- MPS: Philadelphia Public Schools TR
- NRHP reference No.: 88002242
- Added to NRHP: November 18, 1988

Clara Barton School is a historic school building located in the Feltonville neighborhood of Philadelphia. It was designed by Irwin T. Catharine and built in 1924–1925. It is a three-story, eight-bay, yellow brick building in the Art Deco-style. It features an entrance with decorative terra cotta panels and a terra cotta cornice. It was named for American Red Cross founder Clara Barton (1821–1912).

It was added to the National Register of Historic Places in 1988.
