= Joseph Pennell School =

- U.S. National Register of Historic Places
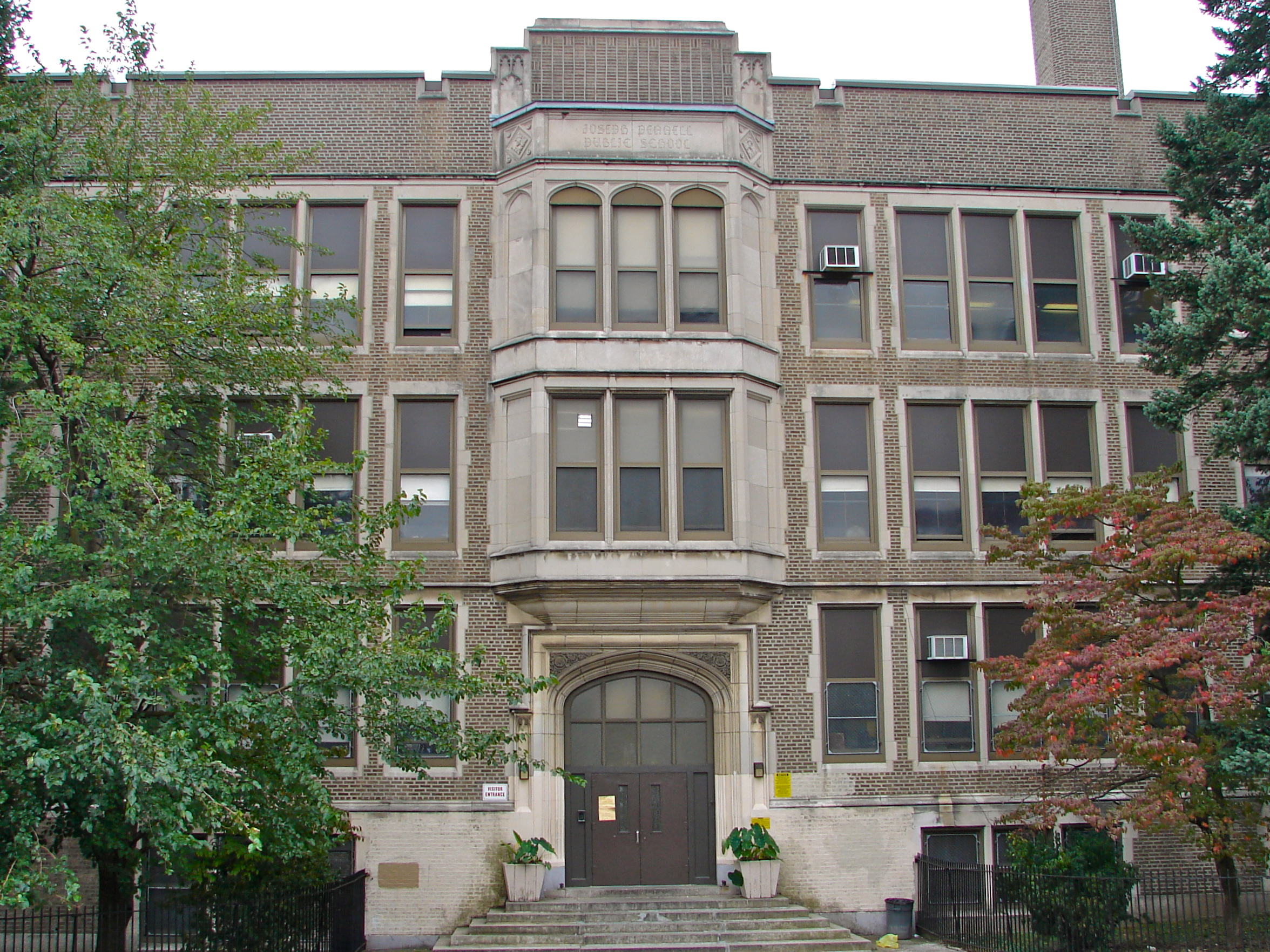
- Joseph Pennell School, September 2010

- Location within Philadelphia Location within Pennsylvania Location within the United States
- Location: 1800 Nedro St., Philadelphia, Pennsylvania
- Coordinates: 40°02′36″N 75°09′03″W
- Area: 1.9 acres (0.77 ha)
- Built: 1926–1927
- Architect: Irwin T. Catharine
- Architectural style: Late Gothic Revival
- MPS: Philadelphia Public Schools TR
- NRHP reference No.: 88002309
- Added to NRHP: November 18, 1988

The Joseph Pennell Elementary School is a historic, American elementary school in the Belfield neighborhood of Philadelphia, Pennsylvania. It is part of the School District of Philadelphia.

The building was added to the National Register of Historic Places in 1988.

== History and architectural features ==
This building was designed by architect Irwin T. Catharine and built between 1926 and 1927. It is a three-story brick building, nine bays wide with projecting end bays, and was designed in the Late Gothic Revival style. An addition was built in 1954. The school is named for illustrator Joseph Pennell (1857–1926).
