= Lydia Darrah School =

- U.S. National Register of Historic Places
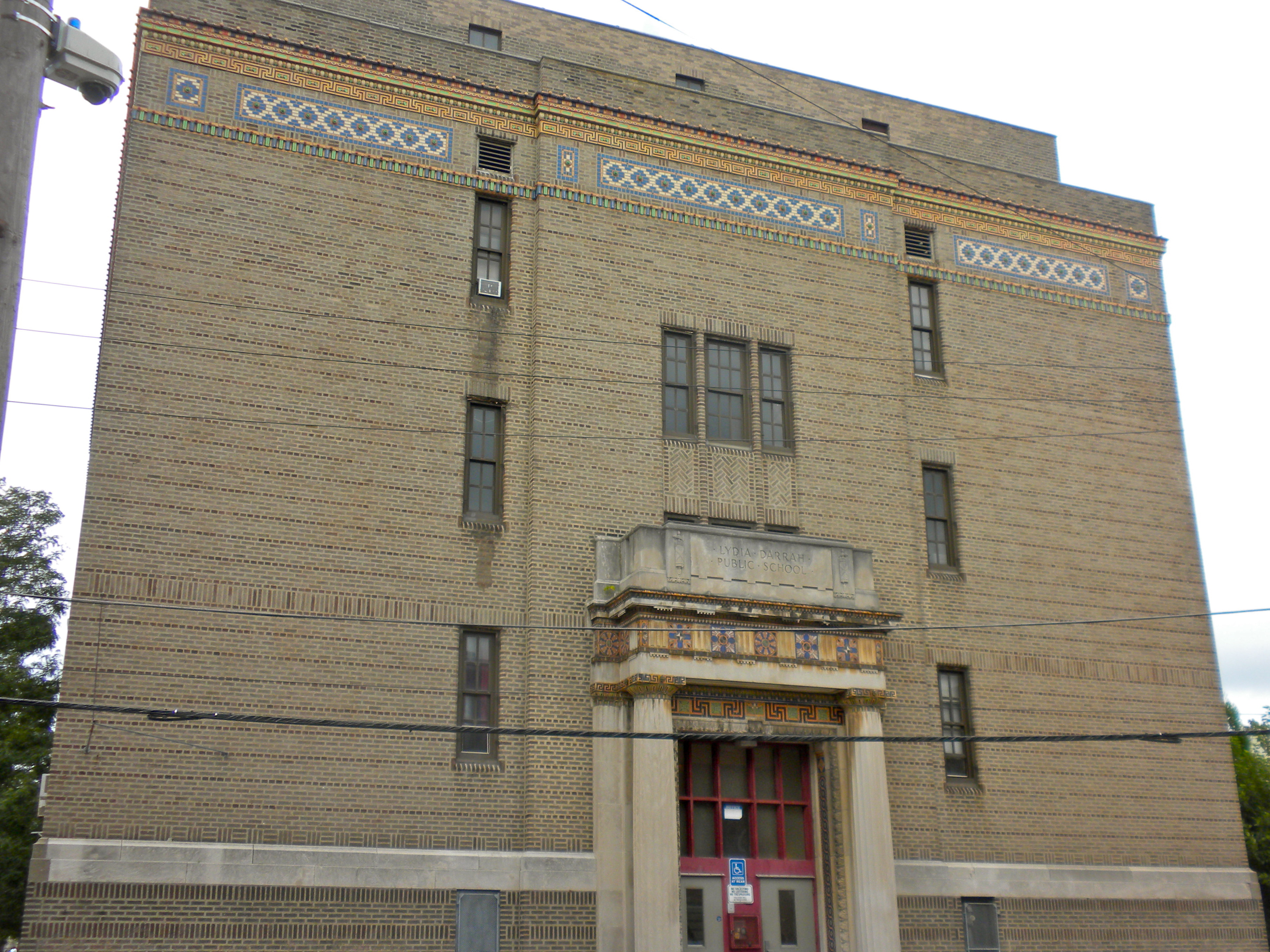
- Lydia Darrah School, August 2010

- Location within Philadelphia Location within Pennsylvania Location within the United States
- Location: 708-732 N. Seventeenth St., Philadelphia, Pennsylvania
- Coordinates: 39°58′05″N 75°09′56″W
- Area: less than one acre
- Built: 1926-1927
- Architect: Catharine, Irwin T.
- Architectural style: Moderne
- MPS: Philadelphia Public Schools TR
- NRHP reference No.: 86003269
- Added to NRHP: December 4, 1986

The Lydia Darrah School is an historic school building which is located in the Francisville neighborhood of Philadelphia, Pennsylvania.

It was added to the National Register of Historic Places in 1986.

== History and architectural features ==
Designed by Irwin T. Catharine, this historic structure was built between 1926 and 1927. It is a three-story, rectangular, brick building with a raised basement, which was created in the Moderne-style. It features terracotta trim, fluted columns, and an undulating parapet wall. It was named for Revolutionary War figure Lydia Darrah (1728-1789).
