= Joseph W. Catharine School =

- U.S. National Register of Historic Places
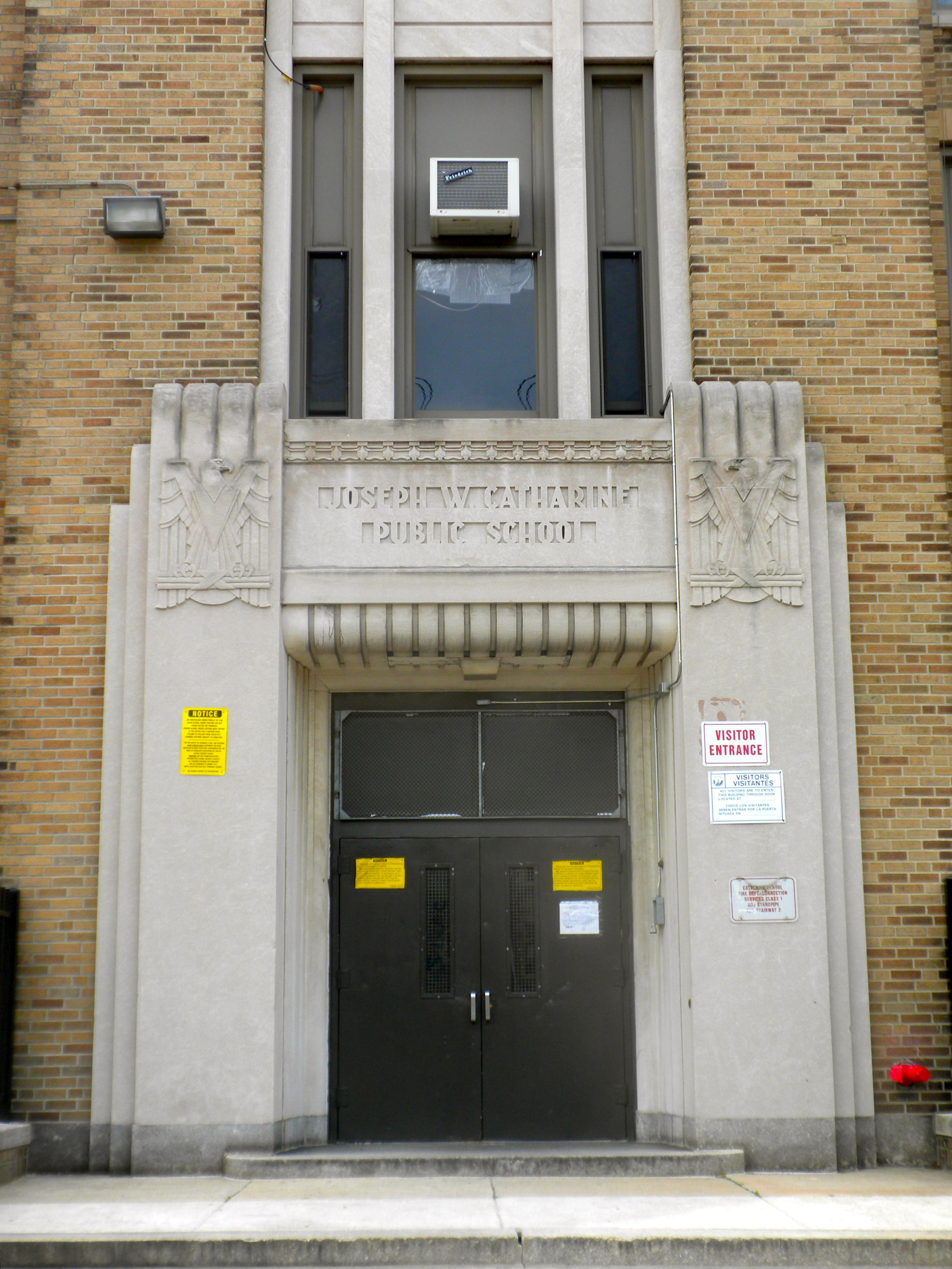
- Joseph W. Catharine School entrance, June 2010

- Location within Philadelphia Location within Pennsylvania Location within the United States
- Location: 6600 Chester Ave., Philadelphia, Pennsylvania
- Coordinates: 39°55′39″N 75°14′23″W
- Area: 2.2 acres (0.89 ha)
- Built: 1937–1938
- Built by: McCloskey & Co.
- Architect: Irwin T. Catharine
- Architectural style: Moderne
- MPS: Philadelphia Public Schools TR
- NRHP reference No.: 88002253
- Added to NRHP: November 18, 1988

Joseph W. Catharine School is a historic elementary school in the Mount Moriah neighborhood of Philadelphia. It is part of the School District of Philadelphia.

The building was designed by Irwin T. Catharine and built in 1937–1938. It is a three-story, six-bay, yellow brick structure in the Moderne-style. It features a main entrance with decorative stone surround, stone sills, and stone coping atop the building. It was added to the National Register of Historic Places in 1988.

The school is named in honor of Joseph W. Catharine, a long-time member and a president of Philadelphia's School Board who was also the father of the architect.
