= Lewis C. Cassidy School =

- U.S. National Register of Historic Places
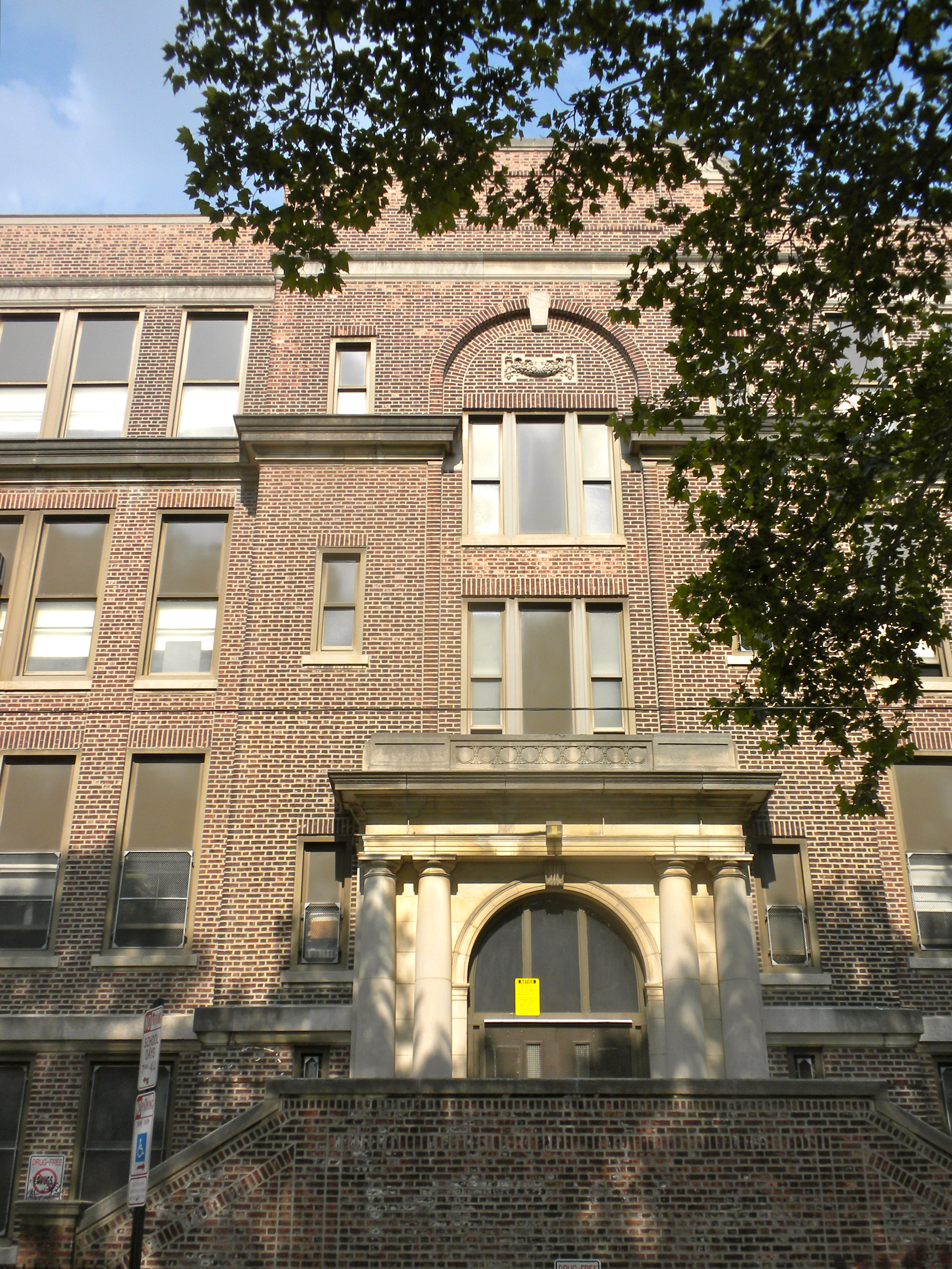
- Lewis C. Cassidy School

- Location within Philadelphia Location within Pennsylvania Location within the United States
- Location: 6523 Lansdowne Ave., Philadelphia, Pennsylvania
- Coordinates: 39°58′30″N 75°15′03″W
- Area: 1.9 acres (0.77 ha)
- Built: 1922–1924
- Built by: Sinclair & Grigg
- Architect: Irwin T. Catharine
- Architectural style: Colonial Revival
- MPS: Philadelphia Public Schools TR
- NRHP reference No.: 88002252
- Added to NRHP: November 18, 1988

The Lewis C. Cassidy Academics Plus School was a historic elementary school in the Overbrook neighborhood of Philadelphia, Pennsylvania; it was part of the School District of Philadelphia.

The building was added to the National Register of Historic Places in 1988. Demolition of the building began in September 2021.

== History and architectural features ==
This historic building was designed by Irwin T. Catharine and built between 1922 and 1924. It is a three-story, nine-bay by five-bay, brick building that sits on a raised basement. Designed in the Colonial Revival style, it features large stone arch surrounds on the first level, a projecting entrance pavilion, a double stone cornice, and a brick parapet topped by stone coping.

The building was added to the National Register of Historic Places in 1988. Demolition of the building began in September 2021. It was replaced by the $62.1 million Lewis C. Cassidy Academics Plus School, which open in fall 2024.
