= Emlen Elementary School =

- Eleanor Cope Emlen School of Practice
- U.S. National Register of Historic Places
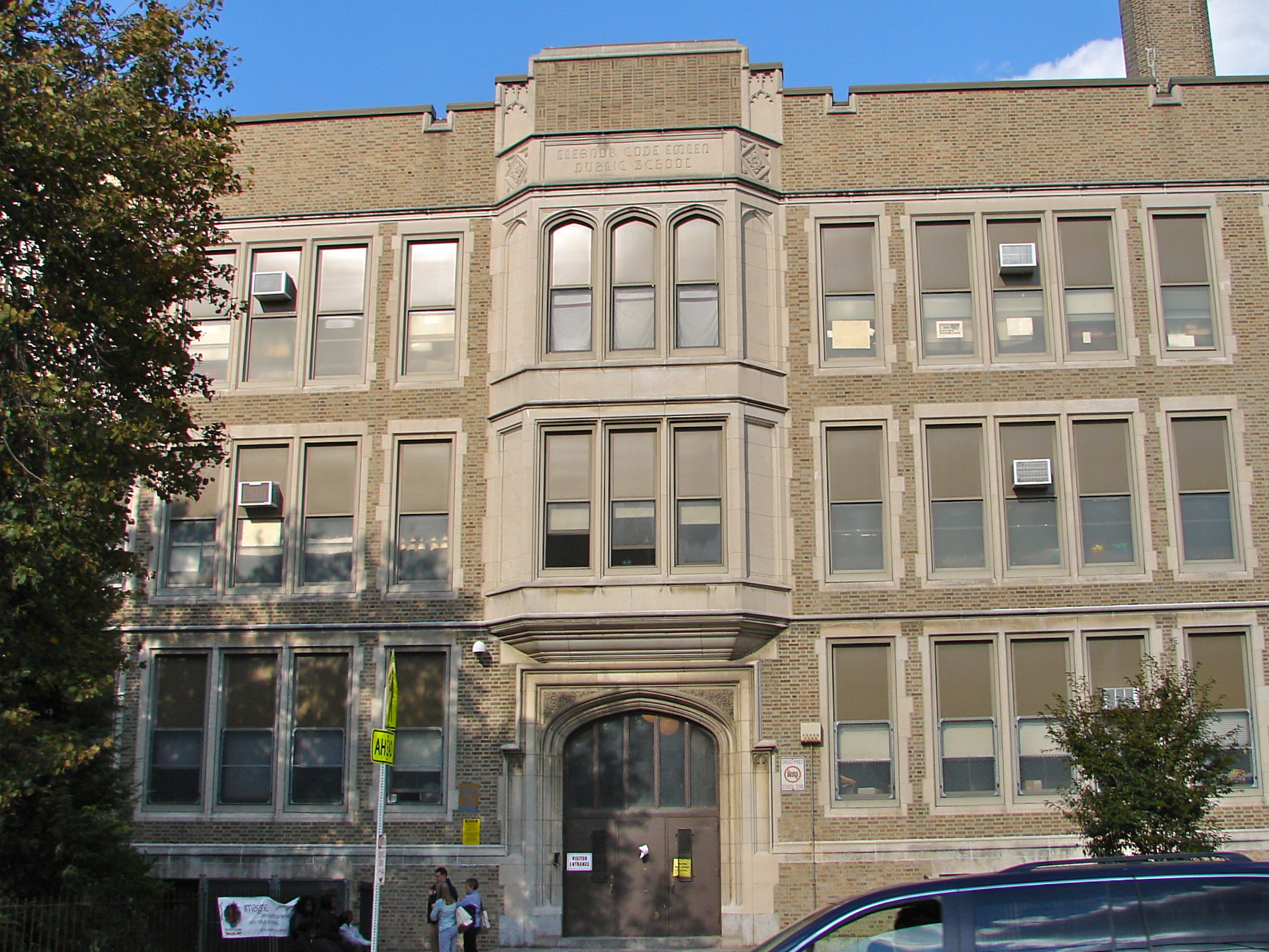
- Eleanor Cope Emlen School of Practice, October 2010

- Location within Philadelphia Location within Pennsylvania Location within the United States
- Location: 6501 Chew Ave., Philadelphia, Pennsylvania
- Coordinates: 40.0541°N 75.1783°W
- Area: 2.3 acres (0.93 ha)
- Built: 1925–1926
- Built by: Melody & Co.
- Architect: Irwin T. Catharine
- Architectural style: Late Gothic Revival
- MPS: Philadelphia Public Schools TR
- NRHP reference No.: 88002267
- Added to NRHP: November 18, 1988

Emlen Elementary School, formerly Eleanor Cope Emlen School of Practice, is a historic elementary school in the Mount Airy neighborhood of Philadelphia, Pennsylvania. It is part of the School District of Philadelphia.

The building was added to the National Register of Historic Places in 1988.

== History and features ==
The building was designed by Irwin T. Catharine and built in 1925–1926. It is a three-story, nine-bay, brick building on a raised basement in the Late Gothic Revival-style. An auditorium addition was built in 1930. It features a central two-story bay window, stone surrounds, and a crenelated parapet. It was used as an "observation school" for teacher education and training.
