= Paul Laurence Dunbar School (Philadelphia) =

- U.S. National Register of Historic Places
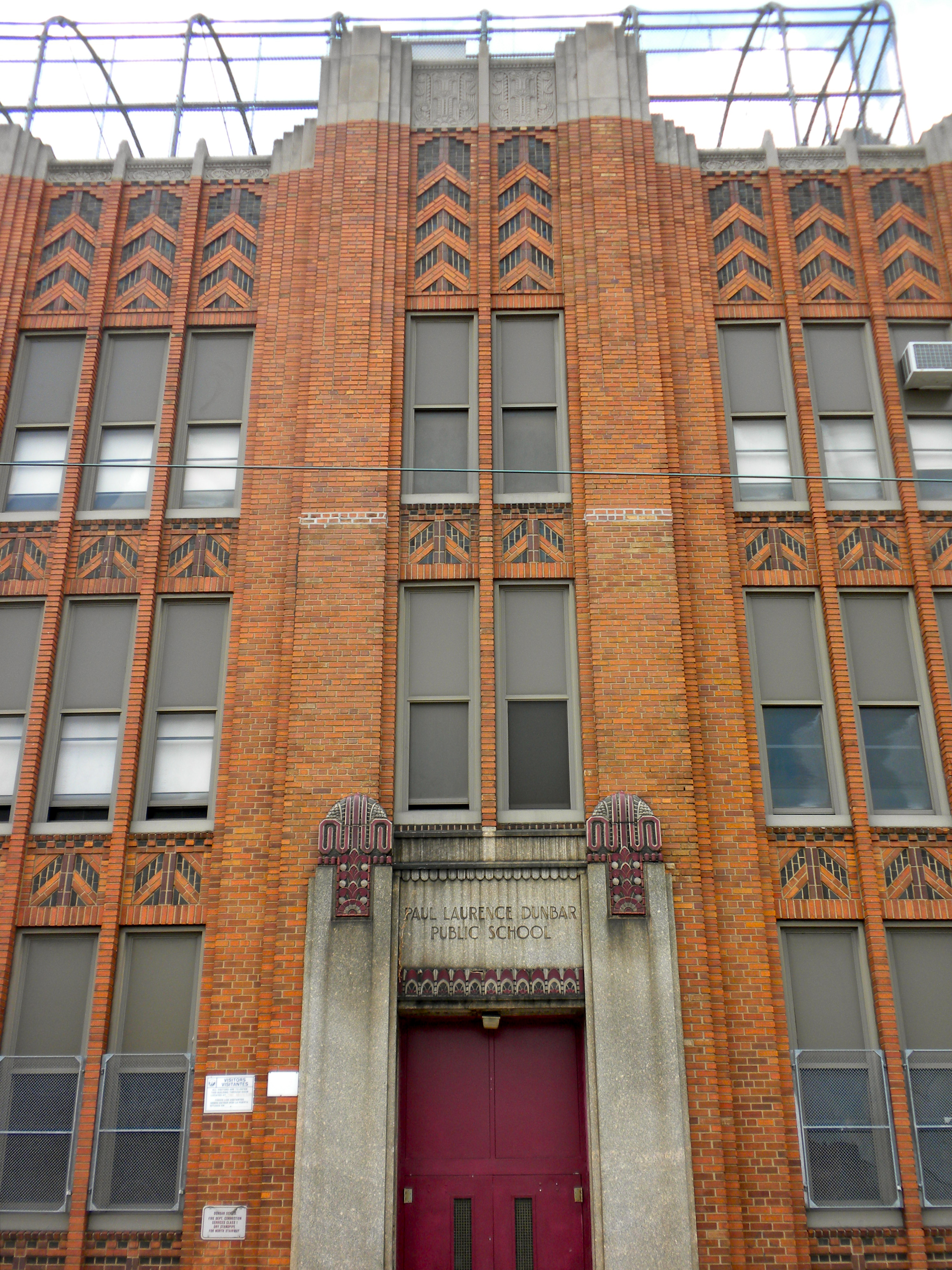
- Paul Laurence Dunbar School, August 2010

- Location within Philadelphia Location within Pennsylvania Location within the United States
- Location: 1750 N. 12th St., Philadelphia, Pennsylvania
- Coordinates: 39°58′43″N 75°9′17″W
- Area: 2 acres (0.81 ha)
- Built: 1931-1932
- Architect: Irwin T. Catharine
- Architectural style: Moderne
- MPS: Philadelphia Public Schools TR
- NRHP reference No.: 86003274
- Added to NRHP: December 4, 1986

The Paul Laurence Dunbar School is a historic, American school building in the Hartranft neighborhood of Philadelphia, Pennsylvania.

Added to the National Register of Historic Places in 1986, it is a middle school in the School District of Philadelphia.

== History and architectural features ==
Designed by Irwin T. Catharine and built between 1931 and 1932, this historic structure is a four-story, fourteen-bay, orange brick building that sits on a raised basement. Designed in the Moderne style, it features ribbon bands of windows, brick pilasters with compound capitals, and spandrel panels. It was named for African American poet and author Paul Laurence Dunbar (1872–1906).
