= Conwell Middle Magnet School =

- Russell H. Conwell School
- U.S. National Register of Historic Places
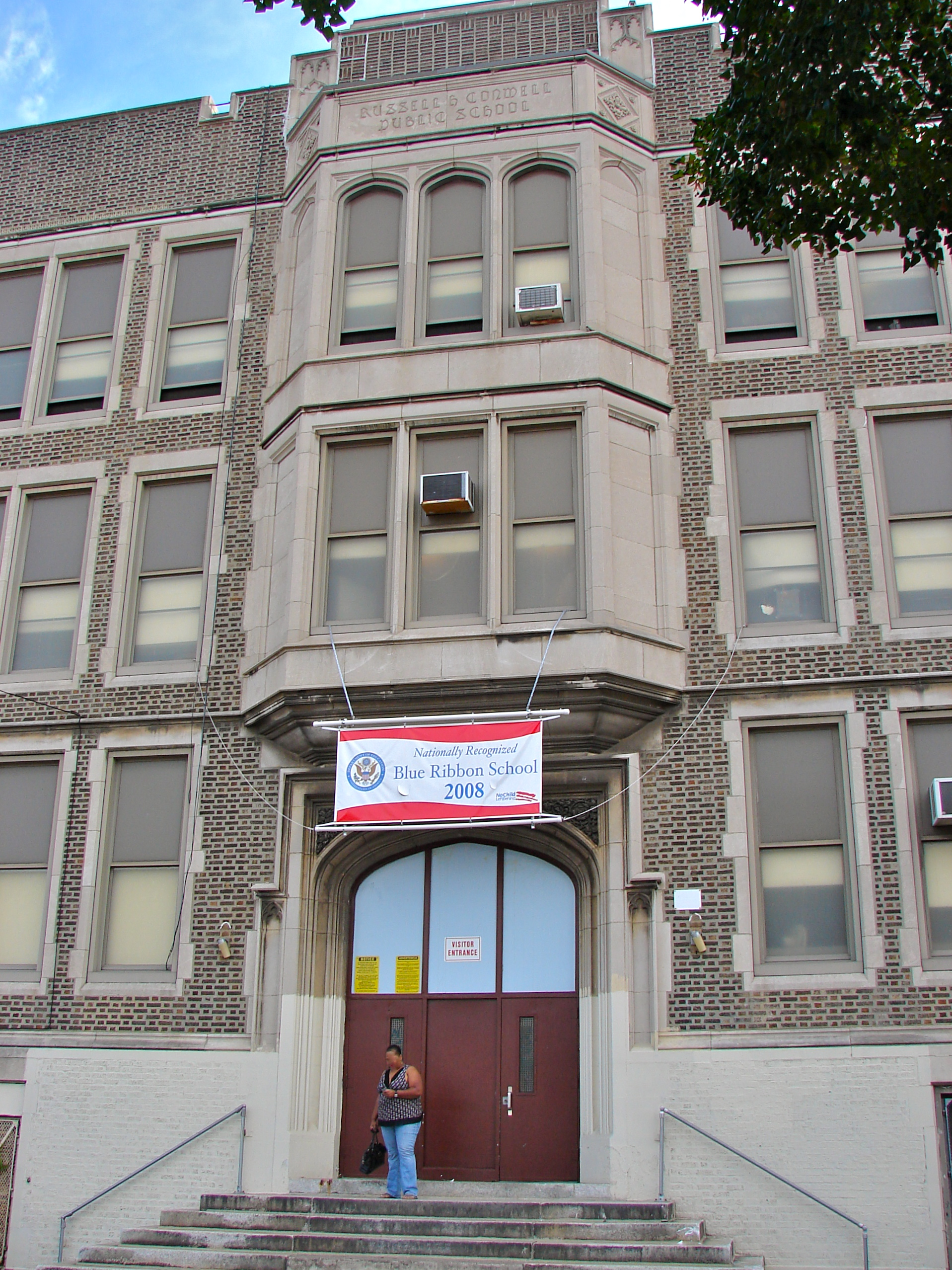
- Russell H. Conwell School, September 2010

- Location within Philadelphia Location within Pennsylvania Location within the United States
- Location: 1829-1951 E. Clearfield St., Philadelphia, Pennsylvania
- Coordinates: 39.9943°N 75.1147°W
- Area: 1.2 acres (0.49 ha)
- Built: 1925–1926
- Architect: Irwin T. Catharine
- Architectural style: Late Gothic Revival
- MPS: Philadelphia Public Schools TR
- NRHP reference No.: 88002258
- Added to NRHP: November 18, 1988

Conwell Middle Magnet School is a historic middle school located in the Kensington neighborhood of Philadelphia, Pennsylvania. It is a magnet school in the School District of Philadelphia. The building was designed by Irwin T. Catharine and built in 1925–1926. It is a three-story, nine-bay, brick building on a raised basement in the Late Gothic Revival style. It features a central arched entryway with stone surround, stone two-story bay, and carved stone panels. The school was named for Temple University founder Russell Conwell.

The building was added to the National Register of Historic Places in 1988 as the Russell H. Conwell School.
