= Henry H. Houston Elementary School =

- Henry H. Houston School
- U.S. National Register of Historic Places
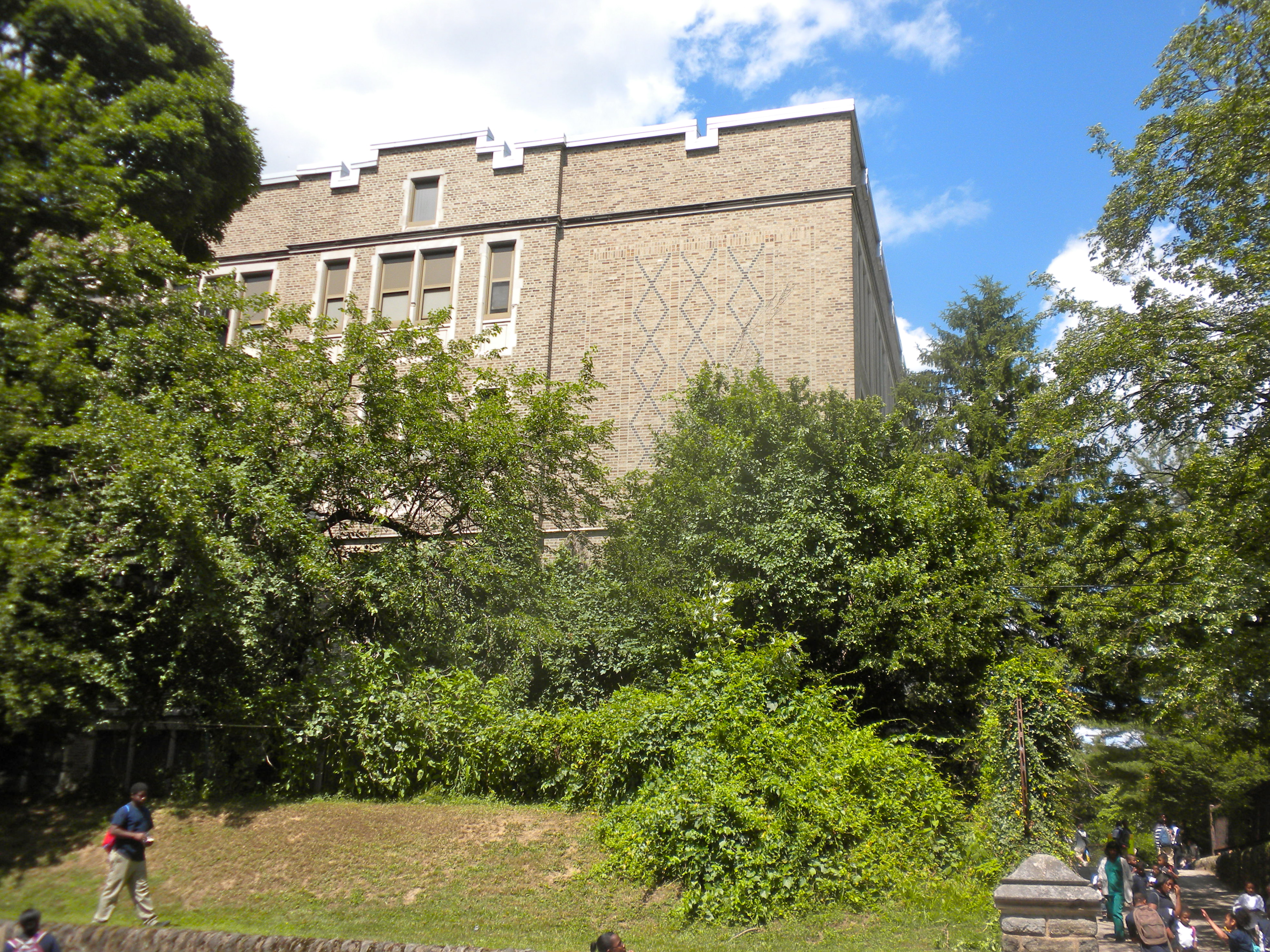
- Henry H. Houston School, June 2010

- Location within Philadelphia Location within Pennsylvania Location within the United States
- Location: 7300 Rural Ln., Philadelphia, Pennsylvania
- Coordinates: 40°03′33″N 75°11′42″W
- Area: 2.3 acres (0.93 ha)
- Built: 1926–1927
- Architect: Irwin T. Catharine
- Architectural style: Late Gothic Revival
- MPS: Philadelphia Public Schools TR
- NRHP reference No.: 88002283
- Added to NRHP: April 10, 1989

The Henry H. Houston Elementary School is a historic elementary school in the Mount Airy neighborhood of Philadelphia, Pennsylvania. It is part of the School District of Philadelphia.

The building was added to the National Register of Historic Places in 1989.

== History and architectural features ==
The building was designed by Irwin T. Catharine and built between 1926 and 1927. It is a three-story, nine-bay, brick building which sits on a raised basement. It was designed in the Late Gothic Revival-style, and features a projecting stone entryway with Tudor arched opening, stone surrounds, and a crenelated parapet.
