= James Dobson Elementary School =

- James Dobson School
- U.S. National Register of Historic Places
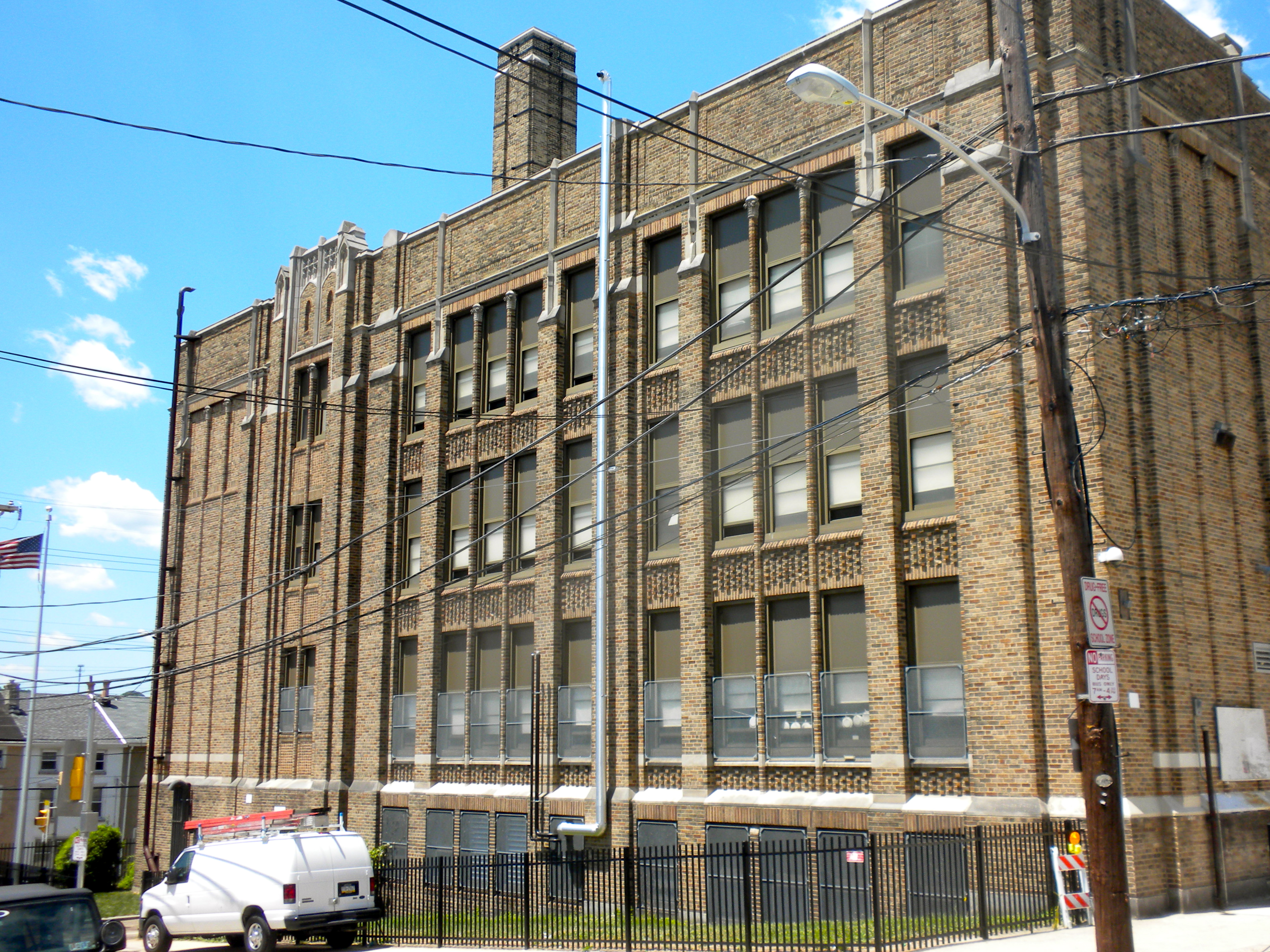
- James Dobson School, June 2010

- Location within Philadelphia Location within Pennsylvania Location within the United States
- Location: 4667 Umbria St., Philadelphia, Pennsylvania
- Coordinates: 40°01′53″N 75°13′50″W
- Area: 1 acre (0.40 ha)
- Built: 1929–1930
- Architect: Irwin T. Catharine
- Architectural style: Late Gothic Revival
- MPS: Philadelphia Public Schools TR
- NRHP reference No.: 88002264
- Added to NRHP: November 18, 1988

The James Dobson Elementary School is a historic American elementary school in the Manayunk neighborhood of Philadelphia, Pennsylvania.

It is part of the School District of Philadelphia, and was added to the National Register of Historic Places in 1988.

== History and architectural features ==
This historic building was designed by Irwin T. Catharine and built between 1929 and 1930. It is a three-story, five-bay, brick building that sits on a raised basement. It was designed in the Late Gothic Revival-style, and features an entrance pavilion with stone-trimmed arched opening, and brick piers with stone trim.
