= Richmond School (Philadelphia, Pennsylvania) =

- U.S. National Register of Historic Places
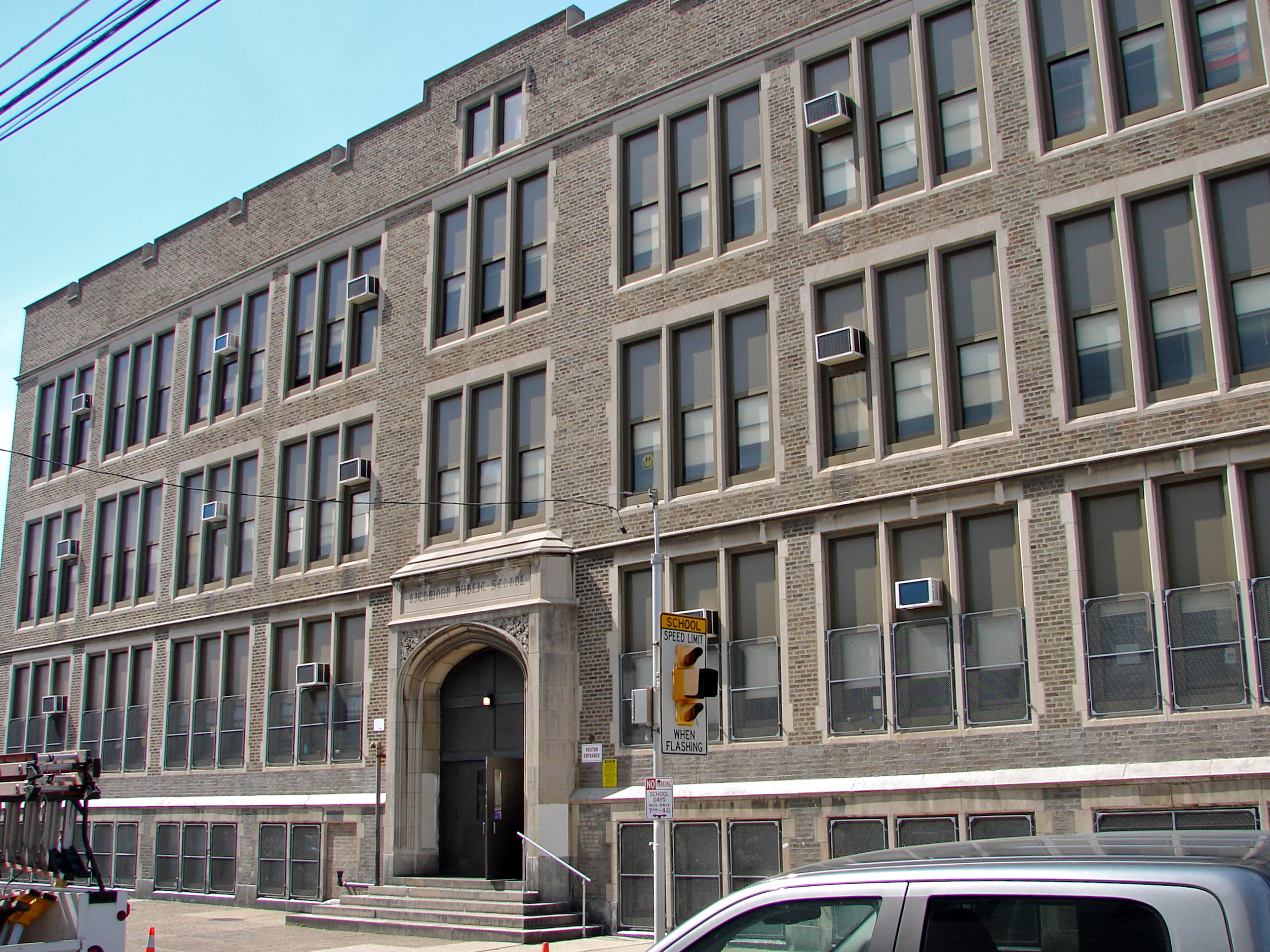
- Richmond School, September 2010

- Location within Philadelphia Location within Pennsylvania Location within the United States
- Location: 2944 Belgrade St., Philadelphia, Pennsylvania, United States
- Coordinates: 39°59′0″N 75°6′39″W
- Area: 2.2 acres (0.89 ha)
- Built: 1928–1929
- Built by: Weiss Construction Co.
- Architect: Irwin T. Catharine
- Architectural style: Late Gothic Revival
- MPS: Philadelphia Public Schools TR
- NRHP reference No.: 88002316
- Added to NRHP: November 18, 1988

Richmond Elementary School is a historic elementary school located in the Port Richmond neighborhood of Philadelphia, Pennsylvania, United States. It is part of the School District of Philadelphia.

It was added to the National Register of Historic Places in 1988.

== History and architectural features ==
This building was designed by Irwin T. Catharine and built between 1928 and 1929. It is a three-story, nine-bay, brick building at sits on a raised basement. Designed in the Late Gothic Revival style, it features a projecting stone entryway with Tudor arch, stone beltcourse and cornice, and a crenellated parapet.

The school's hierarchy structure is led with Principal Mrs. Susan Rozanski. Richmond School is a K to 5th grade school. The school has the following mission statement; "Richmond Elementary School recognizes that each child is an individual; that all children are creative; that all children need to succeed. Therefore, Richmond School respects the individual needs of children; fosters a caring and creative environment; and emphasizes the social, emotional, physical, intellectual development of each child". Richmond school achieves this by maintaining class sizes between 20 and 30 students.

The school contains an annex building titled the portable. This building houses one of the kindergarten classes. This annex is on site in the playground. The demographics of the school are as follows: 54% male, 46% female, with 56% white or caucasian students, 24% Hispanic students and 20% African American students.
