= Thomas Mifflin School =

- U.S. National Register of Historic Places
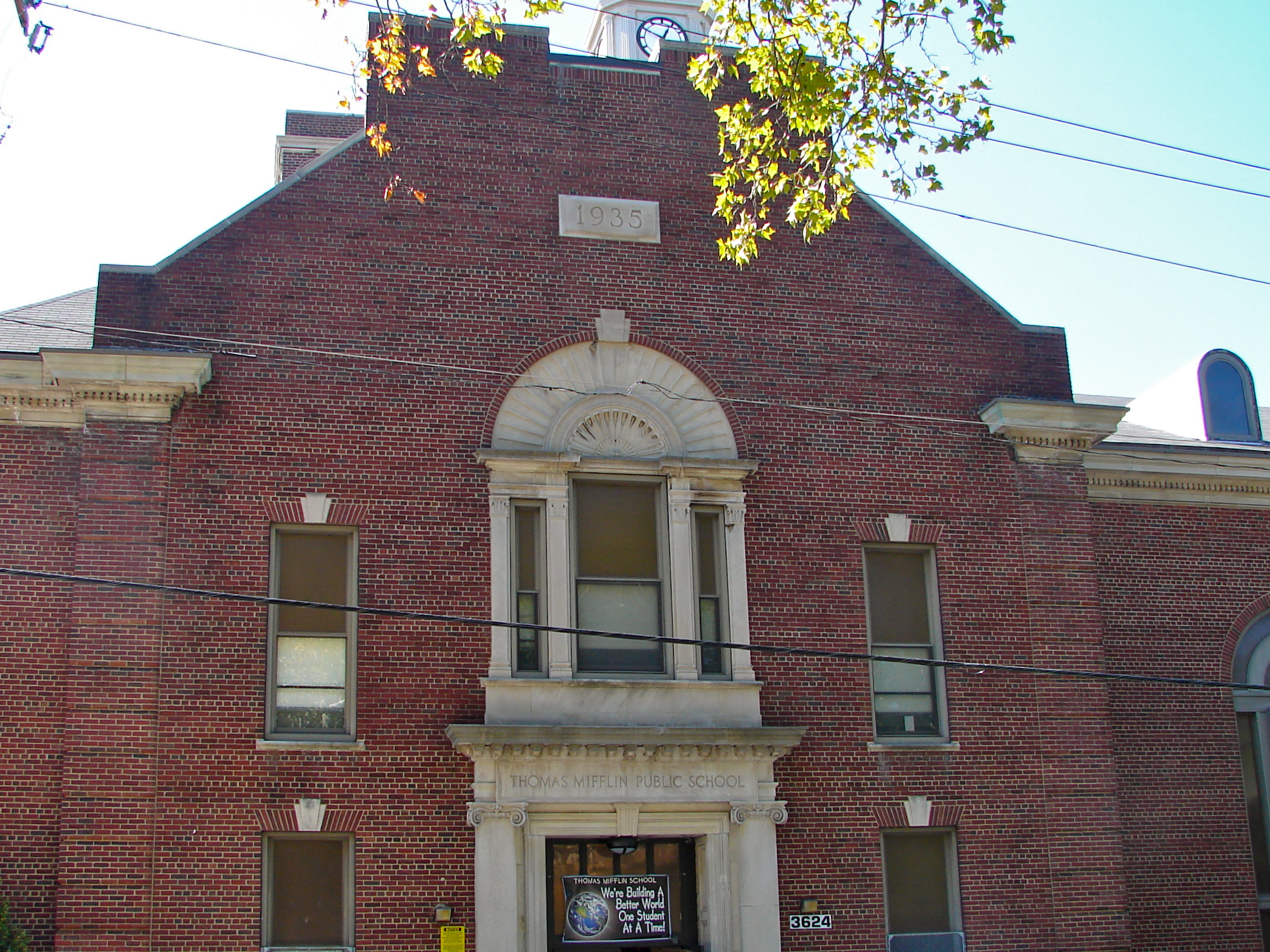
- Thomas Mifflin School in the East Falls neighborhood of Philadelphia, September 2010

- Location within Philadelphia Location within Pennsylvania Location within the United States
- Location: 3624 Conrad Street, Philadelphia, Pennsylvania, U.S.
- Coordinates: 40.0135°N 75.1916°W
- Area: 4 acres (1.6 ha)
- Built: 1936
- Built by: John McShain, Inc.
- Architect: Irwin T. Catharine
- Architectural style: Colonial Revival
- MPS: Philadelphia Public Schools TR
- NRHP reference No.: 88002301
- Added to NRHP: November 18, 1988

The Thomas Mifflin School is a historic American school in the East Falls neighborhood of Philadelphia, Pennsylvania. It is part of the School District of Philadelphia.

The building was added to the National Register of Historic Places in 1988.

== History and architectural features ==
Designed by Irwin T. Catharine and built in 1936, this historic structure is a 2 1/2-story, L-shaped, brick building that sits on a raised basement. Created in the Colonial Revival style, it features a large brick and wood clock tower, gable roof, and rounded gables. Additions were built in 1966 and 1968. The school was named for American merchant and politician Thomas Mifflin (1744–1800).
