= List of schools of the School District of Philadelphia =

As of 2025, there are 218 schools in the School District of Philadelphia, excluding charter schools. Among the schools are 45 elementary, 104 elementary-middle, 2 elementary-middle-high, 14 middle, 6 middle-high, and 47 high schools.

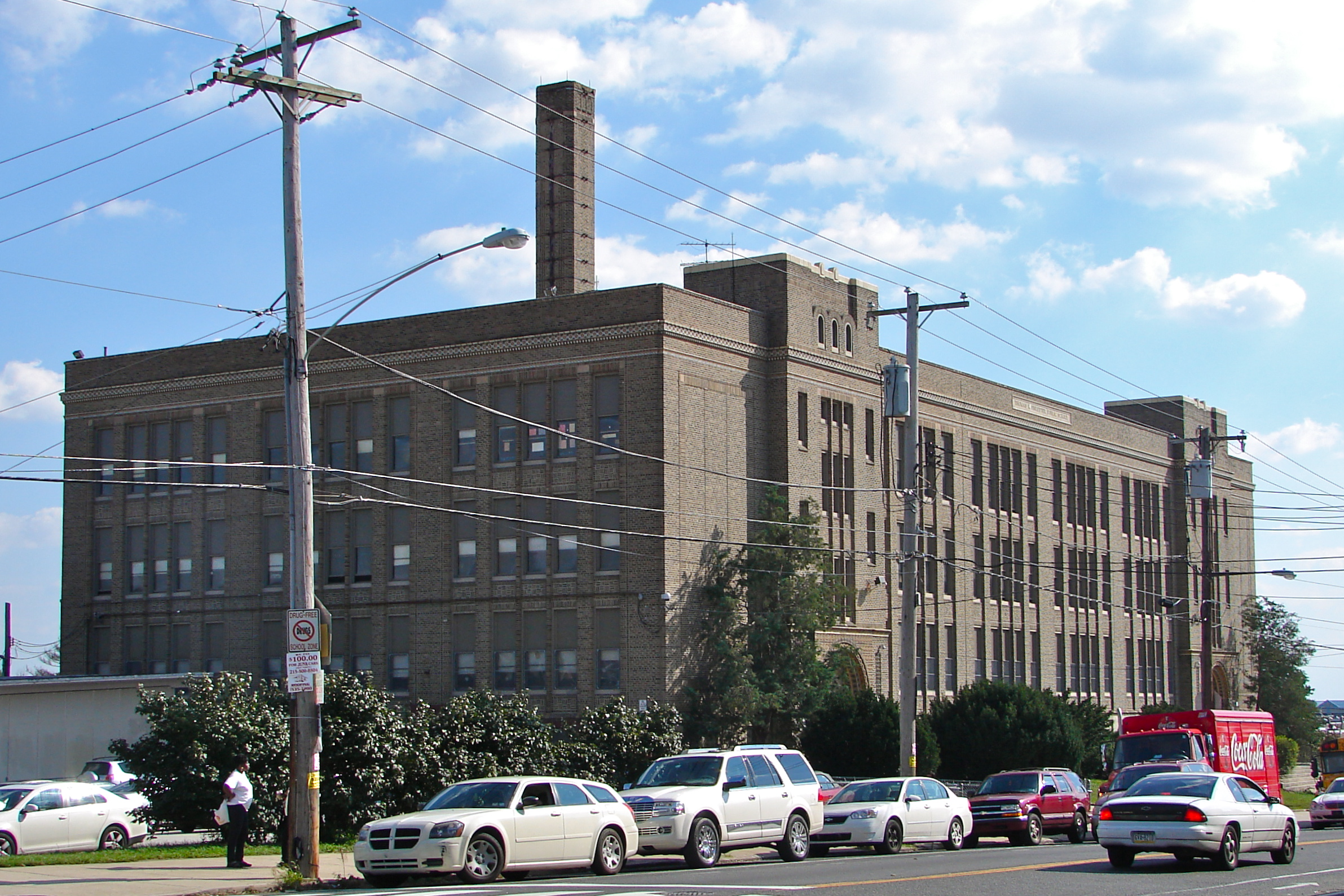
The Thomas K. Finletter School serves kindergarten through 8th grade students in the Olney neighborhood of Philadelphia.

== Elementary/K-8 schools ==
- Adaire, Alexander School
- Allen, Dr. Ethel School
- Allen, Ethan School
- Anderson, Add B. School
- Anderson, Marian Neighborhood Academy
- Bache-Martin School
- Barry, John Elementary School
- Barton, Clara School (K-2)
- Bethune, Mary M. School
- Blaine, James G. School
- Blankenburg, Rudolph School
- Bluford, Guion S. Elementary School
- Bregy, F. Amedee School
- Bridesburg School
- Brown, Henry A. School
- Brown, Joseph H. School
- Bryant, William C. School
- Carnell, Laura H. School (K-5)
- Casarez, Gloria Elementary School (K-5)
- Cassidy, Lewis C. Academics Plus School
- Catharine, Joseph W. School (K-5)
- Cayuga School (K-5)
- Childs, George W. School
- Comegys, Benjamin B. School
- Comly, Watson School (K-5)
- Cook-Wissahickon School
- Cooke, Jay School
- Coppin, Fanny Jackson School
- Cramp, William School (K-5)
- Crossan, Kennedy C. School (K-5)
- Day, Anna B. School
- De Burgos, Julia School
- Decatur, Stephen School
- Dick, William School
- Disston, Hamilton School
- Dobson, James School
- Duckrey, Tanner G. School
- Dunbar, Paul L. School
- Edmonds, Franklin S. School
- Elkin, Lewis School (K-4)
- Ellwood School (K-5)
- Emlen, Eleanor C. School (K-5)
- Farrell, Louis H. School
- Fell, D. Newlin School
- Feltonville Intermediate School (3-5)
- Finletter, Thomas K. School
- Fitler Academics Plus School
- Fitzpatrick, A.L. School
- Forrest, Edwin School (K-5)
- Fox Chase School (K-5)
- Frank, Anne School (K-5)
- Franklin, Benjamin School
- Gideon, Edward School
- Girard, Stephen School
- Global Leadership Academy at Huey
- Gompers, Samuel School
- Greenberg, Joseph School
- Greenfield, Albert M. School
- Hackett, Horatio B. School (K-5)
- Hamilton, Andrew School
- Hancock, John Demonstration School
- Harrington, Avery D. School
- Hartranft, John F. School
- Henry, Charles W. School
- Heston, Edward School
- Holme, Thomas School
- Hopkinson, Francis School
- Houston, Henry H. School
- Hunter, William H. School
- Howe, Julia Ward School (K-5)
- Jenks Academy for Arts and Sciences
- Jenks, Abram S. School (K-5)
- Juniata Park Academy
- Kearny, General Philip School
- Kelley, William D. School
- Kelly, John B. School (K-5)
- Kenderton Elementary School
- Key, Francis S. School (K-6)
- Kirkbride, Eliza B. School
- Lamberton, Robert E. School
- Lawton, Henry W. School (K-5)
- Lea, Henry C. School
- Lingelbach, Anna L. School
- Locke, Alain School
- Loesche, William H. School (K-5)
- Logan, James School (K-5)
- Longstreth, William C. School
- Lowell, James R. School (K-4)
- Ludlow, James R. School
- Marshall, John School (K-5)
- Marshall, Thurgood School
- Mayfair School
- McCall, General George A. School
- McCloskey, John F. School
- McClure, Alexander K. School (K-5)
- McDaniel, Delaplaine School
- McKinley, William School
- McMichael, Morton School
- Meade, General George G. School
- Meredith, William M. School
- Mifflin, Thomas School
- Mitchell, S. Weir School
- Moffet, John School
- Moore, J. Hampton School
- Morris, Robert School
- Morrison, Andrew J. School
- Morton, Thomas G. School
- Munoz-Marin, Honorable Luis School
- Nebinger, George W. School
- Northeast Community Propel Academy
- Olney School
- Overbrook Educational Center
- Overbrook Elementary School
- Patterson, John M. School (K-4)
- Peirce, Thomas M. School (K-5)
- Penn Alexander School
- Pennell, Joseph School (K-5)
- Pennypacker, Samuel W. School
- Penrose School
- Pollock, Robert B. School
- Potter-Thomas School
- Powel, Samuel School (K-4)
- Prince Hall School (K-5)
- Rhawnhurst School (K-5)
- Rhoads, James School
- Rhodes, E. Washington Elementary School
- Richmond School (K-5)
- Roosevelt Elementary School
- Rowen, William School (K-5)
- Sharswood, George W. School
- Shawmont School
- Sheppard, Isaac A. School (K-4)
- Solis-Cohen, Solomon School (K-5)
- Southwark School
- Spring Garden School
- Spruance, Gilbert School
- Stanton, Edwin M. School
- Stearne, Allen M. School
- Steel, Edward T. School
- Sullivan, James J. School (K-5)
- Taggart, John H. School
- Taylor, Bayard School (K-5)
- Vare-Washington School
- Waring, Laura W. School
- Washington, Martha School
- Welsh, John School
- Webster, John H. School
- Willard, Frances E. School (K-4)
- Wright, Richard R. School (K-5)
- Ziegler, William H. School
- Philadelphia Virtual Academy (PVA) (K-12)
- Widener Memorial School (K-12)

Two special admission schools:

- Girard Academic Music Program
- Julia R. Masterman Laboratory and Demonstration School

== Middle schools ==
- AMY at James Martin
- AMY Northwest
- Baldi Middle School
- Castor Gardens Middle School
- Clemente, Roberto Middle School
- Conwell, Russell Magnet Middle School
- Crossroads Accelerated Academy
- Feltonville Arts & Sciences School
- Harding, Warren G. Middle School
- Hill-Freedman World Academy
- Meehan, Austin Middle School
- Middle Years Alt – MYA
- Science Leadership Academy Middle School - SLA-MS
- Tilden, William T. Middle School
- Wagner, Gen. Louis Middle School
- Washington, Grover Jr. Middle School

== High schools ==
=== Neighborhood ===
- John Bartram High School
- Thomas A. Edison High School
- Samuel Fels High School
- Frankford High School
- Benjamin Franklin High School
- Horace Furness High School
- Kensington High School
- Martin Luther King High School
- Abraham Lincoln High School
- Northeast High School
- Overbrook High School
- Penn Treaty School (6-12)
- Roxborough High School
- William L. Sayre High School
- South Philadelphia High School
- Strawberry Mansion High School
- George Washington High School
- West Philadelphia High School

=== Special admission ===
- Academy at Palumbo
- The Arts Academy at Benjamin Rush
- Bodine International Affairs
- CAPA
- Carver High School for Engineering and Science
- Central High School
- GAMP
- Franklin Learning Center
- Hill-Freedman World Academy High School
- Julia R. Masterman School
- Kensington Creative & Performing Arts High School
- Kensington Health Sciences Academy High School
- Parkway Center City High School
- Parkway Northwest High School
- Parkway West High School
- Philadelphia High School for Girls
- Philadelphia Learning Academy
- Philadelphia Military Academy
- Philadelphia Virtual Academy
- Science Leadership Academy
- Science Leadership Academy at Beeber (6-12)
- The LINC
- Walter Biddle Saul High School for Agricultural Sciences

=== Citywide admission ===
- Building 21
- Constitution High School
- Murrell Dobbins Vocational School
- High School of the Future
- Lankenau High School
- Jules E. Mastbaum Technical High School
- Motivation High School
- Paul Robeson High School for Human Services
- Randolph Technical High School
- The U School
- The Workshop School
- Swenson Arts and Technology High School
- Vaux Big Picture High School

== Former schools/Historic School Buildings ==
Elementary Schools

- Adelphi School, closed 1906
- Alexander Wilson School, closed 2013
- Anna B. Pratt Elementary School, closed 2013
- Anthony Wayne School
- Bridesburg School, closed 1894
- Charles R. Drew, closed 2013
- Charles Schaeffer School
- Daniel Boone School (now houses Achieve Academy of Philadelphia)
- David Farragut School
- David Landreth School
- Fairhill Elementary School, closed 2013
- Francis Read School, closed 1980
- Gen. David B. Birney School (currently Lindley Academy Charter School at Birney)
- Gen. John F. Reynolds School, closed 2013
- George L. Brooks School
- George Chandler School
- George L. Horn School
- Washington, George School
- Germantown Grammar School
- Guion S. Bluford School (currently Universal Bluford Charter School)
- Henry Longfellow School
- J. Sylvester Ramsey School
- Joseph C. Ferguson Elementary School, closed 2013
- James Alcorn School (currently Universal Alcorn Charter School)
- Joseph Leidy Elementary School, closed 2013
- John Greenleaf Whittier School (now houses KIPP Philadelphia preparatory academy)
- John L. Kinsey School, closed 2013 (now housing Building 21)
- Laura H. Carnell School
- Leslie P. Hill Elementary School, closed 2013
- Lydia Darrah School
- Mary Channing Wister School
- Mary Disston School
- Mechanicsville School
- M.H. Stanton Elementary School, closed 2013
- Mifflin School
- Muhlenberg School
- Nathaniel Hawthorne School
- Northeast Manual Training School
- Richardson L. Wright School
- Robert Fulton School, closed 2013
- Robert Ralston School
- Rudolph Walton School, closed 2003
- Samuel Daroff School (currently Universal Daroff Charter School)
- Simon Muhr Work Training School
- Spring Garden School No. 1
- Thaddeus Stevens School of Observation
- Thomas Buchanan Read School
- Thomas Creighton School (currently Universal Creighton Charter School)
- Thomas Dunlap School
- Thomas Durham School (now housing Independence Charter School)
- Thomas Meehan School
- Thomas Powers School
- Walter George Smith School, closed 2013
- William B. Hanna School
- William H. Harrison School (now housing St. Malachy School)
- William Levering School (now housing AMY Northwest MS)
- William W. Axe School (now housing Northeast Frankford Boys & Girls Club of Philadelphia)

Middle Schools

- Ada H.H. Lewis Middle School, closed 2008
- Anna H. Shaw Middle School, closed 2013 (currently Hardy Williams Academy)
- Charles Y. Audenried Junior High School (currently Universal Audenried Charter High School)
- Elizabeth Duane Gillespie Junior High School, closed 2011
- George Wharton Pepper Middle School, closed 2013
- Holmes Junior High School
- John P. Turner Middle School
- Mayer Sulzberger Middle School, closed 2010
- Norris S. Barratt Middle School, closed 2012
- Sheridan West Middle School, closed 2013

High schools

- Charles Carroll High School, closed 2013
- Communications Technology High School, closed 2013 (future home of Richard Allen Preparatory charter school)
- Edward W. Bok Technical High School, closed 2013
- Germantown High School, closed 2013
- Robert E. Lamberton High School, closed 2013
- Stephen A. Douglas High School, closed 2013
- Thomas FitzSimons High School, closed 2013
- William Penn High School, closed 2014
- University City High School, closed 2013

== See also ==
- Francis M. Drexel School, former school
- Edison Schools
- Hope Charter School
- Mathematics, Civics and Sciences Charter School
