= Lloyd Titus =

American architect

Lloyd Titus was an American architect who designed at least 10 school buildings that are listed on the U.S. National Register of Historic Places (NRHP).

His NRHP-listed works in Philadelphia include:

- Richardson L. Wright School, 1101 Venango St., Philadelphia, Pennsylvania, designed by Lloyd Titus, the Chief Draftsman, from 1901 to 1905, of the Department of Buildings of the Philadelphia School Board.
- South Philadelphia High School. The original building was constructed 1907 in a Norman Romanesque style designed by Board of Education Architect Lloyd Titus.
- William W. Axe School, 1709–1733 Kinsey St.
- Alexander Dallas Bache School, 801 N. Twenty-second St.
- George L. Brooks School, 5629–5643 Haverford Ave.
- Thomas Dunlap School, 5031 Race St.
- George L. Horn School, Frankford and Castor Aves.
- Thomas Meehan School, 5347–5353 Pulaski St.
- Northeast Manual Training School, 701 Lehigh St.
- Overbrook Elementary School, 2032 N. 62nd St.
- William J. Stokely School, 1844–1860 N. Thirty-second St.
