= Bridesburg, Philadelphia =

Bridesburg
- Former Borough
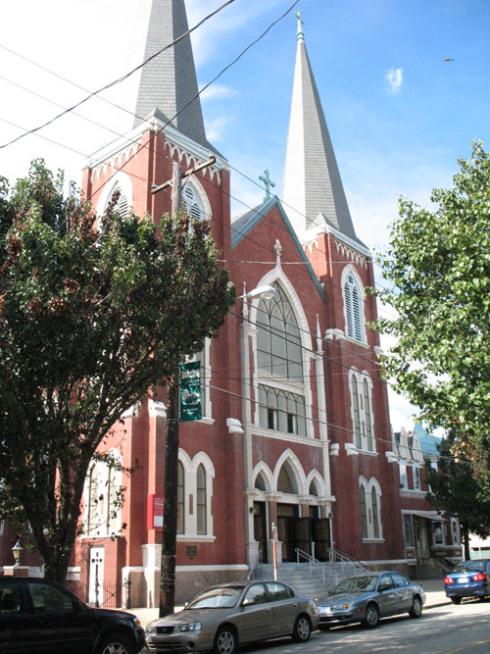
- St. John Cantius Church in Bridesburg

- Location of Bridesburg in Pennsylvania Bridesburg (the United States)
- Coordinates: 40°00′11″N 75°04′08″W
- Country: United States
- State: Pennsylvania
- County: Philadelphia
- Time zone: UTC-5 (EST)
  - Summer (DST): UTC-4 (EDT)
- Area codes: 215, 267 and 445

Bridesburg is the northernmost neighborhood in the River Wards section of Philadelphia, Pennsylvania, United States. A mostly working-class neighborhood, Bridgesburg is an historically Irish and German community, with a significant community of Polish immigrants who arrived mostly in the early- to mid-twentieth century. The community is home to two Catholic churches: All Saints Church, designed by Edwin Forrest Durang and built in 1889; and Saint John Cantius Church, built in 1898 in Polish cathedral style.

== Boundaries ==
The historic boundaries of the former borough of Bridesburg were the original course of Frankford Creek around the south and west, the Delaware River to the southeast, and Port Richmond to the southwest, along a border at Pike Street near Wheatsheaf Lane. Aramingo Avenue/I-95 is the border to the western edge of the neighborhood that borders Frankford. Adjacent neighborhoods are Wissinoming to the northeast, Whitehall to the north, Frankford to the northwest, and Port Richmond to the southwest.

The 19137 ZIP Code, of which Bridesburg forms the major part, extends as far to the southwest as Castor Avenue, and includes some area to the northwest of I-95 and the original course of Frankford Creek. A small portion of Bridesburg (also 19137) is situated directly next to the 19124 ZIP code known as Frankford. Physical boundaries of Bridesburg are: Bridge Street on the north, Aramingo Avenue and I-95 to the northwest, Frankford Creek to the south, and the Delaware River to the east.

== History ==
Before the arrival of Europeans, the Lenni Lenape Indians inhabited the region. Explorer Henry Hudson in 1609 was the first European to set foot in this region, and based on his findings these Indians were considered to be the first inhabitants of the area.

=== New Sweden ===
In 1638, the Swedes bought land east of the Delaware River from the Indians and named it New Sweden. The Swedes lived with the Indians on friendly terms. By 1645 the Swedes had expanded to the Northeast of modern-day Philadelphia, and in 1647 the Dutch arrived. But it was not until the 1680s when the English came with William Penn that the area was actually developed. After 1750, Germans then settled the area, particularly in Bridesburg and Frankford.

Founded in the early 19th century, Bridesburg, a tract of land formerly belonging to Point-no-Point, took its name from Joseph Kirkbride, who for many years owned land there and was proprietor of a ferry over Frankford Creek, and to whom the Legislature gave the right to build a bridge and receive toll for passage over the same by act of March 20, 1811. On April 1, 1833, Philadelphia County bought the Kirkbride bridge and two-and-a-half acres of land annexed for $5,500. Kirkbridesburg was considered too long a name for convenience, and the shorter "Bridesburg" was adopted. Bridesburg was incorporated as a borough on April 1, 1848. In 1854, the borough was annexed to the city of Philadelphia in the Act of Consolidation.

=== Point-No-Point ===
The region was known in Colonial times as Point-no-Point, due to the deceptive appearance of the blunt cape at the mouth of Frankford Creek. When first seen going northward it appeared to be a point, sharply jutting into the stream, but upon approaching, it lost its character and seemed to be an ordinary portion of the right bank; on further approach it seemed to again jut out into a point.

Principal T. Worcester Worrell used to teach his pupils the ditty:

Point look out, point look in,
Point no Point, and point ag'in.

Many famous personalities in history have passed through the lands of Point-no-Point. The second President of the United States wrote a letter to his wife Abigail describing his travels in Point-no-Point.

On 25 May 1777 John Adams wrote:

The road to Point-no-point lies along the river Delaware, in fair sight of it and its opposite shore. For near four miles the road is as strait as the streets of Philadelphia. On each side, are beautiful rows of trees, buttonwoods, oaks, walnuts, cherries and willows, especially down towards the banks of the river. The meadows, pastures and grass plats are as green as leeks. There are many fruit trees and fine orchards set with the nicest regularity. But the fields of grain, the rye and wheat exceed all description. These fields are all sown in ridges and the furrow between each couple of ridges is as plainly to be seen as if a swath had been mown along. Yet it is no wider than a ploughshare and it is as strait as an arrow. It looks as if the sower had gone along the furrow with his spectacles to pick up every grain that should accidentally fall into it. The corn is just coming out of the ground. The furrows struck out for the hills to be planted in, are each way as straight, as mathematical right lines; and the squares between every four hills as exact as they could be done by plumb and line, or scale and compass.

=== Bridesburg Borough ===
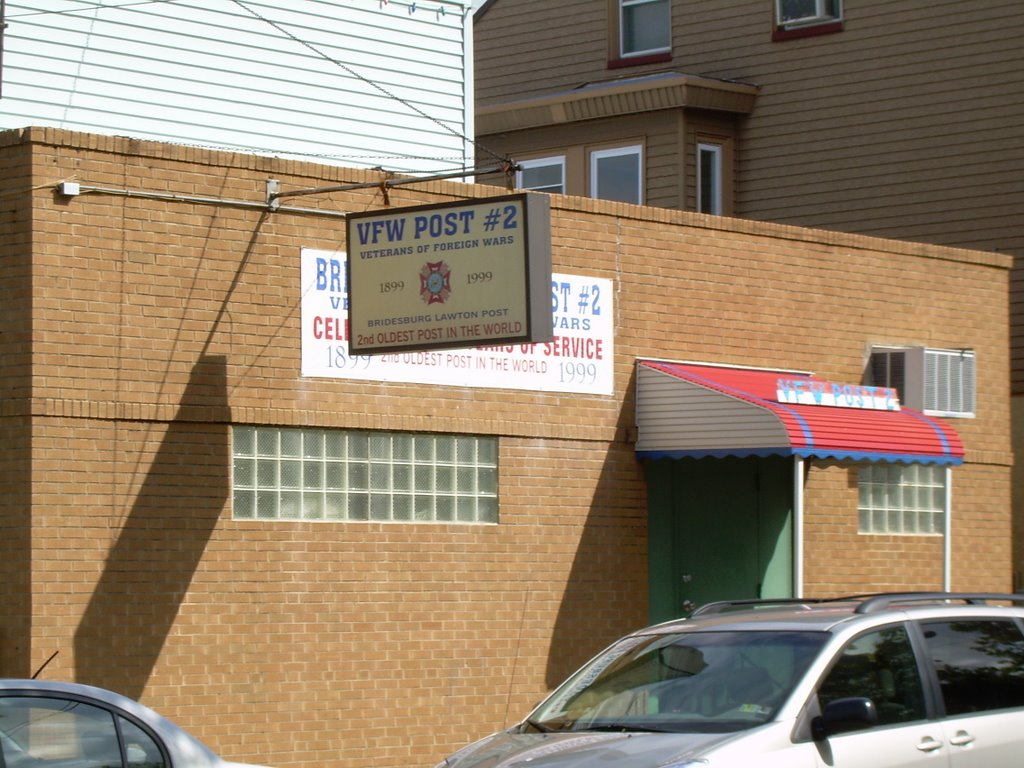
VFW Post 2

Bridesburg was incorporated as a borough on April 1, 1848; it included the peninsula between the lower Frankford Creek and the Delaware River, and beyond Richmond district, the boundary lying near the projected line of Pike street, not far from Wheat Sheaf Lane.

It was first called Kirkbridesburg, for Joseph Kirkbride, who operated a ferry to New Jersey, and in 1811 built a toll bridge at Bridge street over Frankford Creek. The villagers decided the name was too long, and shortened it to Bridesburg. The Bridesburg Manufacturing Company was established in 1820 by Kirkbride. It was originally a textile mill on Frankford Creek. Industry followed the company into Bridesburg, especially with the establishment of the Bridesburg Manufacturing Company and the U.S. Arsenal in 1816.

In 1854, the borough was annexed to the city of Philadelphia in the Act of Consolidation.

At the end of the 19th century, Costello, Cooey & Co., a company specializing in kidskin leather (from young goats) and the chromium tanning process, employed more than 100 workers. It operated on the east side of Orthodox Street on the Frankford Creek between 1897 and 1914, "with three modern brick factory buildings and brick warehouse: up-to-date equipment for the manufacture of glazed leather and leather for a patent kid, side and horse, with the capacity of from 300 to 400 dozen daily."

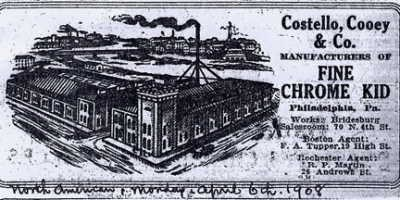
Costello, Cooey & Co. Fine Chrome Kid. Bridesburg, Philadelphia. North American. 6 April 1908.

Robert Cooey (1840-1903), an emigrant from Newtownstewart, County Tyrone, arrived in Philadelphia on the packet ship The Provincialist in 1851 with his sister Isabella at the age of 10. He went to work with his brother and father in the tanneries of the Northern Liberties. In 1877, he partnered with Mark Costello (1844-1928), an emigrant from Ballinderry, to form a Philadelphia tannery, with Charles O'Neill, John McStay, and Christopher Conway. They rented a narrow store front at 2nd & Willow Street, with its rail lines down the center, bringing livestock and their valuable skin, especially goats, sheep and calves but also cattle and horses. The firm specialized in moroccan leather and worked leather into products ranging from gloves to handbags to shoes.

In 1897, Costello, Cooey & Co. moved to Bridesburg, into "the main building of two stories, containing offices, glazing room, toilets, dyeing and buffing room, one-story tannery building, containing vats and accessories thereto, the two buildings being connected by enclosed passage-way; a boiler and engine house, boilers and accessories for 250 horse-power, and steam engine of 150 horse-power, and piece of land…” By 1908, they opened an Arch Street showroom for shoes and other goods.

In 1895, John Rose & Sons, undertakers, John Rose (1855-1916), an emigrant cabinetmaker from London, proprietor, opened at 2616 Bridge Street, in a former tavern and schoolhouse that still stands today, with son Alfred P. G. Rose and descendants succeeding. The family served the community as the Rose Funeral Home until 2023. William Tippetts Rose, a son, ran parlors in Frankford, and purchased the Beach Haven Terrace Yacht Club on Long Beach Island in 1933.

Another son Charles Samuel Rose married Martha Cooey, the daughter of Robert Cooey and Sophia Borbeck, at the Bridesburg Presbyterian Church, on January 27, 1909. Their sons Robert Cooey Rose and John Samuel Rose operated funeral businesses Frankford and Lawncrest into the 1970s. Martha, her children, grandchildren and descendants continue the family tradition of life on Long Beach Island.

Bridesburg Foundry has been in continuous operation since 1914. The company began in Bridesburg and then moved to its present location in Whitehall, Pennsylvania in 1941.

Polish families migrated to Bridesburg between 1900 and 1920. "The Frankford leather plant of Robert H. Foerderer Inc. originally hired Polish men to work in curing the hides. This process consisted of soaking hides for days in dog manure to soften it. The smell of the manure and the need to handle the soaked leather made this job unacceptable to most Philadelphia workers. However, the new Polish immigrant, excluded from most factory work in the city, flocked to Bridesburg for work."

Bridesburg is home to the second oldest VFW Post in the world, founded in 1899.

Bridesburg is also home to the Joseph A. Ferko String Band. The Ferko String Band is a member of the Philadelphia String Band Association, which is a division of the Philadelphia Mummers Parade.

== Population ==
As of the 2010 Census, Bridesburg had a population of 8,638, of which 90% was white, 5.5% Hispanic, 1.9% was black or African-American, 0.6% was Asian, and the remaining 2% was other or mixed races.

== Notable occupants and landmarks ==
- Betsy Ross Bridge
- Bridesburg Recreation Center
- Most Holy Redeemer Cemetery
- Dow Chemical Company
- AdvanSix Phenol Plant
- Historic Bridesburg School (listed on the National Register of Historic Places; it was demolished in the late 2000s.)
- Aqua String Band
- Ferko String Band

=== Churches ===
For its size, Bridesburg is the home of a large number of churches:

- All Saints Roman Catholic Church, Thompson and Buckius Streets, designed by noted ecclesiastical architect Edwin Forrest Durang. (Parish closed. Building stands)
- Bridesburg Emanuel United Church of Christ, Fillmore and Thompson Streets
- Bridesburg Methodist Episcopal Church, 2717 Kirkbride St.
- First Presbyterian Church of Bridesburg, 2770 Pratt St. (closed)
- First Baptist Church of Bridesburg, 2715 Lefevre St. (closed)
- Grace Baptist Church of Bridesburg, 4544 Almond St.
- ReaLife Church, Buckius and Richmond Streets (closed)
- St. John Cantius Roman Catholic Church, 4415 Almond St.

== Cemeteries ==
- Holy Redeemer Cemetery
- Emanuel United Church of Christ Cemetery, Fillmore and Almond Streets
- All Saints Church Cemetery

== Education ==
The School District of Philadelphia operates Bridesburg Elementary School, which serves elementary school students. Residents are also zoned to Warren G. Harding Middle School and Frankford High School.

At one time, the Roman Catholic Archdiocese of Philadelphia operated two Catholic schools in Bridesburg: All Saints School (1864-2004) and St. John Cantius School. Pope John Paul II Regional Catholic School (formerly St. John Cantius Elementary School) was in operation from 2004 until 2012. Students choosing Catholic education in a Catholic school attend Blessed Trinity Regional School (formerly St. Timothy's School) in Mayfair since September 2012.

Charter schools include:

- Franklin Towne Charter Elementary School (grades K-8)
- Franklin Towne Charter High School (grades 9–12)
- Maritime Academy Charter School (grades 2–12, with grades 9-12 located in Fishtown)

== Government and infrastructure ==
The United States Post Office operates the Bridesburg Post Office at 2734 Orthodox Street.

== Public transportation ==
SEPTA bus routes 25, 73, 41, and 84 all run in/near the neighborhood. Bridesburg station of the Trenton Line of SEPTA Regional Rail is located in the neighborhood.
