= Mechanicsville School =

Mechanicsville School may refer to:

- Mechanicsville School (Norcross, Georgia), listed on the National Register of Historic Places in Gwinnett County, Georgia
- Mechanicsville School (Philadelphia, Pennsylvania), listed on the National Register of Historic Places in Philadelphia County, Pennsylvania
