= Haddington, Philadelphia =

- Haddington Historic District
- U.S. National Register of Historic Places
- U.S. Historic district
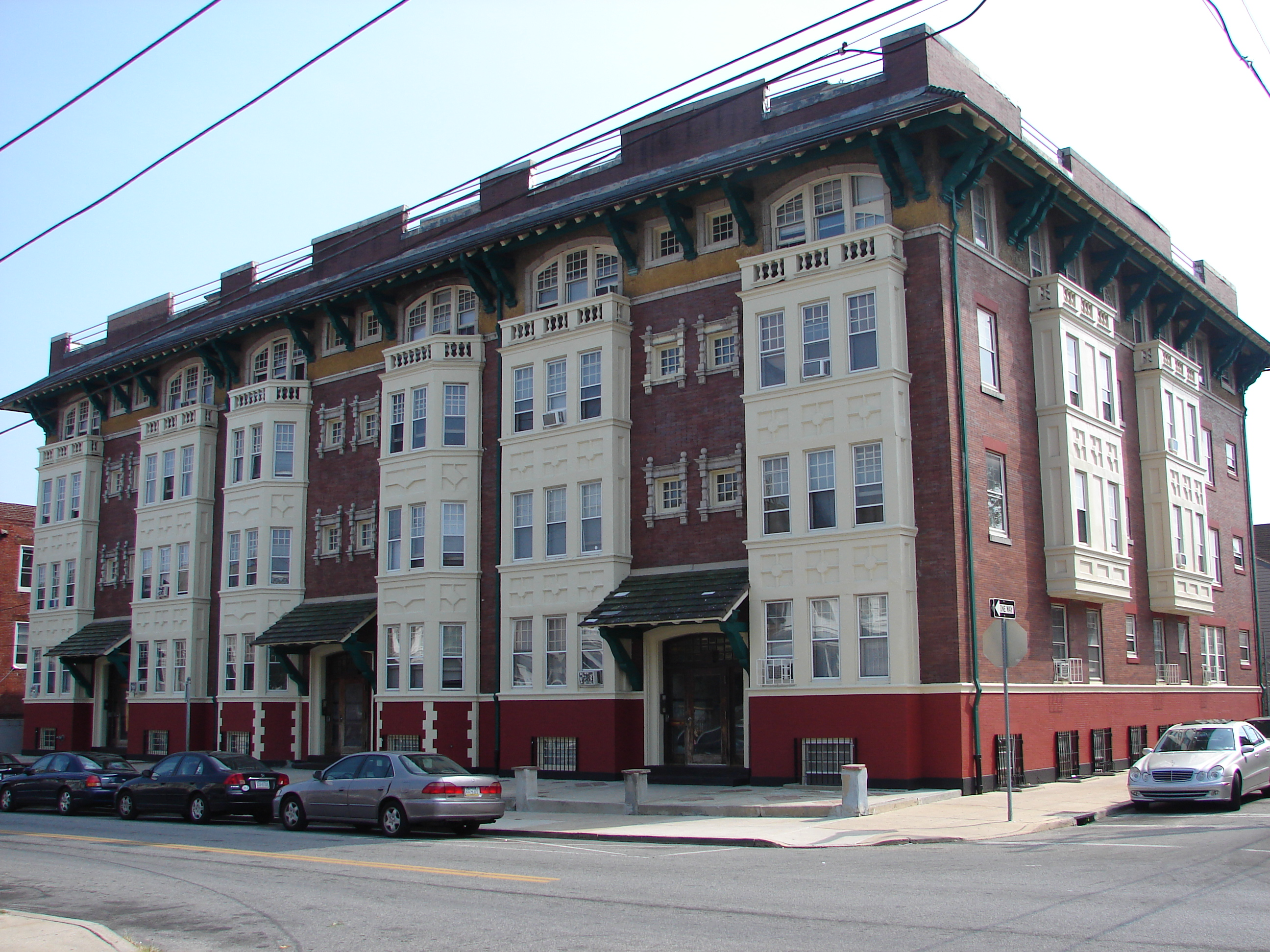

- Location within Philadelphia Location within Pennsylvania Location within the United States
- Location: 6000 blocks of Market, Ludlow and Chestnut Sts., Philadelphia, Pennsylvania
- Coordinates: 39°57′41″N 75°14′31″W
- Area: 8 acres (3.2 ha)
- Architect: E. Allen Wilson et al.
- Architectural style: Colonial Revival, Classical Revival, Mission/Spanish Revival
- NRHP reference No.: 88001832
- Added to NRHP: September 29, 1988

Haddington is a neighborhood in the West Philadelphia section of Philadelphia, Pennsylvania, United States. Its borders are defined as Haverford Avenue/Girard Avenue to the north, 52nd Street to the east, Market Street to the south, and 67th Street to the westernmost edge of the neighborhood.

== History and architectural features ==
It is a largely African American community of mostly two-story rowhouses with a large proportion of elderly residents and a high home-ownership rate. Near the intersection of Vine Street and 56th Street, new construction and community facilities were built in the 1970s thanks to the Haddington Leadership Organization.

Haddington's Historic District is located on the 6000 blocks of Market, Ludlow, and Chestnut Streets, showcasing colonial and classical revival styles of architecture built from 1909 to 1915. It was listed on the National Register of Historic Places in 1998.

Also listed on the National Register of Historic Places are the George L. Brooks School and Thomas Dunlap School.

== Education ==
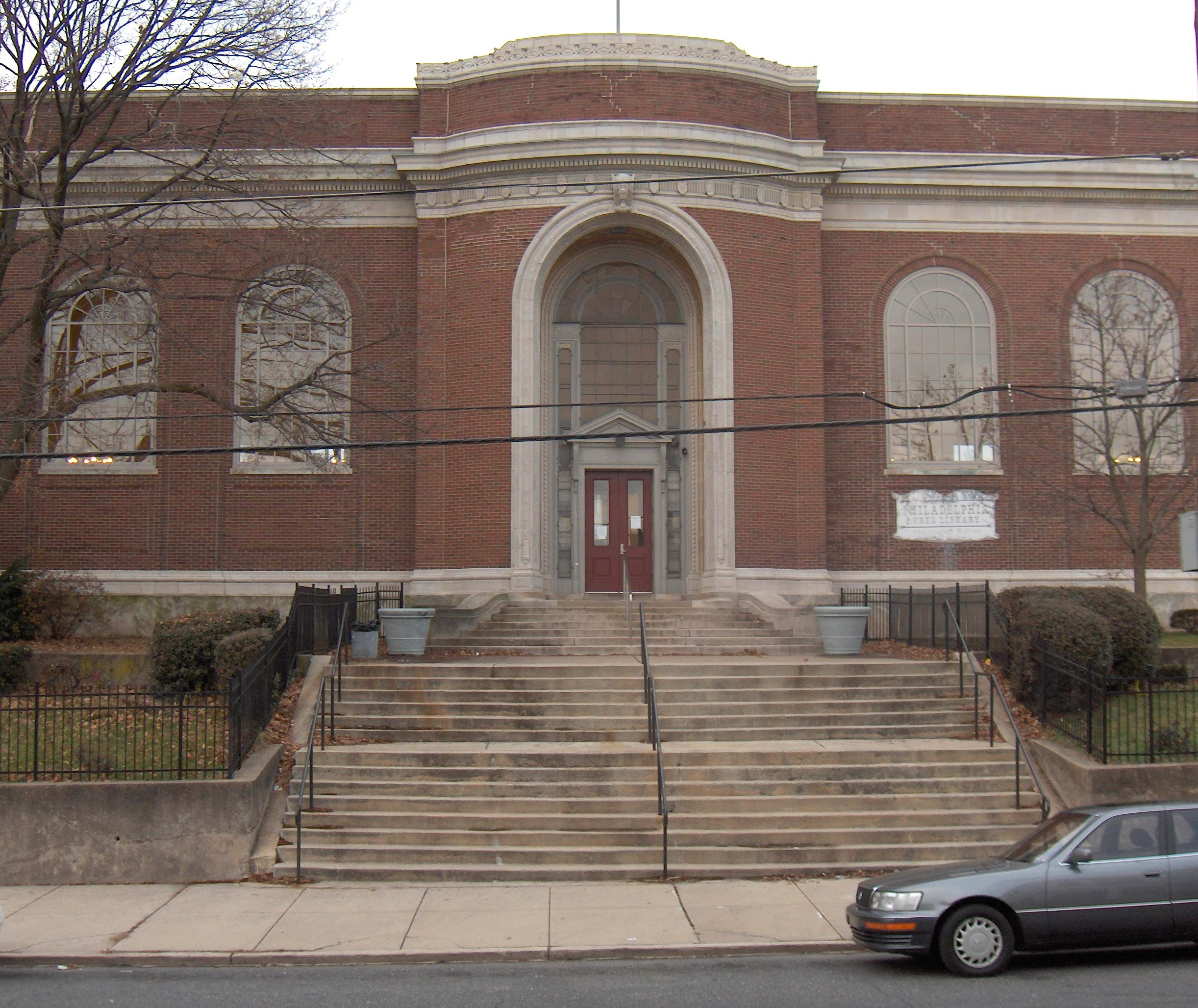
Haddington Branch

The School District of Philadelphia operates public schools.

The Free Library of Philadelphia Haddington Branch serves Haddington.
