= Lower North Philadelphia Speculative Housing Historic District =

Historic district in Pennsylvania, United States

- U.S. National Register of Historic Places
- U.S. Historic district
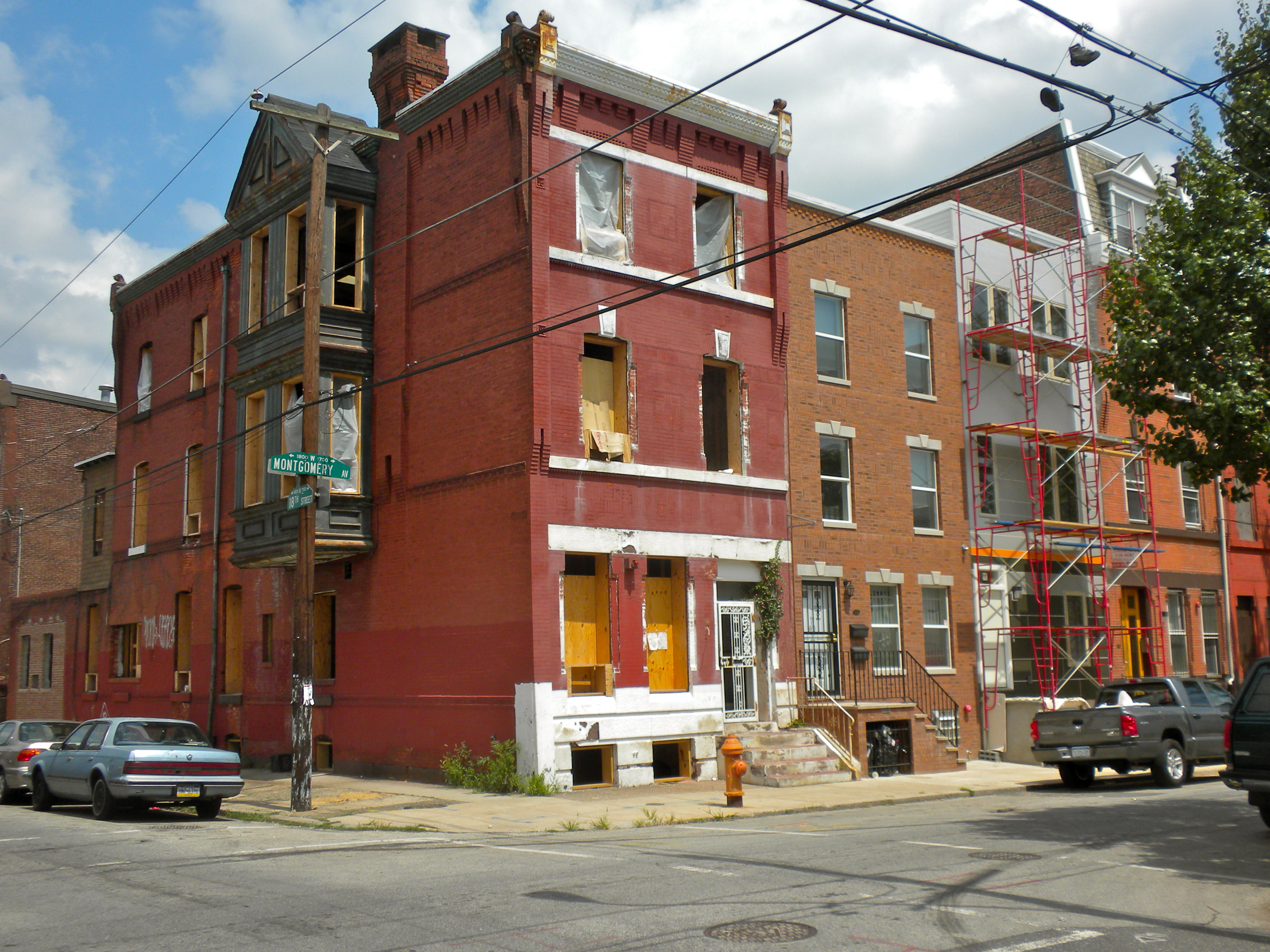
- Montgomery and 18th, Lower North Philadelphia Speculative Housing Historic District, August 2010

- Location within Philadelphia Location within Pennsylvania Location within the United States
- Location: Roughly bounded by N. 15th St., Sydenham St., N. 16th St., Montgomery Av., N. 19th St. Jefferson St., Willington St., Philadelphia, Pennsylvania
- Coordinates: 39°58′00″N 75°09′44″W
- Area: 60 acres (24 ha)
- Architect: Hale, Willis; Lonsdate, Thomas, et al.
- Architectural style: Italianate, Gothic
- NRHP reference No.: 99000325
- Added to NRHP: March 12, 1999

The Lower North Philadelphia Speculative Housing Historic District, also known as the Cecil B. Moore Redevelopment Area, is a national historic district located in the North Central neighborhood of Philadelphia, Pennsylvania.

It was added to the National Register of Historic Places in 1999.

== History and architectural features ==
This district encompasses 855 contributing buildings, and is a predominantly residential district, which was primarily built between 1868 and 1875 and is representative of the Italianate and Gothic architectural styles. It mostly consists of rowhouse blocks, with dwellings mostly three stories in height and between 14 and 21 feet wide.

Notable non-residential buildings include the former Gethsemane Baptist Church, Messiah Lutheran Church, and Universalist Church of the Restoration. Located in the district and separately listed are the George Meade School, Muhlenberg School, and Wagner Free Institute of Science.

It was added to the National Register of Historic Places in 1999.
