= Bridesburg School =

- U.S. National Register of Historic Places
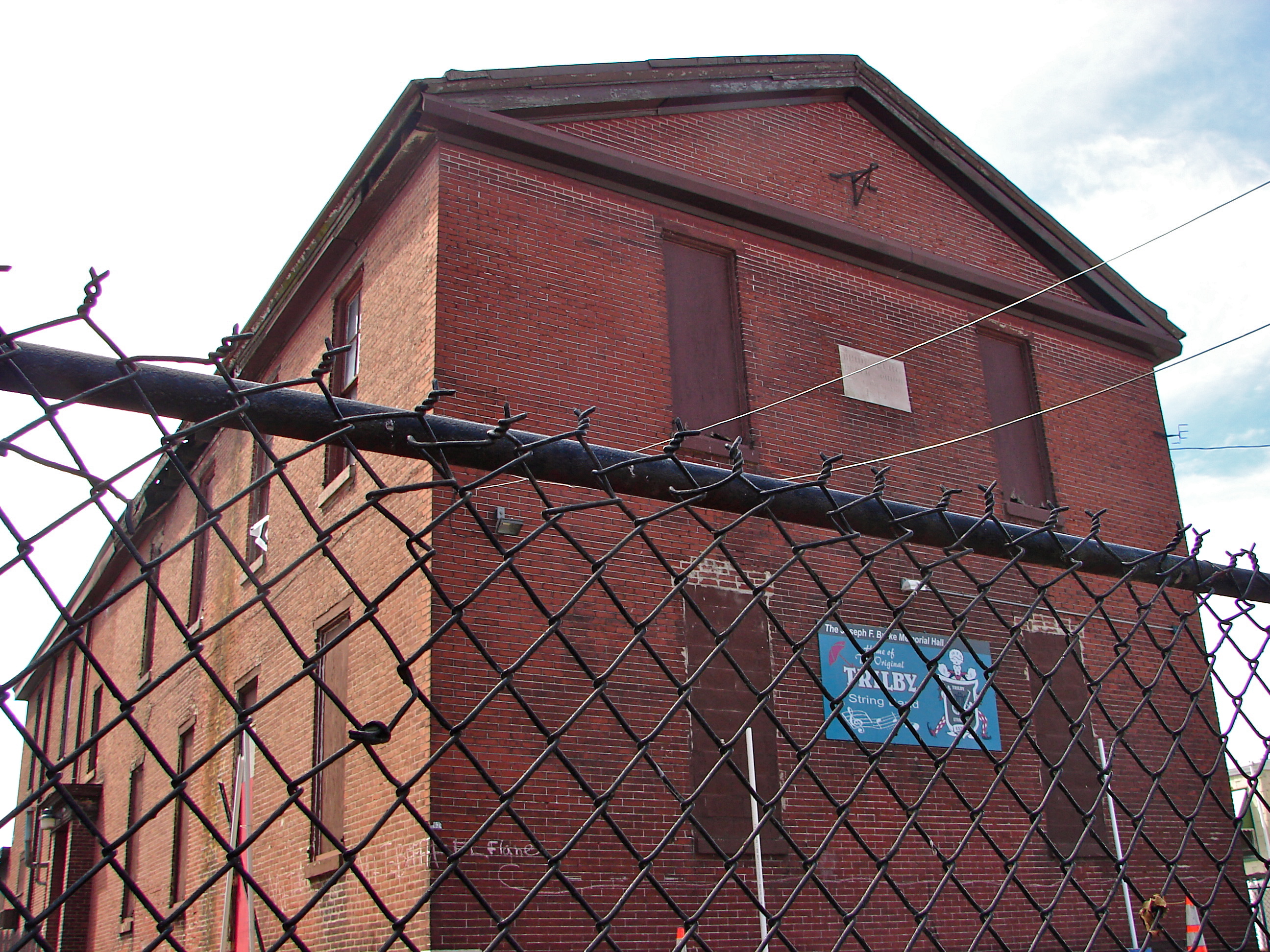

- Location within Philadelphia Location within Pennsylvania Location within the United States
- Location: 2624 Haworth St. Philadelphia, Pennsylvania
- Coordinates: 40°0′9″N 75°4′5″W
- Built: 1847
- Architect: Henry Funk
- Architectural style: Greek Revival
- MPS: Philadelphia Public Schools TR
- NRHP reference No.: 88002285
- Added to NRHP: April 10, 1989

Bridesburg School, also known as Irving School, was a historic school in the Bridesburg neighborhood of Philadelphia, Pennsylvania. It was the third-oldest surviving school building in Philadelphia, after the Mifflin School, and the much altered Penn Township School. The two-story building was built by Henry Funk in 1847–48 with five classrooms. In 1866, three classrooms were added by builder Charles Fay. In 1888 it was replaced by the new Bridesburg School, and then sold in 1894. It was since used as a warehouse.

The building was listed on the National Register of Historic Places in 1989.

Google Earth satellite imagery shows that the building was demolished sometime between May 12, 2015 and May 24, 2016.
