= Anna B. Pratt Elementary School =

Coordinates: 39.988028°N 75.169152°W

Location
- 2200 North 22nd Street; Philadelphia, Pennsylvania 19132; United States

Information
- Type: Public elementary school
- Closed: 2013
- School district: The School District of Philadelphia
- Principal: Leta Johnson-Garner
- Grades: PK-6
- Enrollment: 370

The Anna B. Pratt Elementary School (commonly referred to as the Anna B. Pratt Academy) was a district-run elementary school in Philadelphia.

The school was closed in 2013 as part of Philadelphia's shutdown of 23 district-run schools. Displaced students were enrolled in the Richard R. Wright School and the William Dick School.

== See also ==
- List of schools of the School District of Philadelphia
