= St. John Cantius Roman Catholic Church (Philadelphia) =

Coordinates: 40.00022°N 75.07492°W

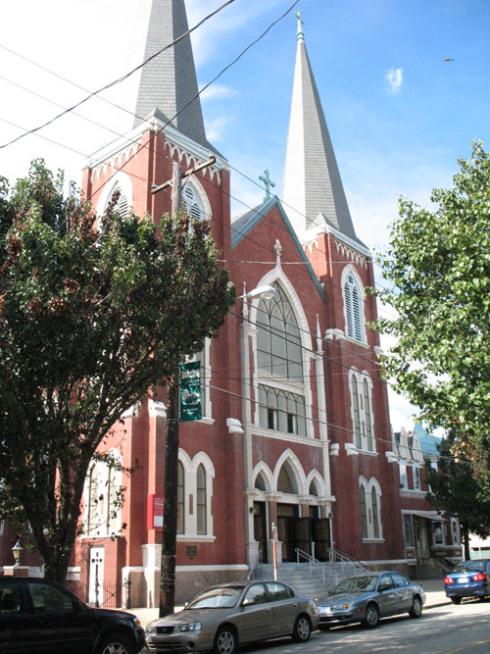
- Location: 4415 Almond Street, Bridesburg, Philadelphia, Pennsylvania
- Denomination: Roman Catholic

History
- Status: Former parish church (merged with All Saints Parish in 2013)
- Founded: 1892

Administration
- Diocese: Roman Catholic Archdiocese of Philadelphia

St. John Cantius Roman Catholic Church, Philadelphia, is located in Northeast Philadelphia in Bridesburg and serves the local Polish-speaking population in the area. It is located at 4415 Almond Street.

The chapel is next to the church on Thompson Street. Sunday Masses are celebrated in the chapel from June to September. Daily Masses are also celebrated in the chapel.

All Saints Parish and St. John Cantius Parish merged to become a new parish at the site of St. John Cantius, with All Saints Church remaining “a worship site for the time being,” according to a statement by the archdiocese.

== History ==
The parish was founded in 1892 and the church was built in 1898.

== Parish schooling ==
Schooling for children is at Blessed Trinity Regional Catholic School, 3033 Levick Street, Philadelphia, PA 19149.
