= Elmwood Park, Philadelphia =

Elmwood Park
- Neighborhood of Philadelphia
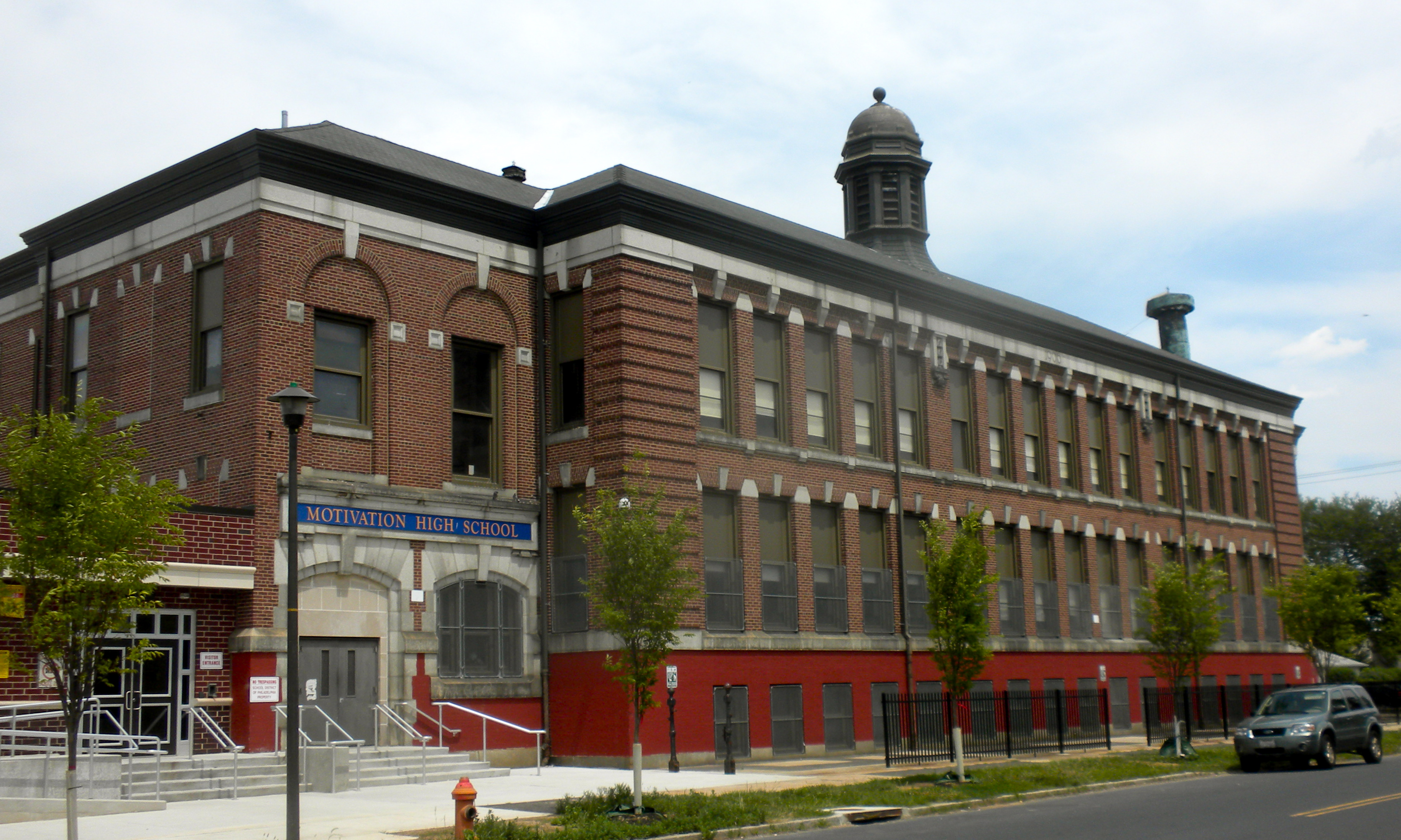
- Motivation High School in Elmwood Park, June 2010

- Location within Philadelphia
- Country: United States
- State: Pennsylvania
- County: Philadelphia
- City: Philadelphia
- Area codes: 215, 267, and 445

Elmwood Park, also known simply as Elmwood, is a neighborhood in the Southwest section of Philadelphia, Pennsylvania, United States. It borders the city line with Delaware County at Cobbs Creek, and extends to the Schuylkill River. The Eastwick neighborhood borders it to the southwest, and Kingsessing borders it on the northeast.

Poles and Irish Americans had long been the majority in the neighborhood, organized around Catholic parishes established throughout the early to mid 20th century.

In 1985, Mayor Wilson Goode declared a state of emergency as white rioters demonstrated outside two houses in Elmwood, creating an "imminent danger of civil disturbance." One home had been sold to an African-American family and the other to an interracial couple. Between 1990 and 2000, the white population decreased by 57.39% while the African American population increased by 55.40%. Vietnamese American refugees and West African immigrants have joined African Americans in making today's Elmwood a more racially diverse neighborhood as the white population decreases.

The Route 36 trolley runs along Elmwood Avenue through the heart of the neighborhood. A storage facility that is also used as an alternate terminus is also located there.

The Thomas Buchanan Read School and William J. Tilden Junior High School were added to the National Register of Historic Places in 1986.

Elmwood Park's The Labor Monument: Philadelphia's Tribute to the American Worker (2010) by artist John Kindness is one of the first monuments in the United States commemorating the contributions of organized labor nationwide. The monument was commissioned by the Association for Public Art (formerly the Fairmount Park Art Association) and installed in 2010 at 71st Street and Buist Avenue.

== Demographics ==
As of the census of 2000, there were 27,329 people living in the neighborhood. The racial makeup was 31.15% White, 55.40% African American, 10.33% Asian, and 0.75% from other races. Hispanic or Latino of any race were 2.25% of the population. The median income for a household in the neighborhood was $24,817.

== Education ==
Free Library of Philadelphia operates the Paschalville Branch, which serves Elmwood and other subdivisions, at 6942 Woodland Avenue. The system also operates the Eastwick Branch, which serves Elmwood Park and other subdivisions, at 2581 Island Avenue.
