= William W. Axe School =

- U.S. National Register of Historic Places
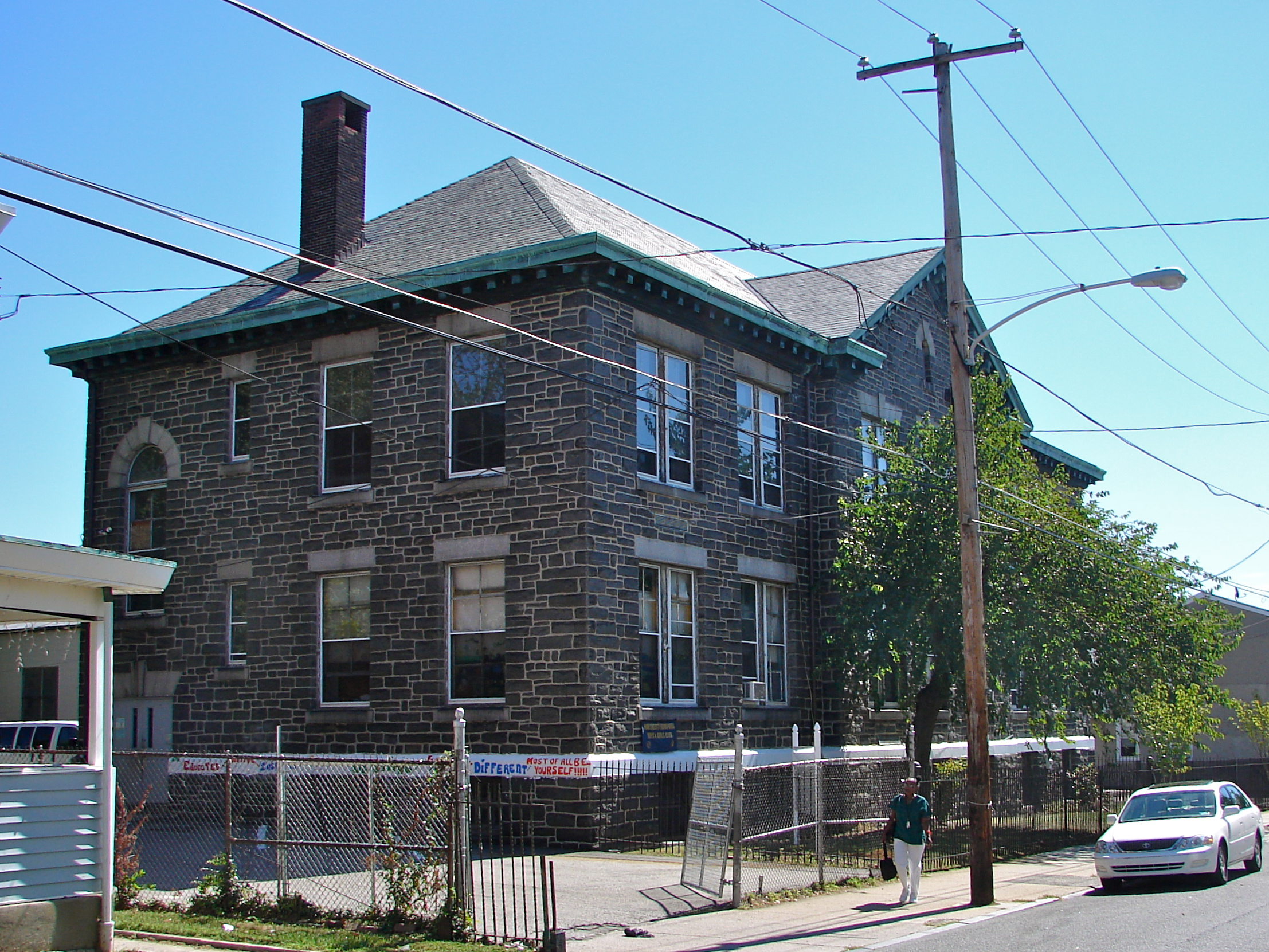

- Location within Philadelphia Location within Pennsylvania Location within the United States
- Location: 1709 Kinsey St., Philadelphia, Pennsylvania, United States
- Coordinates: 40°0′42″N 75°5′2″W
- Area: 2 acres (0.81 ha)
- Built: 1903–1904
- Built by: Samuel, Jr. Gourley
- Architect: Lloyd Titus
- Architectural style: Colonial Revival
- MPS: Philadelphia Public Schools TR
- NRHP reference No.: 88002240
- Added to NRHP: November 18, 1988

The William W. Axe School is a historic school building located in the Frankford neighborhood of Philadelphia, Pennsylvania, United States.

Added to the National Register of Historic Places in 1988, it is currently home to the Northeast Frankford site of the Boys & Girls Clubs of Philadelphia.

== History and architectural features ==
Designed by Lloyd Titus and built between 1903 and 1904, this historic structure is a two-story, three-bay, stone building that sits on a raised basement. Created in the Colonial Revival style, it has a one-story, rear, brick addition. It features stone lintels and sashes and a projecting center section with gable.

It was added to the National Register of Historic Places in 1988. It is currently home to the Northeast Frankford site of the Boys & Girls Clubs of Philadelphia.
