= George Meade School =

- U.S. National Register of Historic Places
- U.S. Historic district – Contributing property
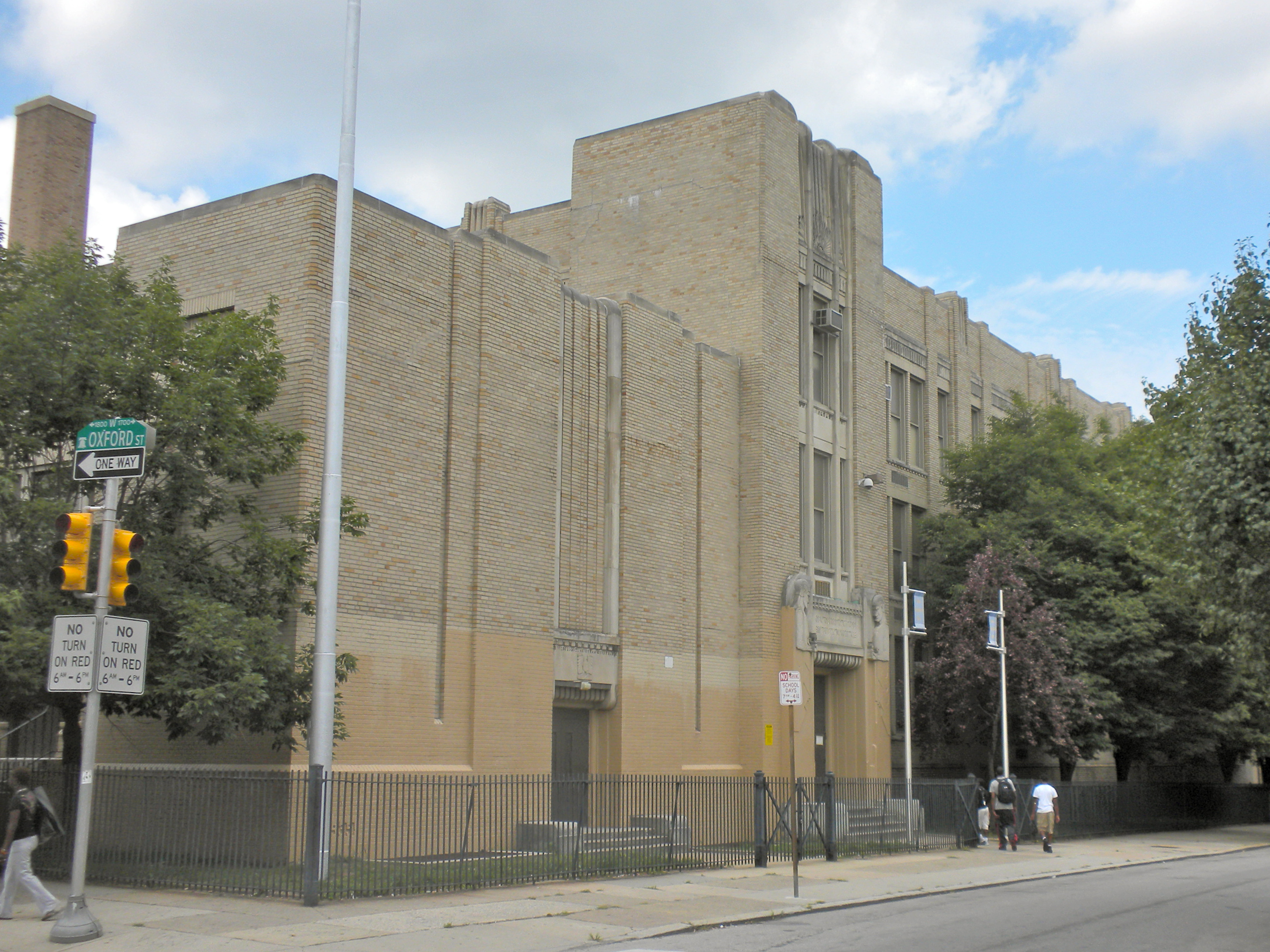
- George Meade School, August 2010

- Location within Philadelphia Location within Pennsylvania Location within the United States
- Location: 1600 N. 18th St., Philadelphia, Pennsylvania, United States
- Coordinates: 39°58′43″N 75°09′53″W
- Area: 1 acre (0.40 ha)
- Built: 1936
- Built by: Smith & Bradley
- Architect: Irwin T. Catharine
- Architectural style: Moderne
- MPS: Philadelphia Public Schools TR
- NRHP reference No.: 86003305
- Added to NRHP: December 4, 1986

The General George G. Meade School is a historic elementary/middle school located in the North Central neighborhood of Philadelphia, Pennsylvania, United States.

Part of the School District of Philadelphia, it was added to the National Register of Historic Places in 1986, and is a contributing property to the Lower North Philadelphia Speculative Housing Historic District.

== History and architectural features ==
Designed by Irwin T. Catharine, the General George G. Meade School was built in 1936. It is a three-story, eleven-bay, yellow, brick building, which was created in a Moderne-style. It also has a four-story, five-bay addition, which features rounded corners, ribbon bands of windows and low relief Greek figures.

It was named for General George Meade (1815–1872).
