= J. Sylvester Ramsey School =

- U.S. National Register of Historic Places
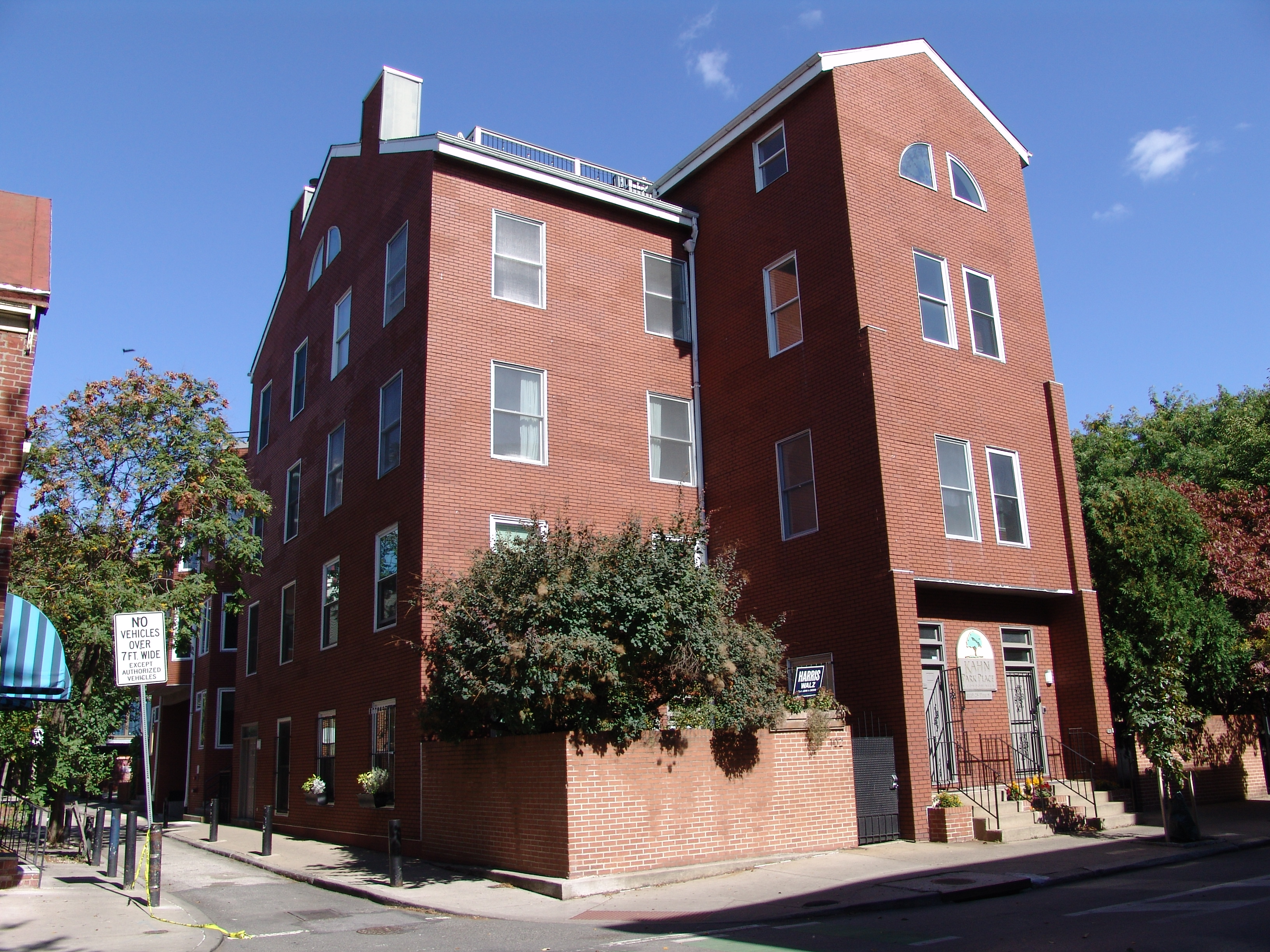
- Former site of the J. Sylvester Ramsey School in October 2024; currently an apartment building called Kahn Park Place: A Condominium.

- Location within Philadelphia Location within Pennsylvania Location within the United States
- Location: Pine & Quince Streets, Philadelphia, Pennsylvania
- Coordinates: 39°56′43″N 75°09′37″W
- Area: less than an acre
- Built: 1850 & 1894
- Architectural style: Greek Revival, Other, Vernacular Greek Revival
- MPS: Philadelphia Public Schools TR
- NRHP reference No.: 86003322
- Added to NRHP: December 1, 1986

The J. Sylvester Ramsey School was an historic school building in the Washington Square West neighborhood of Philadelphia, Pennsylvania, United States.

Added to the National Register of Historic Places in 1986, it has since been demolished.

== History and architectural features ==
Built in 1850 and designed in a vernacular Greek Revival style, this structure was a three-story, five-bay, gable-roofed building with a three-story fire tower that was added in 1894.
