= William T. Tilden Middle School =

- William J. Tilden Junior High School
- U.S. National Register of Historic Places
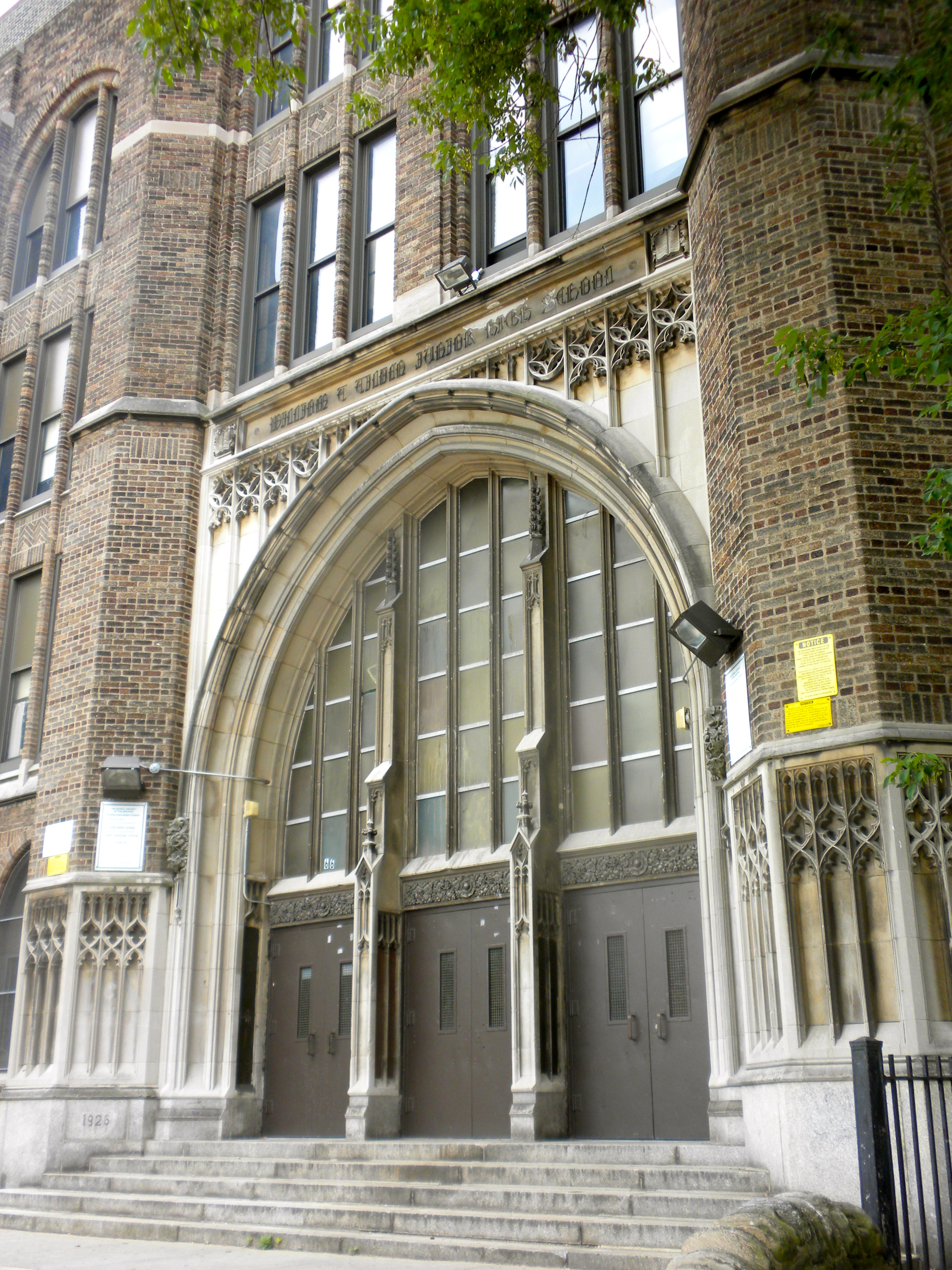
- William J. Tilden Junior High School, June 2010

- Location within Philadelphia Location within Pennsylvania Location within the United States
- Location: 6601 Elmwood Ave., Philadelphia, Pennsylvania
- Coordinates: 39.9215°N 75.2324°W
- Area: 4 acres (1.6 ha)
- Built: 1926–1927
- Architect: Irwin T. Catharine
- Architectural style: Late Gothic Revival
- MPS: Philadelphia Public Schools TR
- NRHP reference No.: 86003337
- Added to NRHP: December 1, 1986

The William T. Tilden Middle School is a historic, American middle school in the Paschall neighborhood of Philadelphia, Pennsylvania. It is part of the School District of Philadelphia.

The building was added to the National Register of Historic Places in 1986.

== History and architectural features ==
Designed by Irwin T. Catharine and built between 1926 and 1927, this historic structure is a three-story, eleven-bay, brick and limestone building that was created in the Late Gothic Revival style. It features projecting end bays with one-story entrances, brick piers, and a crenellated parapet.

The building was added to the National Register of Historic Places in 1986.
