= Joseph C. Ferguson School =

- U.S. National Register of Historic Places
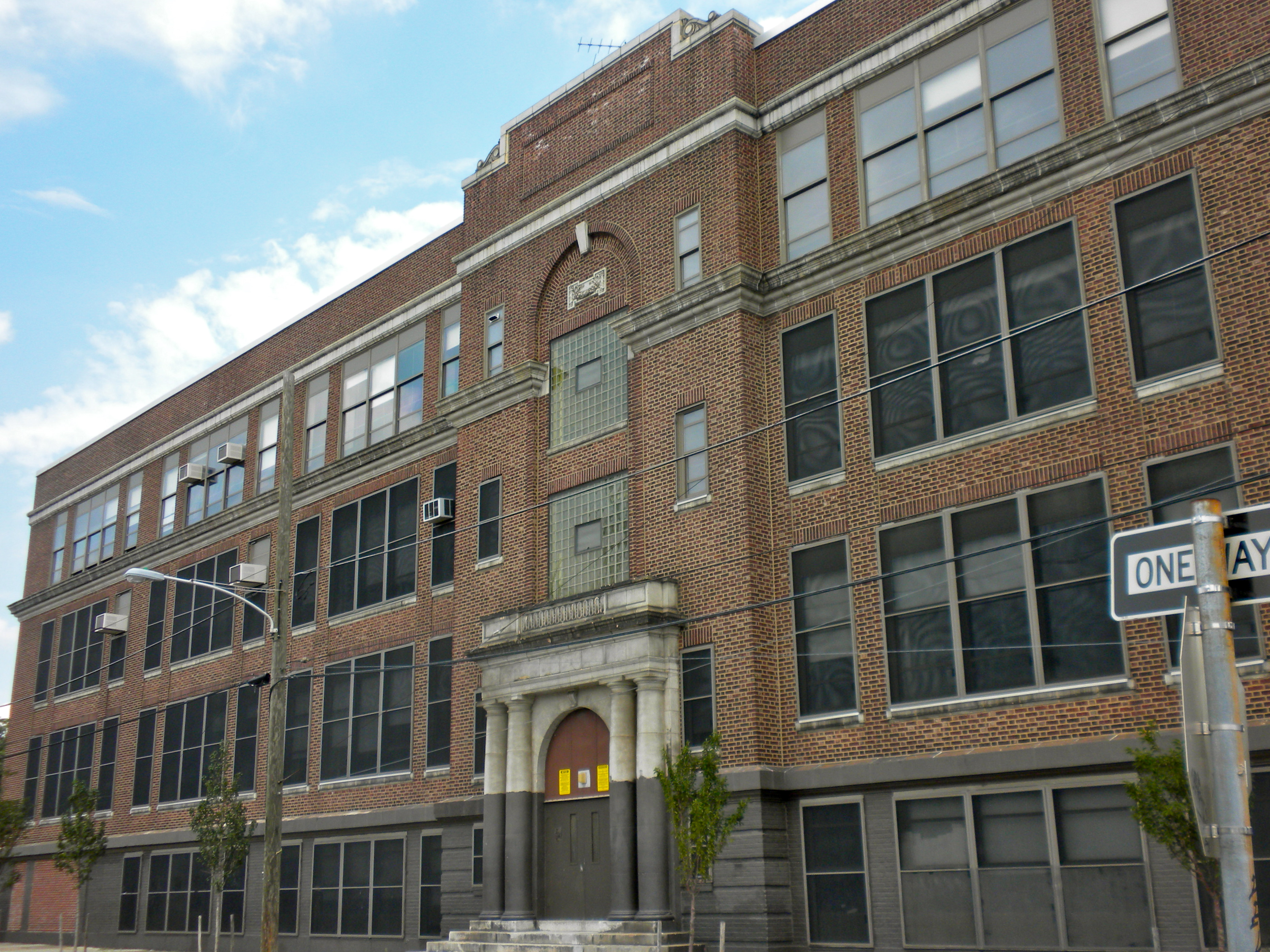
- Joseph C. Ferguson School, August 2010

- Location within Philadelphia Location within Pennsylvania Location within the United States
- Location: 2000 N. 7th St., Philadelphia, Pennsylvania
- Coordinates: 39°58′55″N 75°08′47″W
- Area: 2.5 acres (1.0 ha)
- Built: 1921–1922
- Architect: Irwin T. Catharine
- Architectural style: Colonial Revival
- MPS: Philadelphia Public Schools TR
- NRHP reference No.: 88002270
- Added to NRHP: November 18, 1988

The Joseph C. Ferguson School is a historic American school building in the Hartranft neighborhood of Philadelphia, Pennsylvania.

It was added to the National Register of Historic Places in 1988.

== History and architectural features ==
Designed by Irwin T. Catharine, this historic structure was built between 1921 and 1922. It is a three-story, nine-bay, U-shaped, brick building that sits on a raised basement. Created in the Colonial Revival style, it features large stone arches, a double stone cornice, and brick parapet. The school is named after Joseph C. Ferguson a judge that was a part of Philadelphia orphan court.

The building is currently the home of The U School, an innovative high school in the School District of Philadelphia. The U School and Building 21, two schools with a non-selective lottery-based admissions process, opened at the Ferguson building during the 2014–2015 school year. Building 21 relocated after three academic years, and The U School remains.
