= Motivation High School =

Coordinates: 39.9446°N 75.2422°W

Location
- 5900 Baltimore Avenue; Philadelphia, Pennsylvania 19153; United States

Information
- Type: Magnet high school
- School district: The School District of Philadelphia
- NCES District ID: 4218990
- NCES School ID: 421899000830
- Principal: Rennu Teli-Johnson
- Teaching staff: 19.70 (FTE)
- Grades: 9–12
- Gender: Mixed
- Enrollment: 237 (2023-2024)
- Student to teacher ratio: 12.03
- Campus type: Urban
- Colors: Royal Blue and Gold
- Mascot: Jaguar
- Website: motivationhs.philasd.org
- Last updated: 18 April 2022

Motivation High School is a district-run magnet high school in Southwest Philadelphia. Originally this was an annex of John Bartram High School for over three decades as Bartram Motivation. Subsequently, the school was located in the former Thomas Buchanan Read School before being moved to the John P. Turner Middle School building in 2013. Motivation is a liberal arts preparatory school.
