= Rudolph Walton School =

- U.S. National Register of Historic Places
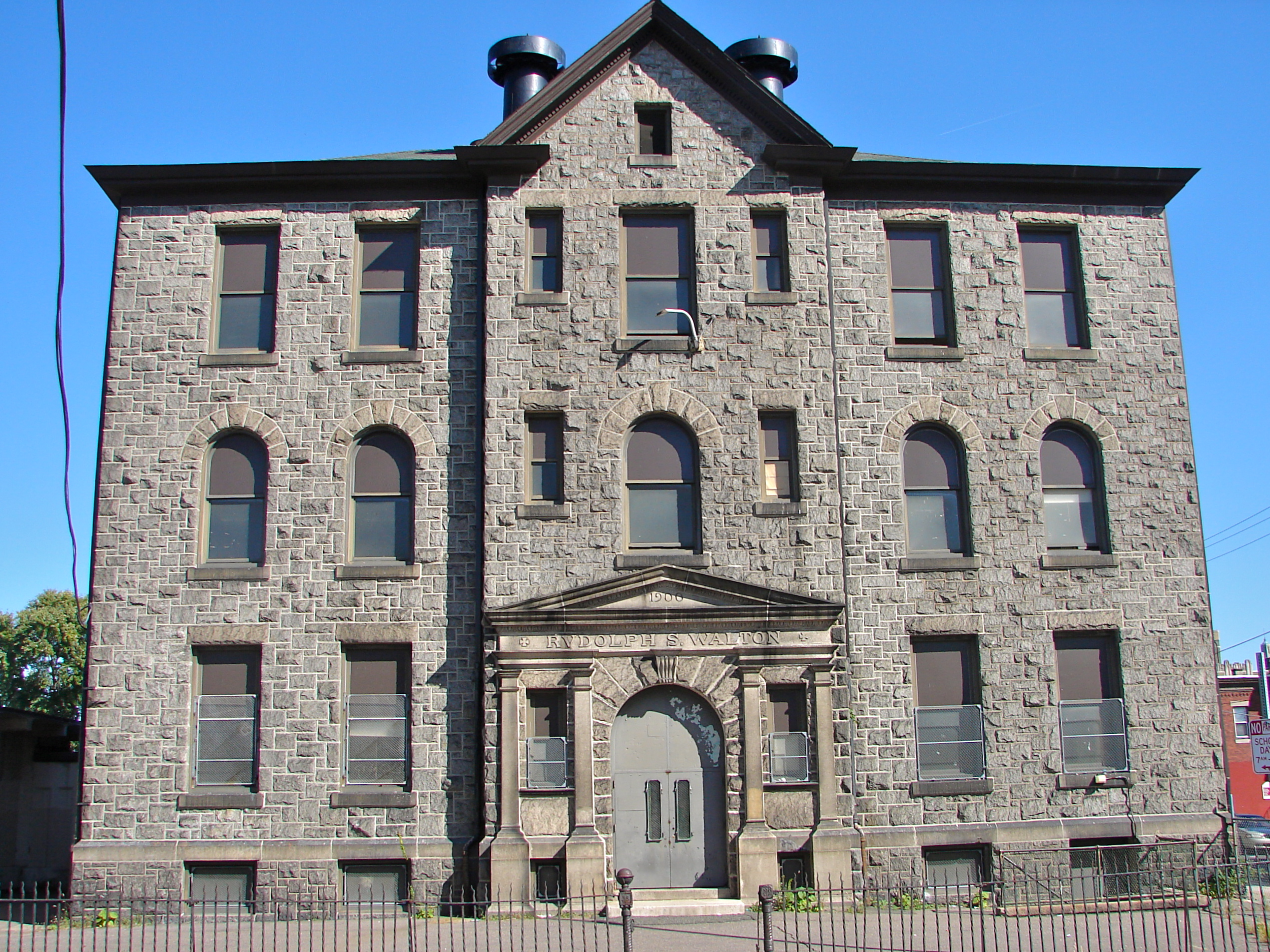
- Rudolph Walton School, September 2010

- Location within Philadelphia Location within Pennsylvania Location within the United States
- Location: 2601–2631 N. Twenty-eighth St., Philadelphia, Pennsylvania, United States
- Coordinates: 39°59′42″N 75°10′37″W
- Area: 1 acre (0.40 ha)
- Built: 1901, 1915, 1924
- Built by: T.C. Tafford
- Architectural style: Late Victorian
- MPS: Philadelphia Public Schools TR
- NRHP reference No.: 86003341
- Added to NRHP: December 4, 1986

The Rudolph Walton School is a historic school building located in the Strawberry Mansion neighborhood of Philadelphia, Pennsylvania, United States.

The building was added to the National Register of Historic Places in 1986.

== History and architectural features ==
Built between 1900 and 1901, this historic structure is a three-and-one-half-story building, that was made using coursed, cast stone ashlar and has a low hipped roof, large double hung windows, and brick additions that were built in 1915 and 1924. The projecting central entrance pavilion has a Renaissance Revival-style portico.

It was among the first schools designed by J. Horace Cook after his appointment as supervising architect for the school board. The school was named for merchant Rudolph Walton (1826–1900).

The building was added to the National Register of Historic Places in 1986. The school has been abandoned since 2003 despite attempts to re-open as a charter school.
