= Bache-Martin Elementary School =

- U.S. National Register of Historic Places
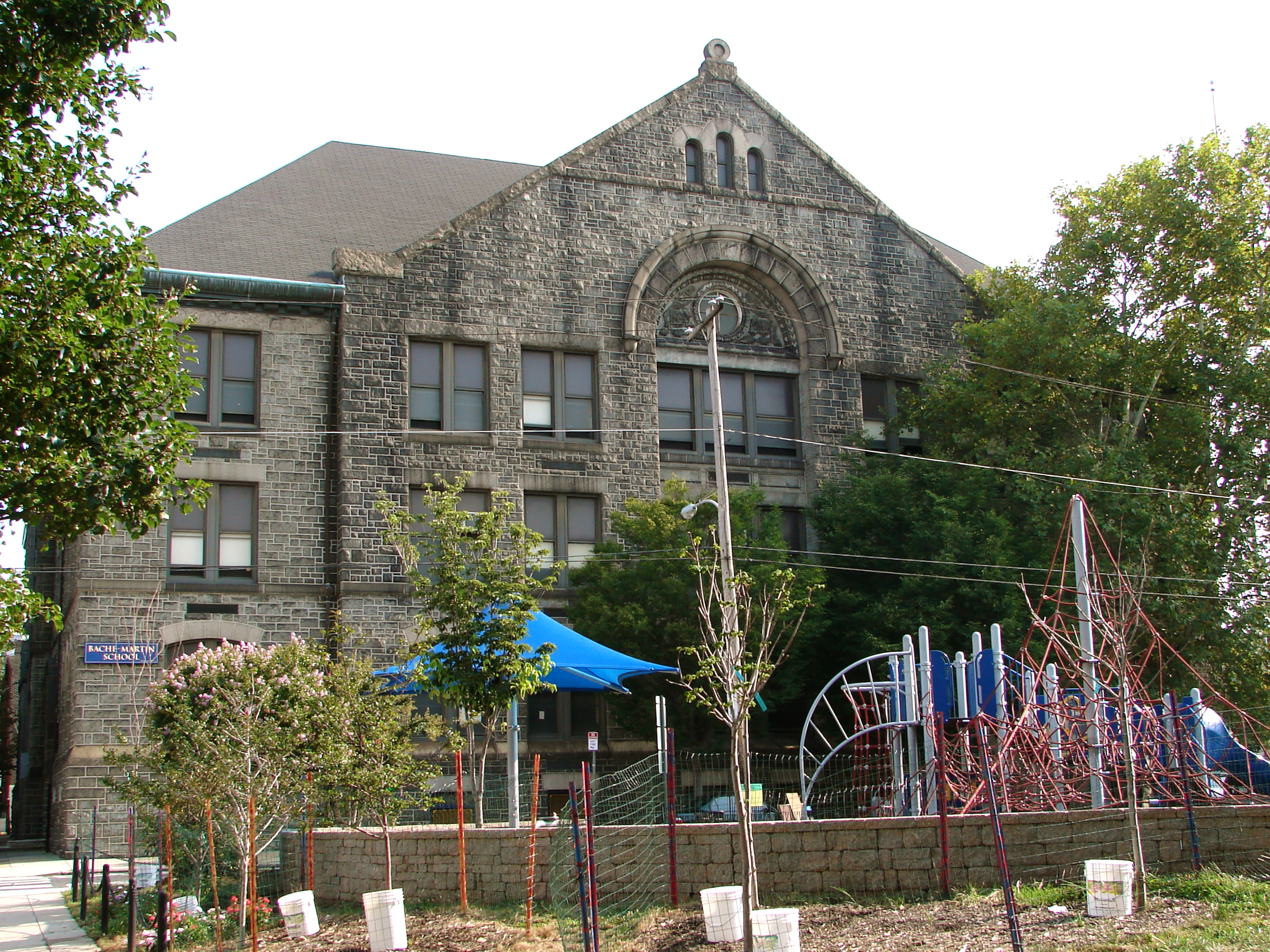
- Bache-Martin School, August 2010

- Location within Philadelphia Location within Pennsylvania Location within the United States
- Location: 801 N. Twenty-second St., Philadelphia, Pennsylvania
- Coordinates: 39.9699°N 75.1737°W
- Area: less than one acre
- Built: 1905–1906
- Built by: J.R. Wiggins Co.
- Architect: Lloyd Titus
- Architectural style: Romanesque
- MPS: Philadelphia Public Schools TR
- NRHP reference No.: 86003262
- Added to NRHP: December 4, 1986

The Bache-Martin Elementary School is a pre-kindergarten to eighth grade school which is located in the Fairmount neighborhood of Philadelphia, Pennsylvania. It is part of the School District of Philadelphia. The school campus comprises two distinct buildings along 22nd Street, both of which were listed on the National Register of Historic Places in 1986.

== Bache School ==
The Alexander Dallas Bache School was designed by Lloyd Titus and built between 1905 and 1906. It is a three-story, L-shaped, stone building, which was created in the Romanesque-style. It features a central projecting gable elaborate arched window. It is named for Philadelphia native Alexander Dallas Bache (1806–1867), an American physicist, scientist and surveyor.

== Martin School ==
- Martin School
- U.S. National Register of Historic Places
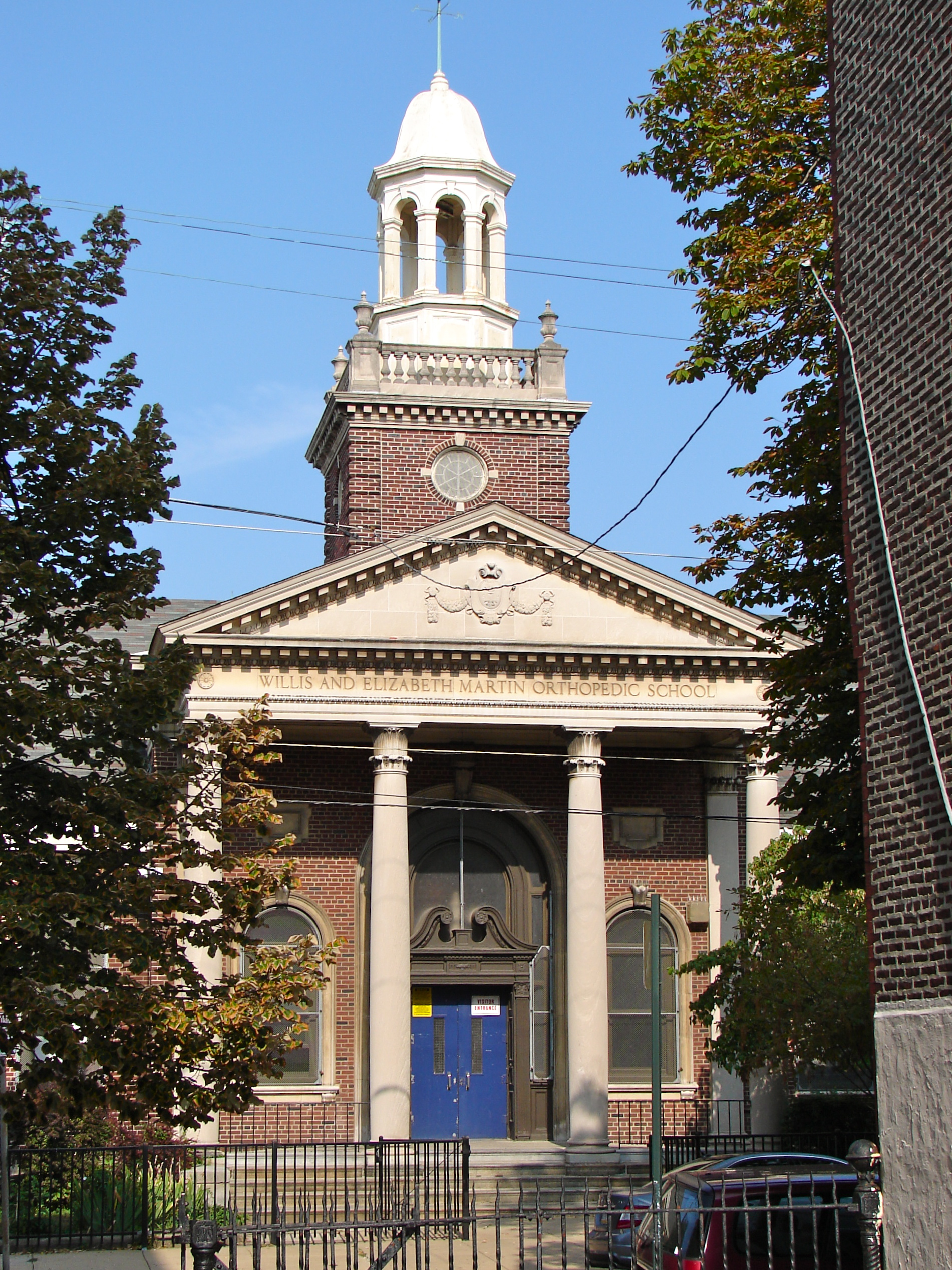
- Martin Orthopedic School, August 2010
- Location: 800 N. Twenty-second St., Philadelphia, Pennsylvania
- Area: 3 acres (1.2 ha)
- Built: 1936–1937
- Architect: Irwin T. Catharine
- Architectural style: Georgian Revival
- MPS: Philadelphia Public Schools TR
- NRHP reference No.: 86003300
- Added to NRHP: December 4, 1986

The Martin School, formerly known as the Martin Orthopedic School, also formerly known as Willis & Elizabeth Martin Orthopedic School, was designed by Irwin T. Catharine and built between 1936 and 1937. It is a one-story, ten-bay, brick and limestone building, which was designed in the Georgian Revival-style. It features a central projecting pedimented portico with Corinthian order columns and a bell tower. It was the first school in the Philadelphia school system for physically handicapped students.
