= AdvanSix =

American chemical company

AdvanSix Inc.
- Company type: Public
- Traded as: NYSE: ASIX
- Industry: Chemical company
- Founded: 2016; 10 years ago
- Headquarters: US
- Number of employees: 1,400
- Website: www.advansix.com

AdvanSix Inc. is an American chemical company that produces nylon 6 and related chemicals such as caprolactam and ammonium sulfate fertilizers. It operated as Honeywell's Resins and Chemicals division until 2016, when it was spun off as a separate company. The unit accounted for 3 percent of Honeywell's sales at the time. For 2019, revenue is estimated at $1.4 billion. The company traces its lineage to the H. W. Jayne Company, established 1884 in Frankford, Pennsylvania.

AdvanSix has plants in Chesterfield and Hopewell, Virginia, and Frankford and Pottsville, Pennsylvania. The Hopewell plant is one of the world's largest single-site producers of caprolactam. It has an annual production capacity of 600,000 tons of ammonia and 400,000 tons of caprolactam. For context, global annual demand for caprolactam is estimated at 5 million tons.

AdvanSix is an integrated chemical manufacturer. It produces phenol in Frankford through the cumene process, where it is converted to caprolactam in Hopewell, polymerized to nylon 6 in Chesterfield and made into film at Pottsville. In addition to internal use, AdvanSix sells acetone, phenol, and alpha-methylstyrene from the cumene process. They sell cyclohexanol and cyclohexanone made from phenol, caprolactam, as well as ammonium sulfate generated by the Beckmann rearrangement of cyclohexanone oxime. The company's nylon resins are used in food, liquid, and consumer packaging along with mono/multifilament products, carpet fibers, and automotive compounding.

In May 2018, federal agents swarmed the company's Hopewell plant in response to a referral from the U.S. Environmental Protection Agency. The investigation related to air emissions and was concluded in May 2019. In May 2019, the company announced that it would halt the production of biaxially-oriented nylon film in Pottsville, Pennsylvania, laying off 85 workers. This type of film is used in food packaging. The company now purchases the film from Oben Group in Lurin, Peru.
