= Muhlenberg School =

- U.S. National Register of Historic Places
- U.S. Historic district – Contributing property
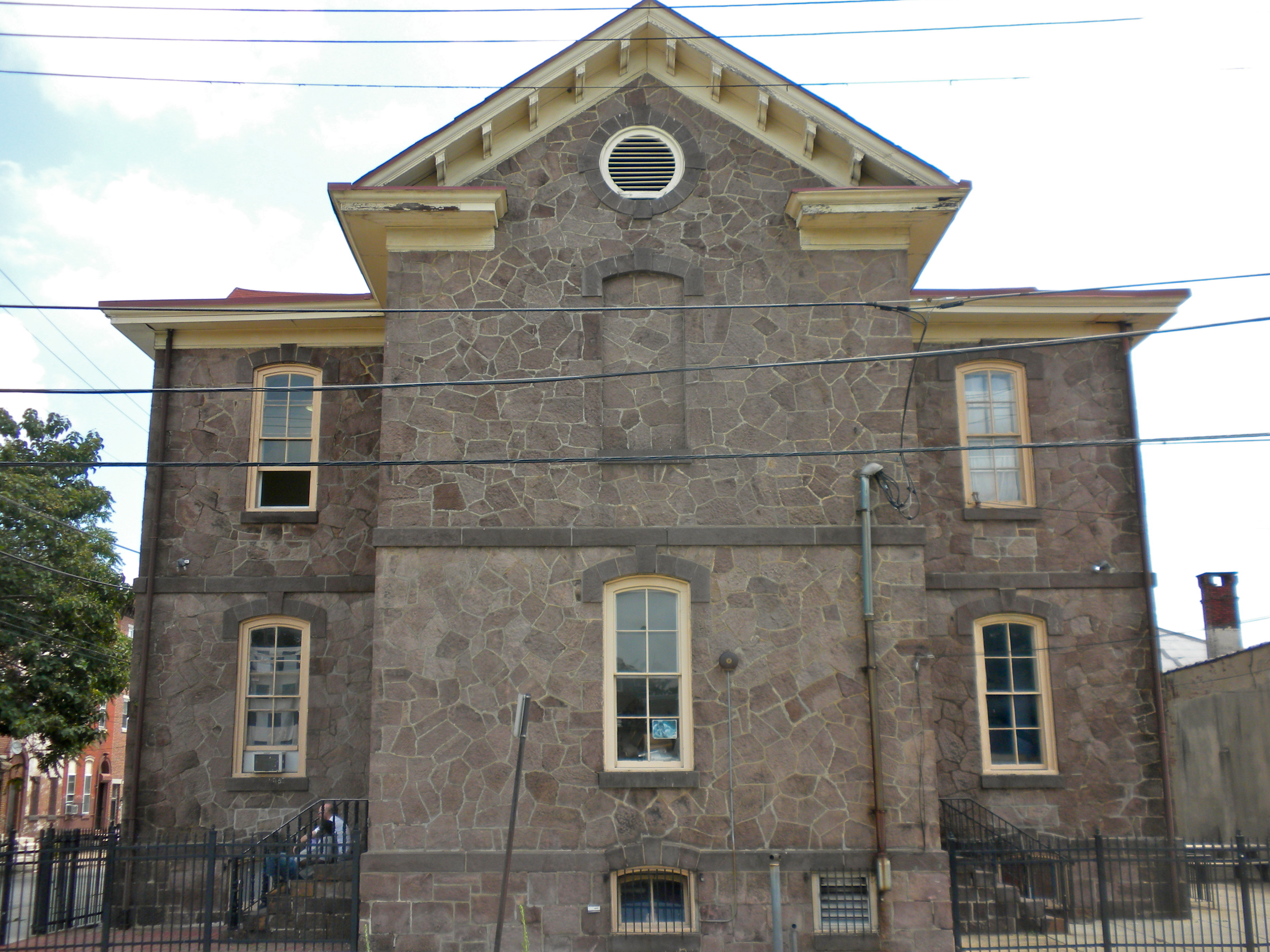
- Muhlenberg School, August 2010

- Location within Philadelphia Location within Pennsylvania Location within the United States
- Location: 1640 Master St., Philadelphia, Pennsylvania
- Coordinates: 39°58′30″N 75°09′48″W
- Area: 1.3 acres (0.53 ha)
- Built: 1874-1875
- Architect: Esler, Lewis; Tweed, Columbus
- Architectural style: Italianate
- MPS: Philadelphia Public Schools TR
- NRHP reference No.: 88002247
- Added to NRHP: November 18, 1988

The Muhlenberg School, also known as the Bishop Miller Tabernacle Church, is an historic school building in the Feltonville neighborhood of Philadelphia, Pennsylvania, United States.

It was added to the National Register of Historic Places in 1988.

== History and architectural features ==
Built between 1874 and 1875, this historic structure is a two-story, cross-gabled, stone building that is six bays wide and three bays deep. It was designed in the Italianate style.

It was added to the National Register of Historic Places in 1988. It is a contributing property to the Lower North Philadelphia Speculative Housing Historic District.
