= Richardson L. Wright School =

- U.S. National Register of Historic Places
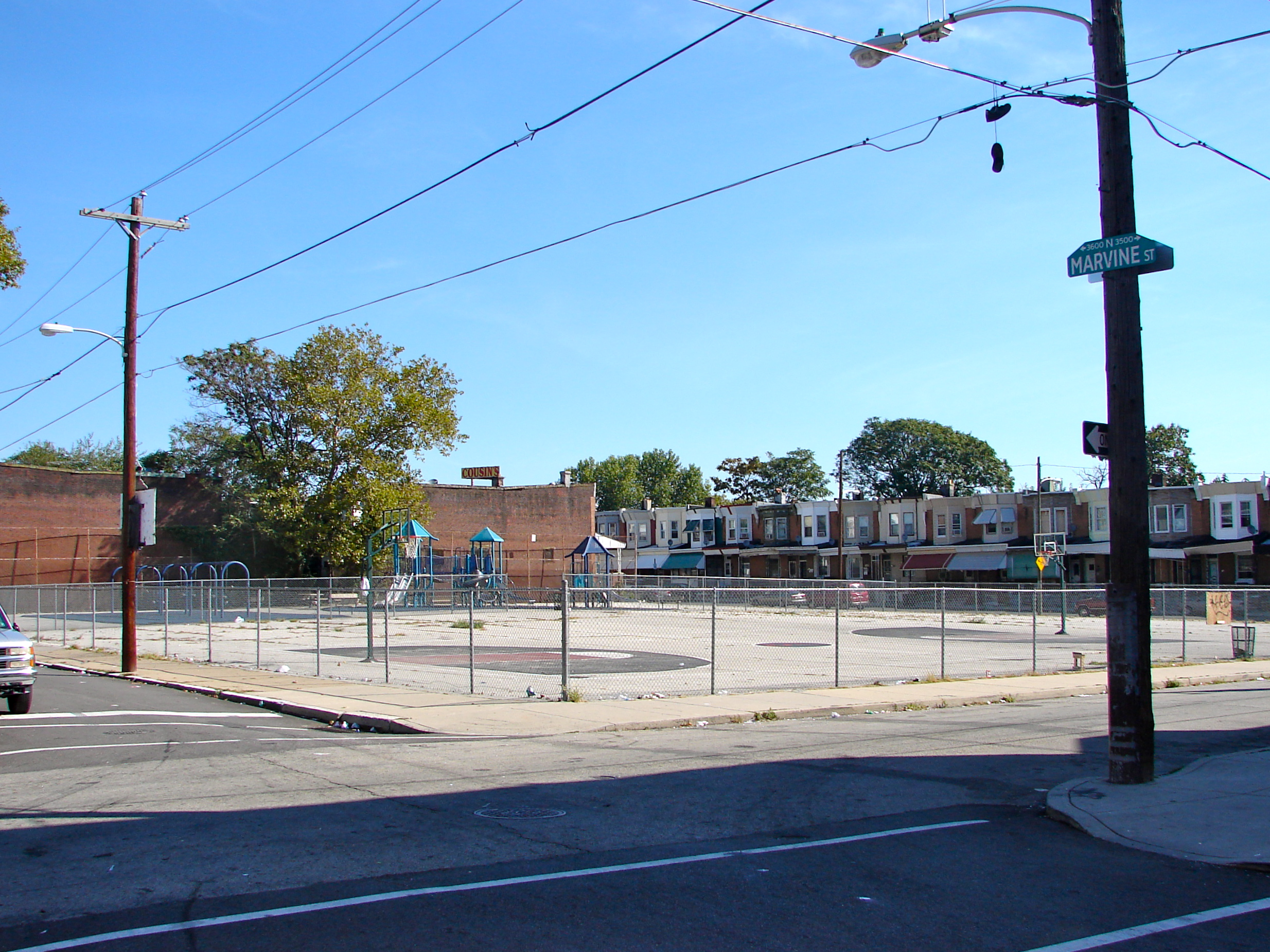
- Site of the former school

- Location within Philadelphia Location within Pennsylvania Location within the United States
- Location: 1101 Venango St., Philadelphia, Pennsylvania
- Coordinates: 40°0′25″N 75°8′46″W
- Built: 1905
- Architect: Lloyd Titus
- MPS: Philadelphia Public Schools TR
- NRHP reference No.: 86003348
- Added to NRHP: December 4, 1986

The Richardson L. Wright School was an American school that was located in the Nicetown–Tioga neighborhood in northern Philadelphia, Pennsylvania.

== History and architectural features ==
Designed by Lloyd Titus, the last non-architect to serve as the chief draftsman (1901–1905) of the Department of Buildings of the Philadelphia School Board, this school building contained three stories and was designed in the Colonial Revival style with a hipped roof. It was destroyed sometime before 2008 and replaced by ball courts.

The Richardson L. Wright School should not be confused with the Richard R. Wright School, which is currently operating in north Philadelphia.
