= Thomas Buchanan Read School =

- U.S. National Register of Historic Places
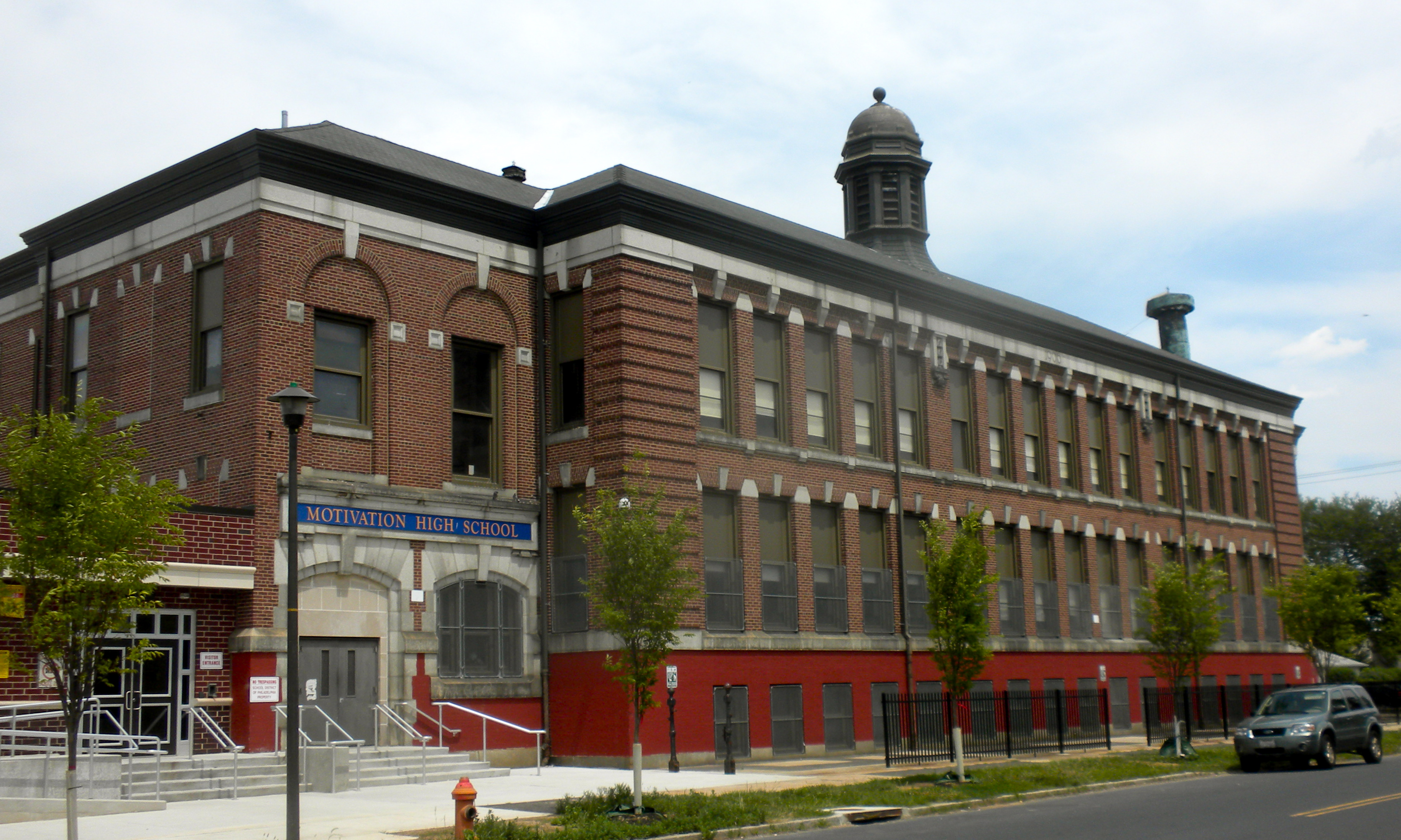
- Thomas Buchanan Read School, June 2010

- Location within Philadelphia Location within Pennsylvania Location within the United States
- Location: 78th St. and Buist Ave., Philadelphia, Pennsylvania
- Coordinates: 39.9066°N 75.2478°W
- Area: less than one acre
- Built: 1906-1908
- Built by: Stewart Construction Co.
- Architect: Henry deCoursey Richards
- Architectural style: Colonial Revival, Georgian Revival
- MPS: Philadelphia Public Schools TR
- NRHP reference No.: 86003325
- Added to NRHP: December 4, 1986

The Thomas Buchanan Read School is a historic American school building in the Elmwood Park neighborhood of Philadelphia, Pennsylvania.

It was added to the National Register of Historic Places in 1986.

== History and architectural features ==
Designed by Henry deCoursey Richards and built between 1906 and 1908, this historic structure is a two-story, twenty-bay, red brick building with limestone trim. Created in the Georgian Revival style, it features a large projecting section, recessed entrance bays, brick piers with stone capitals, and a hipped roof with copper cupola. It was named in honor of the poet and painter Thomas Buchanan Read.

It was home to the Motivation High School before the latter moved to its current location on Baltimore Avenue in 2013.
