= Olney Elementary School =

- U.S. National Register of Historic Places
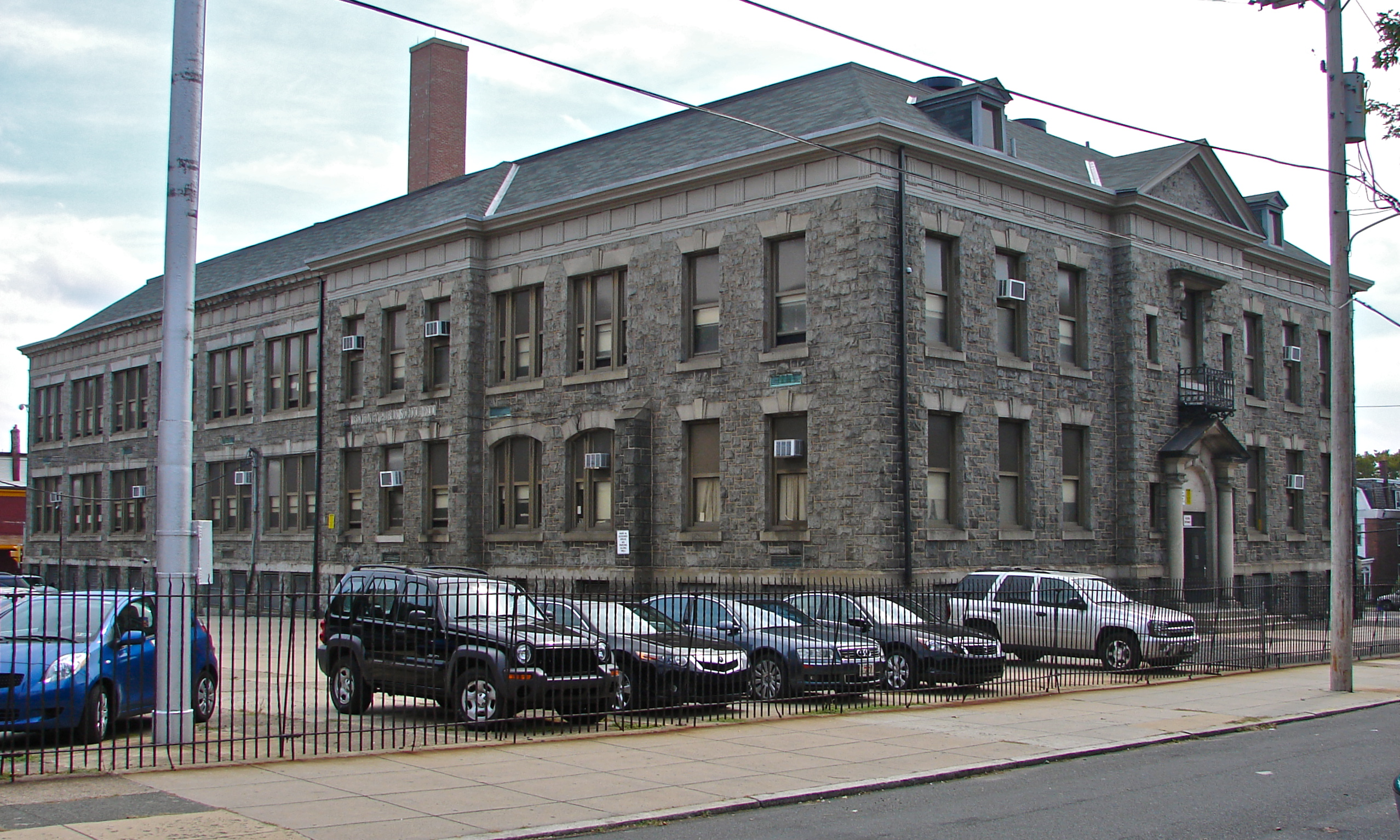
- Olney Elementary School, September 2010

- Location within Philadelphia Location within Pennsylvania Location within the United States
- Location: 5301 North Water St., Philadelphia, Pennsylvania
- Coordinates: 40°01′52″N 75°07′15″W
- Area: 1 acre (0.40 ha)
- Built: 1900–1901
- Built by: W.J. Smith
- Architect: Andrew Sauer
- Architectural style: Georgian Revival
- MPS: Philadelphia Public Schools TR
- NRHP reference No.: 86003311
- Added to NRHP: December 4, 1986

Olney Elementary School is a historic American elementary school in the Olney neighborhood of Philadelphia, Pennsylvania. It is part of the School District of Philadelphia.

The building was added to the National Register of Historic Places in 1986.

== History and architectural features ==
Built between 1900 and 1901, this historic structure is a two-story, ashlar and smooth limestone building that was designed in the Georgian Revival style. It features a projecting pedimented center bay and arched limestone entrance surround.
