= Mechanicsville School (Philadelphia) =

- U.S. National Register of Historic Places
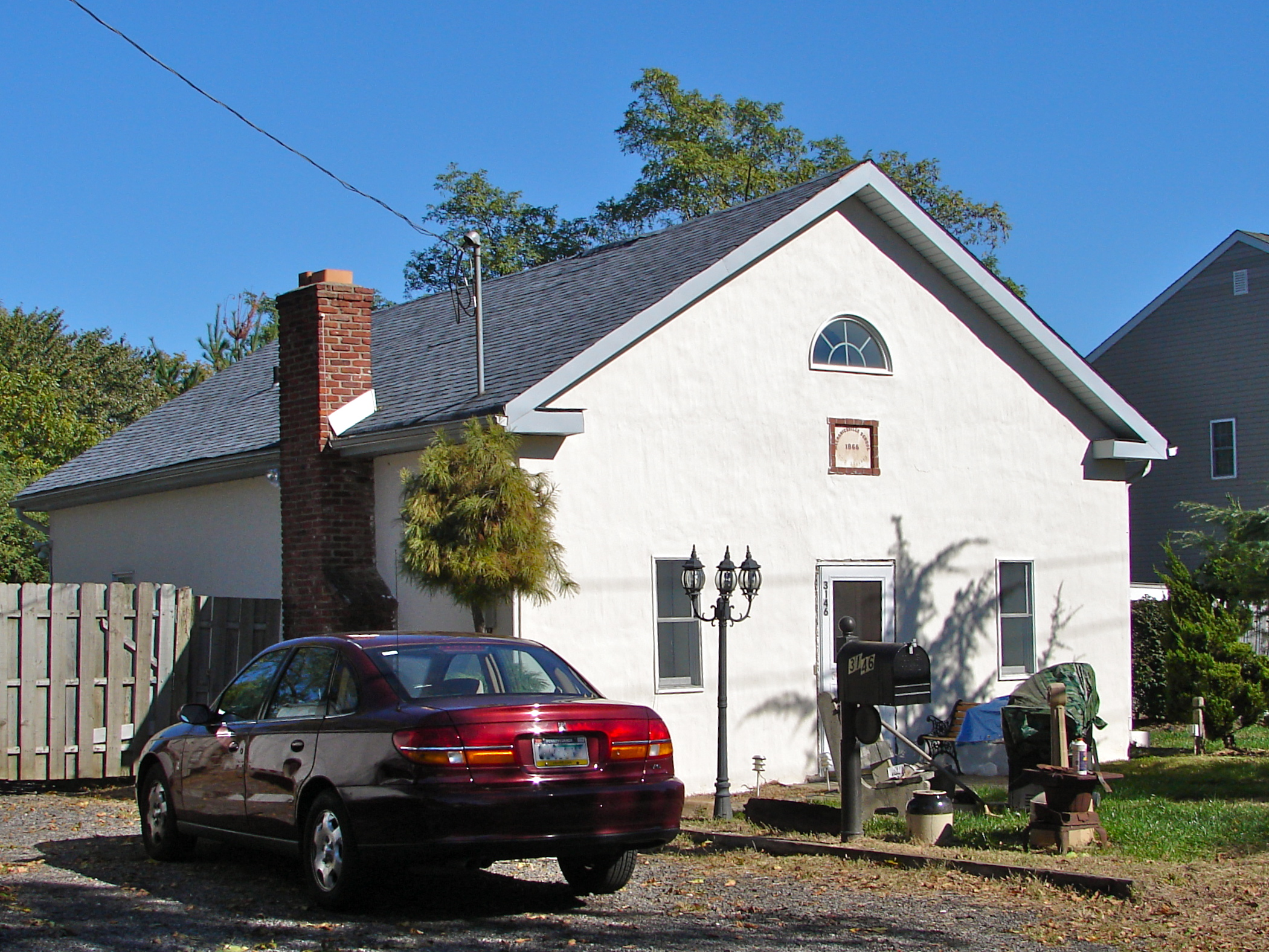
- Mechanicsville School, October 2010

- Location within Philadelphia Location within Pennsylvania Location within the United States
- Location: 3146 Mechanicsville Rd., Philadelphia, Pennsylvania
- Coordinates: 40.1074°N 74.9671°W
- Area: less than one acre
- Built: 1866–1867
- Architect: Seth K. Samm,
- MPS: Philadelphia Public Schools TR
- NRHP reference No.: 86003306
- Added to NRHP: December 1, 1986

Mechanicsville School is a former school building located in the Village of Mechanicsville neighborhood of Philadelphia, Pennsylvania. It was built in 1866–1867, and is a one-story, three-bay, vernacular stone building coated in stucco. It has a gable roof with wood cornice and brick chimney.

The building was added to the National Register of Historic Places in 1986. It is now used as a private residence.
