= George L. Horn School =

- U.S. National Register of Historic Places
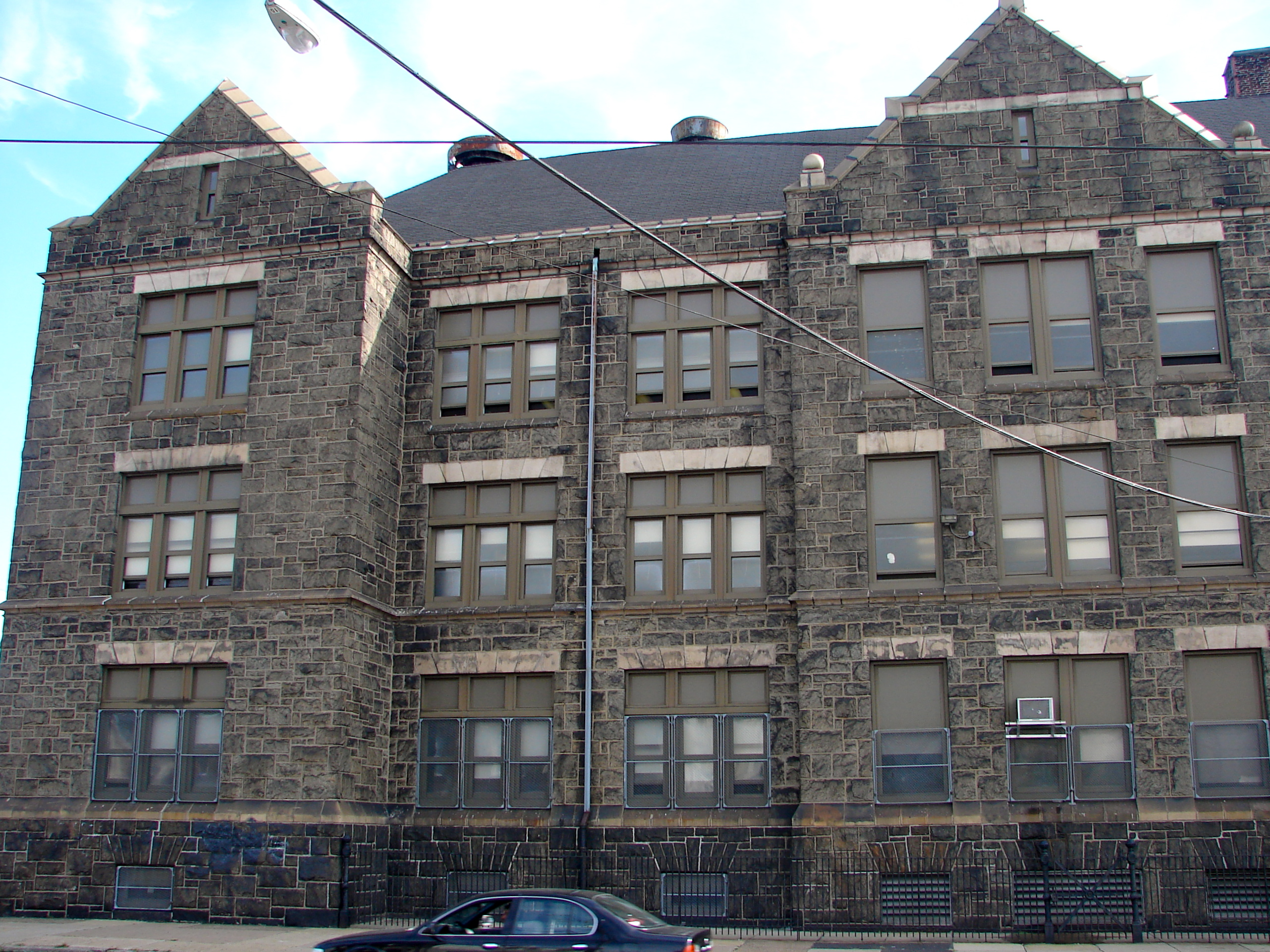
- George L. Horn School, September 2010

- Location within Philadelphia Location within Pennsylvania Location within the United States
- Location: 3701 Frankford Ave., Philadelphia, Pennsylvania, United States
- Coordinates: 39°59′58″N 75°05′55″W
- Area: 1 acre (0.40 ha)
- Built: 1902–1904
- Built by: S. Garley, Jr.
- Architect: Lloyd Titus
- Architectural style: Late Gothic Revival, Anglo-Gothic
- MPS: Philadelphia Public Schools TR
- NRHP reference No.: 86003292
- Added to NRHP: December 4, 1986

The George L. Horn School is a historic school building located in the Harrowgate neighborhood of Philadelphia, Pennsylvania, United States.

It was added to the National Register of Historic Places in 1986.

== History and architectural features ==
Built between 1902 and 1904, the George L. Horn School is a three-story, five-bay, ashlar stone building, which was designed in the Late Gothic Revival style. It features terra cotta and granite trim and a steeply pitched gable roof.

For a time the school was known as the Sheridan West Academy before being closed in 2013.
