= Thomas Dunlap School =

- U.S. National Register of Historic Places
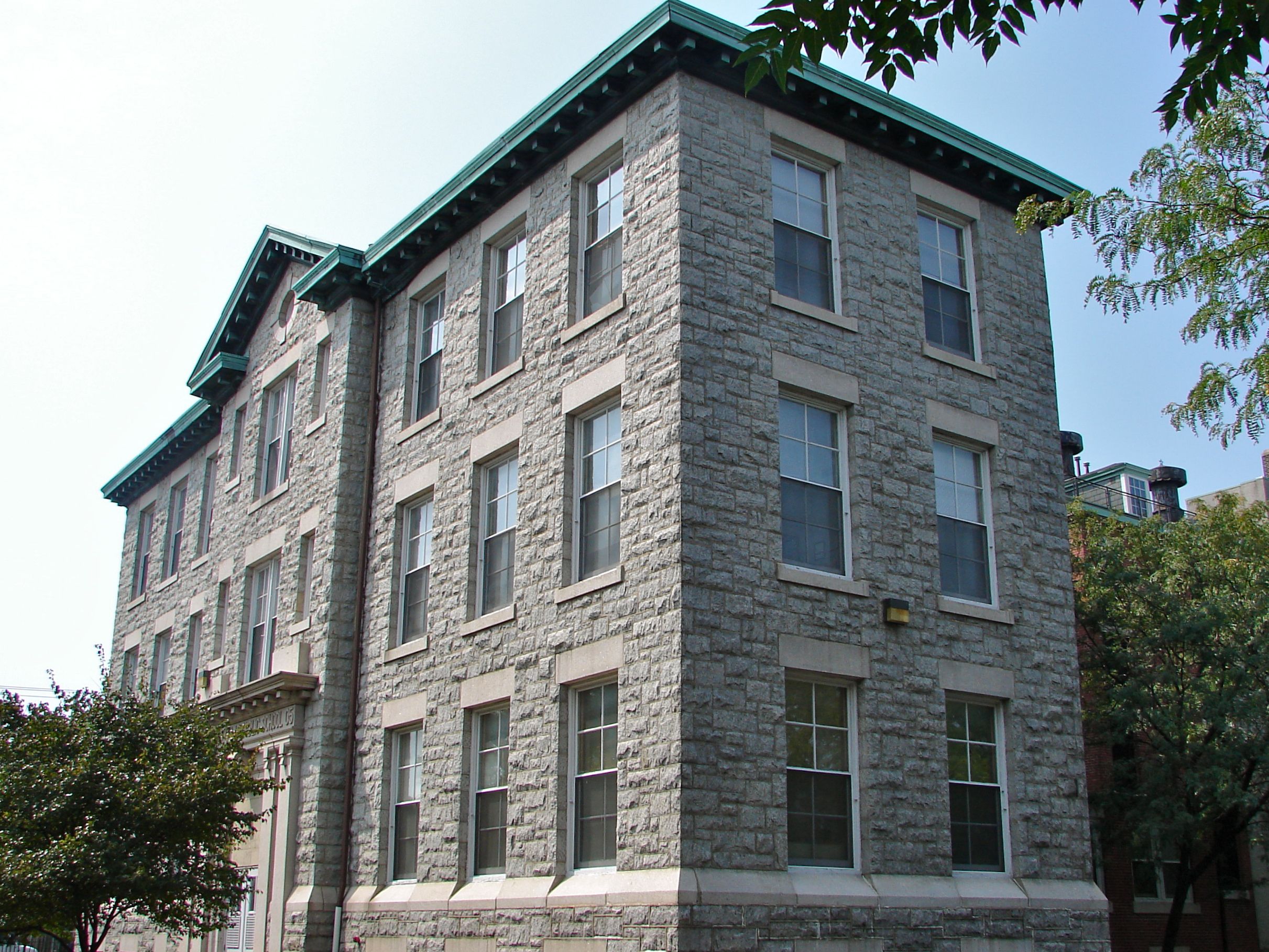
- Thomas Dunlap School, September 2010

- Location within Philadelphia Location within Pennsylvania Location within the United States
- Location: 5031 Race St., Philadelphia, Pennsylvania
- Coordinates: 39.9630°N 75.2217°W
- Area: 1 acre (0.40 ha)
- Built: 1905
- Built by: Lynch Bros.
- Architect: Lloyd Titus
- Architectural style: Colonial Revival
- MPS: Philadelphia Public Schools TR
- NRHP reference No.: 86003277
- Added to NRHP: December 4, 1986

Thomas Dunlap School is a historic, former American school building in the Haddington neighborhood of Philadelphia, Pennsylvania.

Added to the National Register of Historic Places in 1986, it is currently used as an apartment building.

== History and architectural features ==
Built in 1906, this historic structure is a three-story, nine-bay by two-bay, ashlar stone building that was designed in the Colonial Revival style. It features a projecting, center cross gable bay, paired pilasters flanking the main entrance, and a modillioned copper cornice.
