= Mifflin School =

- U.S. National Register of Historic Places
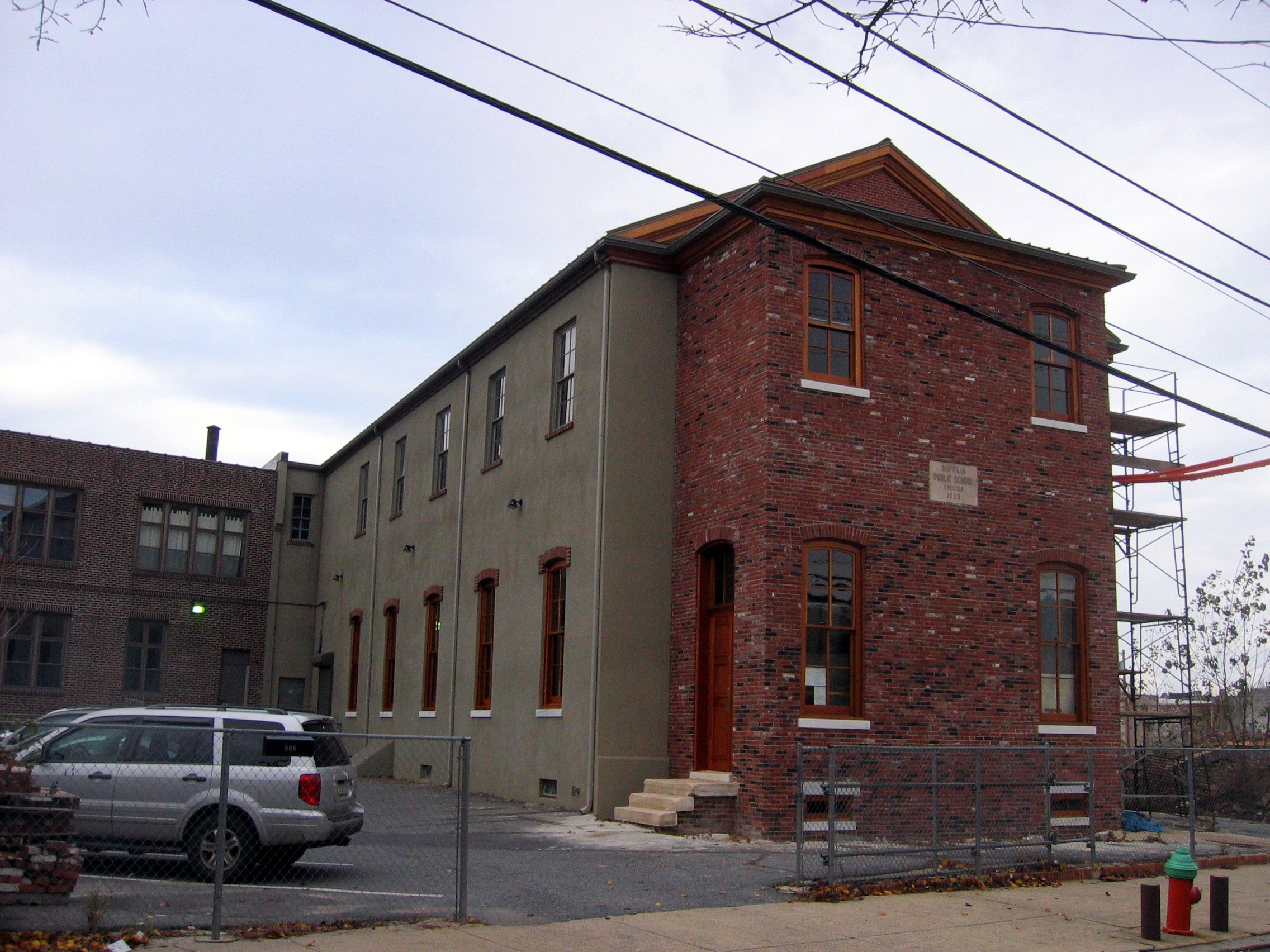

- Location within Philadelphia Location within Pennsylvania Location within the United States
- Location: 808–818 N. Third St., Philadelphia, Pennsylvania
- Coordinates: 39°57′50″N 75°08′35″W
- Area: less than one acre
- Built: 1825
- MPS: Philadelphia Public Schools TR
- NRHP reference No.: 86003308
- Added to NRHP: December 04, 1986

The Mifflin School, built in 1825, is the oldest surviving school building used in the Philadelphia public school system. It is a two-story, two-bay red brick building, which now has its side walls stuccoed over. In the first phase of the development of the public school system in Philadelphia, 1818–1850, simple school buildings were built by local authorities in a decentralized system. During this period 49 buildings were built by seven local school boards; only four of the buildings survive.

It was listed on the National Register of Historic Places in 1986.
