= George L. Brooks School =

- U.S. National Register of Historic Places
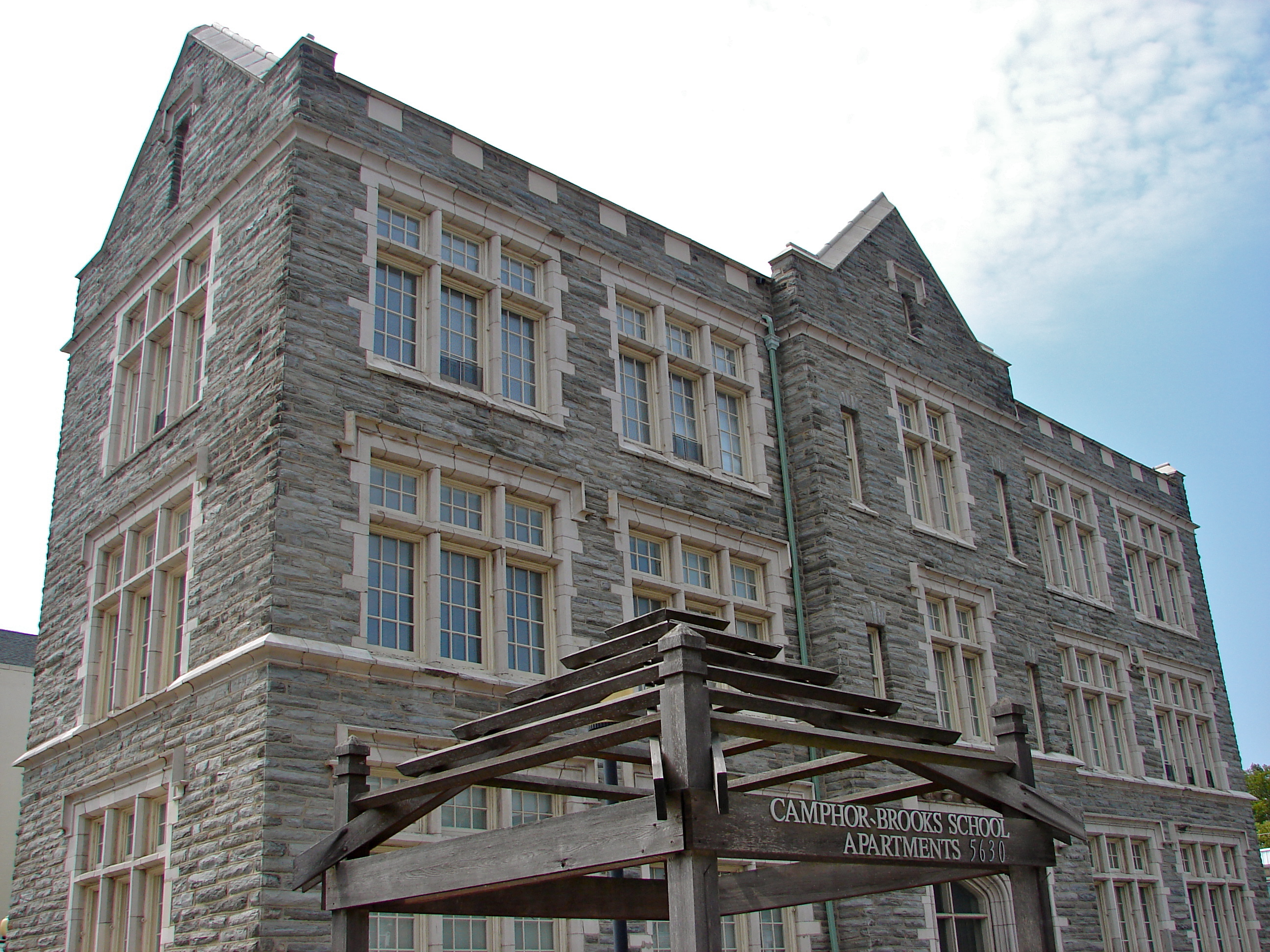
- George L. Brooks School, September 2010

- Location within Philadelphia Location within Pennsylvania Location within the United States
- Location: 5630 Wyalusing Ave., Philadelphia, Pennsylvania
- Coordinates: 39°58′06″N 75°14′01″W
- Area: 2 acres (0.81 ha)
- Built: 1902, 1919
- Architect: Lloyd Titus, Henry deCoursey Richards
- Architectural style: Late Gothic Revival, Anglo-Gothic
- MPS: Philadelphia Public Schools TR
- NRHP reference No.: 86003266
- Added to NRHP: December 4, 1986

The George L. Brooks School is a historic former school building in the Haddington neighborhood of Philadelphia, Pennsylvania.

It was added to the National Register of Historic Places in 1988.

== History and architectural features ==
Designed by Henry deCourcy Richards and built in 1919, the George L. Brooks School encompasses part of the original walls of the school's 1902 edifice that had been destroyed by fire. It is a three-story, five-bay, stone and brick building situated on a raised basement, and was designed in the Late Gothic Revival-style. It features a slightly projecting entrance bay with Gothic arched entryway and a crenellated parapet. It is currently used as senior housing.
