= National Register of Historic Places listings in Northeast Philadelphia =

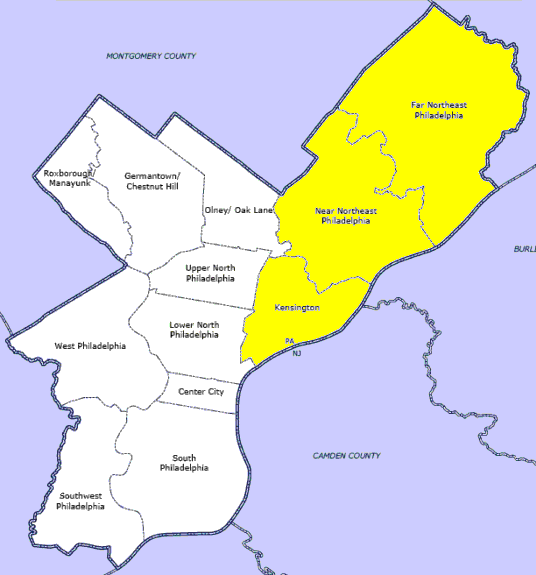
Location of Northeast Philadelphia in Philadelphia

This is a list of the National Register of Historic Places listings in Northeast Philadelphia.

This is intended to be a complete list of the properties and districts on the National Register of Historic Places in Northeast Philadelphia, Pennsylvania, United States. The locations of National Register properties and districts for which the latitude and longitude coordinates are included below, may be seen in an online map.

There are 620 properties and districts listed on the National Register in Philadelphia, including 68 National Historic Landmarks. Northeast Philadelphia includes 78 of these properties and districts, including 1 National Historic Landmark; the city's remaining properties and districts are listed elsewhere. One site is split between Northeast Philadelphia and other parts of the city, and is thus included on multiple lists.

== Current listings ==
	Name on the Register	Image	Date listed	Location	Neighborhood	Description
1	26th District Police and Patrol Station	26th District Police and Patrol Station	July 12, 1984 (#84003550)	2136–2142 East Dauphin Street; 39°58′52″N 75°07′44″W	Kensington	
2	Adams Avenue Bridge	Adams Avenue Bridge	June 22, 1988 (#88000851)	Adams Avenue over Tacony Creek; 40°02′31″N 75°06′48″W	Olney	Extends into North Philadelphia
3	Albion Carpet Mill	Albion Carpet Mill	January 12, 2016 (#15000973)	1833 E. Hagert Street; 39°59′10″N 75°07′48″W	Kensington	
4	Ethan Allen School	Ethan Allen School	November 18, 1988 (#88002227)	3001 Robbins Avenue; 40°01′47″N 75°03′44″W	Mayfair	
5	William W. Axe School	William W. Axe School	November 18, 1988 (#88002240)	1721 Kinsey Street; 40°00′44″N 75°05′02″W	Frankford	
6	Beatty's Mills Factory Building	Beatty's Mills Factory Building	August 18, 2004 (#04000881)	2446–2468 Coral Street; 39°59′04″N 75°07′43″W	Kensington	
7	Blumenthal Brothers Chocolate Factory	Blumenthal Brothers Chocolate Factory	February 27, 2023 (#100008646)	2211 Margaret Street; 40°00′31″N 75°04′35″W		
8	Bridesburg School	Bridesburg School	April 10, 1989 (#88002285)	2624 Haworth Street; 40°00′10″N 75°04′05″W	Bridesburg	
9	William Brown Company Hosiery Mill	William Brown Company Hosiery Mill	January 17, 2019 (#100003320)	3406 J Street; 39°59′59″N 75°06′31″W	Fairhill	
10	Joseph H. Brown Elementary School	Joseph H. Brown Elementary School	November 18, 1988 (#88002250)	8118–8120 Frankford Avenue; 40°02′36″N 75°01′29″W	Holmesburg	
11	Brownhill & Kramer Hosiery Mill	Brownhill & Kramer Hosiery Mill	March 31, 2014 (#14000096)	416 Memphis Street & 1429 E. Columbia Avenue; 39°58′26″N 75°07′56″W	Fishtown	
12	H.W. Butterworth and Sons Company Building	H.W. Butterworth and Sons Company Building	June 28, 2010 (#10000406)	2410 East York Street; 39°58′39″N 75°07′29″W	Kensington	
13	Laura H. Carnell School	Laura H. Carnell School	November 18, 1988 (#88002251)	6101 Summerdale Avenue; 40°02′20″N 75°05′03″W	Oxford Circle	
14	Charles Carroll Public School	Charles Carroll Public School	September 25, 2018 (#100002986)	2700 E. Auburn Street; 39°58′47″N 75°06′37″W	Port Richmond	
15	Watson Comly School	Watson Comly School	November 18, 1988 (#88002324)	13250 Trevose Road; 40°07′36″N 75°00′46″W	Somerton	
16	Russell H. Conwell School	Russell H. Conwell School	November 18, 1988 (#88002258)	1829–1951 East Clearfield Street; 39°59′39″N 75°06′54″W	Port Richmond	
17	Thomas Creighton School	Thomas Creighton School	November 18, 1988 (#88002260)	5401 Tabor Road; 40°02′04″N 75°06′19″W	Crescentville	
18	Kennedy Crossan School	Kennedy Crossan School	November 18, 1988 (#88002261)	7341 Palmetto Street; 40°03′43″N 75°04′54″W	Burholme	
19	Crown Can Company Building	Crown Can Company Building	November 20, 2018 (#100003136)	956 E. Erie Avenue; 40°00′20″N 75°06′41″W	Juniata	
20	The Delaware Station of the Philadelphia Electric Company	The Delaware Station of the Philadelphia Electric Company	August 10, 2016 (#16000427)	1325 Beach Street; 39°58′03″N 75°07′40″W	Fishtown	
21	Hamilton Disston School	Hamilton Disston School	November 18, 1988 (#88002262)	6801 Cottage Street; 40°01′42″N 75°02′50″W	Tacony	
22	Mary Disston School	Mary Disston School	November 18, 1988 (#88002319)	4521 Longshore Avenue; 40°01′42″N 75°02′40″W	Tacony	
23	Henry R. Edmunds School	Henry R. Edmunds School	November 18, 1988 (#88002266)	1149 Haworth Street; 40°01′30″N 75°05′12″W	Northwood	
24	Edward Corner Marine Merchandise Warehouse	Edward Corner Marine Merchandise Warehouse	October 6, 2020 (#100005654)	1100-1102 North Delaware Avenue; 39°57′58″N 75°07′54″W	Fishtown	
25	Fayette School	Fayette School	December 4, 1986 (#86003295)	Old Bustleton and Welsh Roads; 40°04′56″N 75°02′20″W	Bustleton	
26	First Federal Savings and Loan Association of Philadelphia, Northeast Branch	First Federal Savings and Loan Association of Philadelphia, Northeast Branch	April 5, 2019 (#100003595)	1907-1925 Cottman Avenue; 40°03′07″N 75°04′02″W	Rhawnhurst	
27	Edwin Forrest School	Edwin Forrest School	November 18, 1988 (#88002273)	4300 Bleigh Street; 40°02′04″N 75°02′10″W	Mayfair	
28	Frankford Arsenal	Frankford Arsenal	March 16, 1972 (#72001153)	Tacony and Bridge Streets; 40°00′28″N 75°04′00″W	Frankford	Boundary decrease approved December 28, 2017.
29	Frankford Avenue Bridge	Frankford Avenue Bridge	June 22, 1988 (#88000803)	Frankford Avenue over the Pennypack Creek; 40°02′37″N 75°01′14″W	Holmesburg	
30	Frankford Avenue Bridge	Frankford Avenue Bridge	June 22, 1988 (#88000850)	Frankford Avenue over Poquessing Creek; 40°03′53″N 74°58′53″W	Torresdale	Extends into Bucks County
31	Benjamin Franklin Academics Plus School	Benjamin Franklin Academics Plus School	November 18, 1988 (#88002274)	5739 Rising Sun Avenue; 40°02′33″N 75°06′15″W	Crescentville	
32	Franklin Carpet Mill	Franklin Carpet Mill	April 17, 2018 (#100002340)	2143 E. Huntingdon Street; 39°59′02″N 75°07′23″W	Kensington	
33	Friends Hospital	Friends Hospital	January 20, 1999 (#99000629)	4641 Roosevelt Boulevard; 40°01′36″N 75°06′07″W	Northwood	First private psychiatric hospital in the U.S., founded 1813
34	Glen Foerd on the Delaware	Glen Foerd on the Delaware	November 20, 1979 (#79002320)	5001 Grant Avenue; 40°03′05″N 74°58′44″W	Torresdale	Glen Foerd on the Delaware is a historic estate located at the confluence of the Poquessing Creek and Delaware River. It is listed on the National Register of Historic Places and the Historic American Landscape Survey. www.glenfoerd.org
35	Greenbelt Knoll Historic District	Greenbelt Knoll Historic District	December 14, 2010 (#10001030)	1–19 Longford Street, roughly bounded by Holme Avenue and Pennypack Park Greenway; 40°03′23″N 75°01′20″W	Pennypack	
36	Green Tree Tavern	Green Tree Tavern	June 27, 1980 (#80003612)	260–262 East Girard Avenue; 39°58′11″N 75°07′54″W	Fishtown	
37	Warren G. Harding Junior High School	Warren G. Harding Junior High School	November 18, 1988 (#88002277)	2000 Wakeling Street; 40°00′47″N 75°04′28″W	Frankford	
38	Holme Avenue Bridge	Holme Avenue Bridge	June 22, 1988 (#88000806)	Holme Avenue over Wooden Bridge Run; 40°03′23″N 75°01′27″W	Pennypack	
39	Francis Hopkinson School	Francis Hopkinson School	November 18, 1988 (#88002282)	1301–1331 East Luzerne Avenue; 40°00′30″N 75°06′09″W	Juniata	
40	George L. Horn School	George L. Horn School	December 4, 1986 (#86003292)	Frankford and Castor Avenues; 39°59′58″N 75°05′55″W	Port Richmond	
41	Harrison & Kaye Hoyle Textile Mill	Harrison & Kaye Hoyle Textile Mill	January 24, 2022 (#100007364)	118-160 East Indiana Avenue; 39°59′43″N 75°07′43″W	Fairhill	
42	John Paul Jones Junior High School	John Paul Jones Junior High School	November 18, 1988 (#88002287)	2922 Memphis Street; 39°59′10″N 75°06′46″W	Port Richmond	
43	Kensington High School for Girls	Kensington High School for Girls	November 18, 1988 (#88002288)	2075 East Cumberland Street; 39°59′03″N 75°07′35″W	Kensington	
44	Knowlton Mansion	Knowlton Mansion	October 1, 1974 (#74001803)	8001 Verree Road; 40°04′24″N 75°04′28″W	Fox Chase	
45	Lawndale School	Lawndale School	November 18, 1988 (#88002254)	600 Hellerman Street; 40°02′59″N 75°05′31″W	Lawndale	
46	Henry Longfellow School	Henry Longfellow School	November 18, 1988 (#88002294)	5004–5098 Tacony Street; 40°00′31″N 75°04′17″W	Frankford	
47	Carl Mackley Houses	Carl Mackley Houses	May 6, 1998 (#98000401)	1401 East Bristol Street; 40°00′44″N 75°05′55″W	Juniata	
48	John Marshall School	John Marshall School	November 18, 1988 (#88002298)	1501–1527 Sellers Street; 40°00′53″N 75°05′15″W	Frankford	
49	James Martin School	James Martin School	November 18, 1988 (#88002299)	3340 Richmond Street; 39°59′08″N 75°05′50″W	Port Richmond	
50	Mechanicsville School	Mechanicsville School	December 1, 1986 (#86003306)	Mechanicsville Road; 40°06′27″N 74°58′02″W	Parkwood	
51	Mill-Rae	Mill-Rae	January 12, 2017 (#100000502)	13475 Proctor Rd. 40°07′39″N 75°00′31″W	Somerton	
52	Morse Elevator Works Historic District	Morse Elevator Works Historic District	January 15, 2026 (#100012554)	1101-03, 1105-09, 1111-13, and 1115-27 Frankford Ave; 121-31 E. Wildey Street; 1100-06 and 1108-10 Shackamaxon Street; and 1045-49 Sarah Street; 39°58′04″N 75°08′03″W	Fishtown	
53	Penn Treaty Junior High School	Penn Treaty Junior High School	November 18, 1988 (#88002311)	600 East Thompson Street; 39°58′22″N 75°07′38″W	Fishtown	
54	Penn Asylum for Indigent Widows and Single Women	Penn Asylum for Indigent Widows and Single Women	June 29, 2023 (#100008541)	1401 East Susquehanna Avenue; 39°58′31″N 75°07′35″W	Fishtown	
55	Thomas Powers School	Thomas Powers School	December 4, 1986 (#86003319)	Frankford Avenue and Somerset Street; 39°59′20″N 75°07′11″W	Port Richmond	
56	Richmond School	Richmond School	November 18, 1988 (#88002316)	2942 Belgrade Street; 39°59′00″N 75°06′38″W	Port Richmond	
57	Richmond Station, Philadelphia Electric Company	Richmond Station, Philadelphia Electric Company	November 4, 2021 (#100007095)	4101 North Delaware Ave. 39°59′05″N 75°04′31″W		
58	John Ruan House	John Ruan House	October 31, 1985 (#85003410)	4278–4280 Griscom Street; 40°00′40″N 75°05′25″W	Frankford	
59	Ryerss Mansion	Ryerss Mansion	November 21, 1976 (#76001669)	Central and Cottman Avenues; 40°04′07″N 75°05′19″W	Fox Chase	
60	Sandoz Chemical Works	Sandoz Chemical Works	November 4, 2021 (#100007094)	2215 East Tioga Street; 39°59′39″N 75°06′04″W	Port Richmond	
61	Schlichter Jute Cordage Company	Schlichter Jute Cordage Company	August 9, 2021 (#100006791)	2155 Castor Avenue; 39°59′54″N 75°05′51″W	Kensington	
62	Philip H. Sheridan School	Philip H. Sheridan School	November 18, 1988 (#88002322)	800–818 East Ontario Street; 39°59′59″N 75°06′51″W	Kensington	
63	Franklin Smedley School	Franklin Smedley School	November 18, 1988 (#88002323)	5199 Mulberry Street; 40°01′11″N 75°04′26″W	Frankford	
64	Stanley	Stanley	May 10, 2005 (#05000415)	8500 Pine Road; 40°05′25″N 75°04′29″W	Fox Chase	Extends into Montgomery County
65	Star Carpet Mill	Star Carpet Mill	April 27, 2023 (#100008868)	1801 North Howard Street; 39°58′39″N 75°08′05″W		
66	James J. Sullivan School	James J. Sullivan School	November 18, 1988 (#88002327)	5300 Ditman Street; 40°00′58″N 75°04′00″W	Frankford	
67	Tacony Disston Community Development Historic District	Tacony Disston Community Development Historic District	May 16, 2016 (#16000257)	Roughly bounded by the 4700 block of Magee Street, Princeton & Tyson Avenues, and the 6900 block of Cottage Street. 40°02′07″N 75°03′26″W	Tacony	
68	Tacony Music Hall	Tacony Music Hall	March 9, 1990 (#90000413)	4817 Longshore Avenue; 40°01′29″N 75°02′32″W	Tacony	
69	Textile National Bank		March 30, 2026 (#100012864)	1801 E. Huntingdon Street; 39°59′19″N 75°07′38″W		
70	Times Finishing Works	Times Finishing Works	July 5, 2016 (#16000428)	1142 N. American Street; 39°58′07″N 75°08′27″W		
71	Tioga Mills	Tioga Mills	August 4, 2021 (#100006783)	3475 Collins Street, also known as 2126 East Tioga Street; 39°59′43″N 75°06′09″W		
72	Weisbrod & Hess Brewery	Weisbrod & Hess Brewery	February 6, 2025 (#100011438)	2421 Martha Street; 2423-39 Amber Street; 39°58′57″N 75°07′39″W	Kensington	
73	Henry Whitaker's Sons' Mill	Henry Whitaker's Sons' Mill	February 4, 2021 (#100006096)	2000 East Westmoreland Street; 39°59′42″N 75°06′31″W	Kensington	
74	Francis E. Willard School	Francis E. Willard School	December 4, 1986 (#86003346)	Emerald and Orleans Streets; 39°59′30″N 75°07′01″W	Port Richmond	
75	David Wilmot School	David Wilmot School	November 18, 1988 (#88002289)	1734 Meadow Street; 40°00′50″N 75°04′51″W	Frankford	
76	Windsor Manufacturing Company	Windsor Manufacturing Company	March 25, 2024 (#100010102)	169 West Berks Street; 40°00′13″N 75°05′52″W		
77	Peter Woll and Sons Factory	Peter Woll and Sons Factory	August 31, 2020 (#100005520)	169 West Berks Street; 39°58′44″N 75°08′10″W	Norris Square	
78	Woodrow Wilson Junior High School	Woodrow Wilson Junior High School	December 4, 1986 (#86003347)	Cottman Avenue and Loretto Street; 40°03′09″N 75°04′08″W	Castor Gardens	Now the Castor Gardens Middle School

== See also ==
- List of National Historic Landmarks in Philadelphia
- National Register of Historic Places listings in Philadelphia, Pennsylvania
