= Crescentville, Philadelphia =

Crescentville
- Neighborhood of Philadelphia
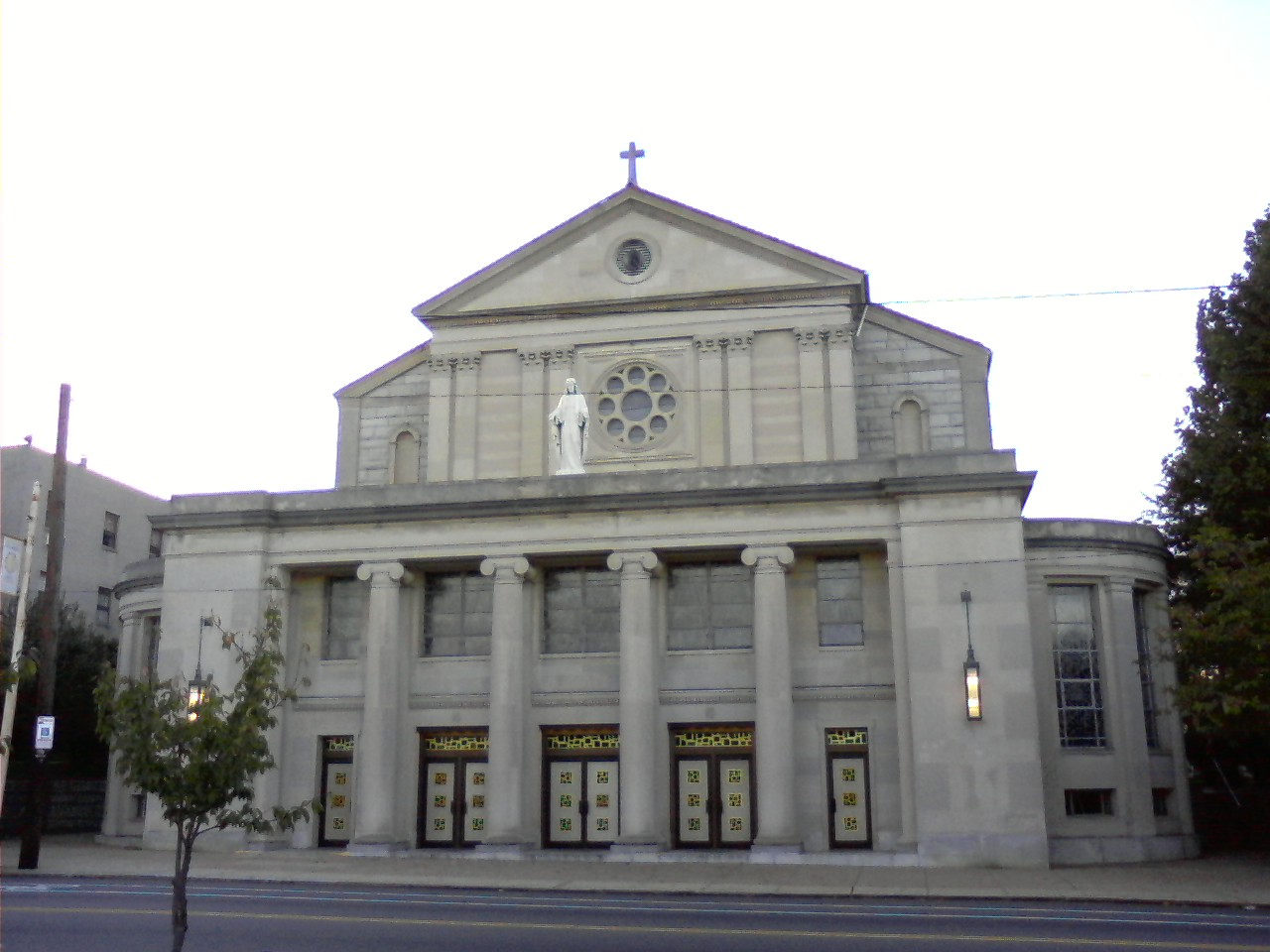
- St. William Parish in Lawncrest

- Location within Philadelphia
- Coordinates: 40°02′42″N 75°06′04″W
- Country: United States
- State: Pennsylvania
- County: Philadelphia
- City: Philadelphia
- Area codes: 215, 267 and 445

Crescentville is a neighborhood in Northeast Philadelphia, United States. It is located in the vicinity of Adams, Rising Sun, and Tabor Avenues. The name Crescentville is thought to be derived from the Crescentville Rope Factory that once stood along the Tookany Creek watershed.

Crescentville is bounded by Tookany Creek to the south and west of Adams Avenue, up to the intersection of Comly and Rising Sun Avenues and to Whitaker Avenue to the east. Originally, the center of the "town" was located on the West side of Tookany/Tacony Creek, where Asylum Road (Adams Ave) crosses the creek. The ZIP Code is 19120 (Olney Postal Station). Its history dates back before the Civil War as an affluent area once home to many mansions and estates, as well as a few farms. Most notably, during the Civil War, the area was referred to as "Grubbtown". Some of the lower portions of Crescentville are sub-categorized and considered the Whitaker Mills area in reference to the Whitaker Mills that stood along Tacony/Tookany Creek at Tabor Road.

== Geography ==
=== Rising Sun Avenue ===
The main artery is Rising Sun Avenue, which was originally a toll road known as the Kensington & Oxford Turnpike. Rising Sun Avenue is home to many stores, shops and homes. Some former stores of note were the former Crest Diner, later Luv-Inn Diner (as of 2018, a seafood restaurant), the Dairy Queen (now a laundromat) Pippo's Italian Restaurant and the Crest Theater.

=== East of Rising Sun ===
The area east of Rising Sun, over to Tabor Road, is mostly row homes, though other east side houses were singles and twins, such as on Godfrey Avenue. Some are built on land formerly housing a swampy area that was more of a nature area for the farming residents of prior days.

It was said that this area had boardwalks and picnic areas for the affluent residents, and even a small one-lane airport was to have been located nearer to present day Comly Street. Ben Franklin Public Elementary School was built at Rising Sun and Cheltenham Avenue during the 1920s and shared its principal at first with the nearby Lawndale Elementary School about a mile away, at Bingham and Hellerman Streets in Lawndale. On Tabor Road is Creighton Elementary School, also public, built in the 1900s. Both schools see a combined enrollment of just under 2000 students.

==== Row houses ====
The area was largely undeveloped until the 1920s, when northward expansion of the city limits took hold and "modern" row housing was built over former farmland. Various developers built blocks and blocks of row homes with little thought or attention to open space. This effect would later have consequences. The average price of a new row home back then was under $5,000—an equivalent to around $76,000 in 2018 dollars.

=== West side of Rising Sun Avenue ===
The west side of Rising Sun Avenue is home to more single and twin homes, though a few blocks of classy stone rows are found. Within one of those blocks of Stone Rows was the home of cartoonist Bil Keane, creator of Family Circus. Keane attended and graduated from nearby St. William Catholic School and later attended Northeast Catholic High School, where he began and honed his drawing skills.

=== Lower end ===
The lower end of Crescentville was home to many industries up until the late 1970s and early 1980s which employed many of the local residents. Included in this mix were Bond Bread, the Electric Battery Storage Company (later ESB, Inc.) makers of Exide battery products, 3M, Goodman Mills and several smaller mills. In 1978, the ESB, Inc. factory was mostly demolished (a few of the original buildings are still standing) to make way for Rising Sun Plaza, a shopping center home to over two dozen stores. When it opened, Clover and Acme Markets were the bookend stores that were the primary draw, but after the closing of Clover and later the Acme Market, the draw has turned to more of the discount stores. There are still a few stores located within that are original stores from when the Plaza opened.

== Churches ==
Crescentville is also home to many small Protestant churches. Crescentville United Methodist is the oldest of these, located on Sentner Street. It was founded in 1920 just as the neighborhood was taking shape. Also located here is the Crescentville Baptist Church, which started out in the 1930s in the basement of the old bank building on the northeastern corner of Rising Sun And Cheltenham Avenues, later moving to a carriage house of the former Tansey estate, and finally to its present location on Godfrey Avenue.

Crescentville has two Catholic churches serving the neighborhood; St. William's Parish, located in Lawncrest, serves the larger majority of the community, while St. Ambrose Parish serves a portion of the lower end below Godfrey Avenue/Allengrove Street. These churches have a combined parish population of over 9,000. St. William School closed in 2012, and their students attend Presentation BVM School or St. Cecilia School, St. Ambrose School closed in 2006 and their students now attend St. Martin of Tours Parish School in Oxford Circle.

Just north of Comly Street is the location of the former Wentz Farm reservoir. This reservoir was used by the City of Philadelphia until the late 1930s, when it was dismantled and the land given over to the Recreation Department. It was built on the property of Wentz Farm, hence the name. When thoughts were given to use of the land, it was decided to build a single recreation center to serve both Crescentville and the neighboring Lawndale Community, hence the name Lawn-Crest came to be. Later, the Free Library of Philadelphia built its Lawn-Crest Branch next door to the Rec. Center. Located on the far NW Corner of this plot of ground is the Engine 64 Firehouse and Police Station building, built in 1924. The police station was closed in the 1960s, and now houses the department of L&I, while Engine 64 still is in daily use.

== Economy ==
Today, the two largest employers in the area are the navy depot and Cardone Industries. Cardone is a parts remanufacturer, primarily in the auto industry. Founded in 1970, it is one of the earliest "green" companies in the world according to a 2008 version of their web site. They have taken over many of the buildings for their use, which were left abandoned by earlier industries in the area. Their primary headquarters is in the former Stokes Vacuum Plant on Tabor Road while their primary factory facility is on Rising Sun Avenue, just below Adams Ave. U.S. Environmental Protection Agency has a different viewpoint of Cardone Industries.

The median home price ranges from $80–90,000 for an East Side Row (there are few if any singles or twins on the East Side), and $125,000 and up for a West Side Stone Front Row, up to $275,000 for a West Side Single.

== National Register of Historic Places ==
The Thomas Creighton School and Benjamin Franklin School are listed on the National Register of Historic Places.
