= Ethan Allen Elementary School =

Ethan Allen Elementary School may refer to:

- Ethan B. Allen Elementary School - Garden Grove Unified School District - Fountain Valley, California
- Ethan Allen School in Philadelphia
