= Mayfair, Philadelphia =

Mayfair
- Neighborhood of Philadelphia
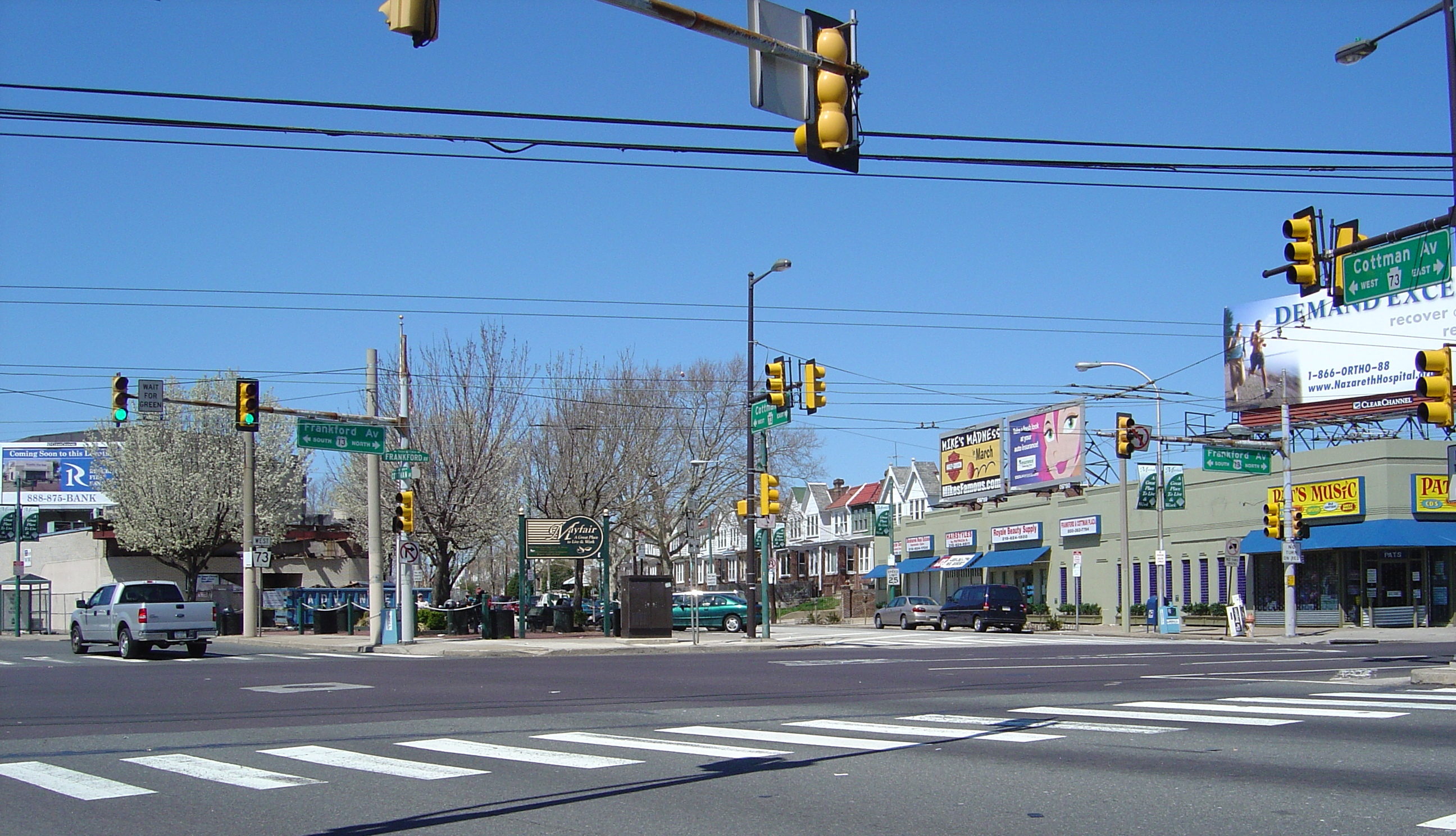
- The intersection of Frankford and Cottman Avenues in Mayfair

- Location within Philadelphia
- Country: United States
- State: Pennsylvania
- County: Philadelphia County
- City: Philadelphia
- Area codes: 215, 267 and 445

Mayfair is a working class neighborhood in lower Northeast Philadelphia, Pennsylvania, United States, centered on the intersection of Cottman and Frankford Avenues. It is bordered by Tacony and Wissinoming to the south and east, Holmesburg to the east, Pennypack Park to the north, and Oxford Circle and Rhawnhurst to the west. Mayfair is historically home to a large Irish American population, but more recently has seen accelerated growth of Asian American, Hispanic, Russian and mid eastern population.

The street borders are the north side of Harbison Avenue to the south. The eastern border is the west side of Frankford Avenue. The east side of Roosevelt Boulevard is the border to the west. It also borders the west side of Frankford Avenue, from Harbison Avenue up to Cottman Avenue but both sides of Frankford Avenue from Cottman Avenue to Sheffield Avenue. It borders on the west side of Rhawn street at the intersection of Frankford and Rhawn. Mayfair borders the Holmesburg neighborhood to the north and east, but the borders between that neighborhood are not clearly defined and often disputed, as are the borders with other surrounding neighborhoods. It is named after the Mayfair district in London.

== History ==
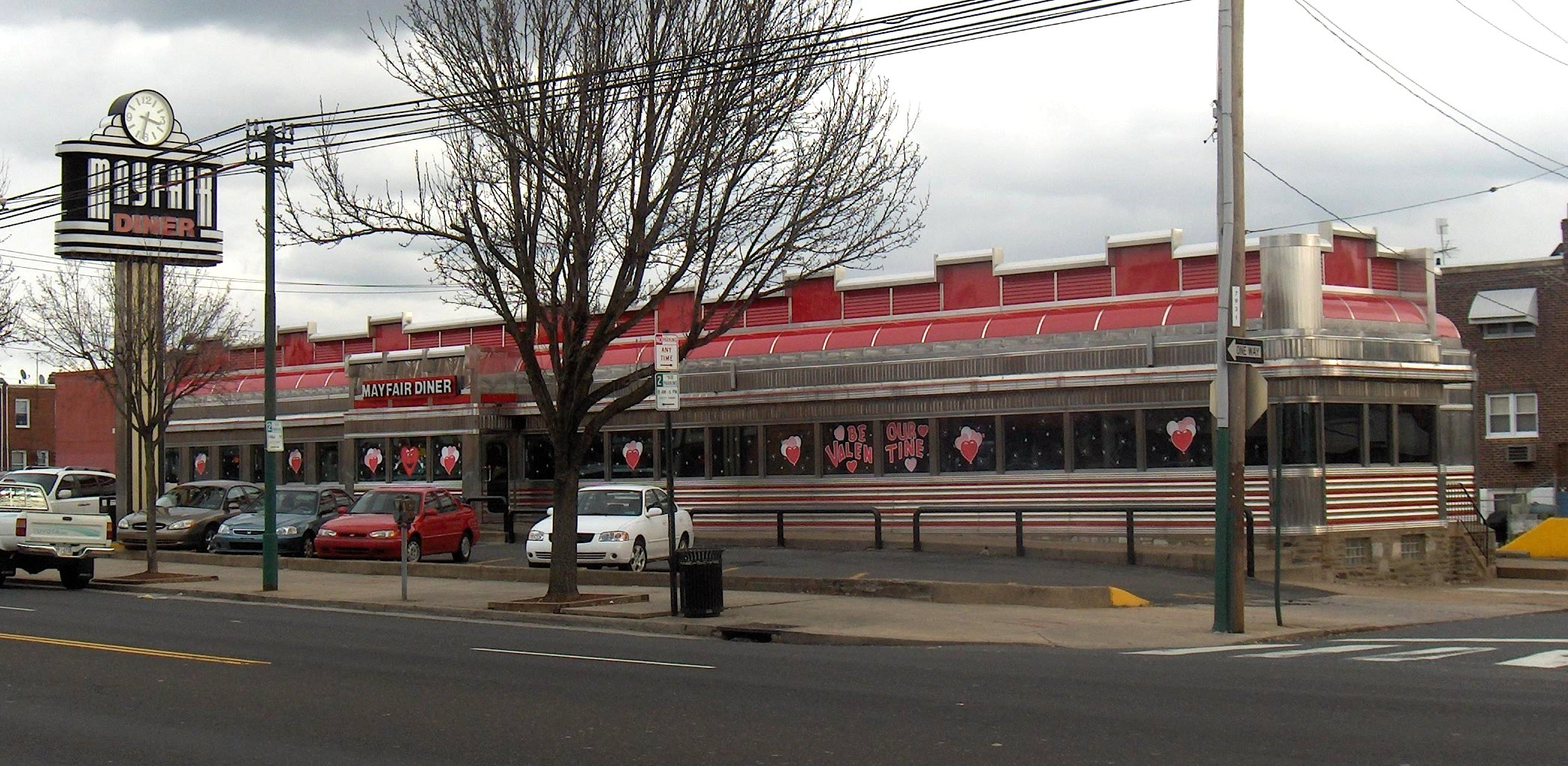
Mayfair Diner

Before development in the 1920s, Mayfair was essentially farmland and home to The Edwin Forrest Home for Children (near present-day Frankford and Shelmire Avenue) and The Oxford and Lower Dublin Poor House (west of present-day Rowland and Sheffield Aves). First established in 1929, Mayfair came to fruition in the years following World War II as a community that provided fresher and more spacious living in an urban environment. It was constructed over farmland surrounded by the established neighborhoods of Tacony, Holmesburg and Fox Chase. Mayfair featured several groundbreaking concepts for city dwellers: bigger rowhouses with parking garages in the back. The automobile became the primary mode of transportation and shopping retail centers became available close to home, as shopping districts developed along Roosevelt Boulevard, Frankford Avenue and Cottman Avenue. Development also served to connect the surrounding neighborhoods of the Northeast that had previously been isolated. Development in Mayfair was a forerunner to American suburbanization, an early part of the population shift from the inner city to its outer regions.

== Education ==
Residents are zoned to the School District of Philadelphia.

The Ethan Allen School and Edwin Forrest School are listed on the National Register of Historic Places. Mayfair Elementary School is also in Mayfair.

Ethan Allen and Mayfair elementary are K-8 schools, while Edwin Forrest-zoned students go onto Austin Meehan Middle. Students zoned to Austin Meehan, Ethan Allen, and Mayfair are also zoned to Abraham Lincoln High School.

Lincoln High was originally scheduled to be named Mayfair High School, but opposition from other neighborhoods meant that the school was instead named after Abraham Lincoln. Mayfair residents had a negative reception to this change. In 1949 the school's cornerstone was laid. Mayfair Elementary School also opened in 1949.

== Population ==
As of the 2010 census, the tracts covering most of Mayfair had a population of 38,202 people, 56% White, 19% African American, 16% Hispanic, 8% Asian, 2% Two or more races, and 2% Other and mostly in owner-occupied rowhouses. Over the last two decades investors have bought up the housing stock to accommodate Section 8 housing turning the neighborhood into a mostly rental population.

Mayfair is widely known for its association with Irish-American culture. During the 2000 census, 14,682 people noted Irish ancestry, including 11,100 who claimed it as their primary ancestry. Other claimed ancestries of note were German (7,069), Italian (6,067), Polish (3,512), and English (2,442). Like most of the city's Northeast, since 2000, the area has seen an increase in immigrants from Russia as well as an increase in non-European immigrants and non-European , with the integration of immigrants from various Asian countries, Arabs, Blacks and Hispanic Americans in the communities. As of 2016, Mayfair experienced a 496% increase in poverty per US census Data.
