= Abraham Lincoln High School (Philadelphia) =

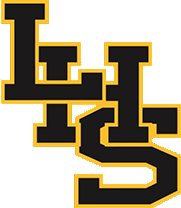

Location
- 3201 Ryan Avenue; Philadelphia, Pennsylvania 19136; United States
- Coordinates: 40.04418°N 75.04191°W

Information
- Type: Public High School
- Motto: With Malice Towards None
- Status: Open
- School district: School District of Philadelphia
- CEEB code: 393205
- Principal: Jack Nelson
- Teaching staff: 163.40 (on an FTE basis)
- Grades: 9–12, with Pre-K Day Care
- Gender: Coeducational
- Enrollment: 2,201 (2023–2024)
- Student to teacher ratio: 13.47
- Hours in school day: 7
- Campus type: Urban
- Color
- Mascot: Abraham Lincoln, The Railsplitter
- Team name: Rail Splitters
- Yearbook: Railsplitter
- Website: lincoln.philasd.org

Abraham Lincoln High School, a public school located in the Mayfair section of Northeast Philadelphia, Pennsylvania. Its main entrance is located at Ryan and Rowland Avenues. The principal is Jack Nelson.

It serves Mayfair, Holmesburg, and Torresdale.

== Overview ==
Abraham Lincoln is widely known as Philadelphia's "All-Academy" high school. Students can choose from a variety of academies, including law, business, environmental science, health, and fine and performing arts.

Lincoln offers an academy for students who speak a language other than traditional American English, including a program for the deaf and hard-of-hearing.

Students may choose from sports such as football, soccer, cheerleading, track, baseball, volleyball, tennis, badminton, golf, swimming, softball, bowling and wrestling. The school has a band and a choir, both of which perform a Christmas concert and a spring musical annually, in addition to performances for the local community, and city.

The school is also staffed with Non-Teaching Assistants ("NTA's") and a school police group supplemented by the Philadelphia Police Department to ensure that all students are provided a safe school environment.

== History ==
Lincoln was originally scheduled to be named Mayfair High School, but opposition from other neighborhoods, including Holmesburg, meant that the school was instead named after Abraham Lincoln. Mayfair residents had a negative reception to this change. In 1949 the school's cornerstone was laid. Its current campus opened in 2009.

The current building has a capacity of 1,586. In 2024 there were over 2,000 students.

== School uniforms ==
Students wear school uniforms. Students wear a gold, white or black polo shirt and any sort of black pants.

== Campus ==
In 2024, the school library was shut down and converted into six classrooms; the classrooms were formed to accommodate students. The library books were sent off to a company for destruction.

== Popular culture ==
Lincoln's Marching Band was featured in '"Rocky III"' in a scene in which he was honored in front of the Philadelphia Museum of Art; this is the scene where the still-iconic Rocky Balboa statue was first unveiled. A scene for Rocky II was filmed in the Lincoln High School auditorium, but the scene was not used in the film. In the cut scene, Rocky Balboa was awarded an honorary high school diploma. Like his fictional character, Sylvester Stallone attended Lincoln but did not graduate, due to his boxing career, though his brother Frank did.

== Feeder patterns ==
Feeder middle schools and K-8 schools into Lincoln:

- Ethan Allen School
- Hamilton Disston School
- Mayfair School
- Austin Meehan Middle School

Feeder elementary schools:

- Joseph H. Brown Elementary School
- T. Holme Elementary School
- E. Forrest Elementary School
- R. B. Pollock Elementary School
- W. H. Ziegler Elementary School

== Alumni ==
- Glenn Brenner, Washington, D.C., sportscaster
- Larry Cannon, former professional basketball player
- Gia Carangi, supermodel
- George H. Heilmeier, engineer who was contributor to the invention of LCDs
- Ed Neilson, Pennsylvania State Representative
- Jerry Reitman, author, businessman, and advertising executive
- Frank Stallone, actor and younger brother of Sylvester Stallone
- Sylvester Stallone, actor
- Mark Margolis, actor

Bill Boggs, writer and TV personality
