= Pennypack, Philadelphia =

Pennypack
- Neighborhood of Philadelphia
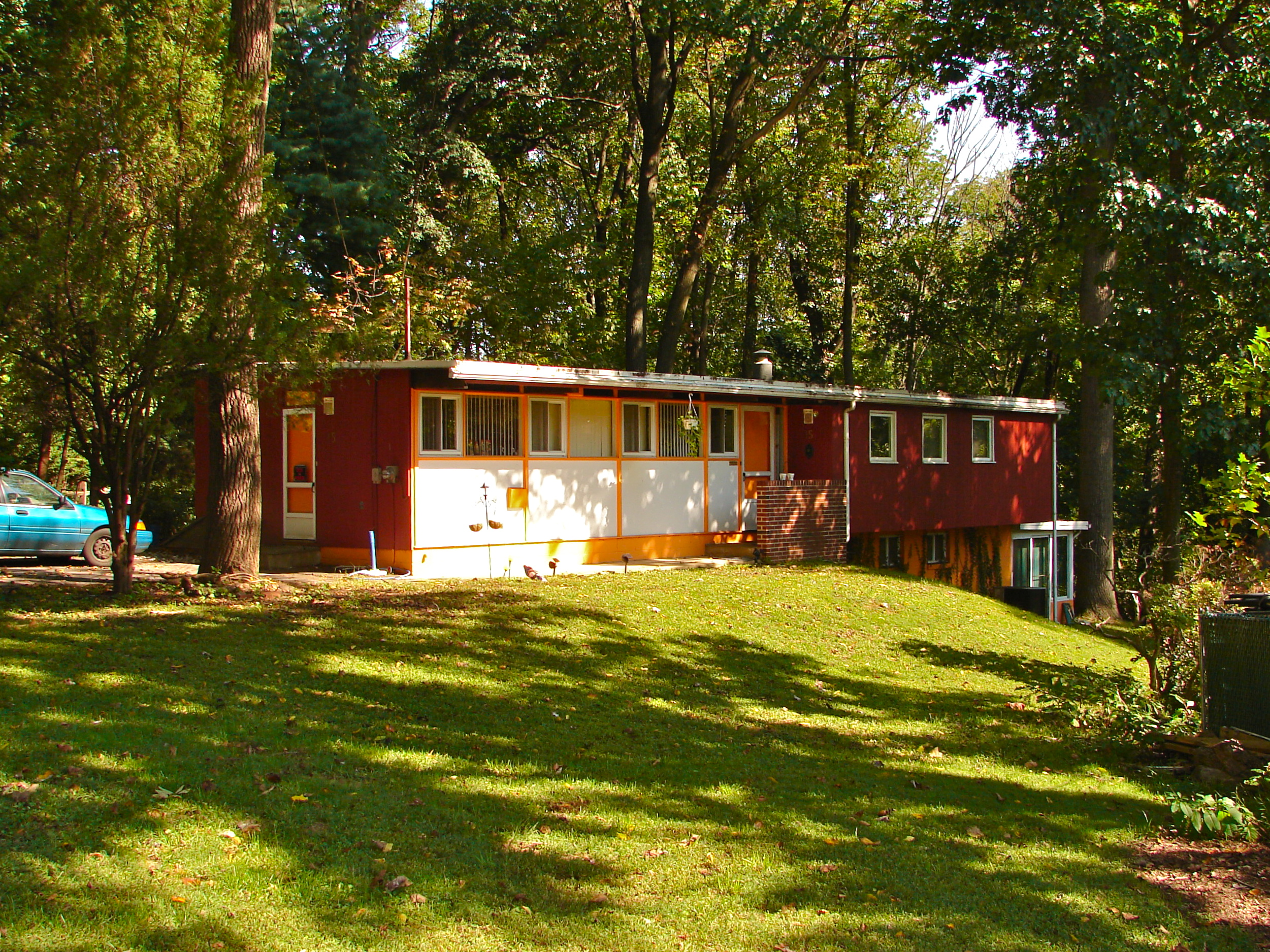
- House in Greenbelt Knoll, in Pennypack

- Location within Philadelphia
- Country: United States
- State: Pennsylvania
- County: Philadelphia County
- City: Philadelphia
- Area codes: 215, 267 and 445

Pennypack is a neighborhood in Northeast Philadelphia, United States. It is located between Northeast Philadelphia Airport and Pennypack Park. The neighborhood's name originates from the Lenape word "penepekw", meaning “deep water”.

The Greenbelt Knoll Historic District and Holme Avenue Bridge are listed on the National Register of Historic Places.
