= Mary Disston School =

- U.S. National Register of Historic Places
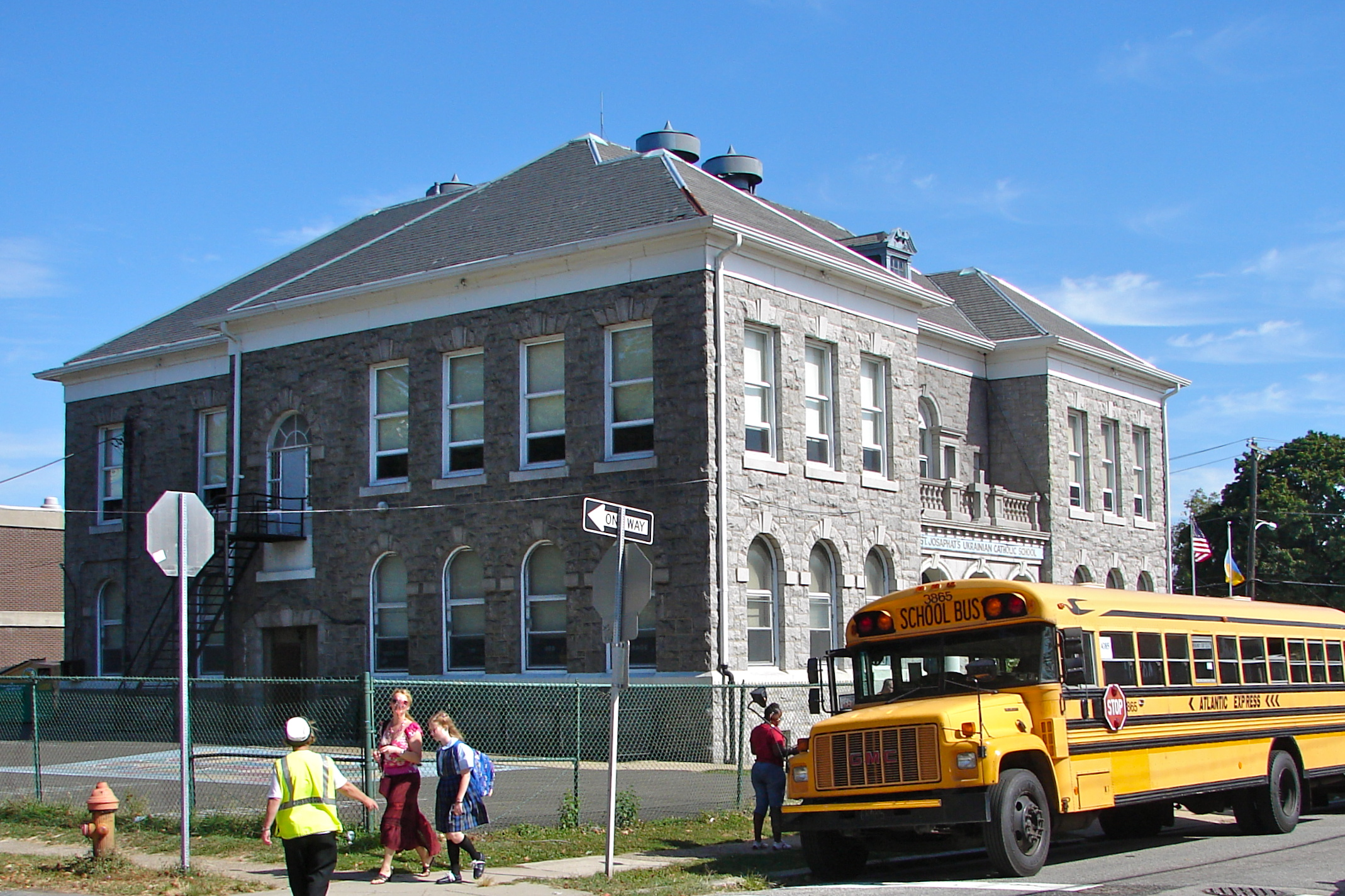
- Mary Disston School, September 2010

- Location within Philadelphia Location within Pennsylvania Location within the United States
- Location: 4521 Longshore Ave., Philadelphia, Pennsylvania
- Coordinates: 40°01′39″N 75°02′38″W
- Area: 2.8 acres (1.1 ha)
- Built: 1900–1901, 1967
- Built by: Harry Kuemmerle
- Architect: Andrew Sauer
- Architectural style: Colonial Revival
- MPS: Philadelphia Public Schools TR
- NRHP reference No.: 88002319
- Added to NRHP: November 18, 1988

Mary Disston School is a historic school building located in the Tacony neighborhood of Philadelphia, Pennsylvania. It was built in 1900–1901, and is a two-story, three-bay, U-shaped stone building in the Colonial Revival style. A rear addition was built in 1967. It features a recessed central entrance with columnaded porch, arched openings, and a balcony; a central Palladian window; and hipped roof.

It was added to the National Register of Historic Places in 1988. For a time the building was home to St. Josaphat's Ukrainian Catholic Church.

== Gallery ==
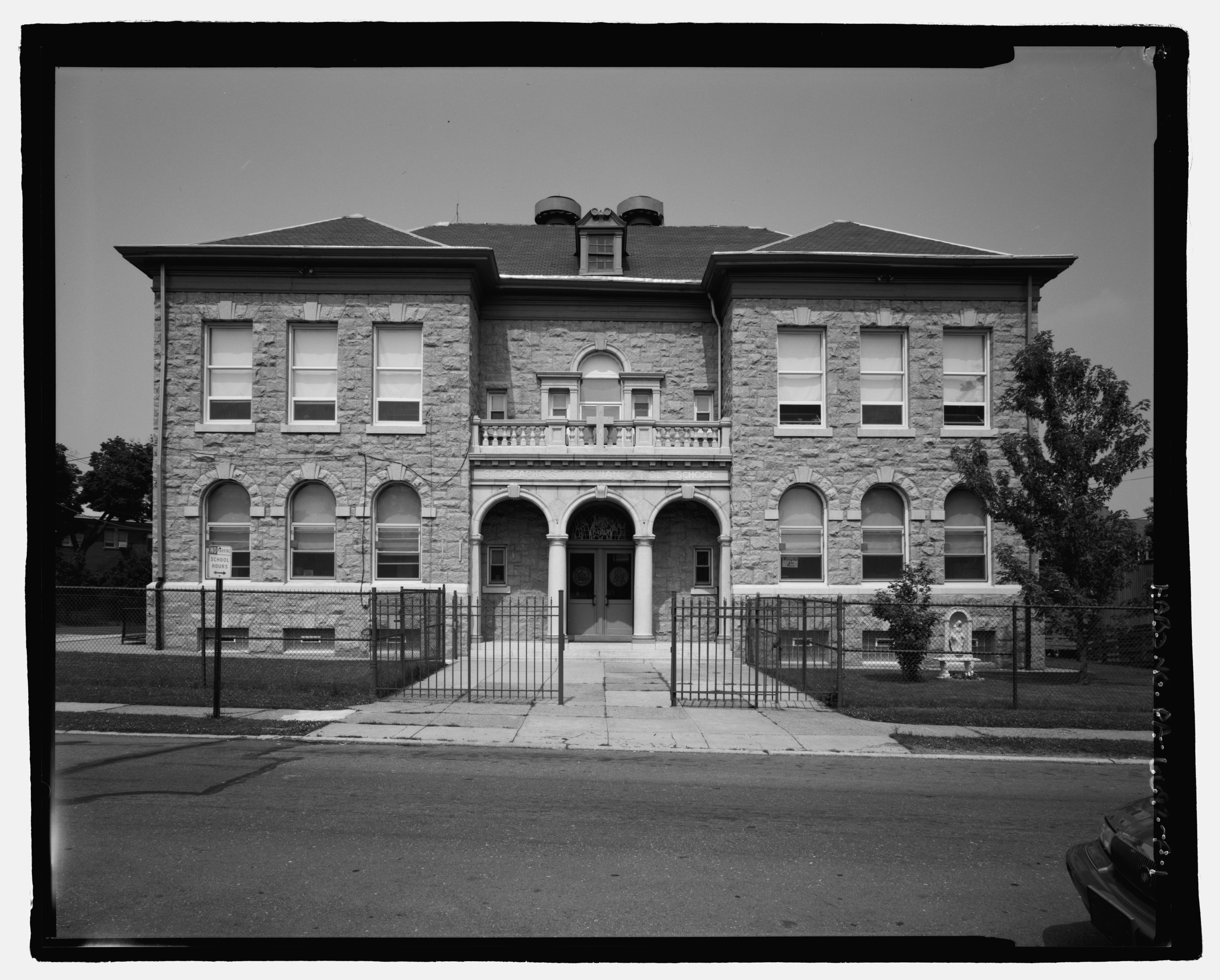

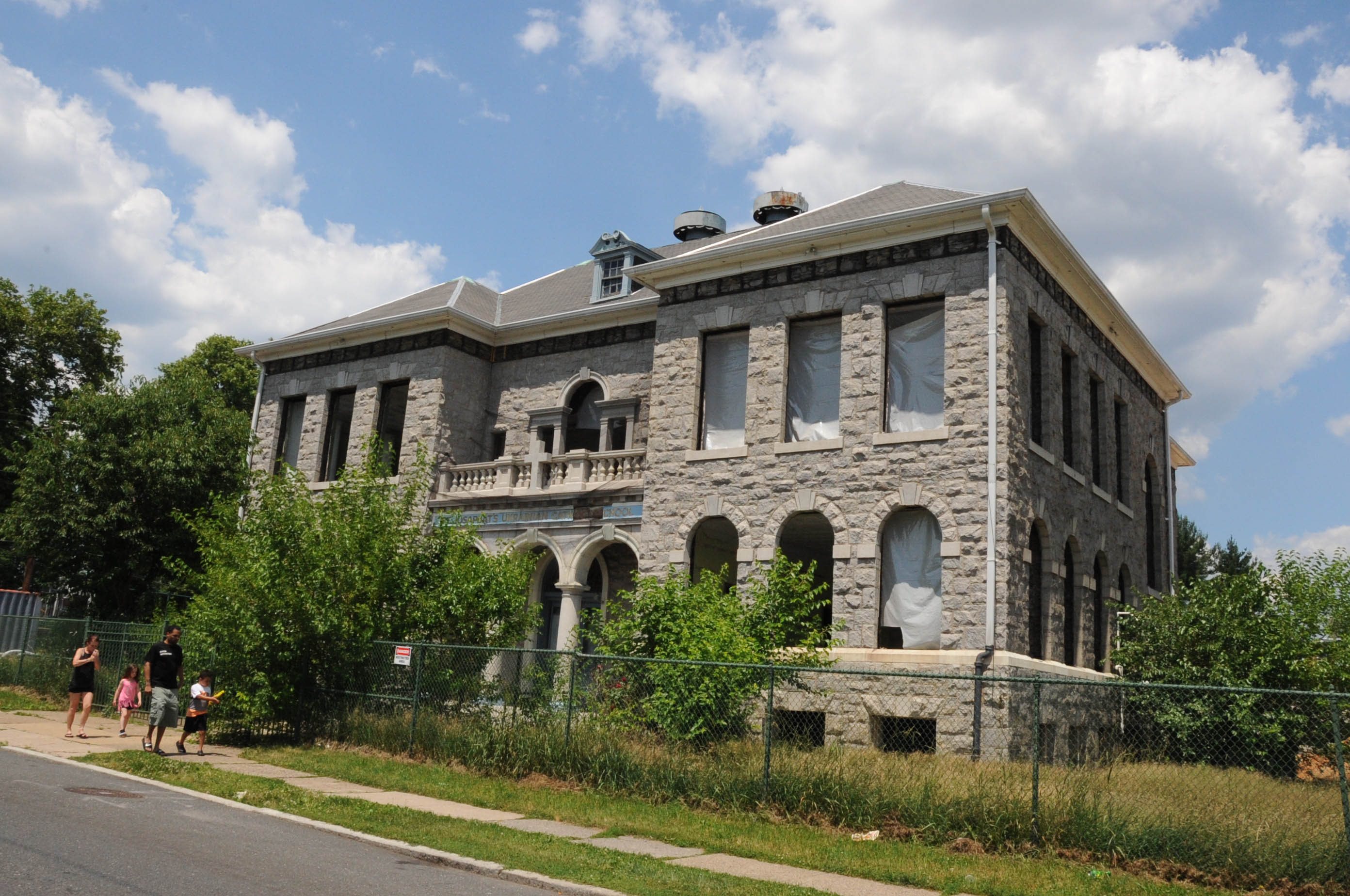
School in 2016
