= William Brown Company Hosiery Mill =

Former mill in Philadelphia

- U.S. National Register of Historic Places
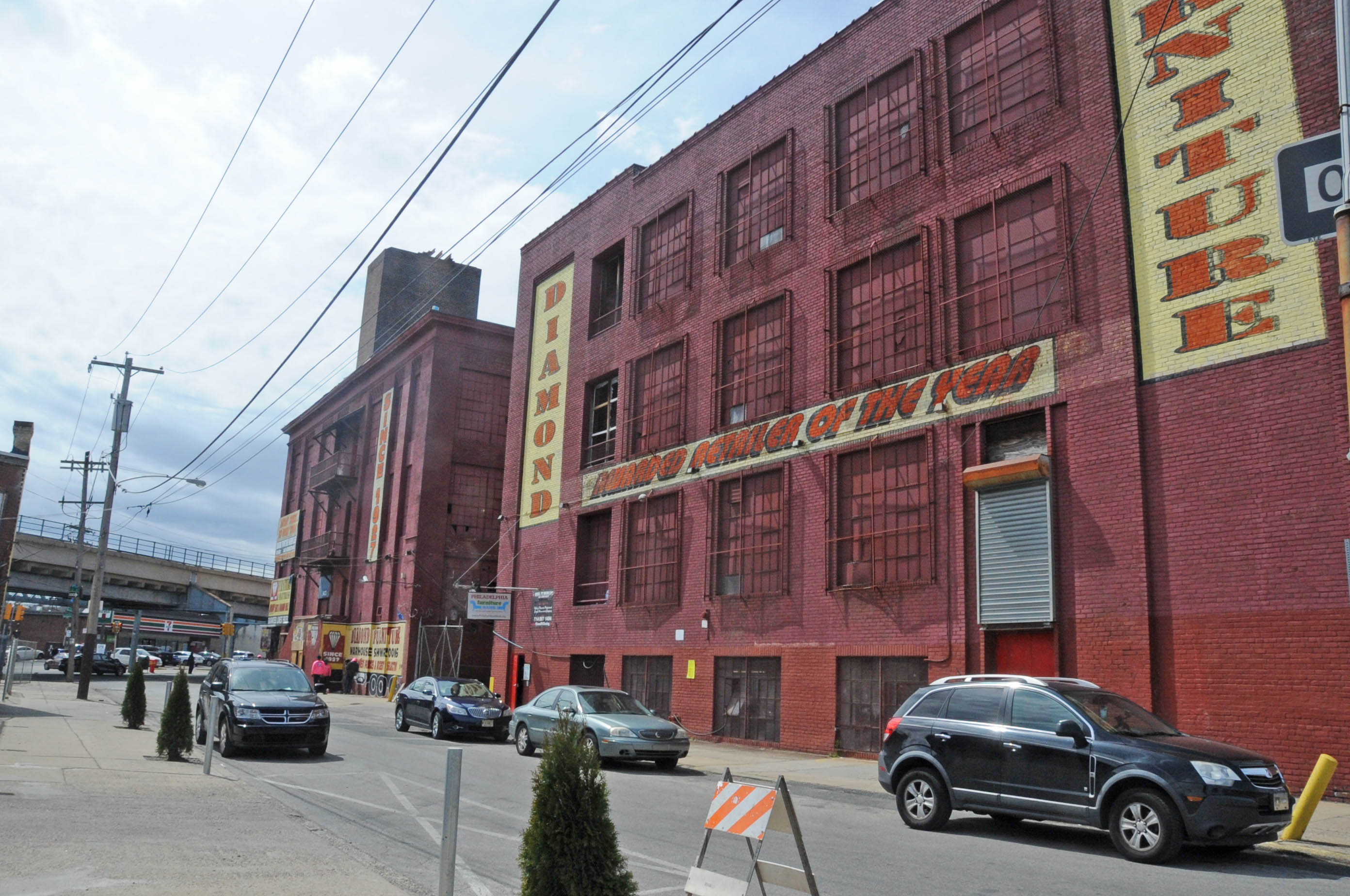
- The building's exterior in 2019
- Interactive map of William Brown Company Hosiery Mill
- Location: Philadelphia, Pennsylvania, United States
- Coordinates: 39°59′58″N 75°6′33″W
- Architect: William Steele and Sons Company
- NRHP reference No.: 100003320
- Added to NRHP: January 17, 2019

The William Brown Company Hosiery Mill, located at 3400-3412 J Street in Philadelphia, Pennsylvania, was added to the National Register of Historic Places on January 17, 2019.

It is no longer in use as an industrial building, and was converted in the 2020 at a cost of nearly $25,000,000 into a mixed-use residential complex. The government granted a $250,000 tax credit for the project.
