= Delaware Generating Station =

- The Delaware Station of the Philadelphia Electric Company
- U.S. National Register of Historic Places
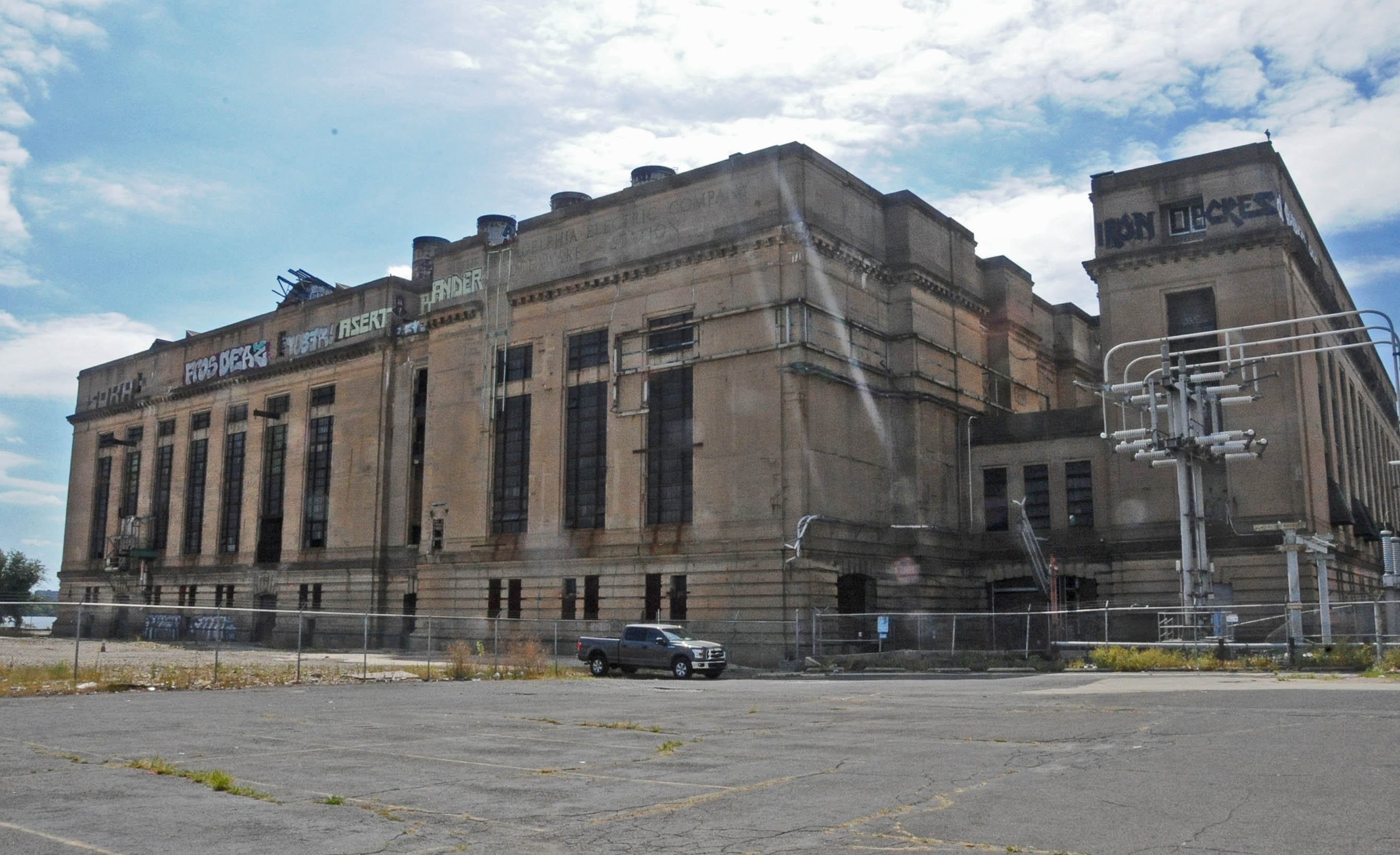
- Delaware Station in 2016

- Location within Philadelphia Location within Pennsylvania Location within the United States
- Location: 1325 Beach Street., Philadelphia, Pennsylvania
- Coordinates: 39°58′3″N 75°7′40″W
- Area: 5.5 acres (2.2 ha)
- Built: 1923
- Architect: John T. Windrim
- NRHP reference No.: 16000427
- Added to NRHP: August 10, 2016

The Delaware Station of the Philadelphia Electric Company, also known as the Delaware Generating Station or Delaware Station, is a historic coal-fired power station on the Delaware River in the Fishtown neighborhood of Philadelphia, Pennsylvania. Built between 1917 and 1923 for the Philadelphia Electric Company (PECO), it was designed by architect John T. Windrim and engineer William C. L. Eglin. The station was Philadelphia's largest power station during the post-World War I period and was added to the National Register of Historic Places in 2016.

== History ==
=== Background ===
By the early twentieth century, rapidly increasing demand for electricity from Philadelphia's industries, businesses, and growing residential population exceeded the capacity of PECO's existing generating stations. The company responded by constructing a series of large central generating plants, of which the Delaware Generating Station was the third major facility. The station occupied a waterfront site along the Delaware River that provided convenient access to rail transportation, barge deliveries of coal, and large volumes of cooling water required for steam-electric generation.

=== Construction ===
Construction of Delaware Station began in 1917 and was completed in 1923 in two phases. The plant was designed as a permanent generating station capable of future expansion rather than as a stand-alone facility.

=== Operation ===
In 2008, Delaware Generating Station ceased operations as a power plant and the property was sold in 2015.

== Architecture and design ==
Delaware Station was designed in the Beaux Arts style with classical revival detailing despite its industrial function. Windrim and Eglin had initially designed the station to be constructed out of steel; however, due to post-World War I manufacturing shortages, reinforced concrete was used instead.
