= Thomas Creighton School =

- U.S. National Register of Historic Places
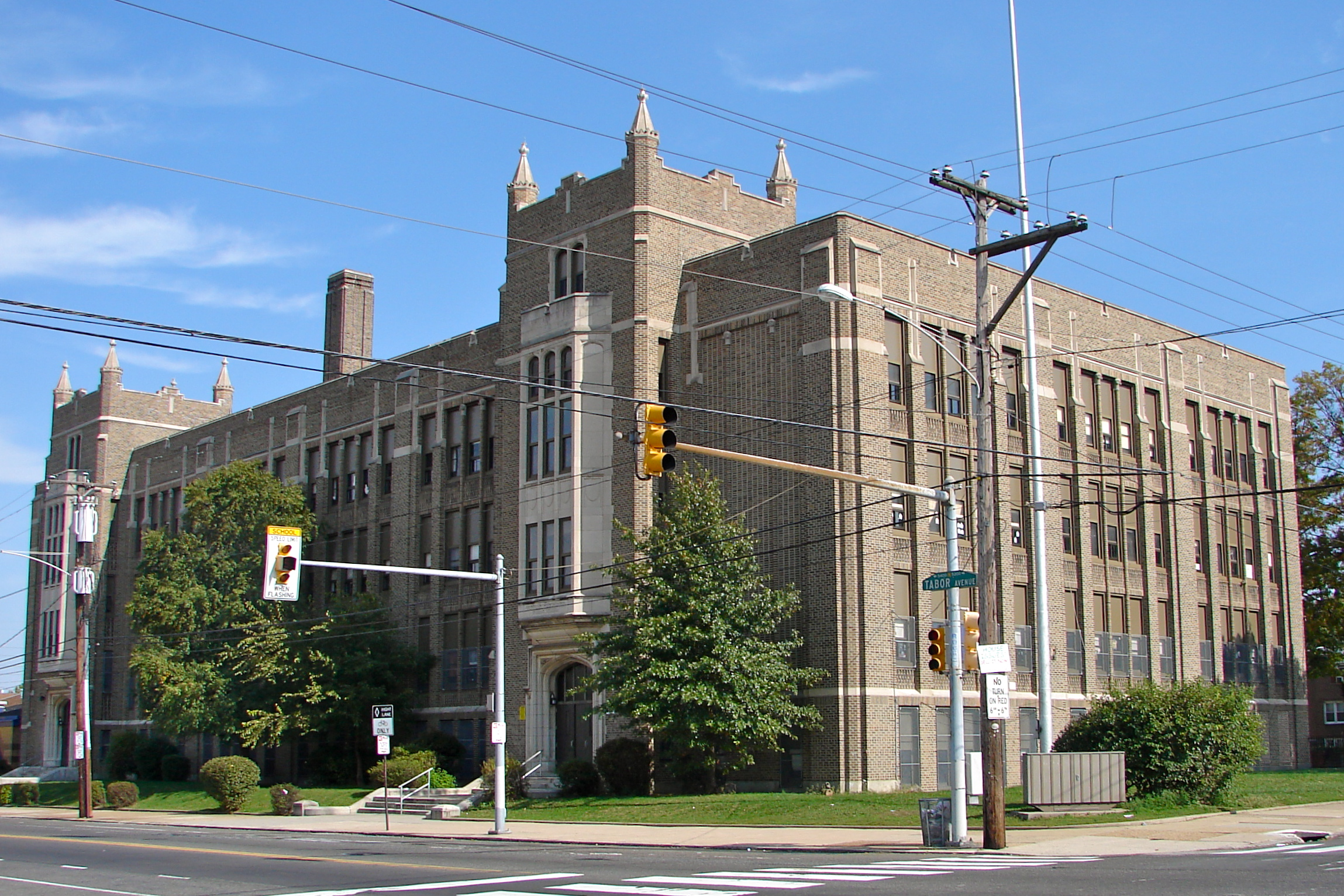
- Thomas Creighton School, October 2010

- Location within Philadelphia Location within Pennsylvania Location within the United States
- Location: 5401 Tabor Rd., Philadelphia, Pennsylvania, United States
- Coordinates: 40.03491°N 75.10476°W
- Area: 2.2 acres (0.89 ha)
- Built: 1929–1930
- Architect: Irwin T. Catharine
- Architectural style: Late Gothic Revival
- MPS: Philadelphia Public Schools TR
- NRHP reference No.: 88002260
- Added to NRHP: November 18, 1988

The Universal Creighton Charter School is a historic school that is located in the Crescentville neighborhood of Philadelphia, Pennsylvania, United States.

Currently in use as a charter school, this building was added to the National Register of Historic Places in 1988 as the Thomas Creighton School.

== History and architectural features ==
This historic building was designed by Irwin T. Catharine and built between 1929 and 1930. It is a three-story, eight-bay, brick building that sits on a raised basement. Created in the Late Gothic Revival style, it features entrances with arched stone surrounds, brick piers with terra cotta capitals, and a crenellated battlement with four small towers. Additions were built in 1931 and 1954.

The building was added to the National Register of Historic Places in 1988 as the Thomas Creighton School.
