= Cedar Grove Christian Academy =

- Lawndale School
- U.S. National Register of Historic Places
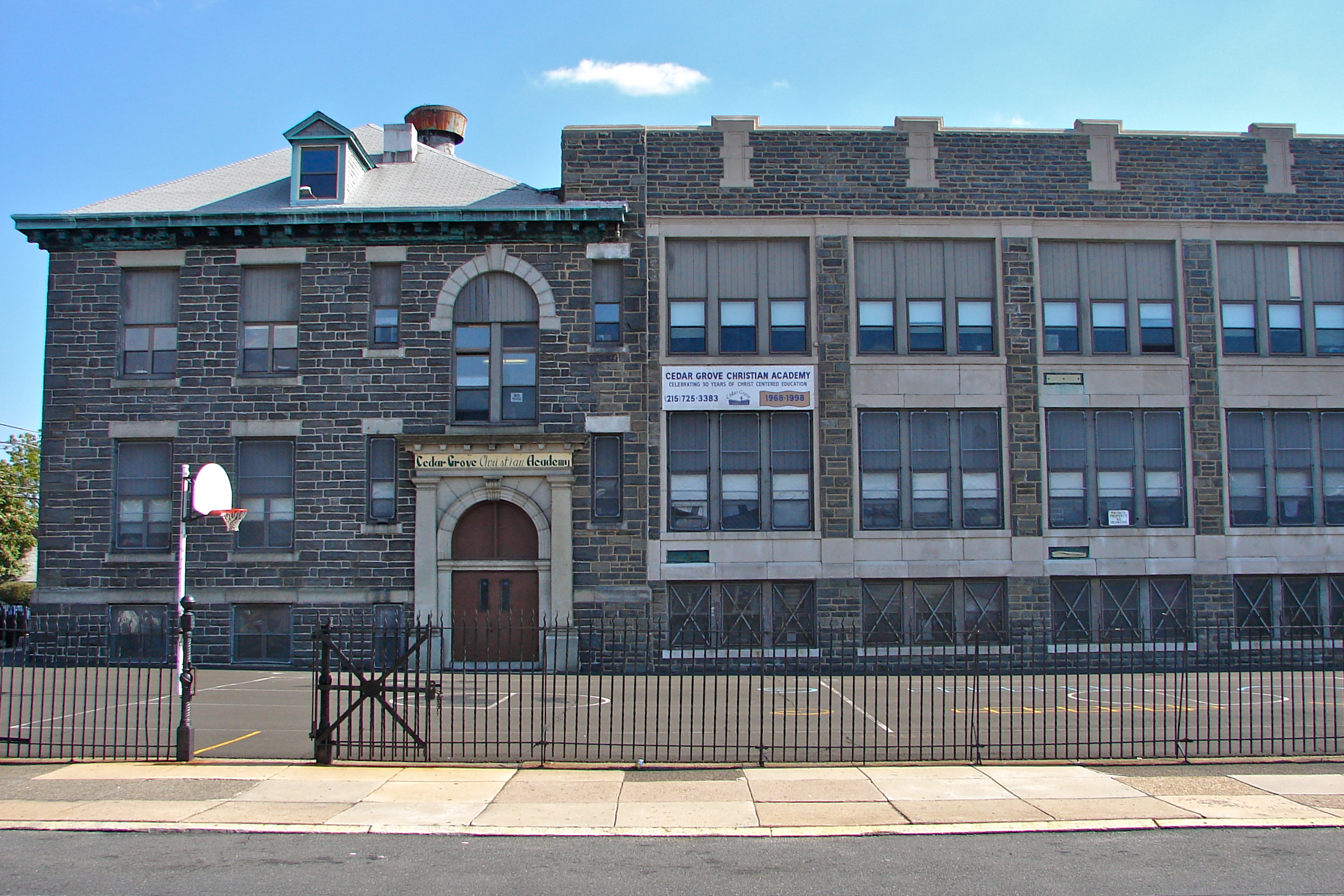
- Lawndale School, October 2010

- Location within Philadelphia Location within Pennsylvania Location within the United States
- Location: 6445 Bingham St., Philadelphia, Pennsylvania
- Coordinates: 40°02′59″N 75°05′31″W
- Area: 2.2 acres (0.89 ha)
- Built: 1903–1904
- Built by: Charles O'Neill
- Architect: James Gaw, Irwin T. Catharine
- Architectural style: Colonial Revival
- MPS: Philadelphia Public Schools TR
- NRHP reference No.: 88002254
- Added to NRHP: November 18, 1988

Cedar Grove Christian Academy is a private Christian school located in the Lawndale neighborhood of Philadelphia, Pennsylvania. It is located in the former Lawndale School building. The school was built in 1903–1904, and is a two-story, three-bay, stone-faced brick building in the Colonial Revival style. Two two-story wings designed by Irwin T. Catharine were added in the 1920s. It features heavy stone sills and lintels and a crenellated parapet.

The building was added to the National Register of Historic Places in 1988.
