= Laura H. Carnell School =

- U.S. National Register of Historic Places
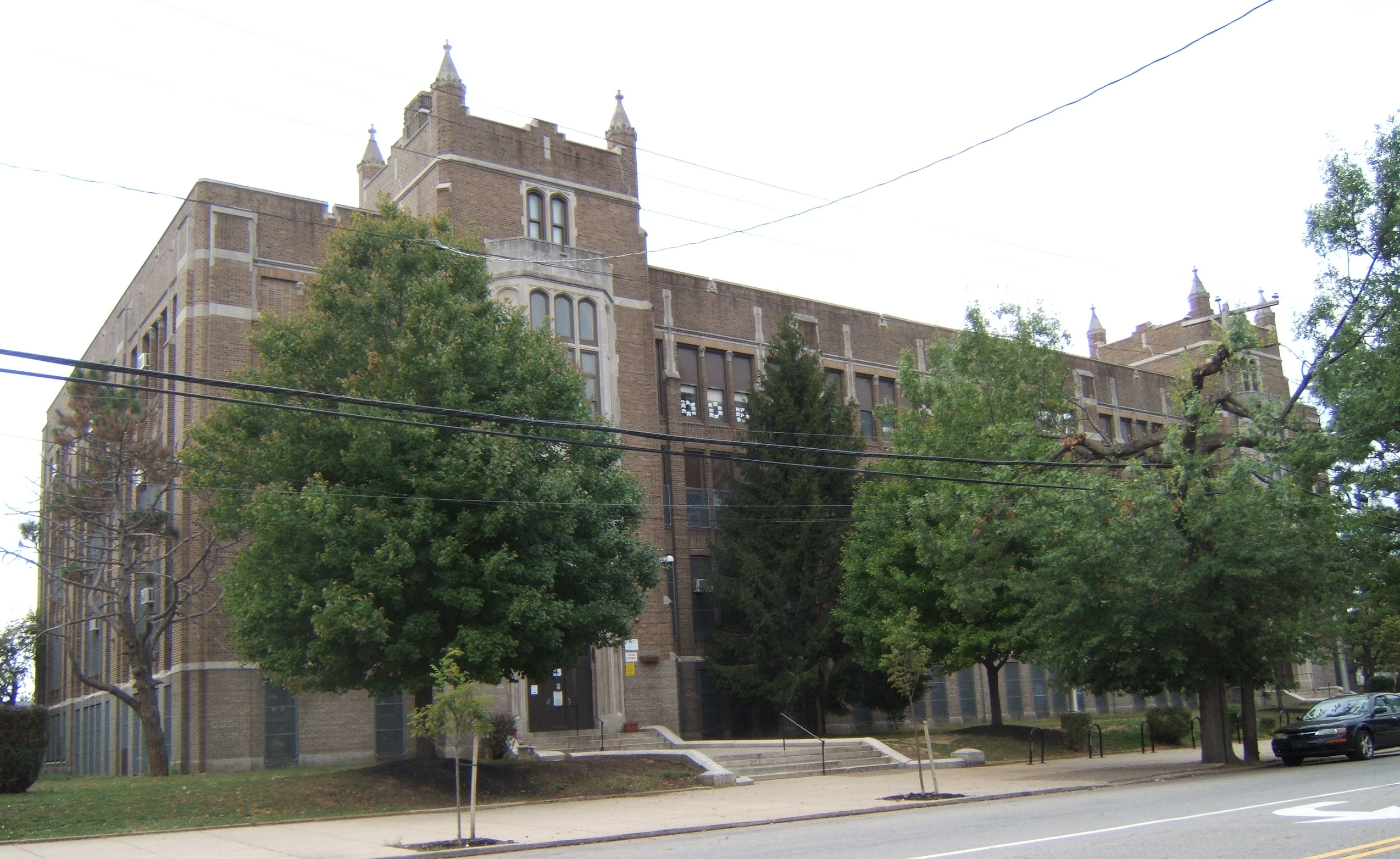
- Laura H. Carnell School, September 2010

- Location within Philadelphia Location within Pennsylvania Location within the United States
- Location: 1100 Devereaux Ave., Philadelphia, Pennsylvania, United States
- Coordinates: 40°02′20″N 75°05′02″W
- Area: 4.5 acres (1.8 ha)
- Built: 1930–1931
- Architect: Irwin T. Catharine
- Architectural style: Late Gothic Revival
- MPS: Philadelphia Public Schools TR
- NRHP reference No.: 88002251
- Added to NRHP: November 18, 1988

The Laura H. Carnell School is a historic elementary school located in the Oxford Circle neighborhood of Philadelphia, Pennsylvania, United States at 1100 Devereaux Avenue. It is part of the School District of Philadelphia.

Named after Temple University dean Laura H. Carnell, this building was added to the National Register of Historic Places in 1988.

== History and architectural features ==
This historic structure was designed by Irwin T. Catharine and was built between 1930 and 1931. It is a three-story, eight-bay, brick building that sits on a raised basement, and was created in the Late Gothic Revival style. A rear addition was built in 1953. It features stone arched entryways, stone two-story bay, and crenellated battlement with four small towers.

This school was named after Temple University dean Laura H. Carnell and was added to the National Register of Historic Places in 1988.
