= Albion Carpet Mill =

Building in Philadelphia, United States

- U.S. National Register of Historic Places
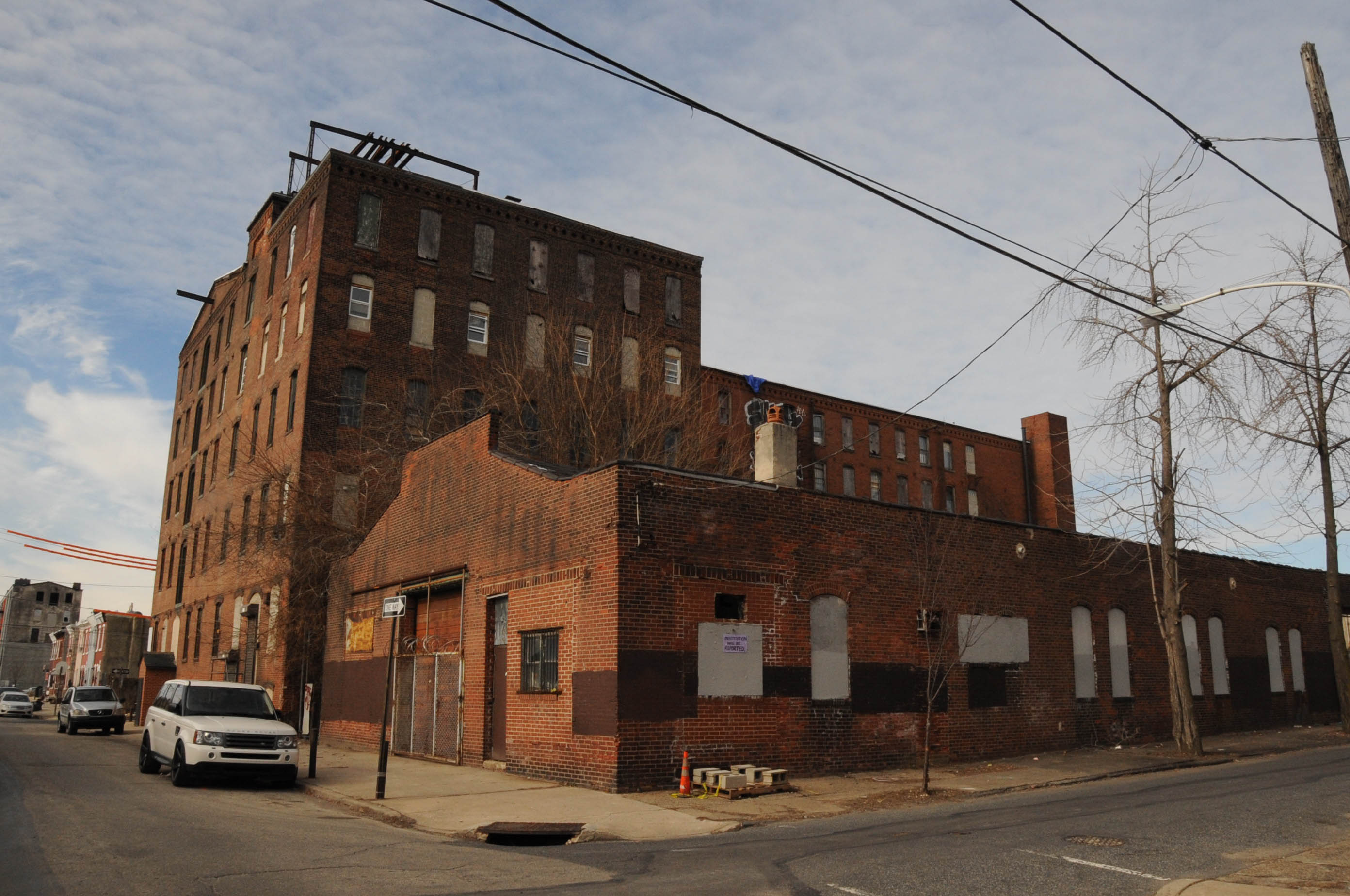
- Albion Carpet Mill

- Location within Pennsylvania Location within the United States
- Location: 1821-1845 E. Hagert St. (Northwest corner of Adams Ave. and E. Hagert St.), Philadelphia, Pennsylvania
- Coordinates: 39°59′10″N 75°7′48″W
- Area: 0.3 acres (0.12 ha)?
- Built: c. 1882
- NRHP reference No.: 15000973
- Added to NRHP: January 12, 2016

The Albion Carpet Mill, also known as the Bromley Mills, is a former mill in Philadelphia, Pennsylvania, United States, for producing ingrain and damask carpet.

== History ==
Various members of the Bromley family were associated with Philadelphia's carpet industry. By 1882, James A. and George D. Bromley were producing the more common ingrain and damask carpets at their Albion Carpet Mill on the northwest corner of East Hagert and Jasper Streets. The firm had 350 employees at 140 looms.

By the 20th century, the mill was no longer active and was used by Wimsel, an ornament manufacturing company. By the 2000s, a tropical fish business operated there.

== Description ==
It is a six-story brick building with a decorated and corbelled brick cornice and arched window openings still stands. Adjoining the east side of the mill on the corner sits a one-story warehouse.

== Sources ==
- Blodget, Lorin. “The Wool Manufacture of Philadelphia,” National Association of Wool Manufacturers Bulletin, 10:1(1880).
