= Oxford Circle, Philadelphia =

Oxford Circle
- Neighborhood of Philadelphia
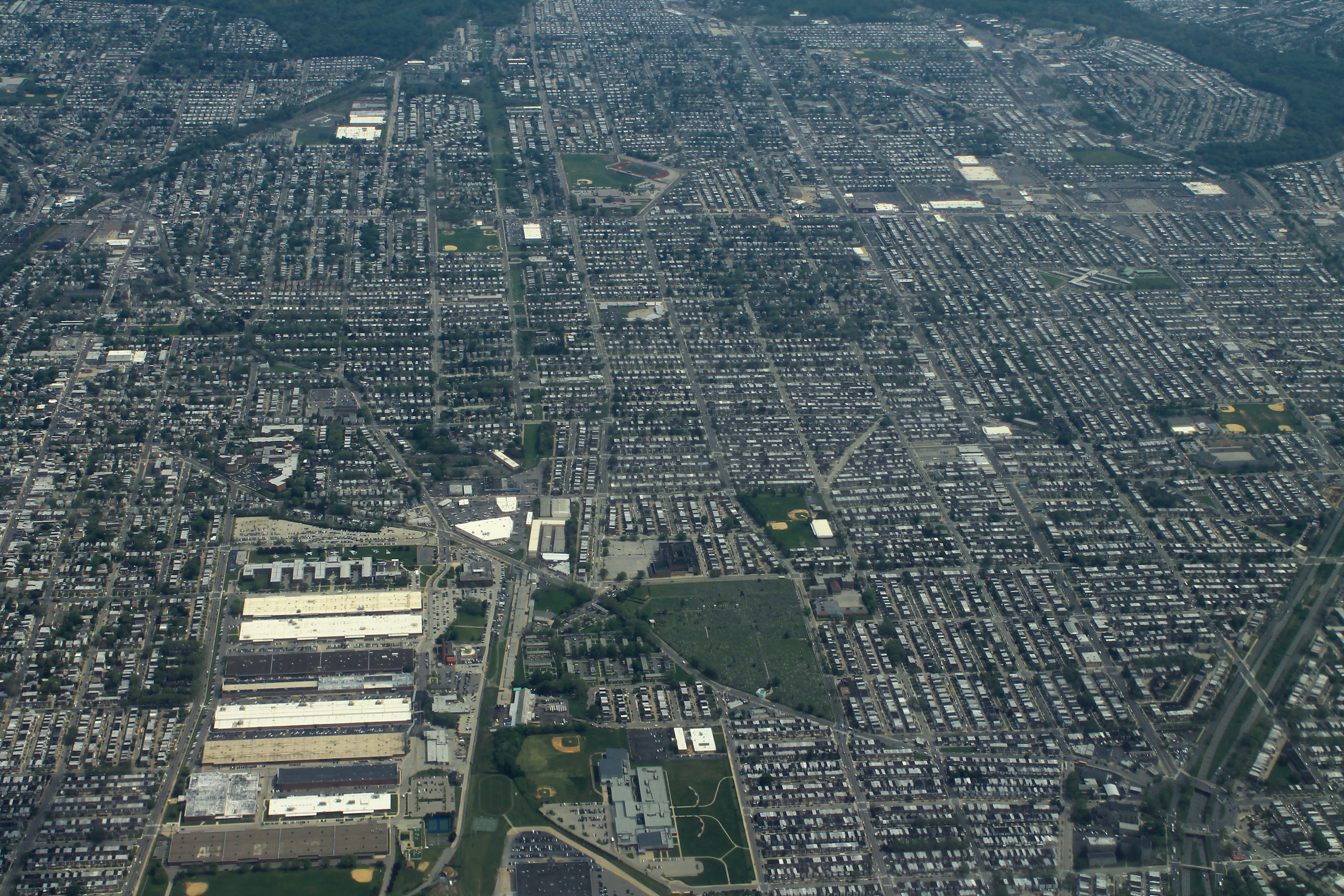
- Aerial view of Oxford Circle

- Location within Philadelphia
- Country: United States
- State: Pennsylvania
- County: Philadelphia County
- City: Philadelphia
- Area codes: 215, 267, and 445

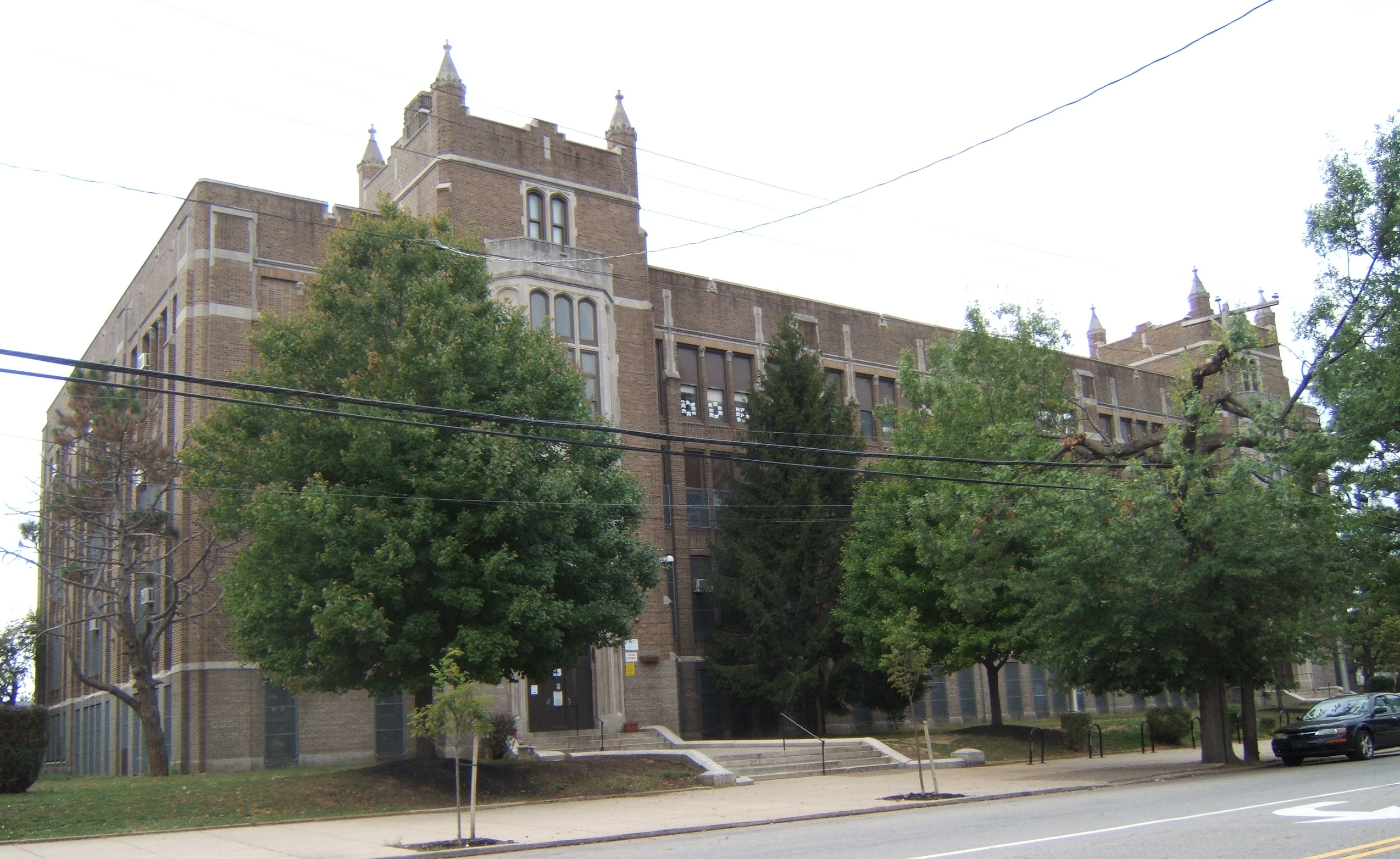
Laura H. Carnell School in Oxford Circle, September 2010

Oxford Circle is a neighborhood in the lower Northeast section of Philadelphia, Pennsylvania, United States. Its namesake is the much used traffic circle at Roosevelt Boulevard and Oxford Avenue. The Oxford Circle neighborhood has traditionally included the areas up to Rhawnhurst and Mayfair but does not have fixed boundaries, other than in publications about Philadelphia which are of public relations or informational natures.

Oxford Circle is also the colloquial name for the nearby Summerdale neighborhood, which is located west of Roosevelt Boulevard, opposite the city's Frankford section. However, Summerdale is, for the most part, a different neighborhood than the one that is discussed in this article.

== Geography/topography ==
Physical boundaries are: Roosevelt Boulevard on the southeast, Oxford Avenue on the west, Devereaux Avenue on the northeast, and Cheltenham Avenue to the south. Oxford Circle's boundaries (including Castor Gardens) seem to have a general basis in the course of three creeks which were part of the landscape long before the development of the neighborhood. Most of Oxford Circle lies between these creeks. To the northwest was the Wissinoming Creek running from above Castor Avenue along Tyson Avenue and on towards Mayfair. To the east is the Pennypack Creek and to the southeast is the Tacony Creek (which is called "Tookany" north of the city and flows into Frankford Creek). As late as 1928, a branch of the Tacony called the Little Tacony Creek still flowed from Castor Avenue past Levick Street and Large Street and on to Roosevelt Boulevard. This Little Tacony Creek connected into the main Tacony Creek which flows into the Delaware River near the site of today's Betsy Ross Bridge.

== History ==
Oxford Circle, along with Castor Gardens, Mayfair, and Tacony, was originally part of Oxford Township and was one of the early suburbs of Philadelphia. The area, which included waterways such as the Tacony Creek and Wissinoming Creek, had been mostly utilized for farming up until the time that the land was sold off to developers just prior to World War II. Most of the brick and stone row houses which characterize this neighborhood today were built by the Hyman Korman Company starting in the early 1940s and continuing into the 1950s. During that time and in the 1960s and 1970s Oxford Circle was a relatively prosperous white middle-class neighborhood (see White flight).

Rising crime rates have dramatically changed the neighborhood since the late 1990s to early 2000s. Today's Oxford Circle is inhabited by a diverse population, including Caucasian, Jewish, Koreans, Hispanics (mostly Puerto Ricans, Dominicans, and Brazilians), West Indians (mostly Haitians), and African Americans. Oxford Circle is about 31% Black, 25% White, 32% Hispanic, and 11% Asian.

The Laura H. Carnell School, named for educator Laura H. Carnell, was added to the National Register of Historic Places in 1988.

== Demographics ==
According to the US Census of 2000 for the area of 19149. The demographics are as follows.

General characteristics	Number	Percent	U.S.
Total population	48,483
Male	22,732	46.9	49.10%
Female	25,751	53.1	50.90%
Median age (years)	35.7	(X)	35.3
Under 5 years	3,336	6.9	6.80%
18 years and over	36,005	74.3	74.30%
65 years and over	8,118	16.7	12.40%

Source: U.S. Census Bureau, Summary File 1 (SF 1) and Summary File 3 (SF 3)

== Government ==
Oxford Circle is now predominantly represented in the state house by Jared Solomon. Others who represent parts of it in the legislature are Kevin Boyle and James Clay. In the state senate, it is represented by Christine Tartaglione and John P. Sabatina Jr. Its city council members are Cherelle Parker, Bobby Henon and Maria Quinones-Sanchez.

== Structures and landmarks ==
- Old Trinity Church
- Tarken Playground
- Max Myers Playground
- Northeast High School
- Spruance, Carnell, Solis-Cohen, and Moore Elementary Schools
- Fels Senior High School
- Castor Ave. (shopping district)
- Bushrod Library
- Oxford Circle (traffic circle) 40°01′53″N 75°05′04″W
- Saint Martin of Tours Roman Catholic Church

== Public libraries ==
Free Library of Philadelphia operates the Bushrod Branch at 6304 Castor Avenue at Stirling Street.
