= Laura H. Carnell =

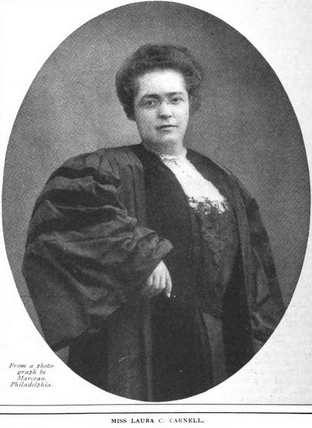
Laura Carnell in her academic robes, from a 1908 publication.

Laura Horner Carnell (September 7, 1867 - March 30, 1929) was an American educator and the first dean of Temple University.

== Formative years ==
Born in Philadelphia on September 7, 1867, Carnell graduated from the Philadelphia Normal School in 1866. In 1895, she was asked by Temple University founder Russell Conwell to join Temple's faculty. During her tenure, she helped found the Women's Department, and was named acting dean in 1897. In 1905, she was named dean, and served in that post until 1925; she then became associate president. Carnell was also named to the Philadelphia Board of Public Education in 1923. In 1924 she was president of the Deans of Women of the State of Pennsylvania.

== Honors ==
Temple University has established Laura Carnell professorships to "recognize faculty who have distinguished themselves in research, scholarship, the creative arts and teaching."

The Laura H. Carnell School in Philadelphia, Oxford Circle was also named in her honor.
