= St. Josaphat Ukrainian Catholic Church =

Church in Philadelphia, Pennsylvania, United States

Coordinates: 40.02760°N 75.04375°W

St. Josaphat Ukrainian Catholic Church, Philadelphia, is located in Philadelphia at 4521 Longshore Ave. It serves the Ukrainian speaking population in the area.

== History ==
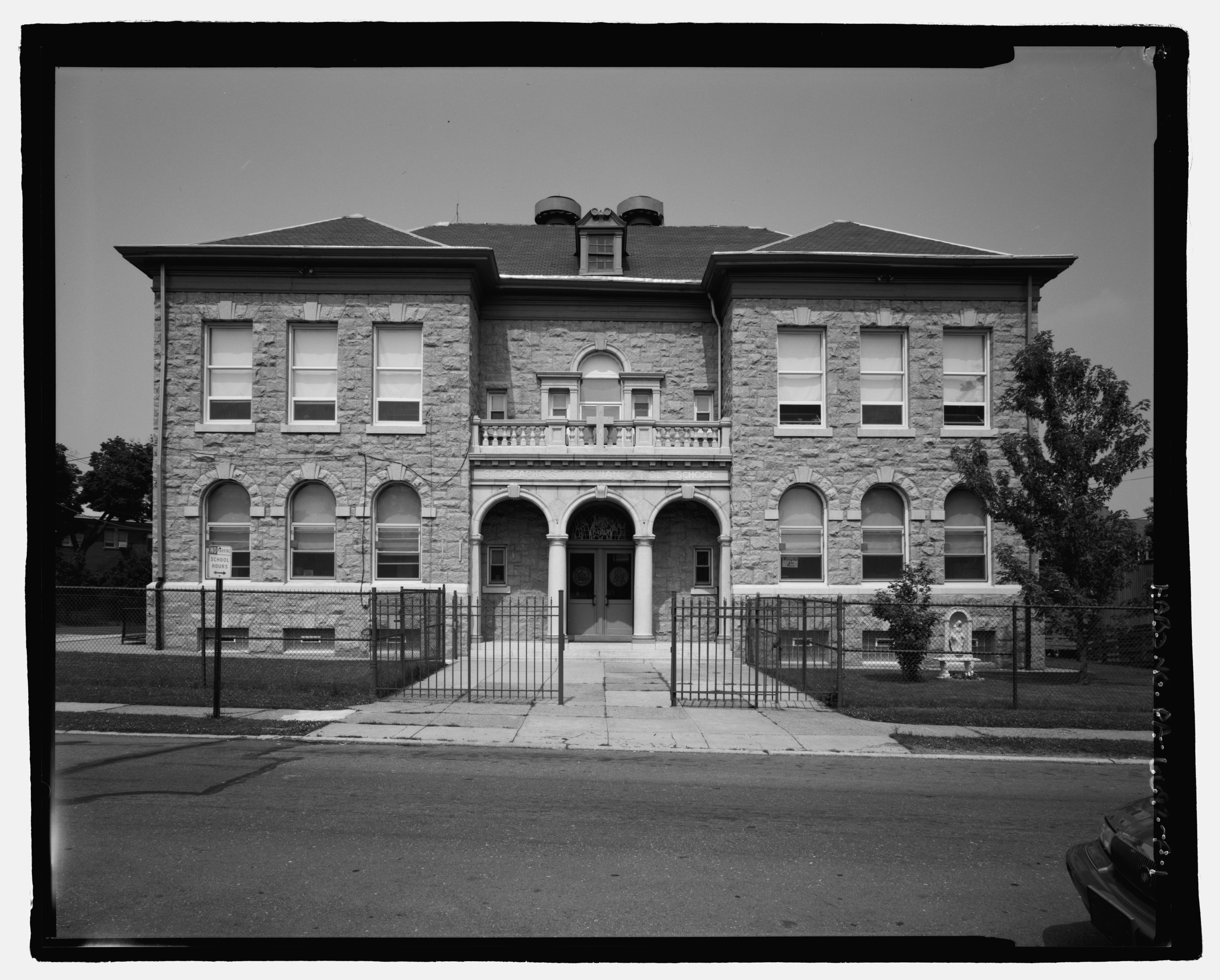
St. Josaphat Ukrainian Catholic School building

The parish was founded in 1914 to serve those of the Ukrainian language in Northeast Philadelphia. Initially services were held in St. John Cantius Church in Bridesburg and in the homes of various parishioners. The first pastor was Volodymyr Petriwsky who served from 1915 to 1924. He was responsible for various innovations, such as having English taught, creating evening courses, and teaching the illiterate. In 1916 a Methodist house of prayer was purchased, along with its rectory, for the sum of $15,000.
