= Benjamin Franklin Academics Plus School =

- Benjamin Franklin School
- U.S. National Register of Historic Places
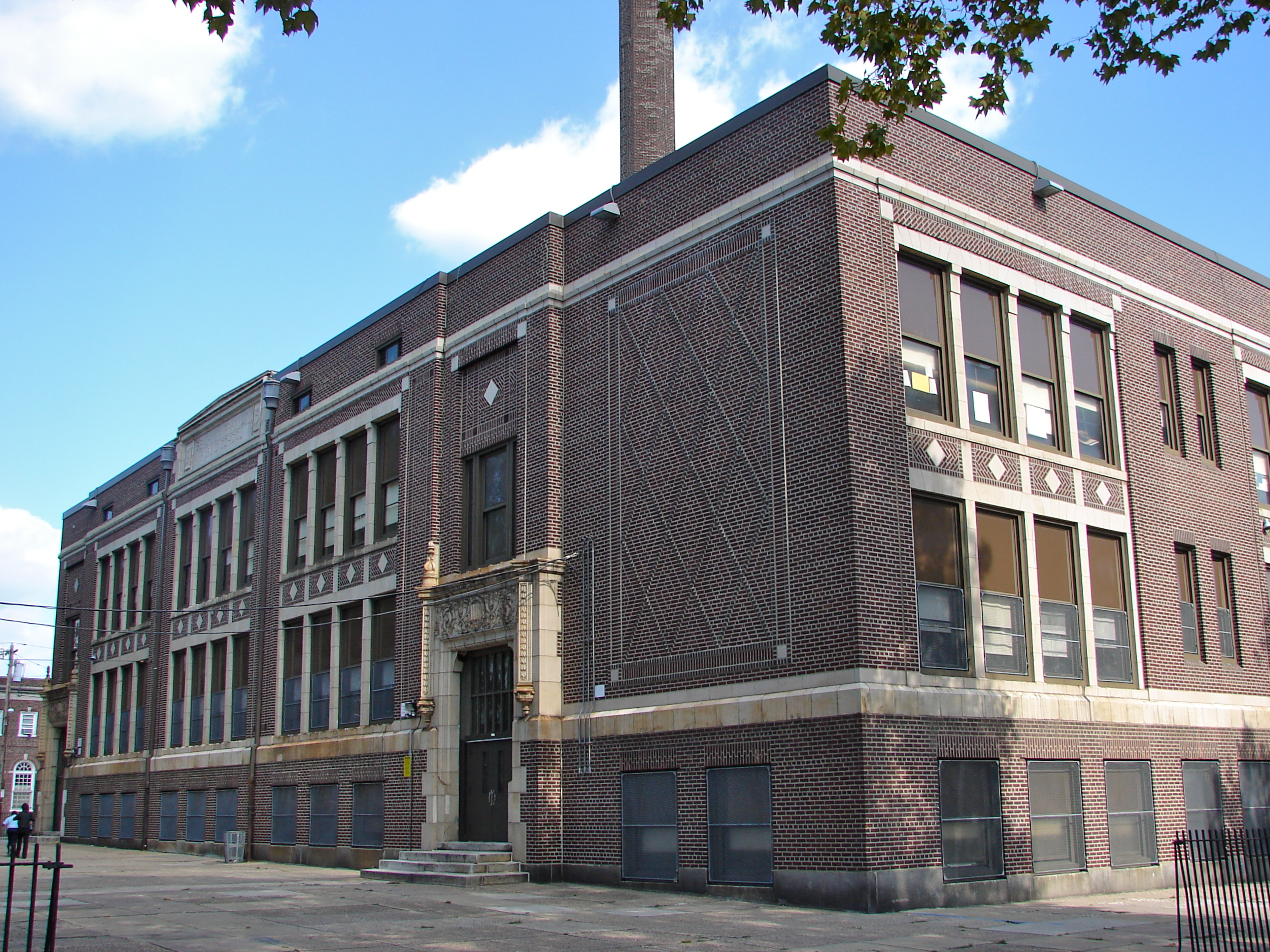
- Benjamin Franklin School, October 2010

- Location within Philadelphia Location within Pennsylvania Location within the United States
- Location: 5737 Rising Sun Ave., Philadelphia, Pennsylvania
- Coordinates: 40.0424°N 75.1042°W
- Area: 2.1 acres (0.85 ha)
- Built: 1915
- Built by: William R. Dougherty
- Architect: Henry deCourcy Richards
- Architectural style: Late Gothic Revival, Utilitarian
- MPS: Philadelphia Public Schools TR
- NRHP reference No.: 88002274
- Added to NRHP: November 18, 1988

The Benjamin Franklin Academics Plus School is a historic elementary school in the Crescentville neighborhood of Philadelphia, Pennsylvania. It is part of the School District of Philadelphia.

The building was added to the National Register of Historic Places in 1988.

== History and architectural features ==
The building was designed by Henry deCourcy Richards and was built in 1915. It is a two-story, five-bay, brick building tt was erected atop a raised basement in the Late Gothic Revival style. Additions were built in 1931 and 1954. It features entrances with carved stone and terra cotta surrounds and a brick parapet. The school was named for Benjamin Franklin.
