= Brownhill & Kramer Hosiery Mill =

- U.S. National Register of Historic Places
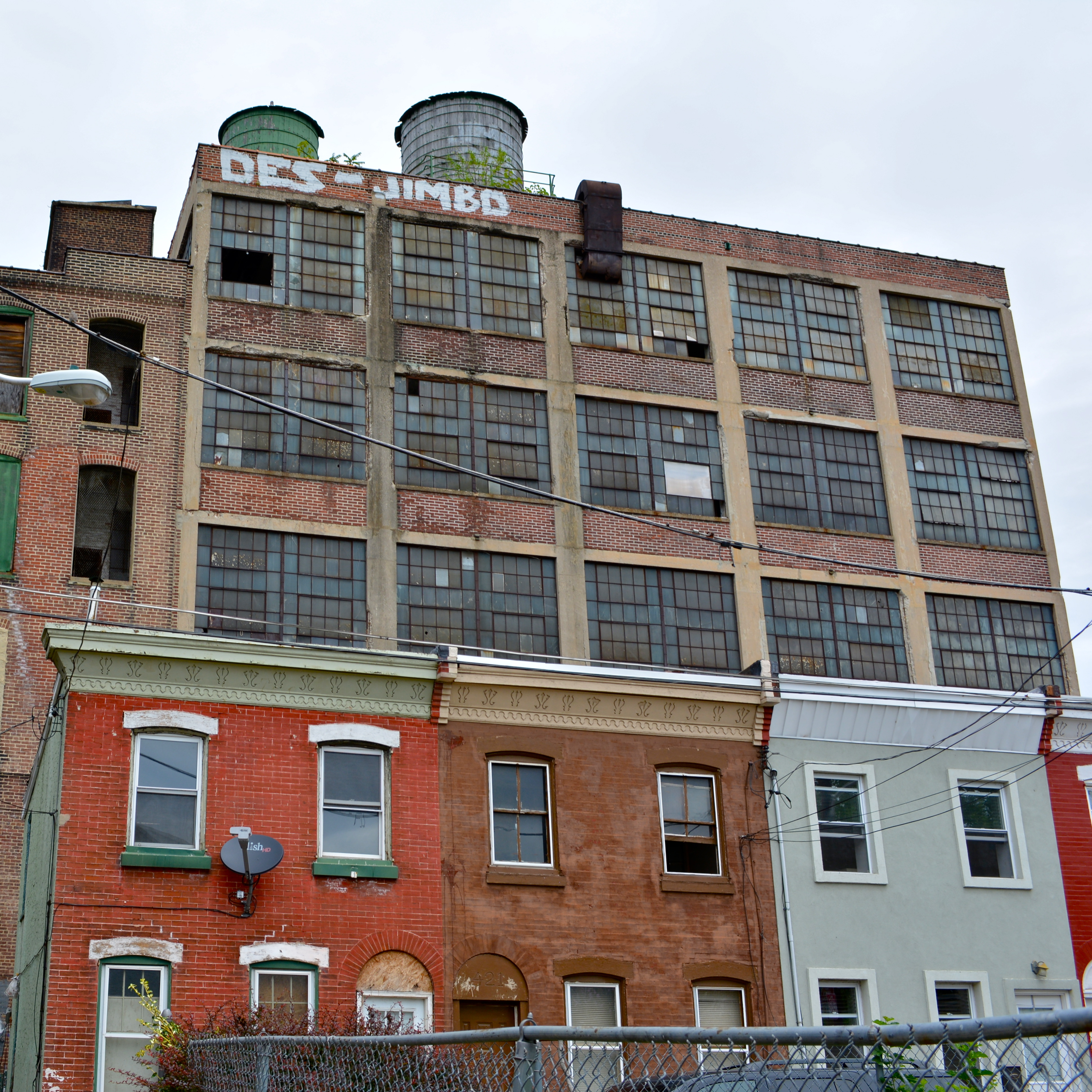

- Location within Philadelphia Location within Pennsylvania Location within the United States
- Location: 406-426 Memphis Street, 1421-1437 E. Columbia Avenue, Philadelphia, Pennsylvania
- Coordinates: 39°58′27″N 75°7′56″W
- Area: 0.60 acres (0.24 ha)
- Built: 1905
- Architect: William Steele & Sons
- NRHP reference No.: 14000096
- Added to NRHP: March 31, 2014

The Brownhill & Kramer Hosiery Mill is a historic building complex in the Fishtown neighborhood of Philadelphia, Pennsylvania.

It was listed on the National Register of Historic Places in 2014.

The buildings have been rehabbed into rental apartment units and are now known as the Chesterman Building. The building is now managed by GY Properties which is a Philadelphia-based property management and development firm.
