= Holme Avenue Bridge =

- U.S. National Register of Historic Places
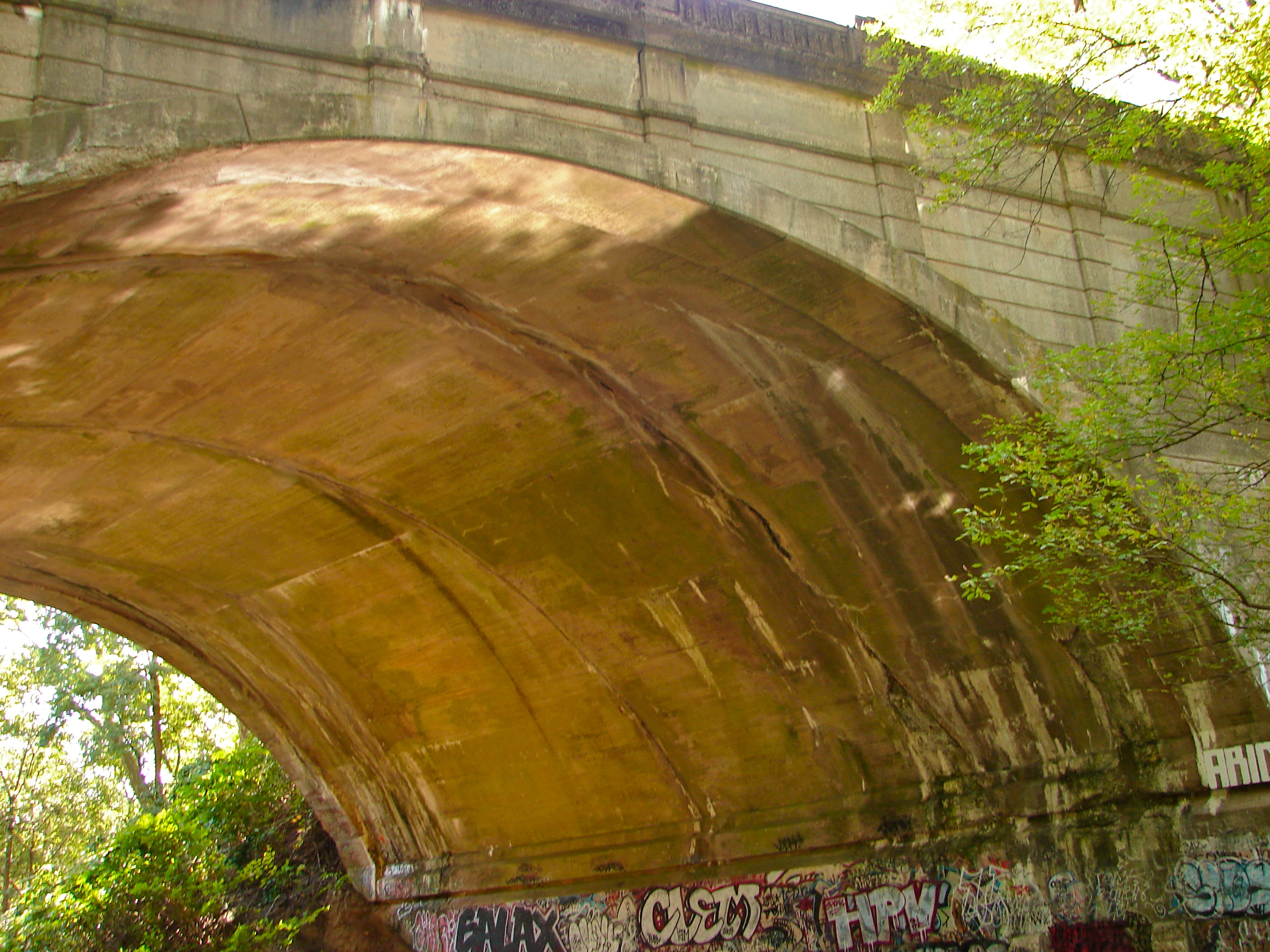
- Holme Avenue Bridge

- Location within Philadelphia Location within Pennsylvania Location within the United States
- Location: Philadelphia, Pennsylvania
- Coordinates: 40°3′23″N 75°1′24″W
- Built: 1921
- Architect: C. P. Boner
- MPS: Highway Bridges Owned by the Commonwealth of Pennsylvania, Department of Transportation TR
- NRHP reference No.: 88000806
- Added to NRHP: June 22, 1988

The Holme Avenue Bridge is a closed-spandrel concrete arch bridge that carries Holme Avenue across Wooden Bridge Run (a tributary of Pennypack Creek) in Philadelphia, Pennsylvania. Owned by the Commonwealth of Pennsylvania's Department of Transportation, it should not be confused with the other "Holme Avenue Bridge" over Pennypack Creek about 1,000 yards west of Wooden Bridge Run.

According to the Pennsylvania Historical and Museum Commission, this bridge "is a good example of an urban concrete bridge embellished to imitate stone."

== History and architectural features ==
Built in 1921 by C. P. Boner, contractor, this bridge remains in use today. Its total length is 101.1 feet (30.8 m); the width of its deck is 83.8 feet (25.5 m).

Its concrete superstructure includes parapet railings with pebbled, recessed panels. Its concrete substructure includes smooth abutments, etched and pebbled wings, smooth intrados/ribs, and etched voussoirs.

It was listed on the National Register of Historic Places in 1988.
