= Lawndale, Philadelphia =

Lawndale
- Neighborhood of Philadelphia
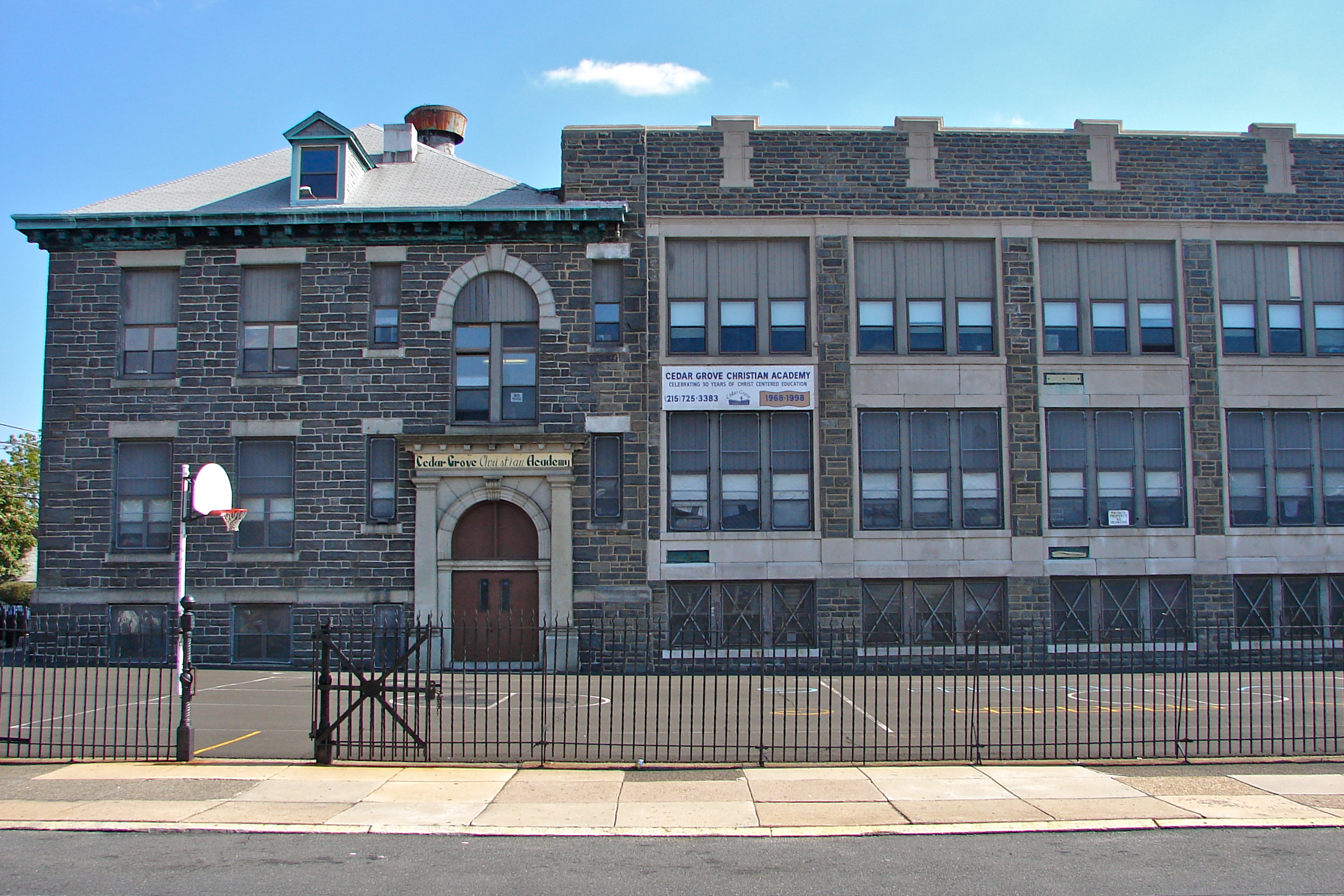
- Lawndale School, October 2010

- Location within Philadelphia
- Country: United States
- State: Pennsylvania
- County: Philadelphia County
- City: Philadelphia
- Area codes: 215, 267, and 445

Lawndale is a neighborhood in Northeast Philadelphia, Pennsylvania, United States. It is located near Rising Sun and Oxford avenues and is south of Cottman Avenue.

Despite the city's notation on the link below, Lawndale originally was named back in the 1880s - The name can be found on City Maps and Reading Railroad Maps dating back to the late 19th century. Prior to that, the community was referred to as Marburg, with its central "business area" around the Kensington & Oxford Turnpike/Second Street Pike (Rising Sun Ave) and Benner, Colgate, and Comly streets. Included in this "industrial" area were the Marburg Bottling Company and a slaughter house, among other businesses. Its more residential end was near the current intersection of Rising Sun Avenue and Levick Street. Levick Street is home to many of the oldest nonfarming homes in the community, many of which were built out of wood. The oldest building still standing in the original community is what is now the Campbell's Funeral Home, which was at one time Paul Mahle's General store in addition to being a farm house. Several older stone homes surround this property and were all part of the Hellerman farm complex. The Hellerman Farms (multiple) owned the most property in this area when it was part of Oxford Township prior to the turn of the 20th century. Much of it was bought up by the Wentz Family of Olney after the 1854 consolidation act. Other land owners included the Fords, the Drakes, the Wolfs, the Brous, the Passmores, the Fesmiers, the Gillhams, the Atwoods, the Unruhs, the Woodfalls, and the Pierce Families.

The name Lawndale can be traced on paper back to when the Philadelphia, Newtown & New York Railroad built its line through the area. One of the first stations listed north of Olney was Lawndale. It was opened in the 1890s and later closed, only to be reopened in the early teens of the new century to accommodate the growing community. The railroad was taken over by the Philadelphia & Reading by then and a small room was leased from a gentleman who lived at the bottom of Robbins Street, whose home faced the railroad. This temporary arrangement lasted for well over 30 years, until the owner died and the railroad was forced to build a small shelter. The Lawndale Station has seen many reincarnations over the years and is still in daily use by SEPTA with the stopping of 45 scheduled passenger trains a day and over 350 round trip fares a day. The physical location of the Lawndale Station property is actually in Montgomery County/Cheltenham Township, while nearby Cheltenham Station (which primarily serves the North end of Lawndale in addition to some residents from Cheltenham, PA. and seeing an additional 400 round trip fares a day) is actually located in Philadelphia County.

Lawndale is home to many diverse residential buildings. There are blocks of row houses, mixed in with singles, twins and even large estate type homes. Most of the community was built in three stages: pre-1920s, 1920–1930 and 1950–1960. Fewer than 40 homes have been built since the 1970s. This mix of housing has kept the area as one of the more desirable places to live in Philadelphia, and is often a secret to many. People are always surprised at the diversity of the housing stock.

The community is home to many Protestant churches, with the oldest being the Trinity Oxford Church which traces its beginnings in the community back to 1698, when the area was part of Oxford Township. Church records confirm the issue of when the community was named; they record the Lawndale name as far back as the late 19th century.

The area is served by two Catholic parishes and one Catholic School: St. William's Parish at Rising Sun and Devereaux Ave. and Presentation BVM Parish at Martins Mill/Old Soldiers Road and Hasbrook Ave in nearby Cheltenham Township with a combined Catholic Population of about 9,000 people, or 3,000 families. Only Presentation BVM School Remains, as St. William School was closed in 2012 due to low enrollment. There was a public school also located within, Lawndale Elementary, but this school was closed some time in the 1980s and sold to the Cedar Grove Church (Rising Sun and Tabor) which has operated it successfully as the Cedar Grove Christian Academy. The former Lawndale School was added to the National Register of Historic Places in 1988. Combined enrollment of the two schools is just over 800 students.

There are no public schools that officially serve the community of Lawndale. The nearest public grade school is Ben Franklin Elementary in Crescentville, which has just over 1100 students and Creighton Elementary, also in Crescenville, with over 800 students. Local high schools are Northeast in Rhawnhurst and Samuel Fels High School in Oxford Circle/Summerdale. Catholic high school students have several options, but the closest and most popular local school was Cardinal Dougherty in Olney, until its closure in 2009.

The Lawncrest Recreation Center serves both the Lawndale and Crescentville communities, as does the Lawncrest Library and Engine 64 Fire House. All are located on Rising Sun Ave between Lardner and Comly streets.

There is a main business district that stretches from Robbins to Longshore Avenue and is home to well over 200 stores of various degrees. With the boundaries of Lawndale, which are Comly Street to the South, SEPTA/CSX Transportation to the West, Longshore/Tyson Ave to the North and Pennway Ave to the East there are well over 500 businesses. One of the Largest employers in the area is the Naval Supply Depot which employs over 5,000 civilian and military workers.
