= Adams Avenue Bridge =

- Adams Avenue Bridge in Philadelphia
- U.S. National Register of Historic Places
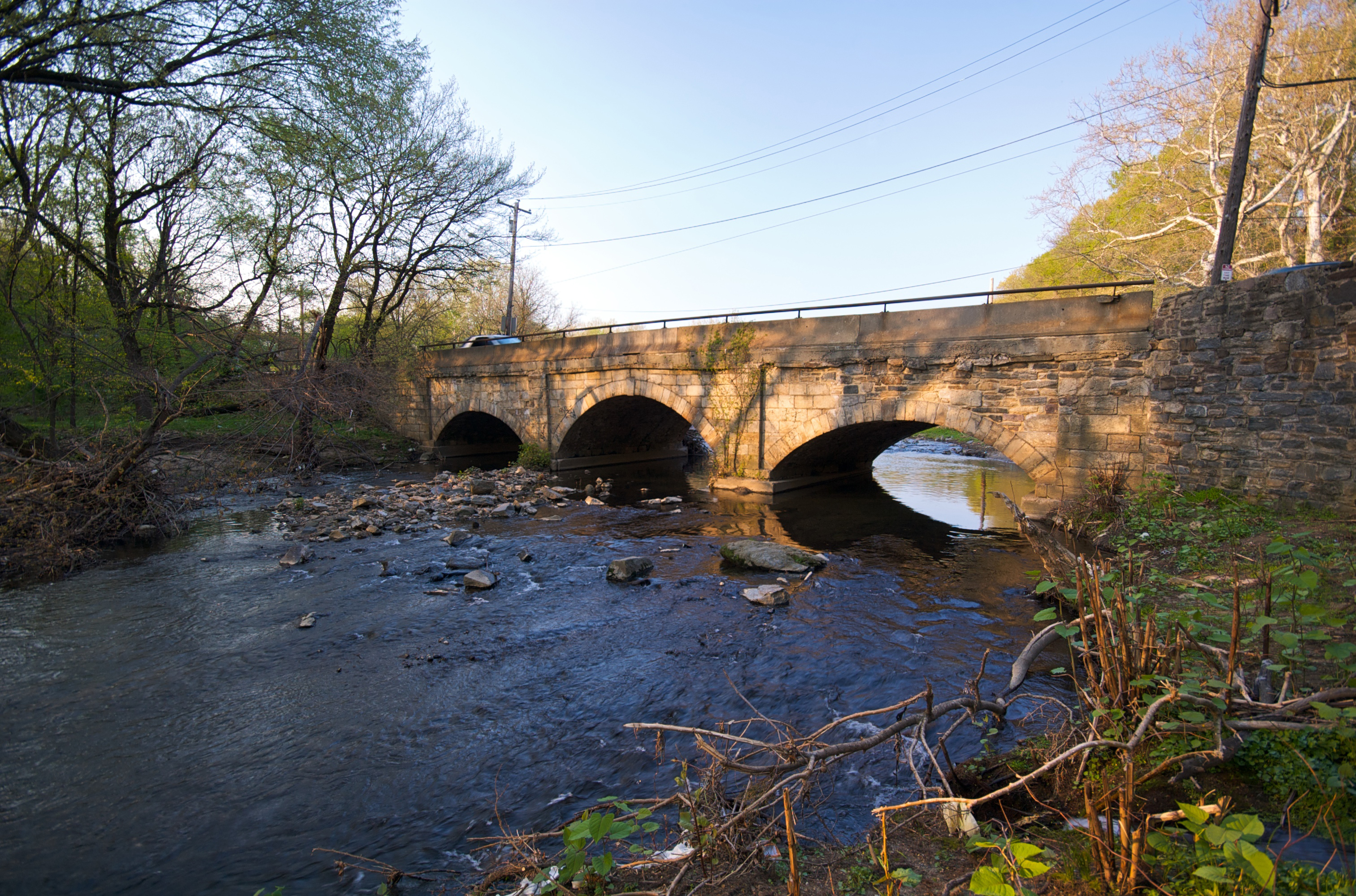
- Adams Ave Bridge in 2010

- Location within Philadelphia Location within Pennsylvania Location within the United States
- Location: Adams Ave. over Tacony Creek; Philadelphia, Pennsylvania
- Coordinates: 40°2′31″N 75°6′48″W
- Built: 1901
- MPS: Highway Bridges Owned by the Commonwealth of Pennsylvania, Department of Transportation TR
- NRHP reference No.: 88000851
- Added to NRHP: June 22, 1988

The Adams Avenue Bridge is a historic bridge in Philadelphia, Pennsylvania. It carries Adams Avenue over the Tacony Creek in Tacony Creek Park. It is a two-lane, triple-span, closed-spandrel, filled stone arch bridge, built in 1901.

It was listed on the National Register of Historic Places in 1988.
