= Ethan Allen School =

- U.S. National Register of Historic Places
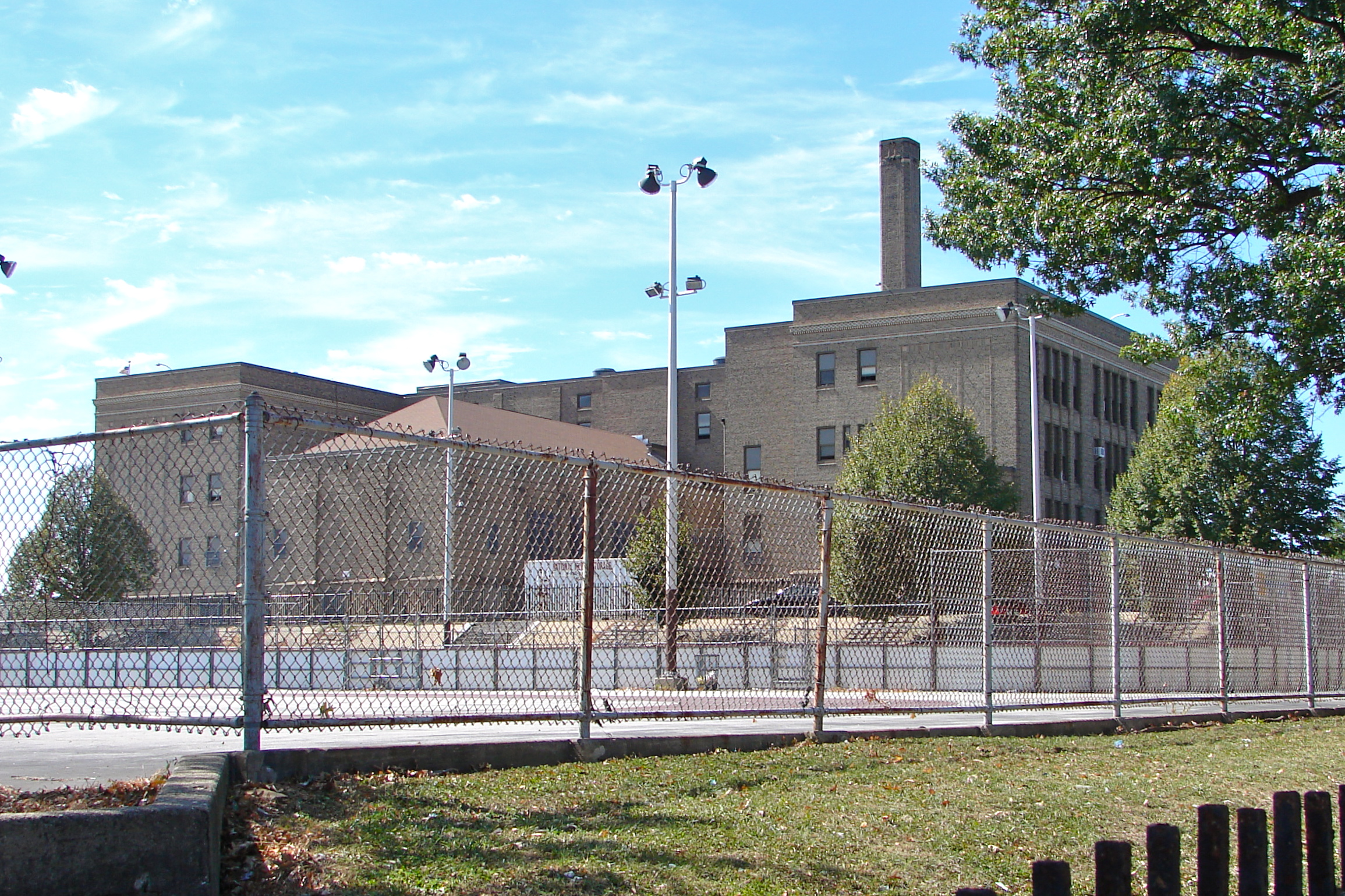
- Ethan Allen School, September 2010

- Location within Philadelphia Location within Pennsylvania Location within the United States
- Location: 6329 Battersby St, Philadelphia, Pennsylvania, U.S.
- Coordinates: 40°01′47″N 75°03′43″W
- Area: 4 acres (1.6 ha)
- Built: 1929–1930
- Architects: Catharine, Irwin T.
- Architectural style: Art Deco
- MPS: Philadelphia Public Schools TR
- NRHP reference No.: 88002227
- Added to NRHP: November 18, 1988

Ethan Allen School is a K–8 school which is located in the Mayfair neighborhood of Philadelphia, Pennsylvania. It is part of the School District of Philadelphia.

It was added to the National Register of Historic Places in 1988.

== History and architectural features ==
This historic school building was designed by Irwin T. Catharine and was built between 1929 and 1930. A three-story, eight-bay, yellow brick building in the Art Deco style, it features an arched entryway with terra cotta trim, terra cotta cornice, and brick parapet. It was named for patriot Ethan Allen.

Students zoned to Ethan Allen are also zoned to Abraham Lincoln High School.
