= Edwin Forrest School =

- U.S. National Register of Historic Places
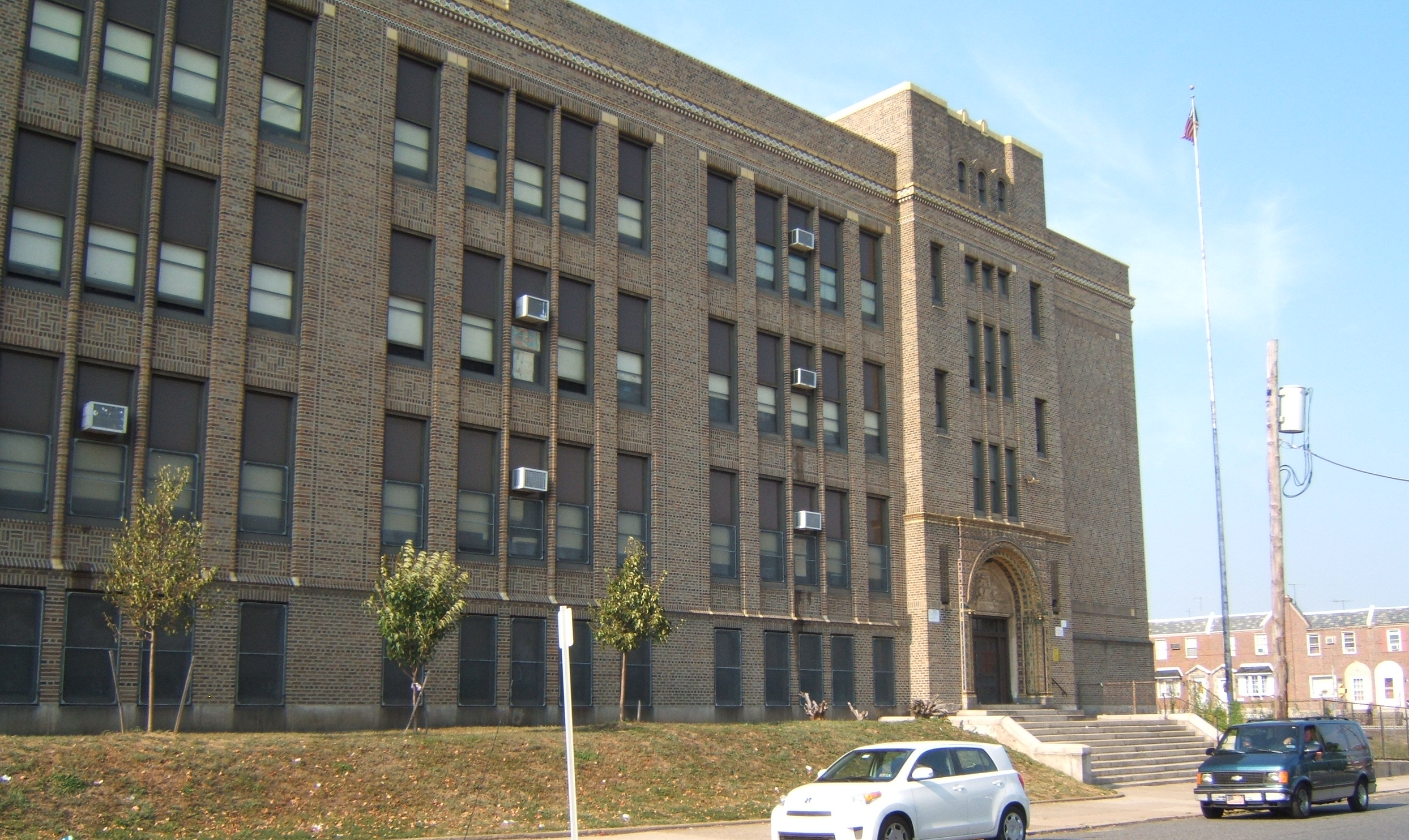
- Edwin Forrest School, September 2010

- Location within Philadelphia Location within Pennsylvania Location within the United States
- Location: 7300 Cottage St, Philadelphia, Pennsylvania
- Coordinates: 40°02′04″N 75°02′09″W
- Area: 3.2 acres (1.3 ha)
- Built: 1928–1929
- Architect: Catharine, Irwin T.
- Architectural style: Art Deco
- MPS: Philadelphia Public Schools TR
- NRHP reference No.: 88002273
- Added to NRHP: November 18, 1988

Edwin Forrest School is a public elementary school located in the Mayfair neighborhood of Philadelphia, Pennsylvania. It is within the School District of Philadelphia.

It was designed by Irwin T. Catharine and built in 1928–1929. It is a three-story, eight-bay, yellow brick building in the Art Deco style. It features an arched entryway with terra cotta trim, terra cotta cornice, and brick parapet. It was named for actor Edwin Forrest (1806–1872).

It was added to the National Register of Historic Places in 1988.

Students zoned to Forrest are also zoned to Austin Meehan Middle School and Abraham Lincoln High School.
