= Willard School =

Willard School may refer to:

- Emma Willard School, a day and boarding school for young women in Troy, New York
- Frances E. Willard School, an elementary school in Philadelphia, Pennsylvania
- Willard Elementary School, Natrona County, Wyoming
- Willard Residential College, part of Northwestern University in Evanston, Illinois
- Willard School, original name of the Indiana School for the Deaf

== See also ==
- Willard High School (disambiguation)
