= Cramp & Co. =

Defunct construction company in Philadelphia

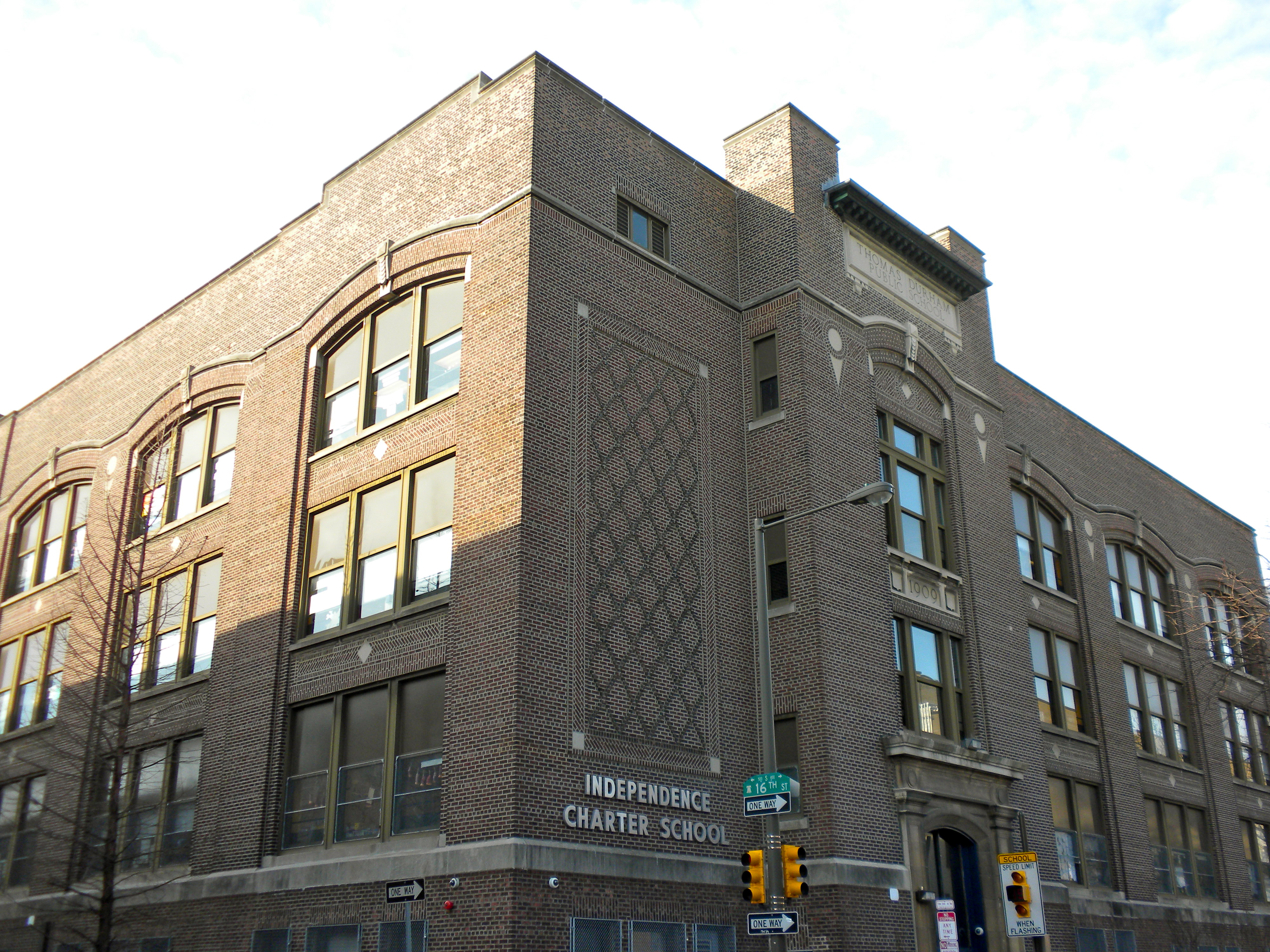
Thomas Durham School

Cramp & Co. was a building company in Philadelphia. Many of its works are listed on the U.S. National Register of Historic Places. It worked sometimes in conjunction with architect Henry deCourcy Richards.

Works (and variations on attribution) include:

- Thomas Durham School, built 1909, 1600 Lombard St., Philadelphia, PA (Cramp & Co.), NRHP-listed
- The Bronx Opera House, built 1912-1913, 436 East 149th street, Bronx, New York
- Feltonville School No. 2, 4901 Rising Sun Ave., Philadelphia, PA (Cramp & Co.), NRHP-listed
- Thomas Fitzsimons Junior High School, 2601 W. Cumberland St., Philadelphia, PA (Cramp & Co.), NRHP-listed
- Horace Furness Junior High School, 1900 S. Third St., Philadelphia, PA (Cramp & Co.), NRHP-listed
- Charles Wolcott Henry School, 601-645 W. Carpenter Ln., Philadelphia, PA (Cramp & Co.), NRHP-listed
- John Story Jenks School, 8301-8317 Germantown Ave., Philadelphia, PA (Cramp & Co.), NRHP-listed
- John L. Kinsey School, Sixty-fifth Ave. and Limekiln Pike, Philadelphia, PA (Cramp & Co.), NRHP-listed
- Henry C. Lea School of Practice, 242 S. 47th St., Philadelphia, PA (Cramp & Co.), NRHP-listed
- Alexander K. McClure School, 4139 N. 6th St., Philadelphia, PA (Cramp & Co.), NRHP-listed
- Quakertown Passenger and Freight Station, Front and East Broad Sts., Quakertown, PA (Cramp and Co.), NRHP-listed
- John Greenleaf Whittier School, 2600 Clearfield St., Philadelphia, PA (Cramp & Co.), NRHP-listed
- St. James Building, 117 West Duval Street, Jacksonville, FL (terracotta)
