= Cramp (disambiguation) =

A cramp is a sudden, involuntary muscle contraction, often temporarily painful and paralysing.

Cramp or cramps may also refer to:

- Abdominal cramps, another term for abdominal pain
- Menstrual cramps, another term for dysmenorrhea
- Writer's cramp, a movement disorder
- Clamp (tool), sometimes known as a cramp
- Cramp (heraldry), a hooked device in German heraldry
- The Cramps, a garage punk band
- Cramp & Co., built many schools etc. in Philadelphia in the 20th century
- William Cramp & Sons, built many ships in Philadelphia in the late 19th and early 20th centuries

People

- Charlie Cramp (1876–1933), British trade unionist
- Stanley Cramp (1913–1987), British ornithologist
- Rosemary Cramp (1929–2023), British archaeologist
- Isabella Cramp (born 2004), American voice actress
- Sid Cramp, Australian politician
