= S. Weir Mitchell School =

- U.S. National Register of Historic Places
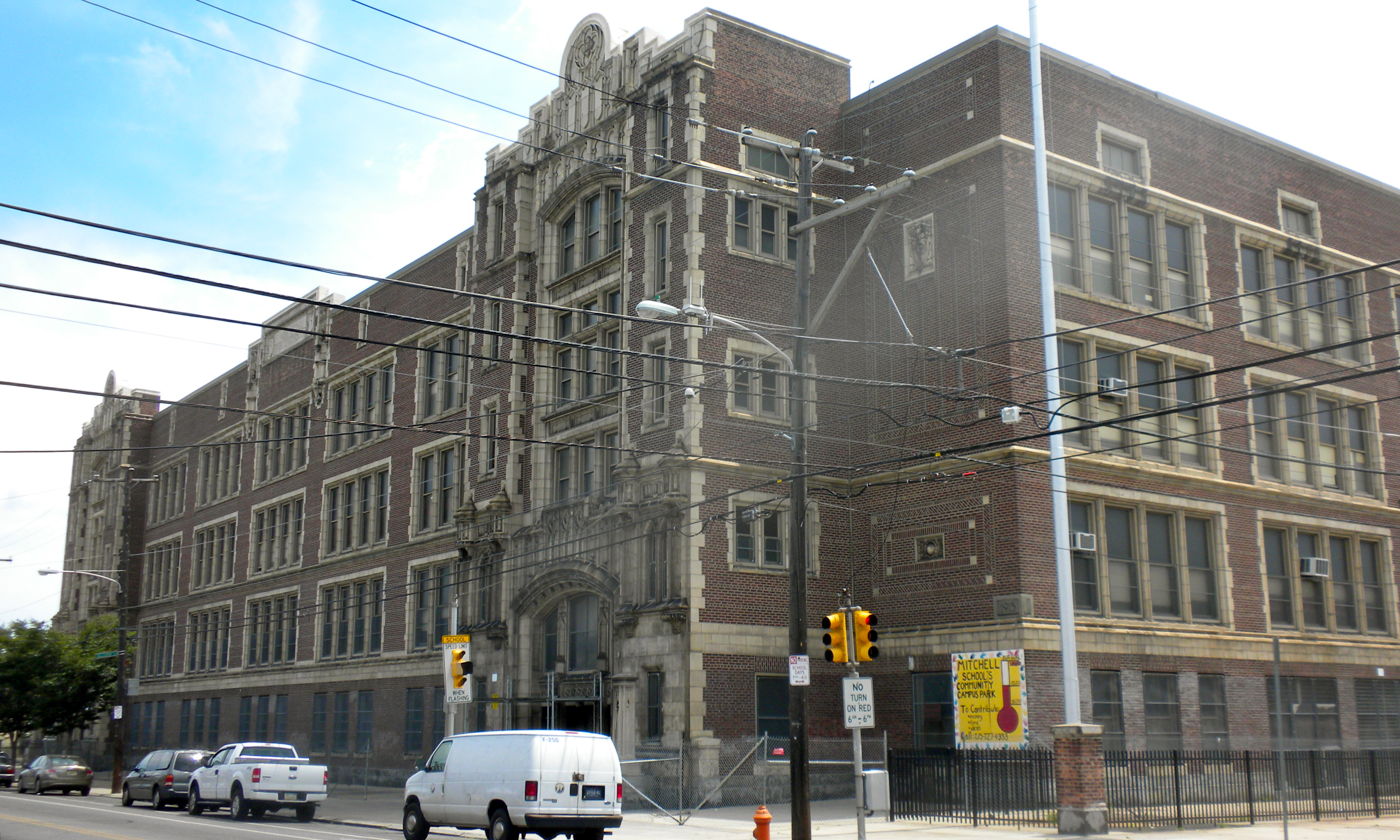
- S. Weir Mitchell School, June 2010

- Location within Philadelphia Location within Pennsylvania Location within the United States
- Location: 5500 Kingsessing Ave., Philadelphia, Pennsylvania
- Coordinates: 39.9369°N 75.2237°W
- Area: 2 acres (0.81 ha)
- Built: 1915–1916
- Built by: David Peoples
- Architect: Henry deCoursey Richards
- Architectural style: Late Gothic Revival, Academic Gothic
- MPS: Philadelphia Public Schools TR
- NRHP reference No.: 86003309
- Added to NRHP: December 4, 1986

The S. Weir Mitchell Elementary School is a historic American elementary school in the Kingsessing neighborhood of Philadelphia, Pennsylvania. It is part of the School District of Philadelphia.

It was added to the National Register of Historic Places in 1986.

== History and architectural features ==
This building was designed by Henry deCoursey Richards and built between 1915 and 1916. It is a four-story, seven-bay, red brick building with terra cotta and granite trim. Created in the Late Gothic Revival style, it was erected above a raised basement and features a projecting entrance bay with oversized, arched-surround, projecting, secondary entrance bays, terra cotta quoining, and an arched gable parapet.
