= James Russell Lowell School (Philadelphia) =

Historic elementary school in the Olney neighborhood of Philadelphia

- U.S. National Register of Historic Places
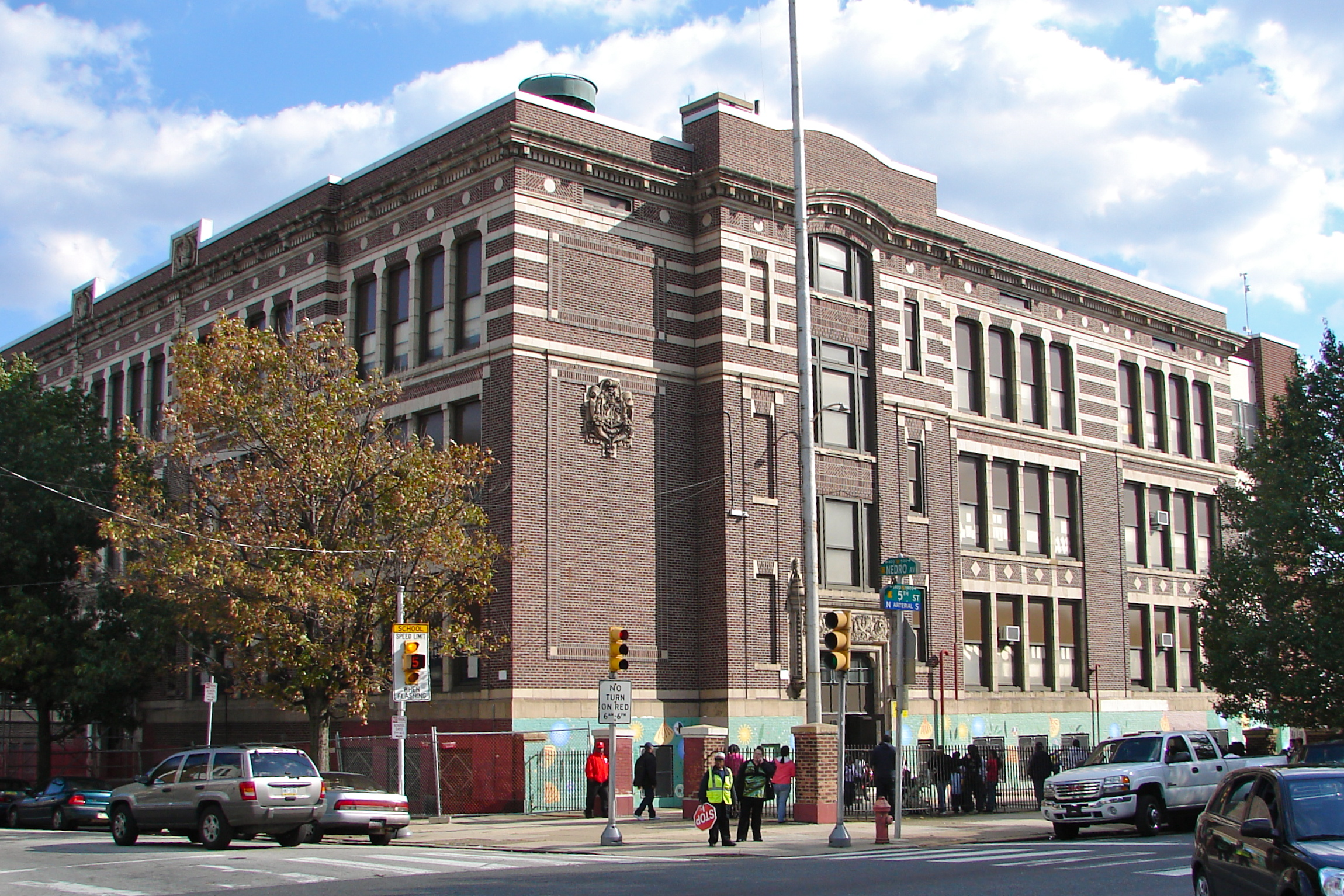
- James Russell Lowell School, October 2010

- Location within Philadelphia Location within Pennsylvania Location within the United States
- Location: 450 W. Nedro Ave., Philadelphia, Pennsylvania
- Coordinates: 40°2′26″N 75°7′46″W
- Area: 2.4 acres (0.97 ha)
- Built: 1913–1914
- Built by: Charles McCaul Co.
- Architect: Henry deCourcy Richards
- Architectural style: Classical Revival
- MPS: Philadelphia Public Schools TR
- NRHP reference No.: 88002295
- Added to NRHP: November 18, 1988

The James Russell Lowell School is a historic, American elementary school that is located in the Olney neighborhood of Philadelphia, Pennsylvania.

It is part of the School District of Philadelphia and was added to the National Register of Historic Places in 1988.

== History and architectural features ==
This historic building was designed by Henry deCourcy Richards, and was built between 1913 and 1914. It is a three-story, five-bay, reinforced concrete building with brick facing and granite and terra cotta trim, and was designed in a Classical Revival-style. It features decorative panels and a center entrance topped by an entablature. The school was named for American Romantic poet, critic, editor, and diplomat James Russell Lowell (1819-1891).
