= Gen. David B. Birney School =

- U.S. National Register of Historic Places
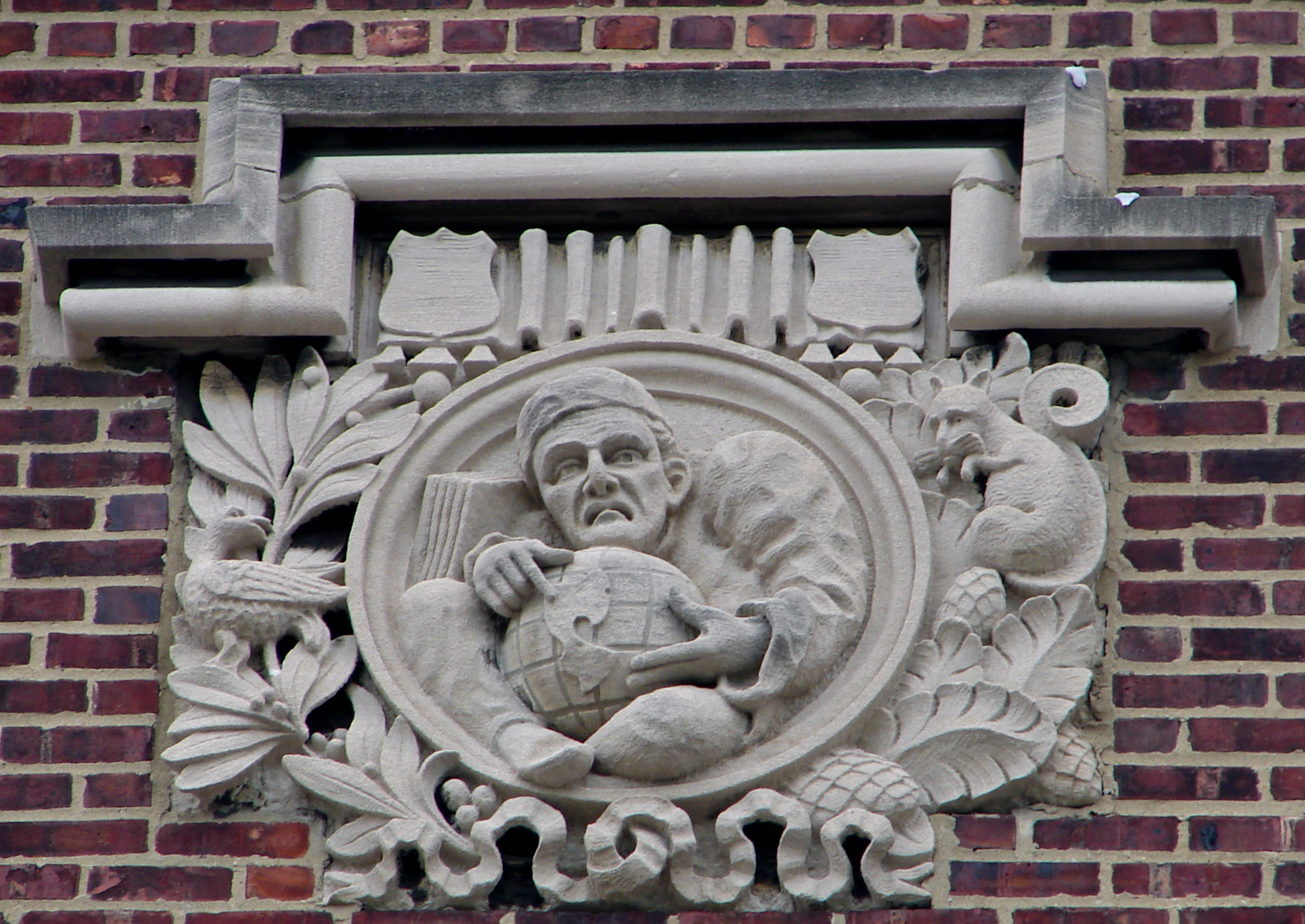
- Gen. David B. Birney School decorative panel, September 2010

- Location within Philadelphia Location within Pennsylvania Location within the United States
- Location: 900 W. Lindley St., Philadelphia, Pennsylvania
- Coordinates: 40°01′45″N 75°08′19″W
- Area: 2.5 acres (1.0 ha)
- Built: 1912-1913
- Built by: Wehmeyer, H.H.
- Architect: Richards, Henry deCourcy
- Architectural style: Tudor Revival
- MPS: Philadelphia Public Schools TR
- NRHP reference No.: 88002246
- Added to NRHP: November 18, 1988

Gen. David B. Birney School is a historic school building located in the Logan neighborhood of Philadelphia. Originally built for the School District of Philadelphia, it was designed by Henry deCourcy Richards and built in 1912–1913. The building is now home to The Lindley Academy Charter School At Birney, a charter school within the School District of Philadelphia.

The building is a three-story, five-bay, reinforced concrete building in the Tudor Revival-style. It is faced in brick and features a limestone center entrance with entablature and decorative panels.

The school was named for Civil War General David B. Birney (1825-1864), son of the noted abolitionist James G. Birney.

It was added to the National Register of Historic Places in 1988.
