= Nathaniel Hawthorne School =

- U.S. National Register of Historic Places
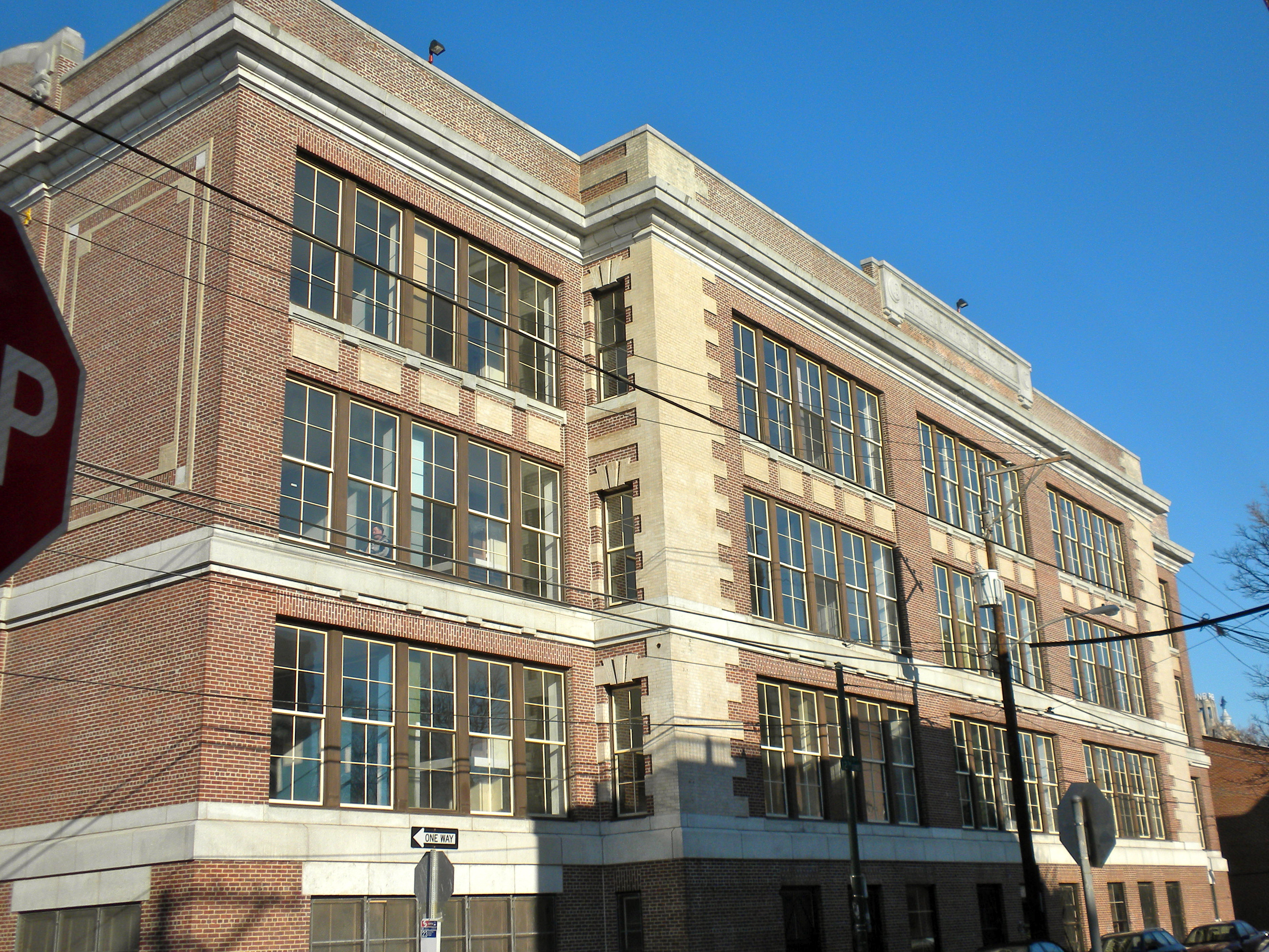
- Nathaniel Hawthorne School, February 2010

- Location within Philadelphia Location within Pennsylvania Location within the United States
- Location: 712 S. Twelfth St., Philadelphia, Pennsylvania, United States
- Coordinates: 39°56′30″N 75°09′44″W
- Area: 2 acres (0.81 ha)
- Built: 1907–1908; 118 years ago
- Architect: Henry deCoursey Richards
- Architectural style: Classical Revival
- MPS: Philadelphia Public Schools TR
- NRHP reference No.: 86003289
- Added to NRHP: December 4, 1986

The Nathaniel Hawthorne School is a historic school building that is located in the Hawthorne neighborhood of Philadelphia, Pennsylvania, United States.

The building was added to the National Register of Historic Places in 1986.

== History and architectural features ==
Designed by Henry deCoursey Richards and built between 1907 and 1908, this historic structure is a four-story, E-shaped, reinforced concrete building that is clad in brick. Created in the Classical Revival-style, it features an entrance with hooded limestone surround, terra cotta trim, limestone quoins, and an arched shaped parapet. This school was named for author Nathaniel Hawthorne.
