= Henry C. Lea Elementary School =

- Henry C. Lea School of Practice
- U.S. National Register of Historic Places
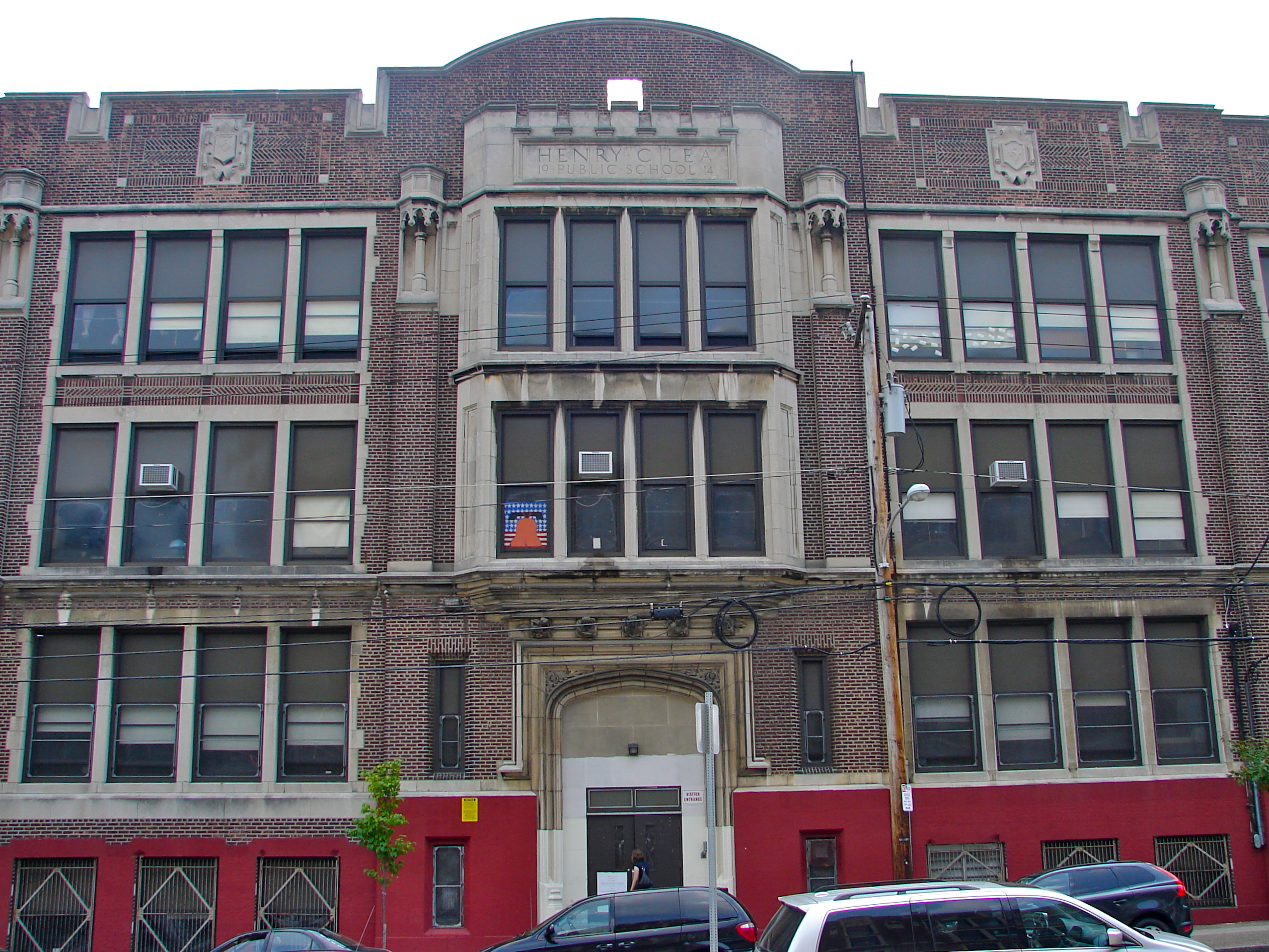
- Henry C. Lea School of Practice, September 2010

- Location within Philadelphia Location within Pennsylvania Location within the United States
- Location: 4700 Locust Street., Philadelphia, Pennsylvania
- Coordinates: 39.9545°N 75.2163°W
- Area: 3 acres (1.2 ha)
- Built: 1914
- Built by: Cramp & Co.
- Architect: Henry deCourcy Richards
- Architectural style: Late Gothic Revival
- MPS: Philadelphia Public Schools TR
- NRHP reference No.: 88002291
- Added to NRHP: November 18, 1988

Henry C. Lea Elementary School is a historic elementary school in the Walnut Hill neighborhood of Philadelphia, Pennsylvania. Part of the School District of Philadelphia, it was named after the publisher, civic activist and historian Henry Charles Lea. The school is supported by the University of Pennsylvania through a program where multiple Penn-affiliated schools, departments, and centers work with Lea students and staff.

== History and architecture ==
The building was designed by Henry deCourcy Richards and built by Cramp & Co. in 1914. It is a three-story, five-bay, reinforced concrete building that was faced with brick and with terra cotta and granite trim. It sits on a raised basement, was designed in the Late Gothic Revival-style, and features a Classical limestone center entrance surround, a central two-story bay window, decorative panels, crenelated parapet, and a projecting entrance bay. It was previously used as an "observation school" for teacher education and training.

The building was added to the National Register of Historic Places in 1988 as the Henry C. Lea School of Practice.
