= William B. Hanna School =

- U.S. National Register of Historic Places
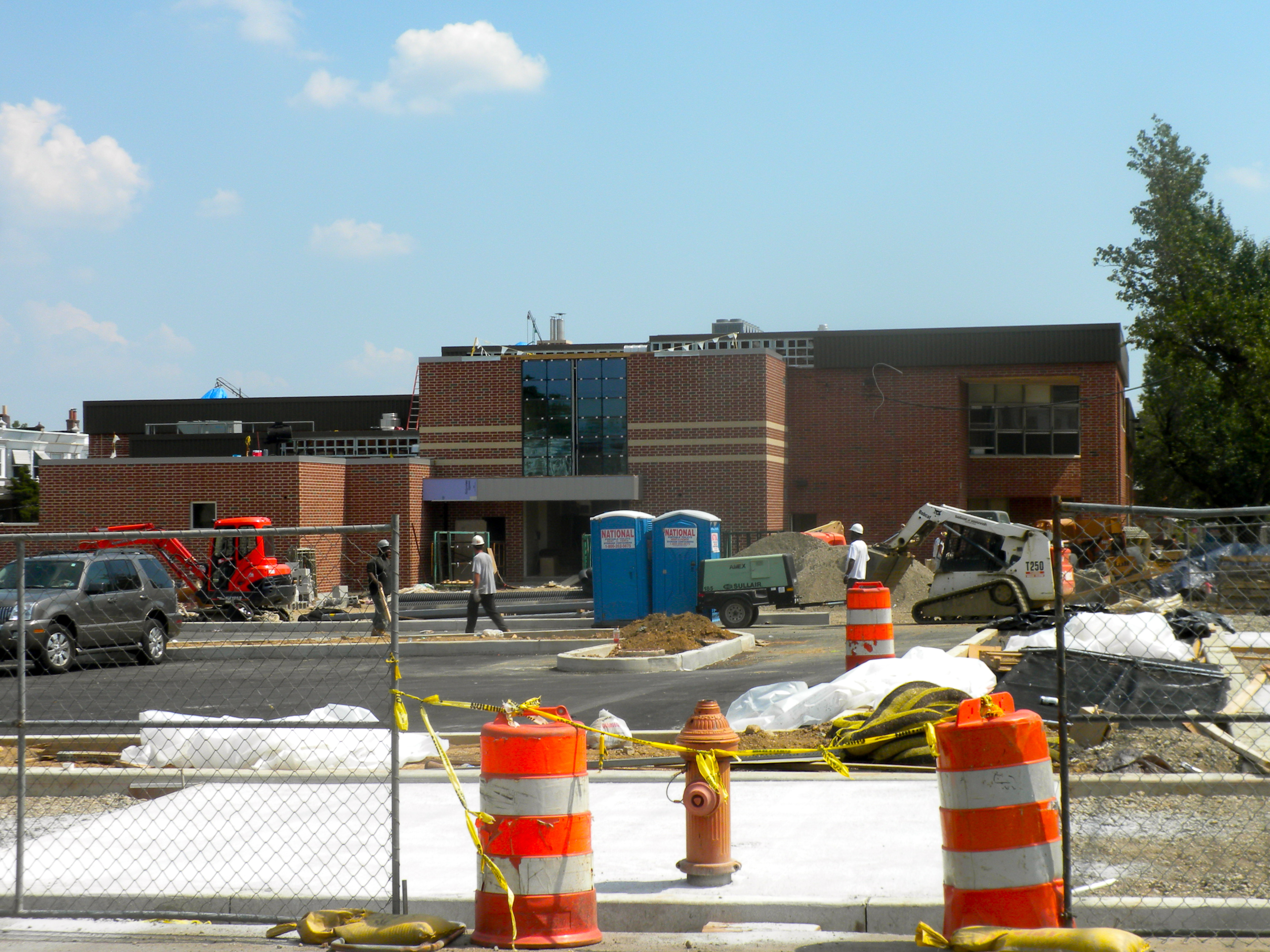
- William B. Hanna School site, June 2010

- Location within Philadelphia Location within Pennsylvania Location within the United States
- Location: 5720 Media St., Philadelphia, Pennsylvania
- Coordinates: 39°58′34″N 75°14′10″W
- Area: 2 acres (0.81 ha)
- Built: 1908–1909
- Built by: Sax & Abbott
- Architect: Henry deCoursey Richards
- Architectural style: Late Gothic Revival, Anglo-Gothic
- MPS: Philadelphia Public Schools TR
- NRHP reference No.: 86003288
- Added to NRHP: December 4, 1986

The William B. Hanna School was a historic, American school building in the Carroll Park neighborhood of Philadelphia, Pennsylvania.

It was added to the National Register of Historic Places in 1986.

== History and atchitectural features ==
Designed by Henry deCoursey Richards and built between 1908 and 1909, this historic structure was a three-story, reinforced concrete, brick-faced building that was created in the Late Gothic Revival style. It featured a central Gothic arched entry with grotesques, limestone trim, and a cornice with terra cotta trim. The school name was changed to Guion Bluford Elementary School in recognition of astronaut Guion Bluford, who attended Hanna School. The older portion of the school was demolished in 2010 and a replacement attached to its 1974 addition.
