= Thomas Durham School =

- U.S. National Register of Historic Places
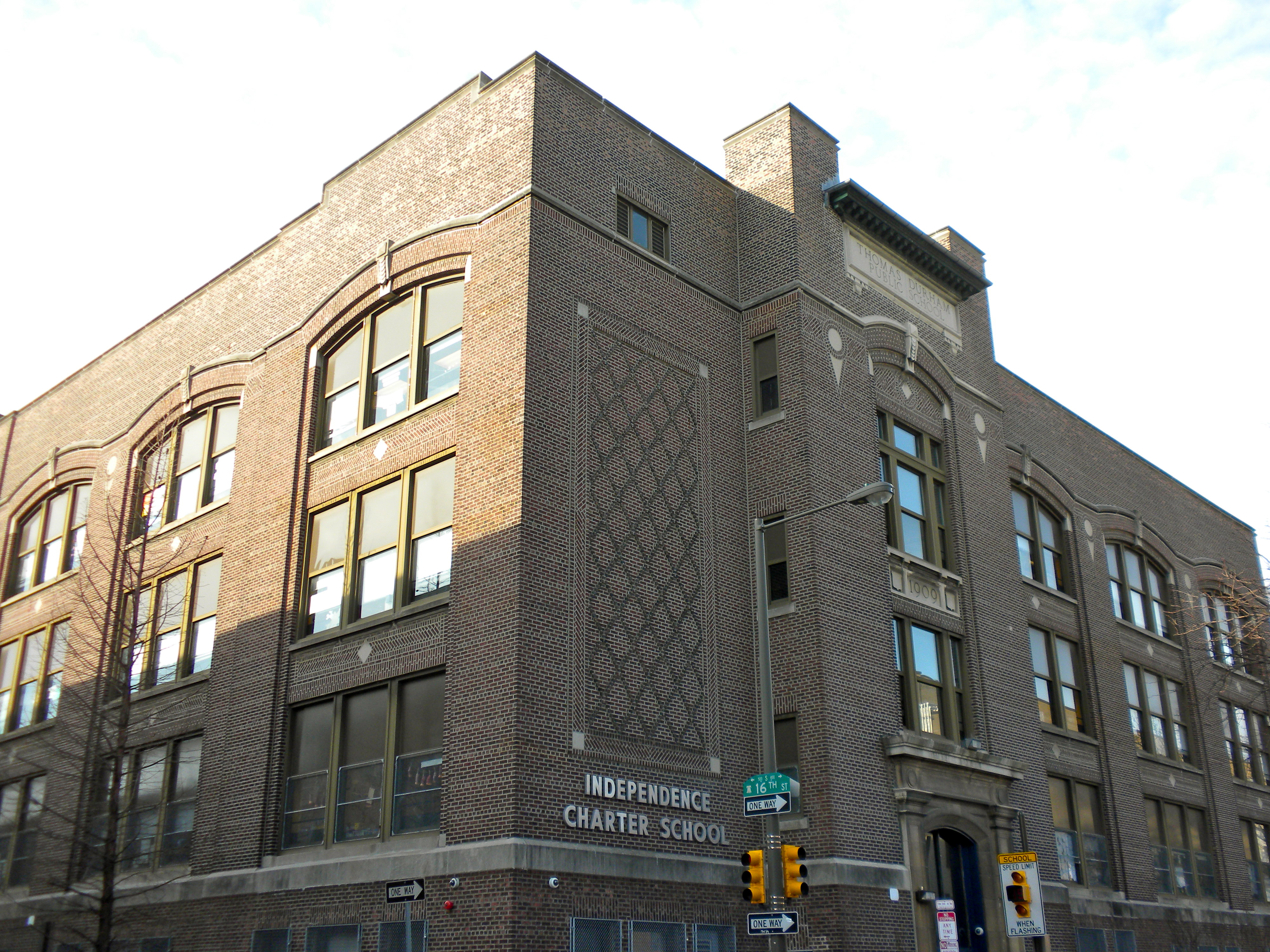

- Location within Pennsylvania
- Location: 1600 Lombard Street, Philadelphia, Pennsylvania
- Coordinates: 39°56′41″N 75°10′10″W
- Built: 1909
- Architect: Henry deCourcy Richards, Cramp & Co.
- Architectural style: Colonial Revival
- MPS: Philadelphia Public Schools TR
- NRHP reference No.: 88002265
- Added to NRHP: November 18, 1988

The Thomas Durham School is a historic school building that is located in Philadelphia, Pennsylvania, United States.

Listed on the U.S. National Register of Historic Places in 1988, it is now occupied by the Independence Charter School.

== History and architectural features ==
Built in 1909, this historic building was erected as part of a major construction program after the School District of Philadelphia was reorganized and consolidated in 1905.

Between 1906 and World War I, the district built forty-four elementary schools, one junior high school, and five senior high schools. The architect of this program, Henry deCourcy Richards, used a number of plans in different architectural styles, including Regency architecture, Colonial Revival, Georgian Revival, Classical Revival, Jacobethan, Mediterranean Revival, and Academic Gothic. In some cases, he built multiple schools from each pattern, but varied the ornamentation of individual buildings.

The Thomas Durham School was one of his Regency designs. One of his plainest designs for the district, it was also one of the cheapest to build, defining characteristics that may have been related to the building's location in a predominantly African-American neighborhood.

=== Present day ===
The Thomas Durham School building is now occupied by Independence Charter School.

== See also ==
- National Register of Historic Places listings in Center City, Philadelphia
- Tanner Duckrey
