= Hawthorne, Philadelphia =

Neighborhood in Philadelphia, US

Hawthorne
- Neighborhood of Philadelphia
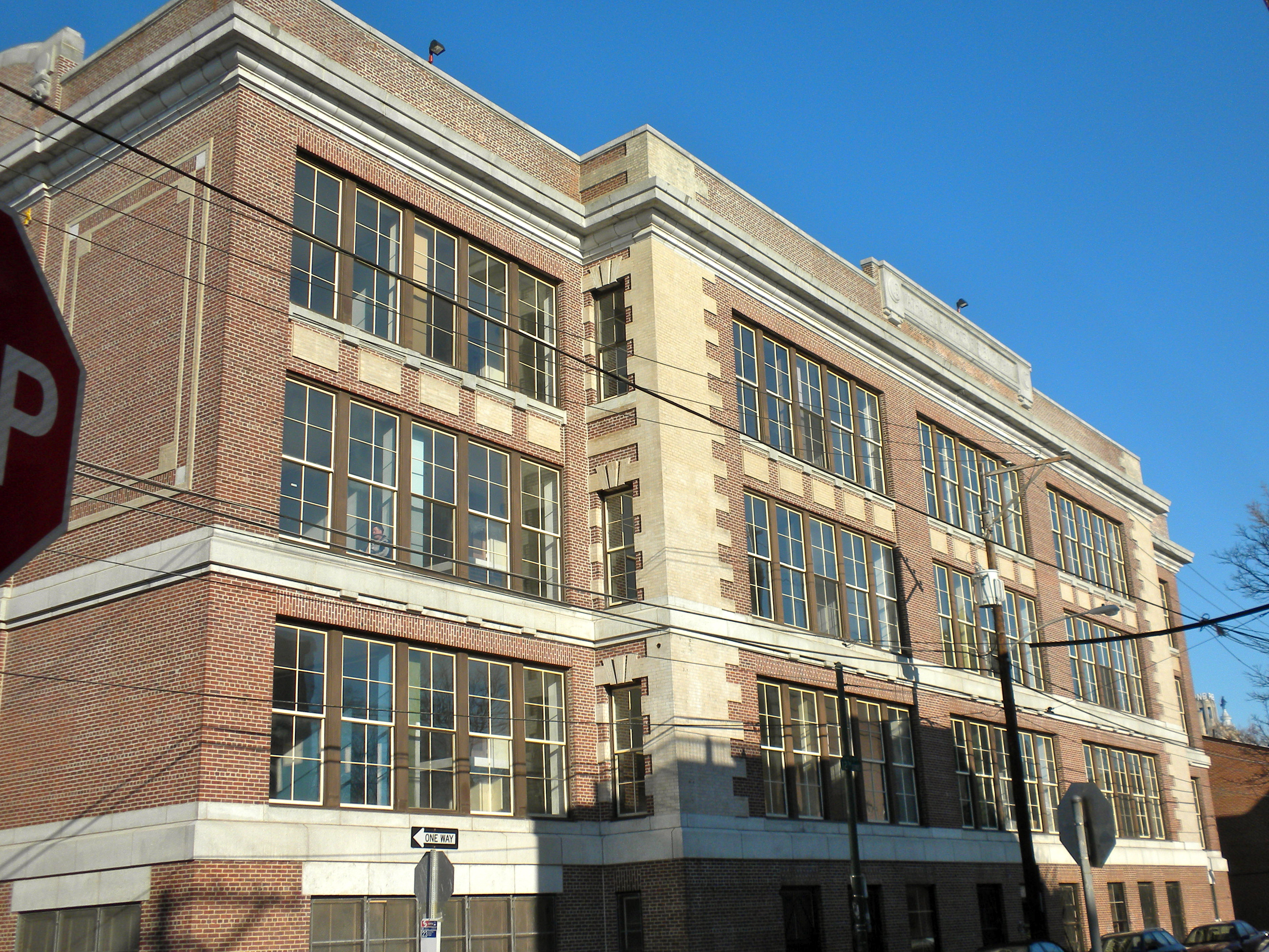
- Hawthorne Lofts, formerly Nathaniel Hawthorne School

- Location within Philadelphia
- Country: United States
- State: Pennsylvania
- County: Philadelphia
- City: Philadelphia
- ZIP code: 19147
- Area codes: 215, 267 and 445

Hawthorne is a neighborhood in the South Philadelphia section of Philadelphia, Pennsylvania, United States. It is located between Broad Street and 11th Street, and extends from South Street to Washington Avenue.

== Background ==
The most prominent landmark in the neighborhood was Martin Luther King Jr. Plaza, a public housing high-rise complex at 13th and Fitzwater Street, originally called Hawthorne Square. The four MLK towers were imploded on October 17, 1999, and have been slowly replaced with a mix of low-rise public housing, based on New Urbanism ideas, thanks to the HOPE VI program.

Hawthorne is in transition, one of the few neighborhoods contiguous to Center City, Philadelphia that had been left relatively untouched by major upscale development. It is also sandwiched between gentrifying neighborhoods: Southwest Center City is to its west and Bella Vista is to its east.

Much of Hawthorne is currently being renovated. Old homes are being renovated with only the exterior remaining. Other properties that were commercial are being (or have been) demolished and new town homes have replaced them.

Approximately 10 new homes a year have been constructed in the past two years; the current tax abatement and homes with parking are also attracting new residents.

The Nathaniel Hawthorne elementary school was converted into condominiums in 2011.

The High School for the Creative and Performing Arts is also located in Hawthorne, in the former Ridgway Library. The ornate building dates to 1878 and is modeled after the Parthenon, and is the former home of the Library Company of Philadelphia.

== History ==
According to Sandra Robinson, Hawthorne Square was originally the name given to the area between roughly Lombard and Bainbridge. A popular African American nightlife spot for jazz musicians, vices, and rowdy bars, it was also a site of poverty and street crime. When the city made an effort to revitalize Society Hill and the neighborhood now called Washington Square West, the community of Hawthorne Square was essentially pushed to the south and west, creating "Hawthorne" with its current boundaries.

The Washington Avenue Historic District, Bartlett School, and Nathaniel Hawthorne School are listed on the National Register of Historic Places.

== Education ==
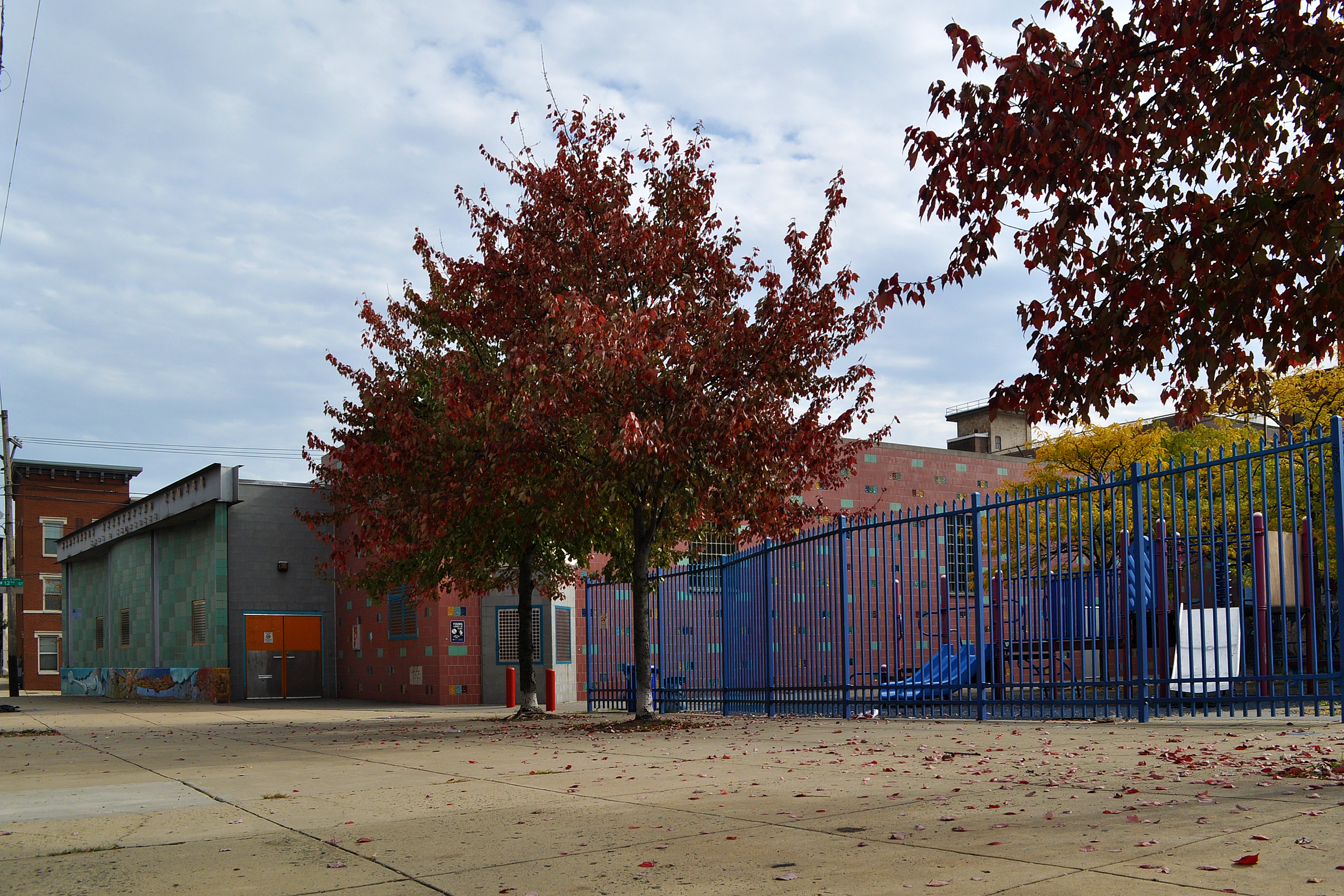
Hawthorne Cultural Center, 1200 Carpenter St.

The School District of Philadelphia operates public schools, including Academy at Palumbo, formally known as Barlett School, or Frank C. Palumbo Junior High School.

The Free Library of Philadelphia operates the Charles Santore Branch (formerly Southwark Branch), serving Bella Vista.
