= Julia Ward Howe School =

- U.S. National Register of Historic Places
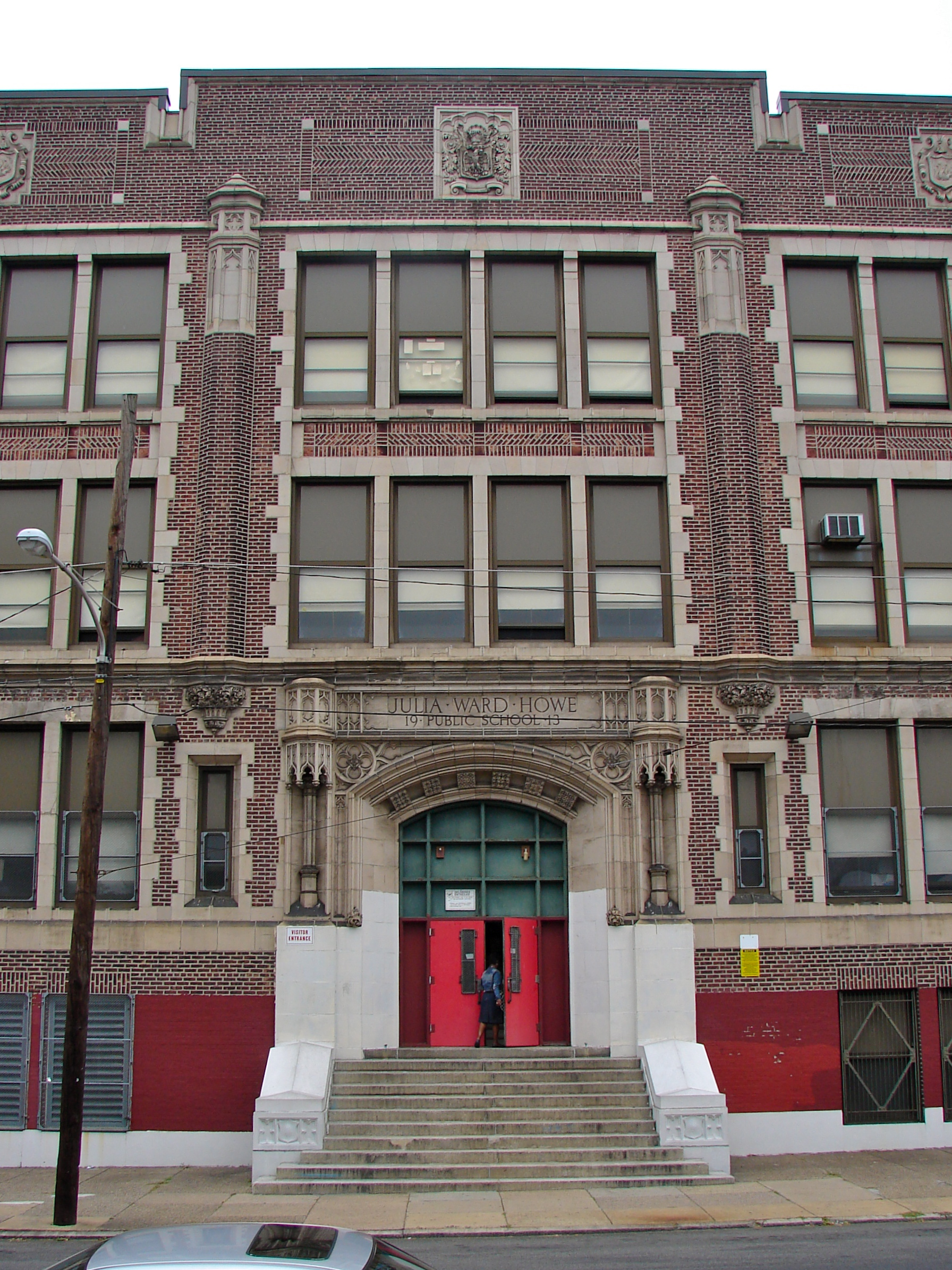
- Julia Ward Howe School entrance, September 2010

- Location within Philadelphia Location within Pennsylvania Location within the United States
- Location: 5800 N. 13th St., Philadelphia, Pennsylvania
- Coordinates: 40°02′29″N 75°08′32″W
- Area: 1.1 acres (0.45 ha)
- Built: 1913–1914
- Built by: Thomas Reilly
- Architect: Henry deCourcy Richards
- Architectural style: Tudor Revival
- MPS: Philadelphia Public Schools TR
- NRHP reference No.: 88002284
- Added to NRHP: November 18, 1988

The Julia Ward Howe School, also known as the Julia Ward Howe Academics Plus Elementary School, is a historic American school that is located in the Fern Rock neighborhood of Philadelphia, Pennsylvania. It is part of the School District of Philadelphia.

The building was added to the National Register of Historic Places in 1988.

== History and architectural features ==
This building was designed by Henry deCourcy Richards and built between 1913 and 1914. It is a three-story, five-bay, brick building that was created in the Tudor Revival style. It features a central limestone entrance and terra cotta trim and decorative panels. The school was named for abolitionist and author Julia Ward Howe (1819-1910).
