= Tanner Duckrey =

Superintendent of the Philadelphia school district

Tanner G. Duckrey was the first African American school superintendent in the Philadelphia school district. An elementary school is named for him.

He gave a lecture at Delaware State University. He made "great contributions" to African American education according to one account. He also served as principal of Barratt Evening School.

He served as principal of the Durham School. He also served as principal of Dunbar Elementary School.

In 1943, he was appointed as Assistant to the Board of Superintendents and tasked with dealing with the "problems facing Negro students in Philadelphia Public Schools".
