= Charles W. Henry School =

- Charles Wolcott Henry School
- U.S. National Register of Historic Places
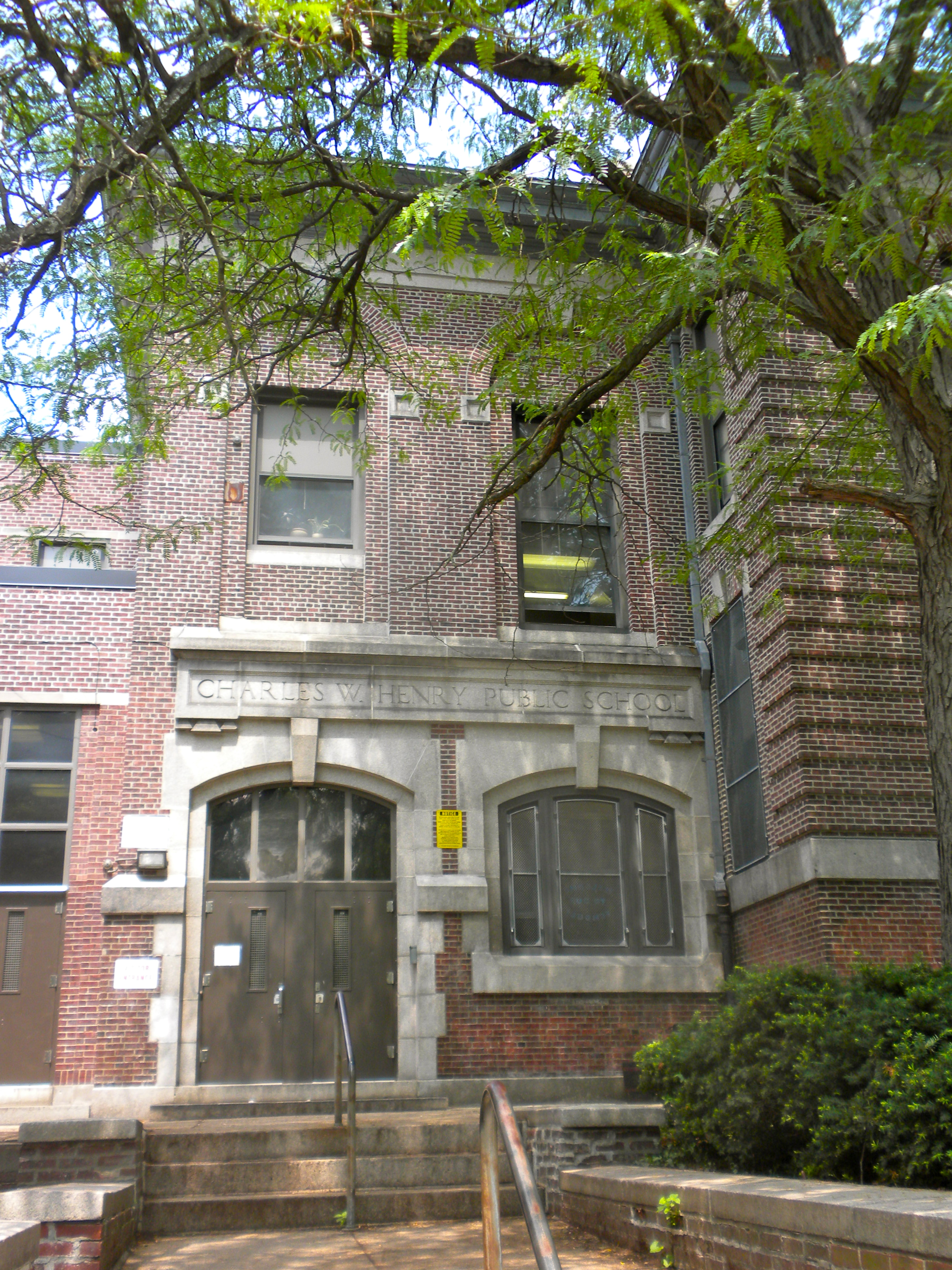
- Charles Wolcott Henry School, June 2010

- Location within Philadelphia Location within Pennsylvania Location within the United States
- Location: 601 Carpenter Ln., Philadelphia, Pennsylvania
- Coordinates: 40.0462°N 75.1965°W
- Area: 2.5 acres (1.0 ha)
- Built: 1906–1908
- Built by: Cramp & Co.
- Architect: Henry deCourcy Richards
- Architectural style: Colonial Revival
- MPS: Philadelphia Public Schools TR
- NRHP reference No.: 88002279
- Added to NRHP: November 18, 1988

Charles W. Henry School is a historic school located at 601 Carpenter Lane (at Greene Street) in the Mount Airy neighborhood of Philadelphia, Pennsylvania. It is part of the School District of Philadelphia. The building was designed by Henry deCourcy Richards and built by Cramp & Co. in 1906–1908. It is a two-story, 20 bay, red brick building in the Colonial Revival-style. Additions were built in 1949–1950 and 1968. It features arched entryways and limestone trim. It was the scene of a bombing during its construction in 1906.

The building was added to the National Register of Historic Places in 1988.
