= Carroll Park, Philadelphia =

Carroll Park
- Neighborhood of Philadelphia
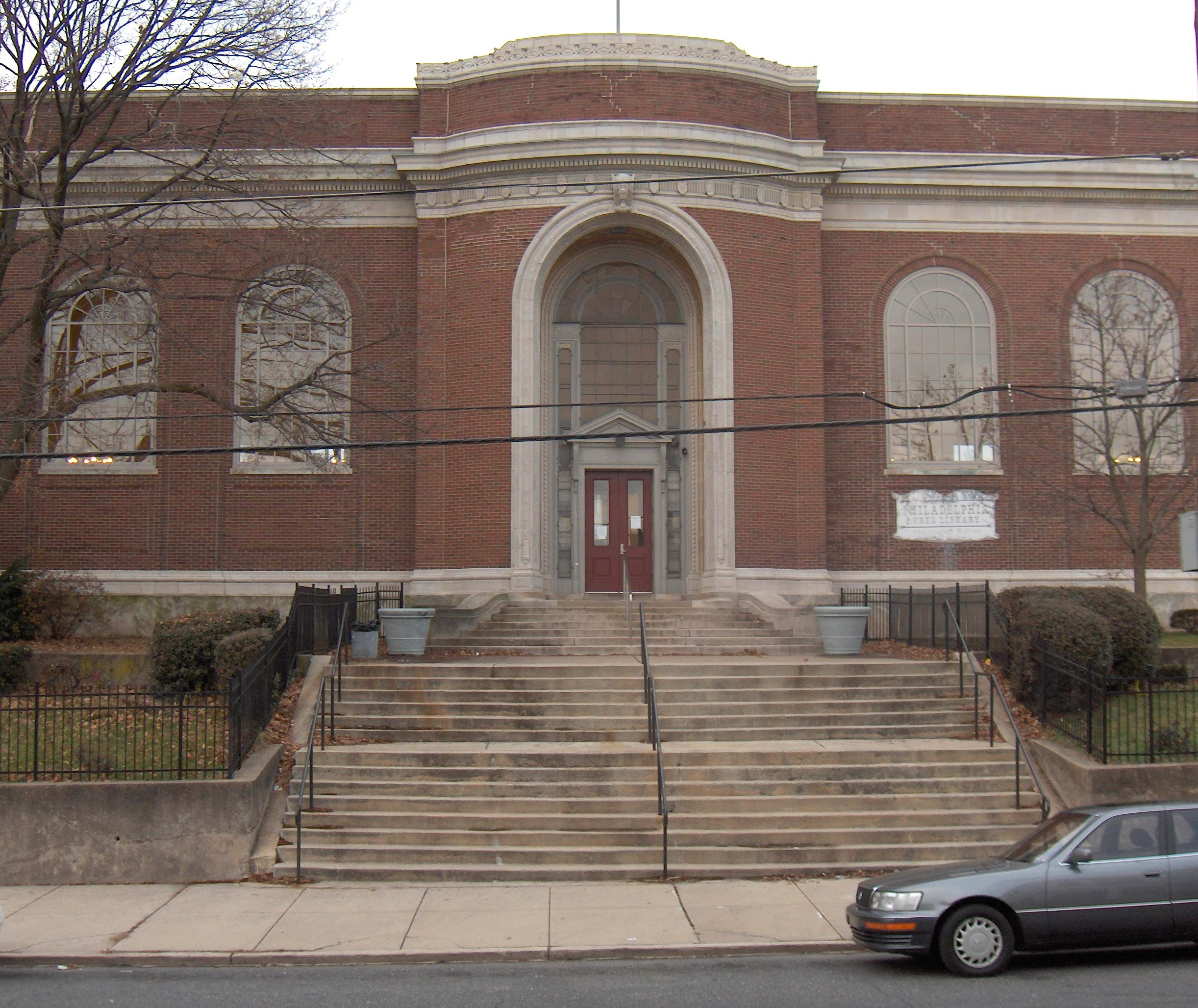
- Haddington Branch Library in Carroll Park

- Location within Philadelphia
- Country: United States
- State: Pennsylvania
- County: Philadelphia
- City: Philadelphia
- Area codes: 215, 267, and 445

Carroll Park is a neighborhood in West Philadelphia, Pennsylvania, United States. It is bounded by Lansdowne Avenue to the north, West Girard Avenue to the south, North 63rd Street to the west, and North 52nd Street to the east. Along major streets of the neighborhood, the Carroll Park Community Council, Inc. has placed banners that say “Carroll Park: Where our neighbors become friends.” The 10 trolley runs along Lansdowne Avenue and the 15 trolley runs along Girard Avenue. There is a park by the name of Carroll Park between North 59th and North 58th Streets and West Thompson Street and West Girard Avenue. Carroll Park’s residents are primarily working-class and lower-income African-Americans.

== Schools and libraries ==
The School District of Philadelphia operates the local public schools. Two charter schools and one parochial school are located in the neighborhood. The charter schools are the Universal Bluford Charter School (formerly Guion S. Bluford School), serving grades K through 6, and the Mastery Charter School – Shoemaker Campus, serving grades 7 and 8. St. Rose of Lima School is a Roman Catholic parochial school serving grades pre-K through 8.

The William Shoemaker Junior High School and the former William B. Hanna School are listed on the National Register of Historic Places.

The Free Library of Philadelphia Haddington Branch serves Carroll Park.
