= Academy at Palumbo =

- U.S. National Register of Historic Places
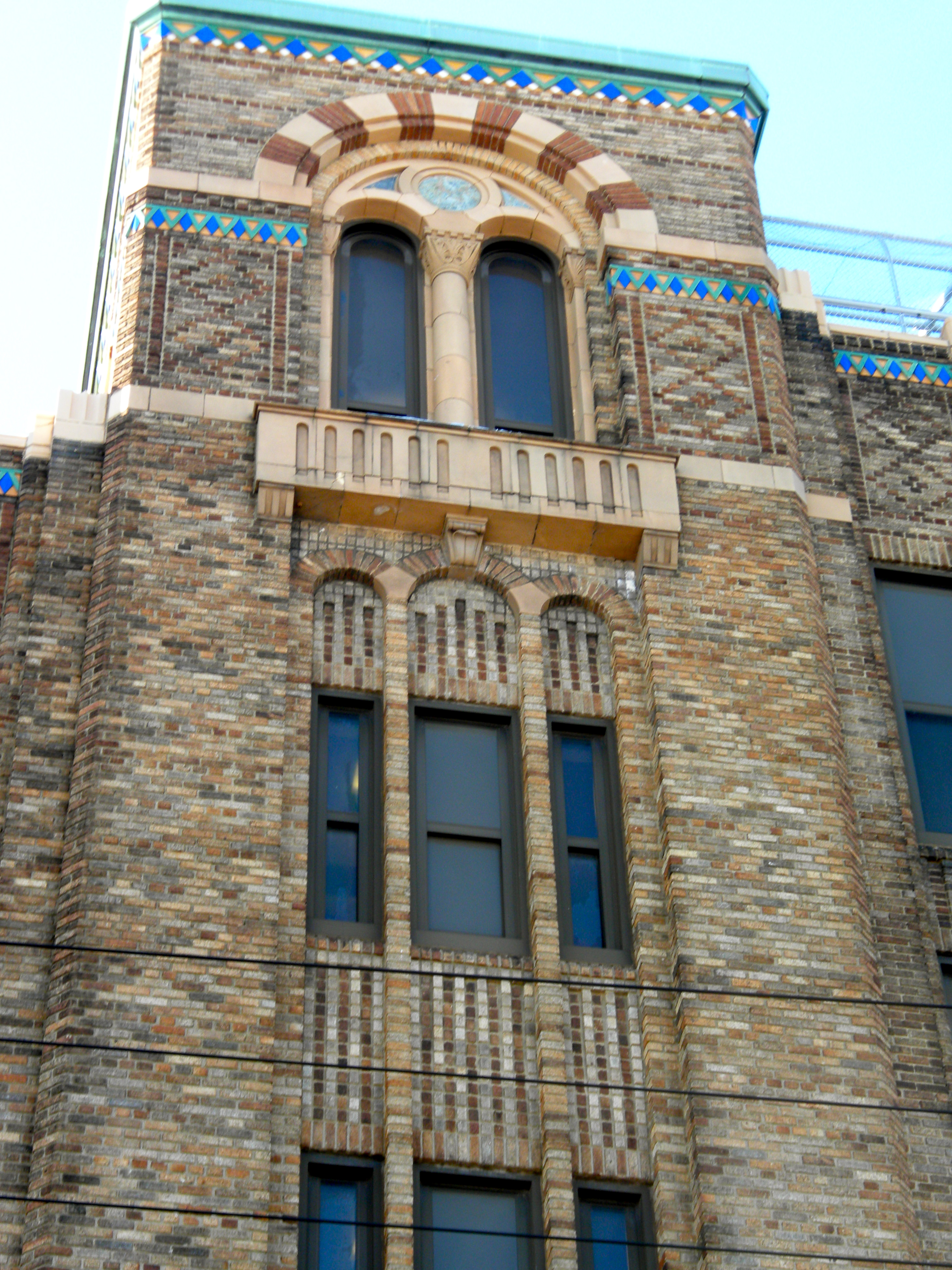
- Bartlett School, February 2010

- Location within Philadelphia Location within Pennsylvania Location within the United States
- Location: 1100 Catharine St., Philadelphia, Pennsylvania, U.S.
- Coordinates: 39.9401°N 75.1617°W
- Area: 3 acres (1.2 ha)
- Built: 1930
- Architect: Irwin T. Catharine
- Architectural style: Art Deco
- Website: palumbo.philasd.org
- MPS: Philadelphia Public Schools TR
- NRHP reference No.: 86003315
- Added to NRHP: December 4, 1986

The Academy at Palumbo, formerly known as Bartlett School and Frank C. Palumbo Junior High School, is a historic school building located in the Bella Vista neighborhood of Philadelphia, Pennsylvania, United States. It is part of the School District of Philadelphia. The building was designed by Irwin T. Catharine and built in 1930. It is a brick building with terra cotta ornament in the Art Deco-style.

The Academy at Palumbo was originally an elementary school in 1930, before converting to a high school on September 12, 2006.

The mission of The Academy at Palumbo is to academically prepare students through critical thinking, problem solving, and technological skills. This high school aims to protect and serve their students regardless of race, color, or gender.

Since September 2006, the school has operated as a college preparatory magnet high school within the School District of Philadelphia. In 2010, 1750 students applied for admission, with 700 accepted and 190 matriculating. About 49% of the students are African-American. 91% of graduates began studying at four-year colleges or universities, 8% went to two-year colleges, and 1% began serving in the military.

The Academy at Palumbo offers the following extracurricular activities and sports teams:

- Asian Culture Club • Chaotic Step Team • Chess Club • Community Service Club • Debate/Speech Club • Drama Club • Fiber Arts Club • Griffin Ambassadors • GSA • Jazz Band • Journalism • Math Team • Multicultural Club • Palumbo and Villanova Exchange • Poetry Club • Robotics • Rock Band • Student Government • Students Run Philly Style
- Badminton • Baseball • Basketball—Boys’ and Girls’ • Crew • Cross-Country • Football • Golf • Lacrosse—Boys’ and Girls’ • Soccer—Boys’ and Girls’ • Softball • Swimming • Track and Field—Boys’ and Girls’ • Volleyball—Boys’ and Girls’ • Wrestling

The school also provides an opportunity to enroll in a dual enrollment program with Arcadia University.

The women's volleyball team had success in 2019.

The building was added to the National Register of Historic Places in 1986.

The RoboGriffins, the school's robotics team, was the World Champion of CoderZ Pro League 2020–2021.

== See also ==
- List of schools of the School District of Philadelphia

== Gallery ==
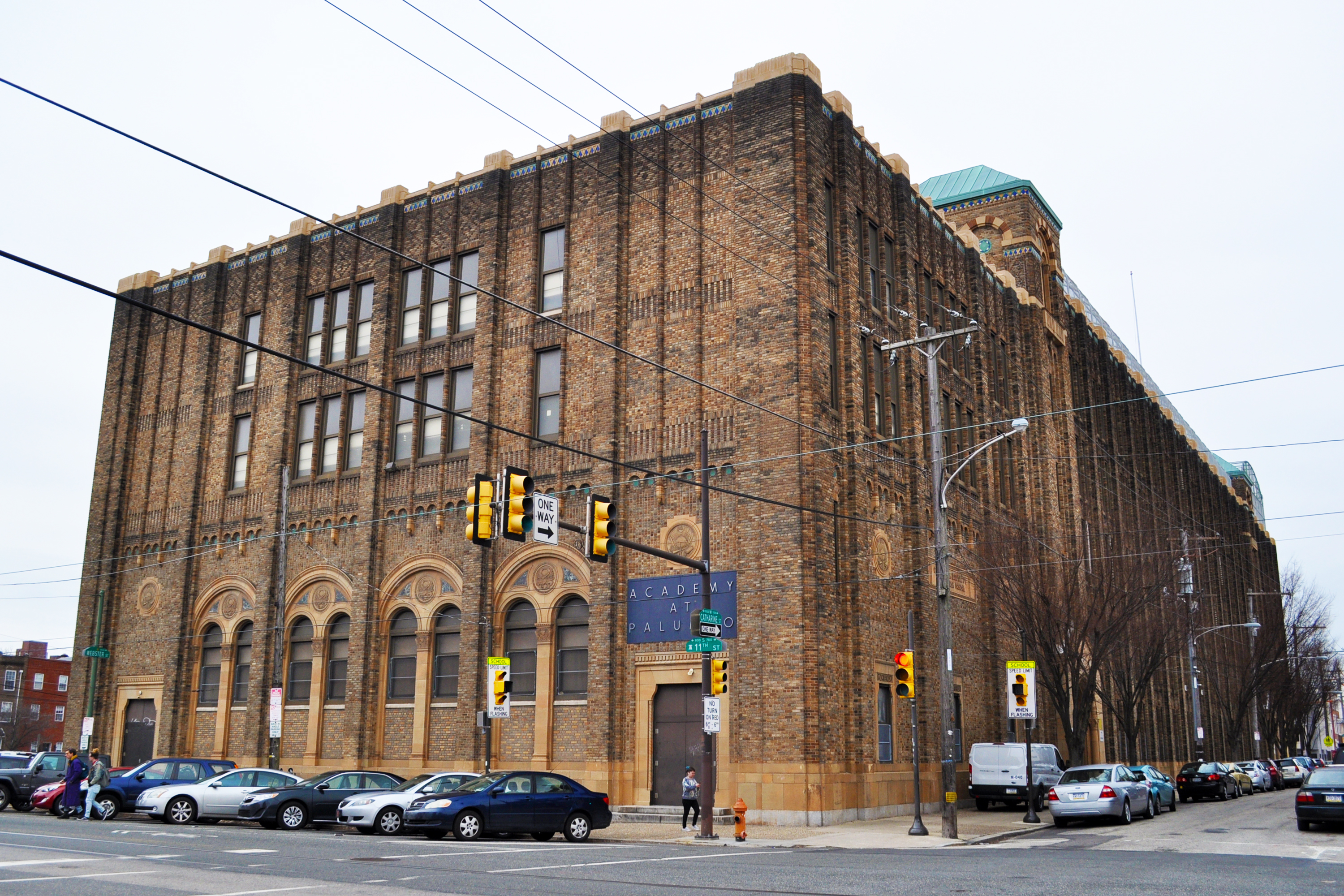

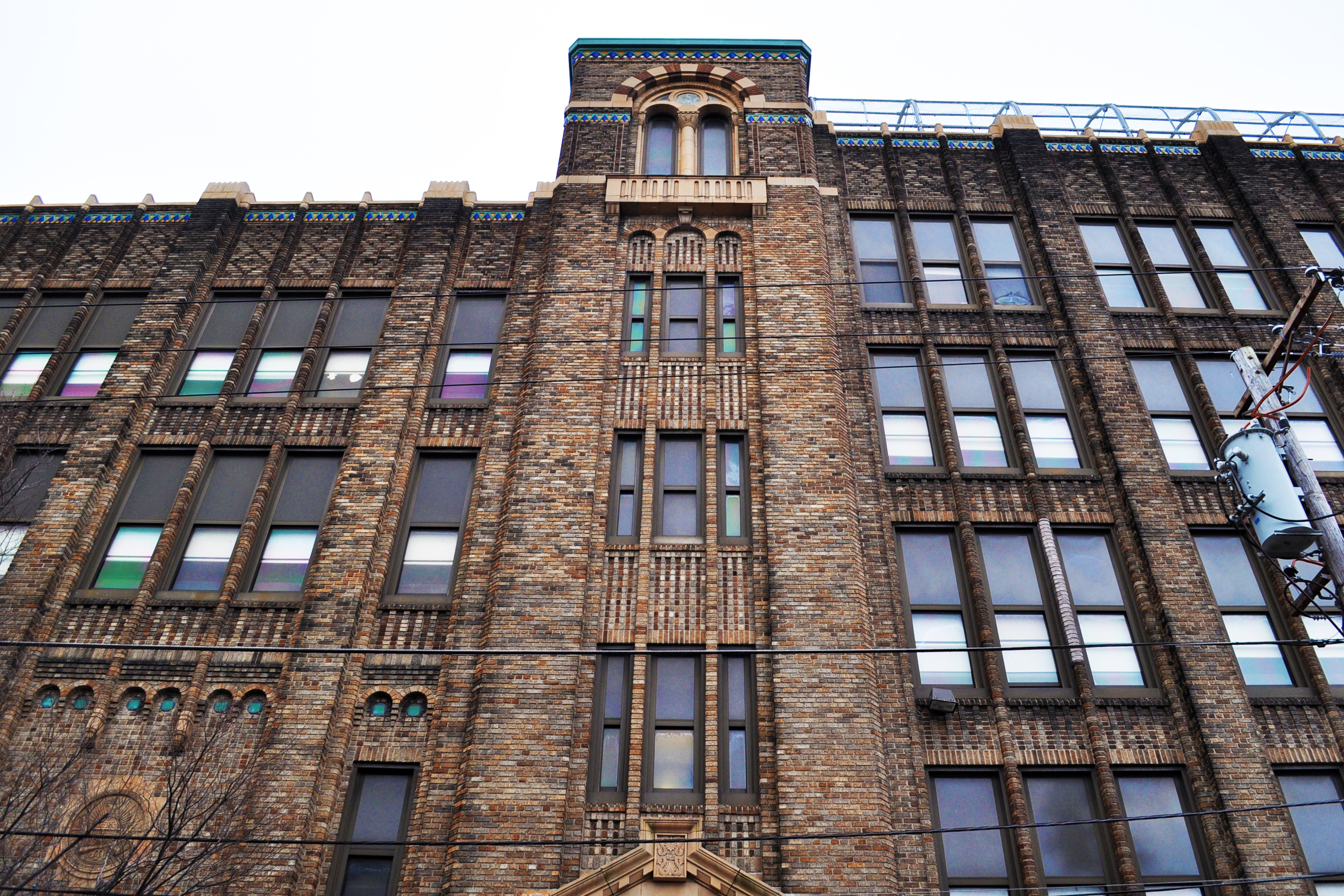

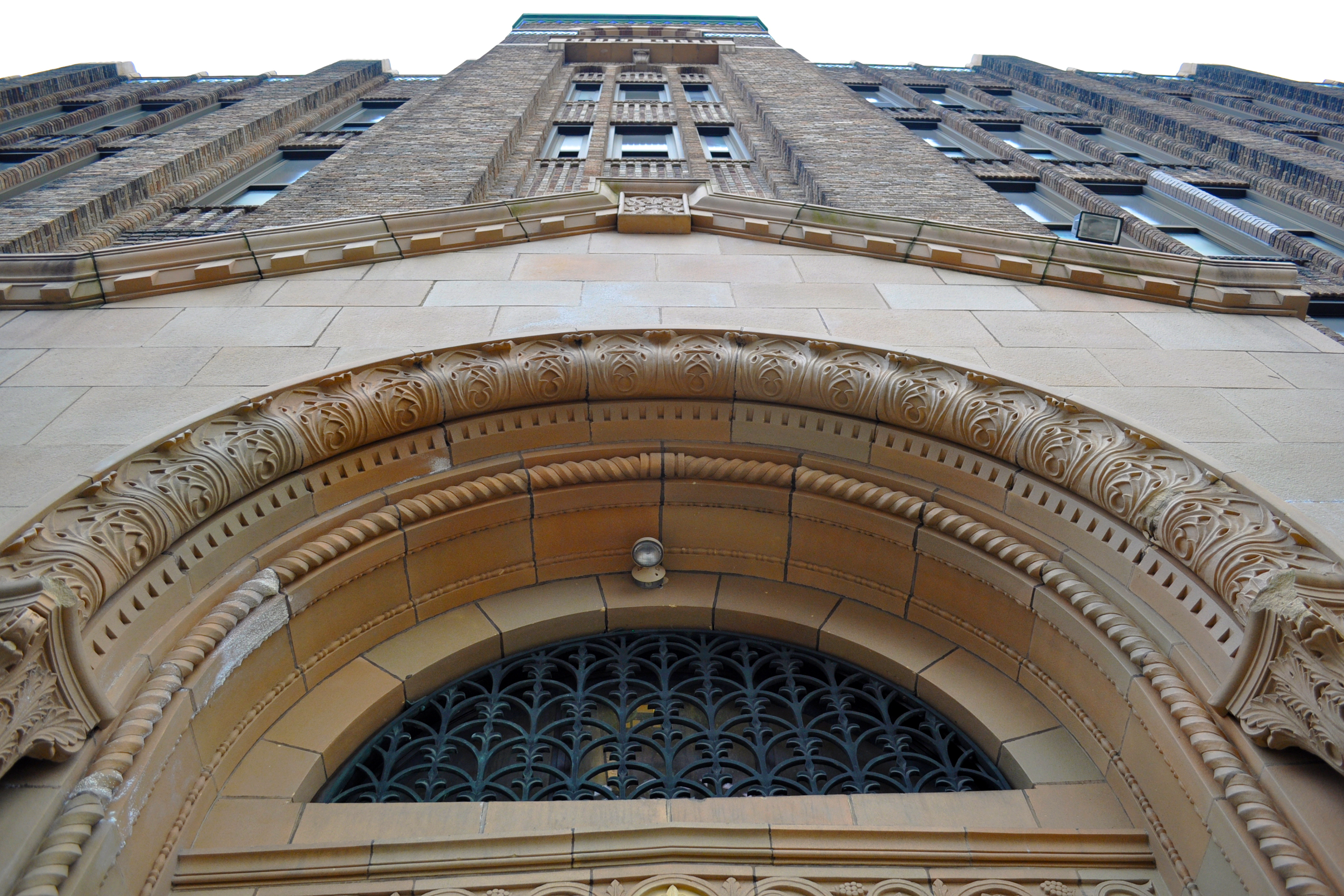

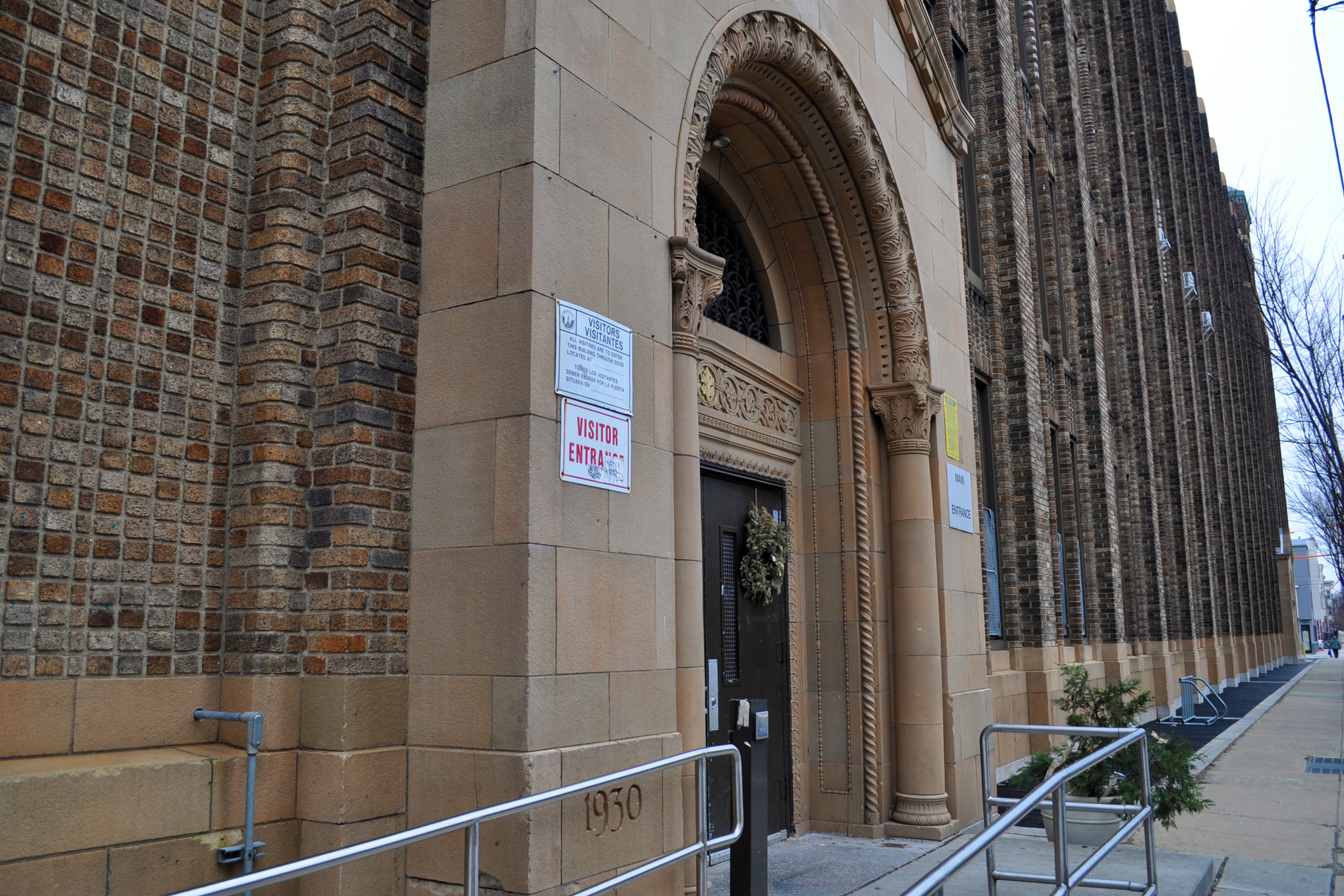

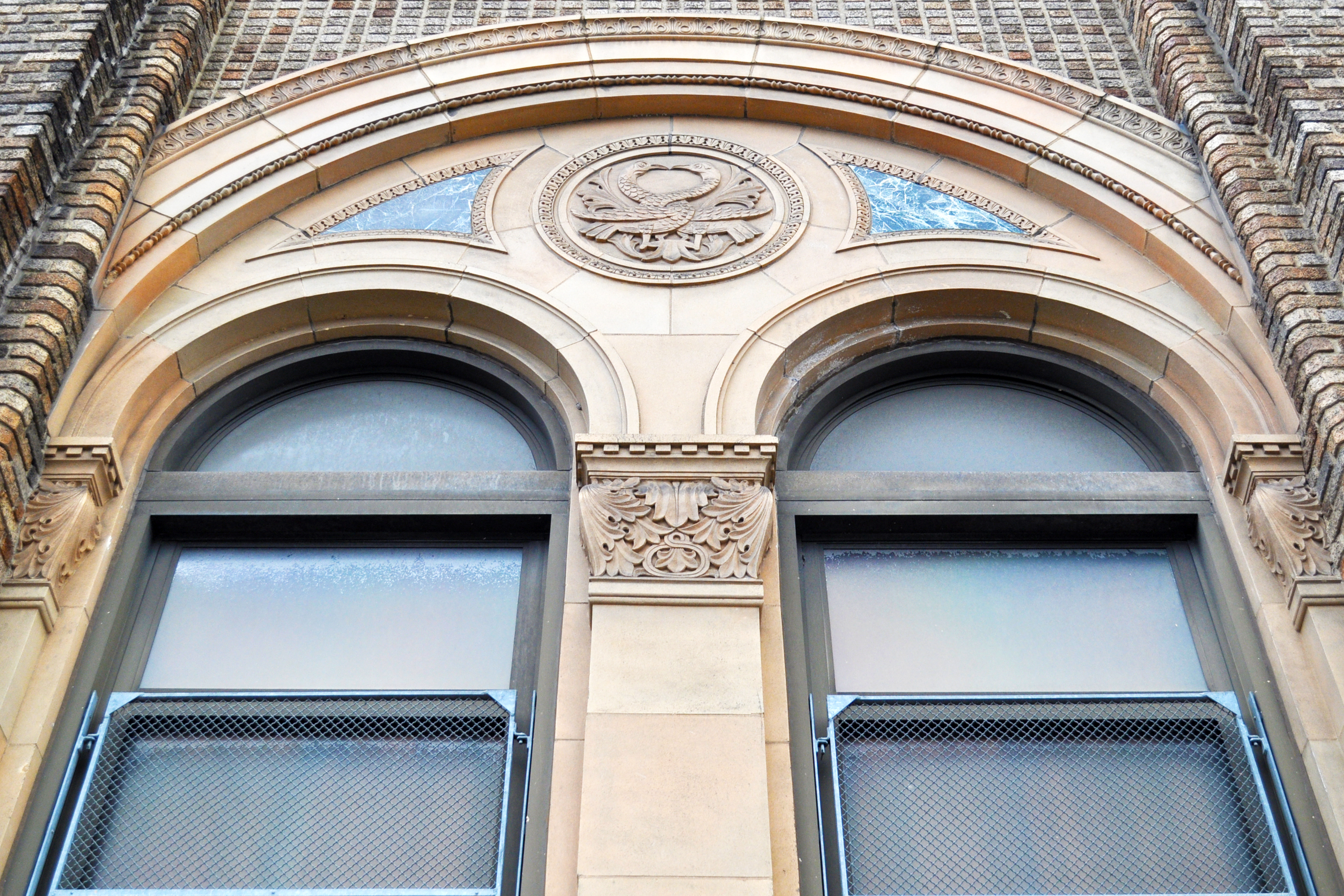

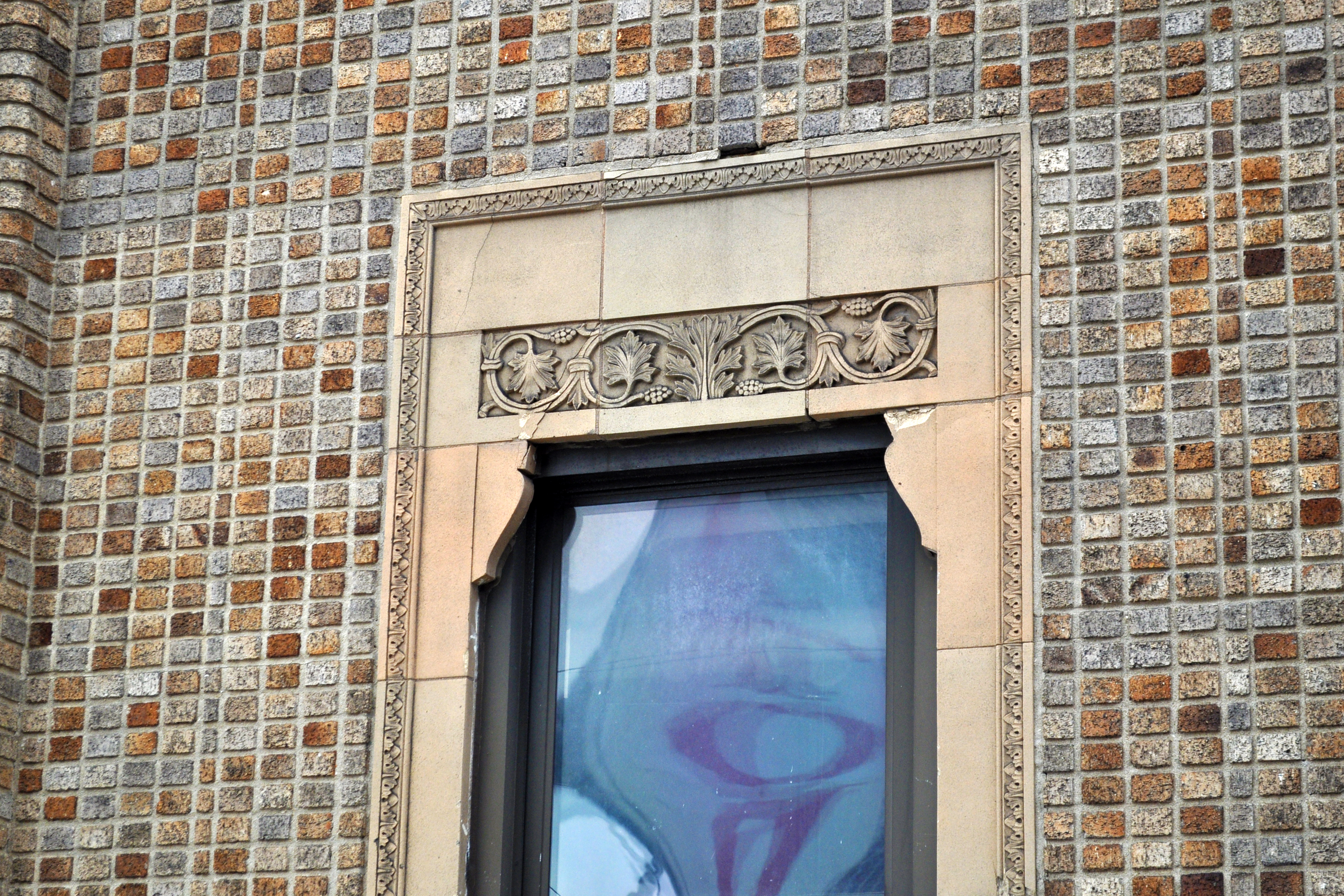

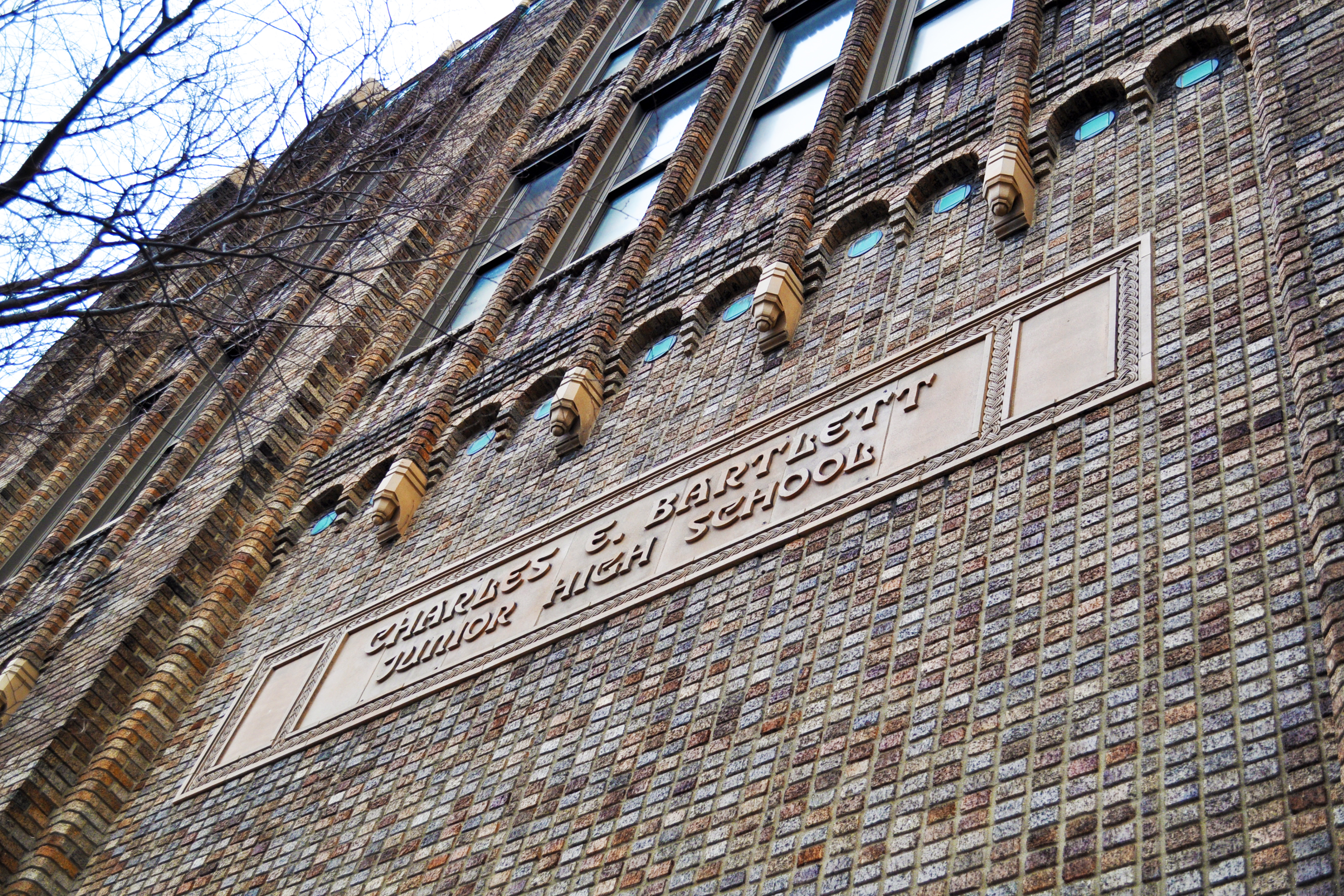
