= Mastery Charter School Shoemaker Campus =

- William Shoemaker Junior High School
- U.S. National Register of Historic Places
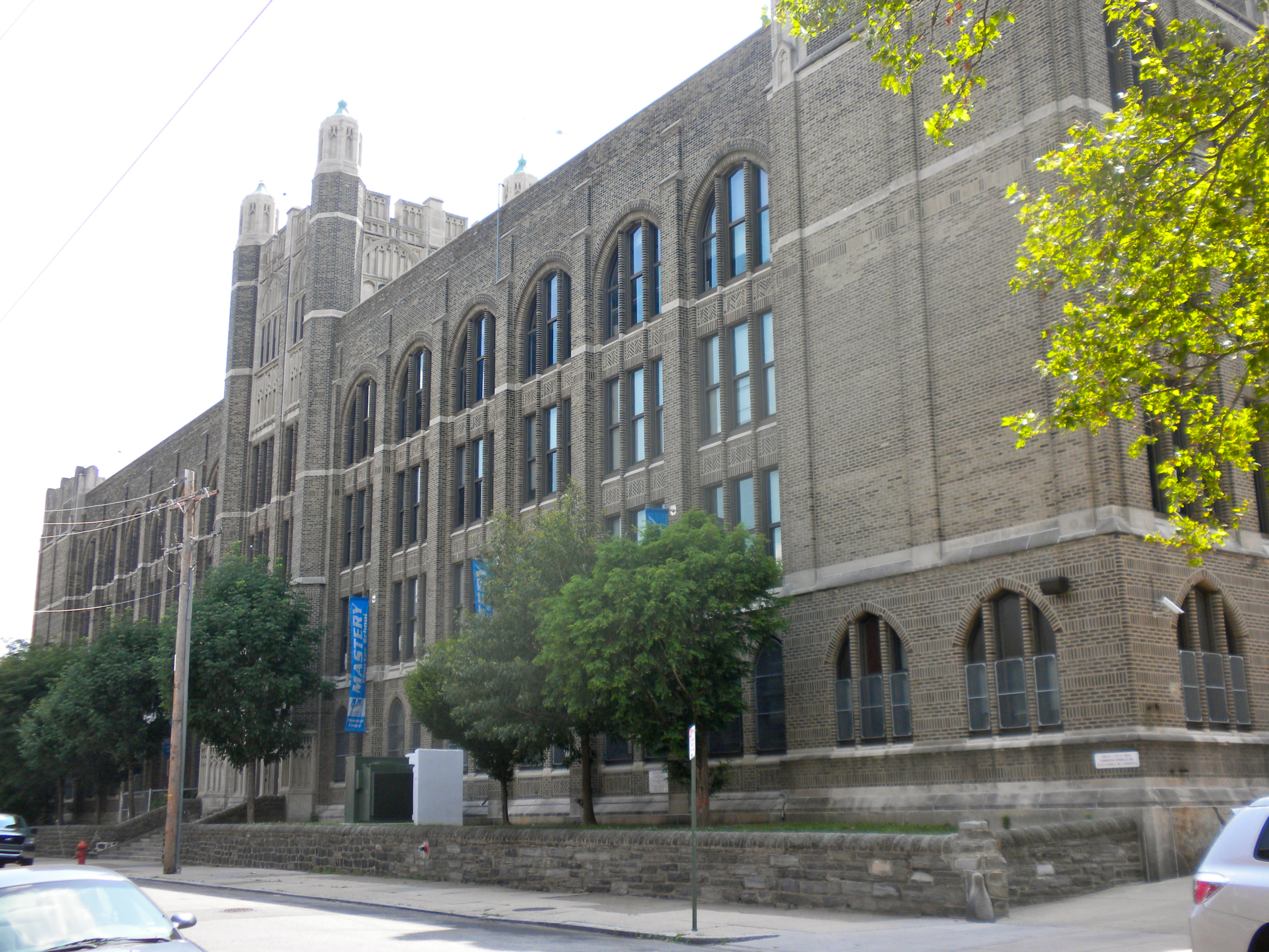
- William Shoemaker Junior High School, June 2010

- Location within Philadelphia Location within Pennsylvania Location within the United States
- Location: 5301 Media St., Philadelphia, Pennsylvania
- Coordinates: 39.9761°N 75.2283°W
- Area: 3 acres (1.2 ha)
- Built: 1925
- Architect: Irwin T. Catharine
- Architectural style: Late Gothic Revival, Academic Gothic
- MPS: Philadelphia Public Schools TR
- NRHP reference No.: 86003328
- Added to NRHP: December 4, 1986

The Mastery Charter School Shoemaker Campus, formerly the William Shoemaker Junior High School, is a historic, American high school/middle school that is located in the Carroll Park neighborhood of Philadelphia, Pennsylvania. It is currently a charter school run by Mastery Charter Schools.

NBA center Wilt Chamberlain attended the school.

== History and architectural features ==
The building was designed by Irwin T. Catharine and built in 1925. It is a four-story, fourteen-bay, reinforced concrete, yellow brick-faced building. Designed in the Late Gothic Revival style, it features a central projecting entrance bay with Gothic arched door, thin brick piers with decorative caps, and brick panels in a herringbone pattern.

The building was added to the National Register of Historic Places in 1986.
