= Fern Rock, Philadelphia =

Fern Rock
- Neighborhood of Philadelphia
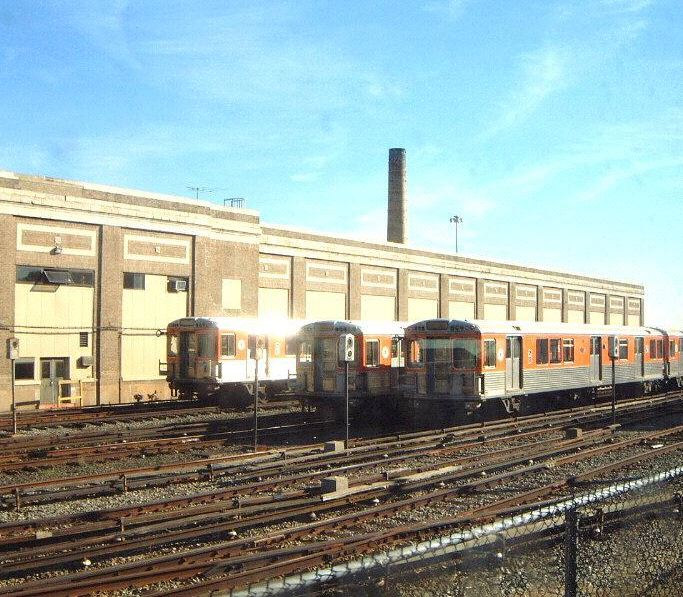
- Fern Rock Transit Center in August 2005

- Location within Philadelphia
- Country: United States
- State: Pennsylvania
- County: Philadelphia
- City: Philadelphia
- Area codes: 215, 267 and 445

Fern Rock is a neighborhood in the upper North Philadelphia section of Philadelphia, Pennsylvania, United States, bounded by Olney to the east, Ogontz to the west, Logan to the south, and East Oak Lane to the north. It is approximately situated between Broad Street, Tabor Road, 7th Street, Godfrey Avenue and Fisher Park. Fern Rock borders Ogontz at Broad Street, Logan at Olney Avenue, East Oak Lane at Godfrey Avenue, and Olney at the train tracks.

The northern terminus of the Broad Street Line subway is located in Fern Rock at the Fern Rock Transportation Center. Three SEPTA Regional Rail lines also run through this station.

The area is a mix of 1920s-style row homes, a few high-rise apartment buildings near York and Chelten, some older twins and single homes, especially near 13th St and Spencer St, formerly known as Green Lane, along with various commercial strips along Broad Street, Olney Avenue in and around Broad Street, and the 5700-5900 block of Old York Road.

The neighborhood is named after the ancestral estate of Elisha Kent Kane, a renowned arctic explorer and naval surgeon from Philadelphia.

== Demographics ==
The neighborhood is a fairly stable, predominantly Black-American area.

== Education ==
The Julia Ward Howe School, Pennsylvania College of Optometry (Eye Institute), and Community College of Philadelphia (Northwest Center) are located in the Fern Rock neighborhood.
