= Henry Longfellow School =

- U.S. National Register of Historic Places
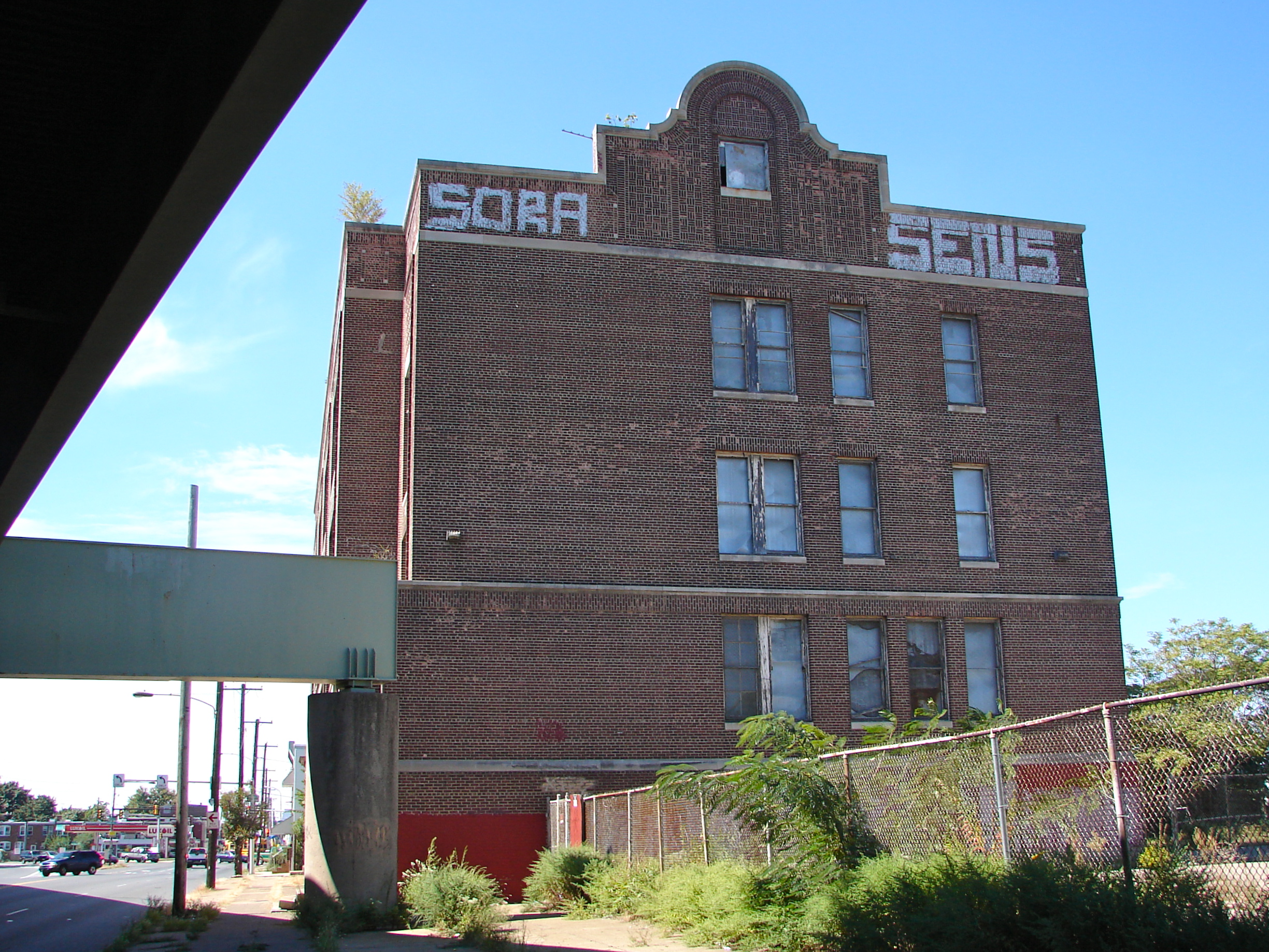
- Henry Longfellow School, September 2010

- Location within Philadelphia Location within Pennsylvania Location within the United States
- Location: 5004–5098 Tacony St., Philadelphia, Pennsylvania
- Coordinates: 40°00′31″N 75°04′17″W
- Area: 1.4 acres (0.57 ha)
- Built: 1915
- Built by: Thomas Reilly
- Architect: Henry deCourcy Richards
- Architectural style: Classical Revival, Utilitarian
- MPS: Philadelphia Public Schools TR
- NRHP reference No.: 88002294
- Added to NRHP: November 18, 1988

The Henry Longfellow School was a historic school building in the Bridesburg neighborhood of Philadelphia, Pennsylvania.

Added to the National Register of Historic Places in 1988, it was demolished on August 17, 2015, as part of the widening of Interstate 95 near Northeast Philadelphia.

== History and architectural features ==
Designed by Henry deCourcy Richards, this historic structure was built in 1915. It was a three-story, six-bay, brick building which was erected on a raised basement and designed in the Classical Revival style. It featured a stone cornice and beltcourse and a brick parapet. The school was named for poet Henry Wadsworth Longfellow.

Demolition of the school commenced on August 17, 2015, in conjunction with the plans to rebuild and widen Interstate 95 as part of the ongoing reconstruction of the Interstate in Northeast Philadelphia.
