= Franklin Learning Center =

- Franklin Learning Center (formerly Williams Penn High School for Girls)
- U.S. National Register of Historic Places
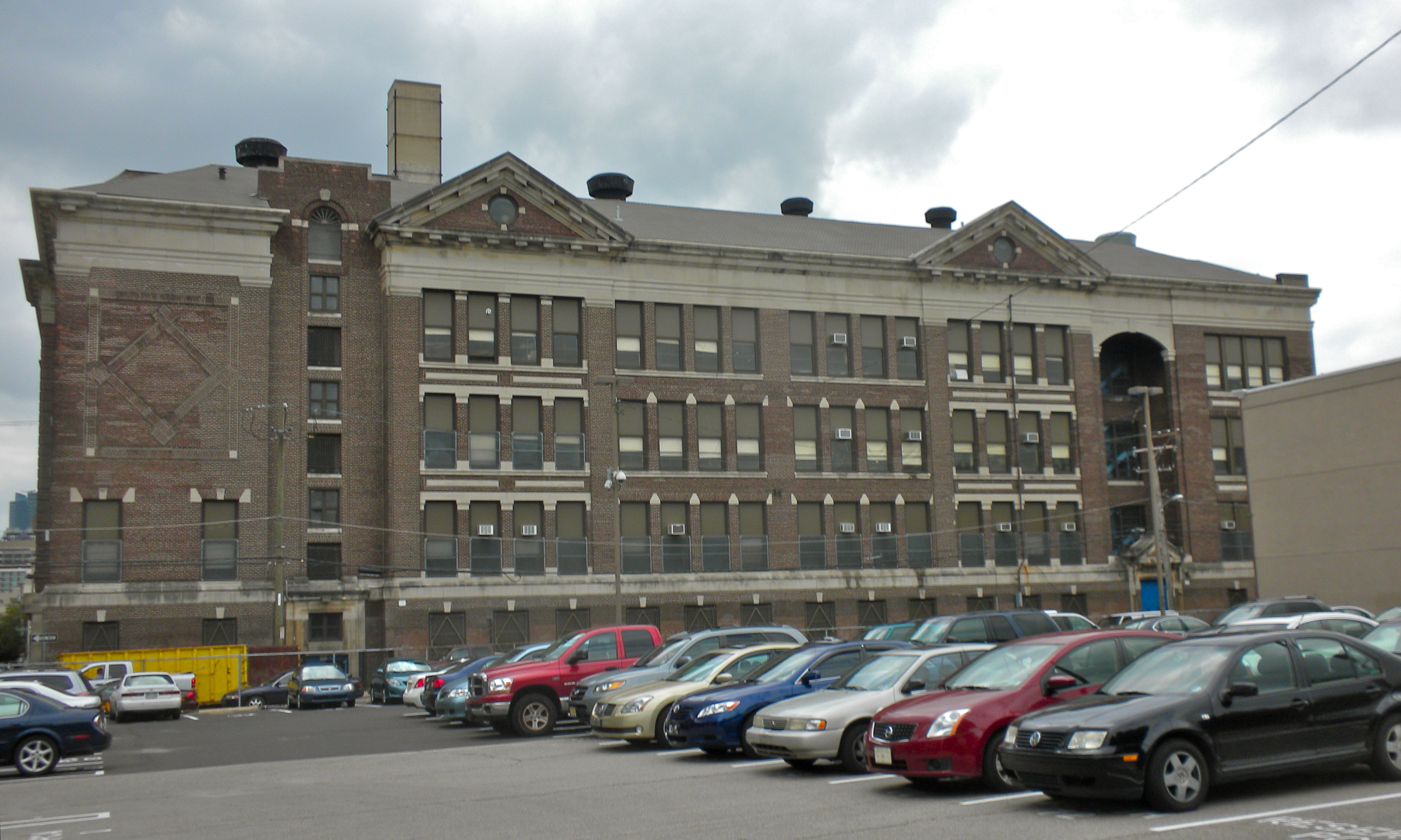
- Franklin Learning Center, August 2010

- Location within Philadelphia Location within Pennsylvania Location within the United States
- Location: 1501 Mount Vernon St., Philadelphia, Pennsylvania
- Coordinates: 39°57′54″N 75°9′48″W
- Area: 1 acre (0.40 ha)
- Built: 1908–1909
- Architect: Henry deCoursey Richards
- Architectural style: Classical Revival
- MPS: Philadelphia Public Schools TR
- NRHP reference No.: 86003316
- Added to NRHP: December 1, 1986

Franklin Learning Center, formerly known as William Penn High School for Girls, is a historic high school located in the Spring Garden neighborhood of Philadelphia, Pennsylvania. It is part of the School District of Philadelphia. The building was designed by Henry deCoursey Richards and built in 1908–1909. It was initially an all-girls school and was one of the earliest racially integrated schools in the city. It is a four-story, brick and limestone building in the Classical Revival-style. It features a projecting center section and two-story portico. The school was named for Pennsylvania founder William Penn.

In 1970, the School District of Philadelphia made plans to renew this school and nearby Benjamin Franklin High School at Broad and Green Streets, which at the time was an all-boys school. The plans were to make William Penn and Benjamin Franklin co-ed. The district moved forward with construction of a new high school campus for William Penn High School at Broad and Master streets in the Yorktown section of North Philadelphia, which was completed and opened during the 1974-1975 academic year.

Meanwhile at Franklin High School, Frank Guido, head of the science department, proposed a different renewal idea for his school, which was to be coed like William Penn. In contrast to William Penn, Guido proposed a competency-based program at Franklin High in which students could work at their own pace based on a ten-point conversion credit system. This system allowed students who were overachievers to complete their high school requirements earlier than when they were scheduled to graduate; for instance, a student could complete the high school program in three years instead of the traditional four years. Although Guido's proposal for this program was approved by the district, the new program was moved to the former William Penn facility instead of remaining at Franklin High.

During the 1974-1975 academic year, the school and program became coed and was renamed Franklin Learning Center (FLC). It was an annex of Franklin High School during its first year of operation, with Frank Guido serving as site director. The following academic year FLC was no longer an annex of Franklin High and had become a magnet school. Guido was promoted to serve as the school's first principal. In 1992 he was promoted to a Regional Superintendent position by the school district. A year later Guido retired for health reasons. In 2006, Frank Guido died.

Today, FLC offers several disciplines or "majors" for its students, including health, business and entrepreneurship, vocal and instrumental music, visual arts, dance, and computer science. It was named a National Blue Ribbon School in 1992 and 2010. The crediting program has been changed and FLC operates on a traditional grading system.

The building was added to the National Register of Historic Places in 1986.
