= Frances E. Willard School =

- Francis E. Willard School
- U.S. National Register of Historic Places
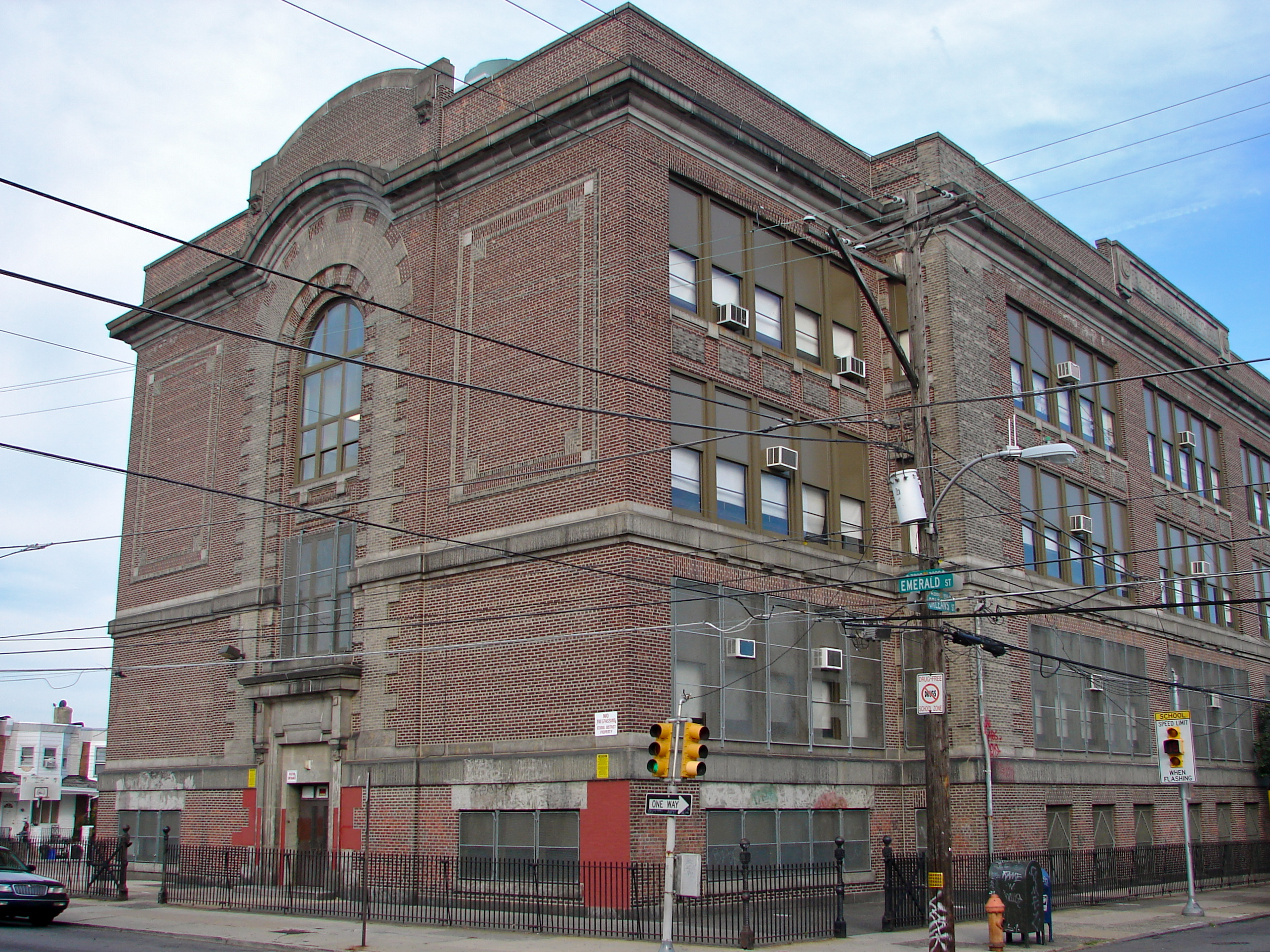
- Francis E. Willard School, September 2010

- Location within Philadelphia Location within Pennsylvania Location within the United States
- Location: Emerald and Orleans Sts., Philadelphia, Pennsylvania
- Coordinates: 39°59′30″N 75°07′02″W
- Area: 1 acre (0.40 ha)
- Built: 1907–1908
- Architect: Henry deCoursey Richards
- Architectural style: Classical Revival
- MPS: Philadelphia Public Schools TR
- NRHP reference No.: 86003346
- Added to NRHP: December 4, 1986

Frances E. Willard School is an elementary school located in the Port Richmond neighborhood of Philadelphia, Pennsylvania, United States. It is part of the School District of Philadelphia. The school is named for suffragist Frances Willard.

The original school building was designed by Henry deCoursey Richards and built in 1907–1908. It is a four-story, three-bay, E-shaped, brick-clad concrete building in the Classical Revival style. It features limestone trim, a 2 1/2-story overscale arched opening, and brick parapet. The building was added to the National Register of Historic Places in 1987.

In 2010, the school moved into a new building on Elkhart Street, just north of the old building.

The school was converted into the Maguire Residence in 2020, an affordable permanent supportive housing option run by Project HOME.
