= Henry deCourcy Richards =

American architect

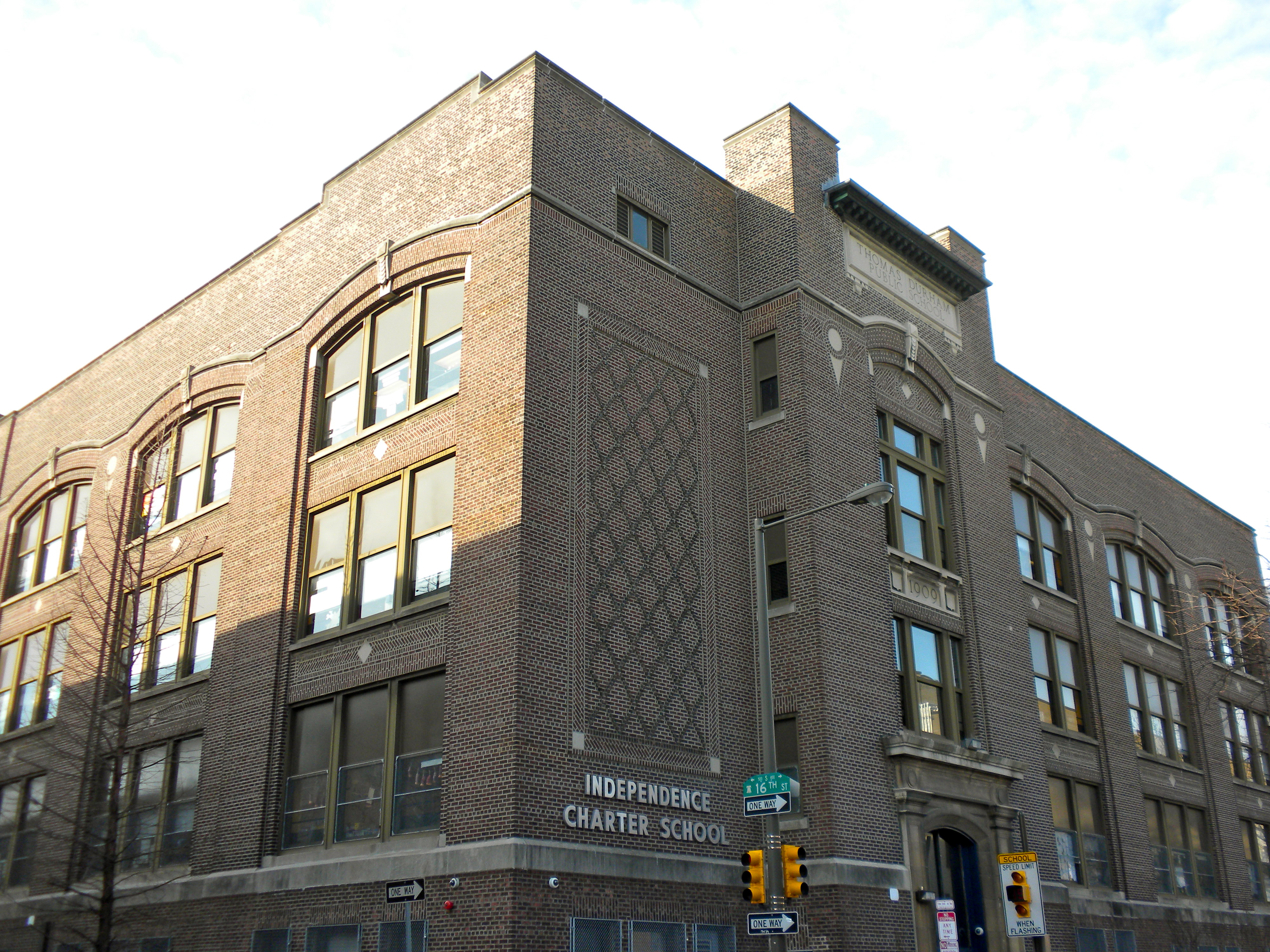
Thomas Durham School, Philadelphia

Henry deCourcy Richards (August 1854 – January 29, 1935), also spelled deCoursey Richards, was an American architect who worked in Philadelphia for the public school system. He designed many public school buildings that have since been listed on the National Register of Historic Places (NRHP) for the quality of their architecture. His successor as school designer for Philadelphia was Irwin T. Catharine.

== Major works ==
NRHP-listed works include:

- Gen. David B. Birney School, 900 W. Lindley St., Philadelphia, PA
- Thomas Durham School, 1600 Lombard St., Philadelphia, PA
- Feltonville School No. 2, 4901 Rising Sun Ave., Philadelphia, PA
- Benjamin Franklin School, 5737 Rising Sun Ave., Philadelphia, PA
- Charles Wolcott Henry School, 601-645 W. Carpenter Ln., Philadelphia, PA
- Holmes Junior High School, 5429-5455 Chestnut St., Philadelphia, PA
- Julia Ward Howe School, 1301-1331 Grange St., Philadelphia, PA
- Kensington High School for Girls, 2075 E. Cumberland St., Philadelphia, PA
- Henry C. Lea School of Practice, 242 S. 47th St., Philadelphia, PA
- Henry Longfellow School, 5004-5098 Tacony St., Philadelphia, PA
- James Russell Lowell School, 5801-5851 N. 5th St., Philadelphia, PA
- John Marshall School, 1501-1527 Sellers St., Philadelphia, PA
- Alexander K. McClure School, 4139 N. 6th St., Philadelphia, PA
- Jeremiah Nichols School, 1235 S. 16th St., Philadelphia, PA
- George Sharswood School, 200 Wolf St., Philadelphia, PA
- Bayard Taylor School, 3614-3630 N. Randolph St., Philadelphia, PA
- John Greenleaf Whittier School, 2600 Clearfield St., Philadelphia, PA
- George L. Brooks School, 5629-5643 Haverford Ave., Philadelphia, PA
- Horace Furness Junior High School, 1900 S. Third St., Philadelphia, PA
- William B. Hanna School, 5720-5738 Media St., Philadelphia, PA
- Nathaniel Hawthorne School, 712 S. Twelfth St., Philadelphia, PA
- John L. Kinsey School, Sixty-fifth Ave. and Limekiln Pike, Philadelphia, PA
- S. Weir Mitchell School, Fifty-sixth and Kingsessing St., Philadelphia, PA
- William Penn High School for Girls, 1501 Wallace St., Philadelphia, PA
- Edgar Allan Poe School, 2136 Ritner St., Philadelphia, PA
- Thomas Buchanan Read School, Seventy-eighth and Buist Ave., Philadelphia, PA
- Southwark School, Eighth and Miflin Sts., Philadelphia, PA
- Anthony Wayne School, 2700 Morris St., Philadelphia, PA
- West Philadelphia High School, 4700 Walnut St., Philadelphia PA
- Francis E. Willard School, Emerald and Orleans Sts., Philadelphia, PA
