= Feltonville School No. 2 =

- U.S. National Register of Historic Places
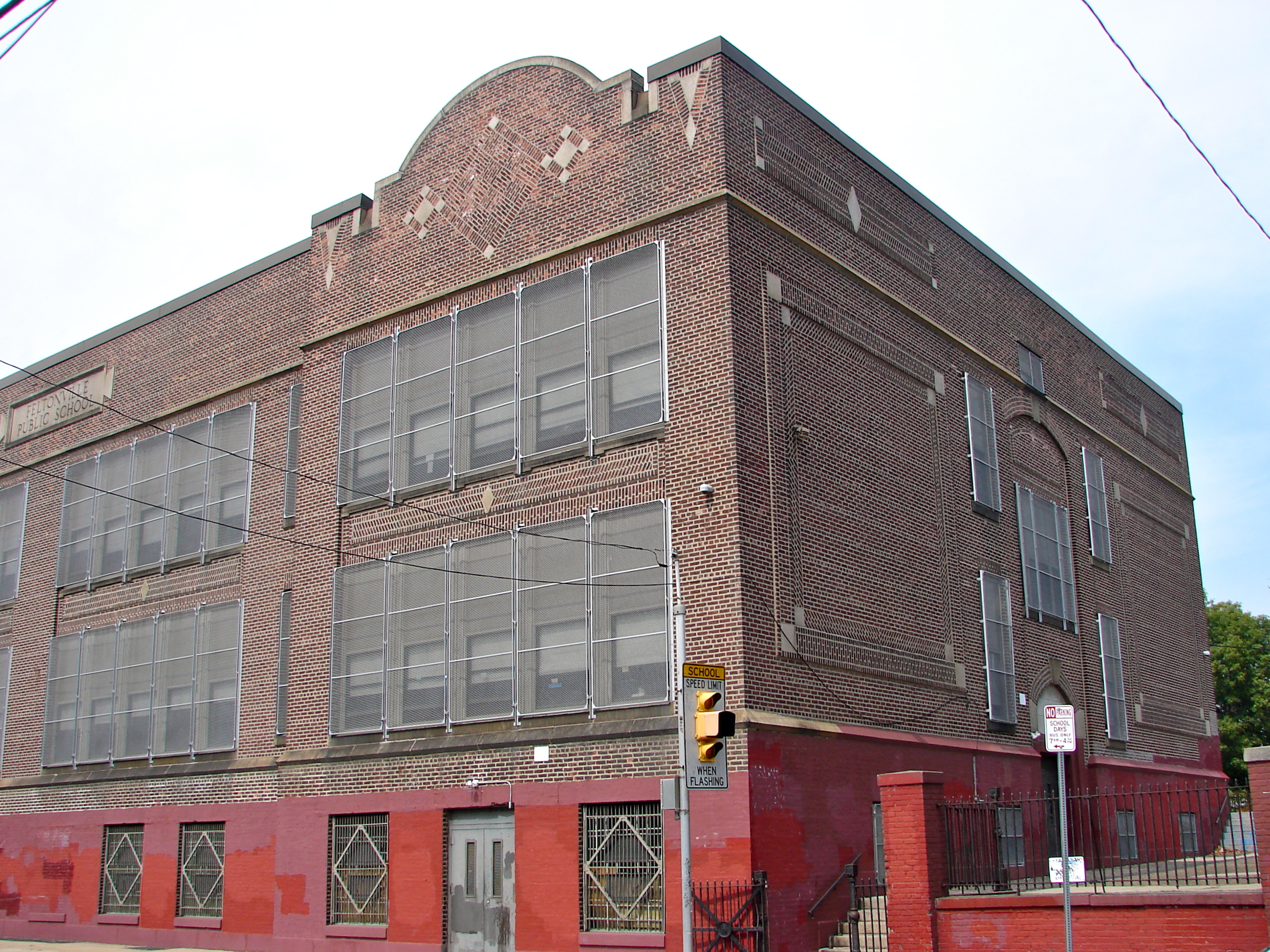
- Feltonville School, September 2010

- Location within Philadelphia Location within Pennsylvania Location within the United States
- Location: 4901 Rising Sun Ave., Philadelphia, Pennsylvania
- Coordinates: 40°1′28″N 75°7′23″W
- Area: less than one acre
- Built: 1908
- Built by: Cramp & Co.
- Architect: Henry deCourcy Richards
- Architectural style: Late Gothic Revival, Utilitarian
- MPS: Philadelphia Public Schools TR
- NRHP reference No.: 88002269
- Added to NRHP: November 18, 1988

Feltonville School No. 2, also known as the Feltonville School, is a historic school building located in the Feltonville neighborhood of Philadelphia, Pennsylvania. It was designed by architect Henry deCourcy Richards and built in 1908. It is a two-story, brick building, four bays wide with a brick parapet. It is in the Late Gothic Revival-style.

It was added to the National Register of Historic Places in 1988. The building is currently used as a Head Start.
