= John Greenleaf Whittier School (Philadelphia) =

- U.S. National Register of Historic Places
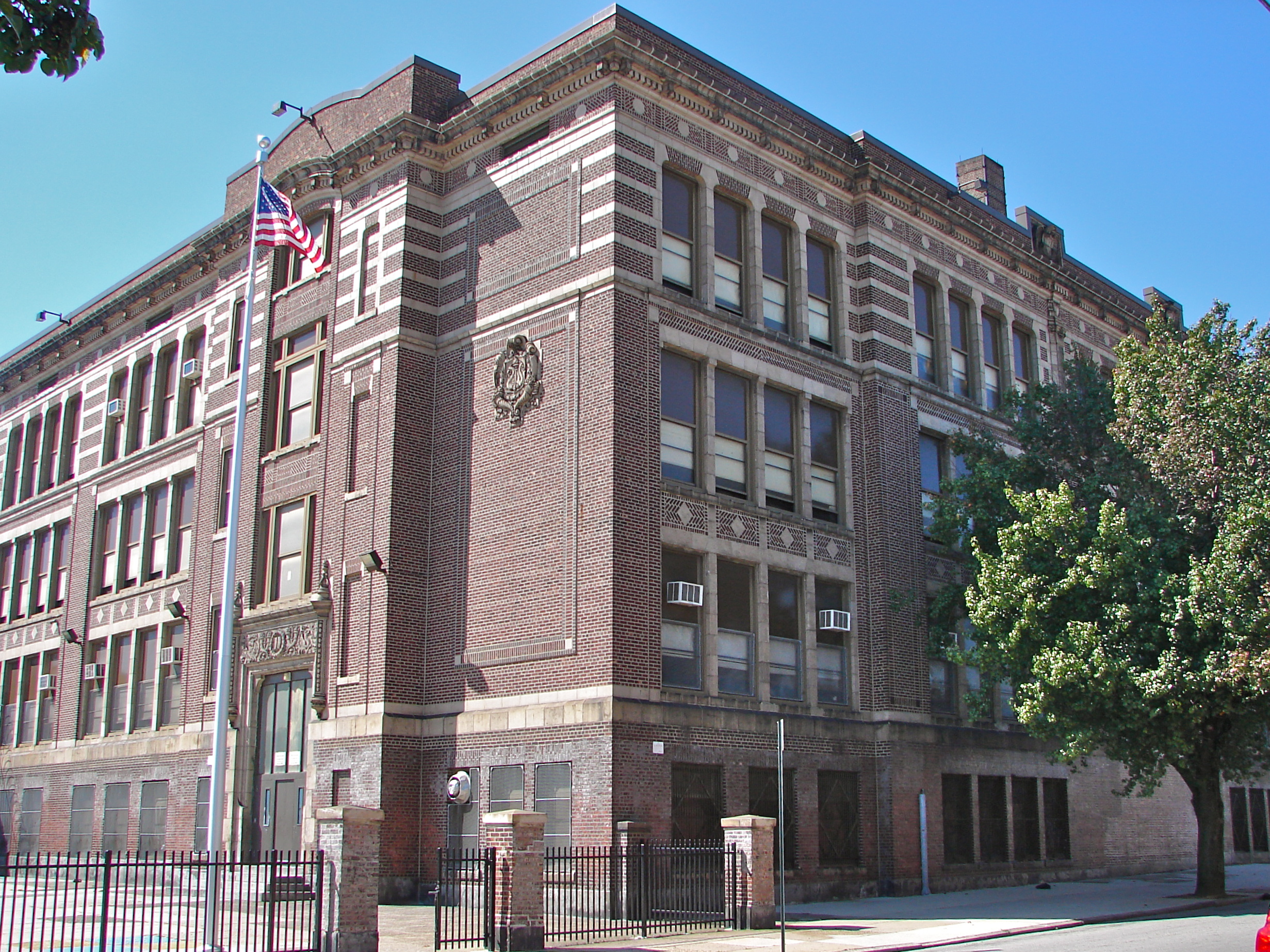
- John Greenleaf Whittier School, September 2010

- Location within Philadelphia Location within Pennsylvania Location within the United States
- Location: 2600 Clearfield St., Philadelphia, Pennsylvania
- Coordinates: 40.0025°N 75.1739°W
- Area: 1.8 acres (0.73 ha)
- Built: 1913
- Built by: Cramp & Co.
- Architect: Henry deCourcy Richards
- Architectural style: Classical Revival
- MPS: Philadelphia Public Schools TR
- NRHP reference No.: 88002334
- Added to NRHP: November 18, 1988

The John Greenleaf Whittier School is a historic American school building in the Allegheny West neighborhood of Philadelphia, Pennsylvania.

It was added to the National Register of Historic Places in 1988. The school was closed in 2013.

== History and architectural features ==
Designed by architect Henry deCourcy Richards, this historic structure was built in 1913. It is a three-story, brick-faced reinforced concrete building, five bays wide with terra cotta trim, and has a Classical Revival-style entrance surround with entablature. It is named for John Greenleaf Whittier (1807-1892).

The school was closed in 2013. The school is now home to KIPP Philadelphia preparatory academy.
