= Willard High School =

Willard High School may refer to:

- Willard High School (Missouri) — Willard, Missouri
- Willard High School (Ohio) — Willard, Ohio
