= Blue Bell =

Blue Bell may refer to:

== Settlements ==
- Blue Bell, Pennsylvania, United States
- Blue Bell, South Dakota, United States

== Buildings ==
- Blue Bell, Chester, a former inn in Cheshire, England
- Blue Bell Inn, Philadelphia, a historic inn in Pennsylvania, U.S.
- Blue Bell Inn, Rochdale, a former pub in Greater Manchester, England
- The Blue Bell, Barton-upon-Humber, a former pub in North Lincolnshire, England
- The Blue Bell, York, a pub in North Yorkshire, England
- The Blue Bell Inn, Ingleby Cross, a pub in North Yorkshire
- The Blue Bell, one of the "blue" public houses and inns in Grantham

== Brands ==
- Blue Bell Creameries, an ice cream brand
- Blue Bell, former manufacturer of the Wrangler jeans clothing brand

== See also ==
- Blue Ball (disambiguation)
- Blue Bell Hill (disambiguation)
- Blue Bell Park
- Blue Bells
- Bluebell (disambiguation)
