= Blue Hill =

Blue Hill may refer to:

== Places ==
- Blue Hill, Saint Helena, a district at the western end of the island of Saint Helena

=== United States ===
- Blue Hill, Kansas
- Blue Hill, Maine, a town
  - Blue Hill (CDP), Maine, the main village in the town
- Blue Hill, Nebraska, a small city
- Blue Hill (New York), a mountain in Sullivan County
- Blue Hill, Texas
- Blue Hill Township, Sherburne County, Minnesota
- Great Blue Hill, a summit in Massachusetts
  - Blue Hill Meteorological Observatory, on Great Blue Hill

== Other uses ==
- Blue Hill (restaurant), New York City
- Blue Hill at Stone Barns, a restaurant in Pocantico Hills, New York

== See also ==
- East Blue Hill, Maine
- Blue Bell Hill (disambiguation)
- Blue Hills (disambiguation)
- Blueberry Hill (disambiguation)
- Cerro Azul (disambiguation) (Blue Hill in Portuguese and Spanish)
