= Blue Bell Park =

Park in Germantown, Philadelphia

Coordinates: 40.033070°N 75.196913°W

Blue Bell Hill Park commonly known as Blue Bell Park is a small park located in Blue Bell Hill by Germantown, Philadelphia. The park is located on the Wissahickon Creek and is directly southeast of Wissahickon Valley Park. The RittenhouseTown Historic District is located at Blue Bell Hill.

In 1974, a small group of undergraduate Pan-Hellenic Council members known as "The Family" founded the Philadelphia Greek Picnic in Blue Bell Park which later attracted an attendance of over 250,000 people.

== See also ==
- Wissahickon Creek
- Wissahickon Trail
- Fairmount Park
- Wissahickon Valley Park
