= Wissahickon Creek =

Creek in Pennsylvania, US

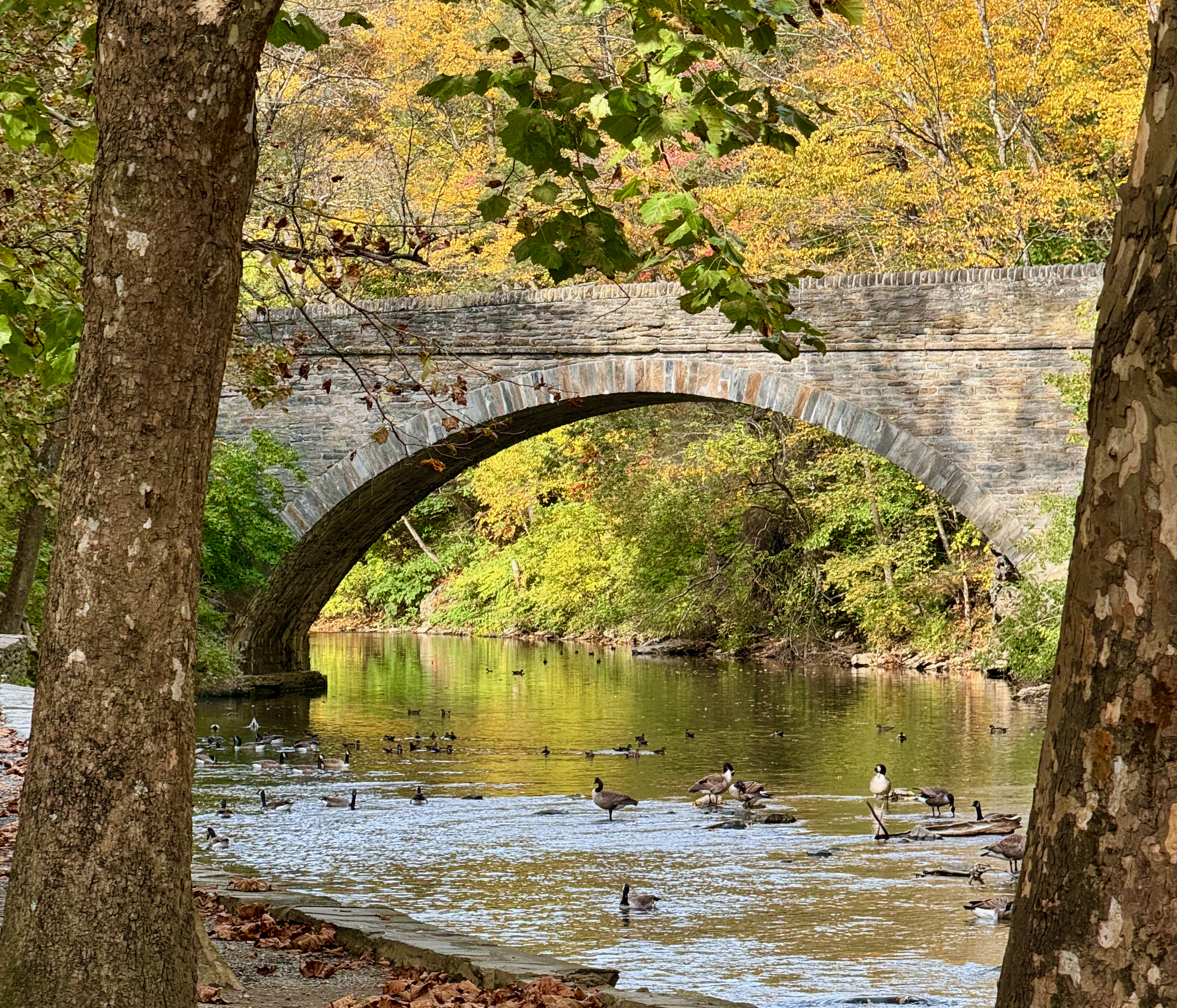
- Wissahickon Creek runs under the Valley Green Bridge in Philadelphia

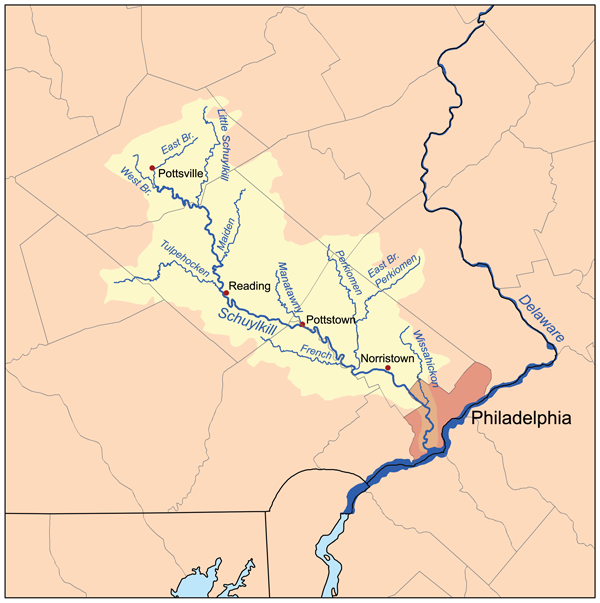
- Schuylkill River watershed

Location
- Country: United States
- State: Pennsylvania
- Counties: Montgomery County, Philadelphia County

Physical characteristics
- Source
  - coordinates: 40°14′34″N 75°15′16″W
- Mouth
  - coordinates: 40°0′47″N 75°12′25″W
- Length: 23 mi (37 km)
- Basin size: 64 sq mi (170 km^{2})

Wissahickon Creek is a tributary of the Schuylkill River in Montgomery and Philadelphia Counties, Pennsylvania.

Wissahickon Creek rises in Montgomery County, runs approximately 23 miles (37 km) passing through and dividing Northwest Philadelphia before emptying into the Schuylkill River at Philadelphia. Its watershed covers about 64 square miles (170 km^{2}).

Much of the creek now runs through or next to parkland, with the last few miles running through a deep gorge. The beauty of this area attracted the attention of writers including Edgar Allan Poe and John Greenleaf Whittier. The gorge area is now part of Wissahickon Valley Park in Philadelphia, and the Wissahickon Valley is known as one of 600 National Natural Landmarks of the United States.

The name of the creek comes from the Lenape word wiessahitkonk, for "catfish creek" or "stream of yellowish color". On the earliest map of this region of Pennsylvania, by Thomas Holme, the stream is called Whitpaine's creek, after one of the original settlers Richard Whitpaine, who owned several large tracts on the creek. Whitpaine was an early land owner in the days of William Penn.

== Geography and recreation ==
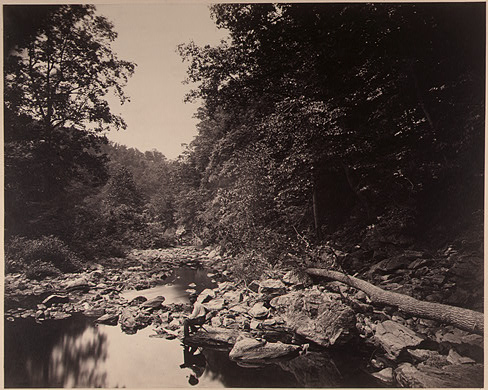
Wissahickon Creek near Philadelphia photo by John Moran, c. 1865

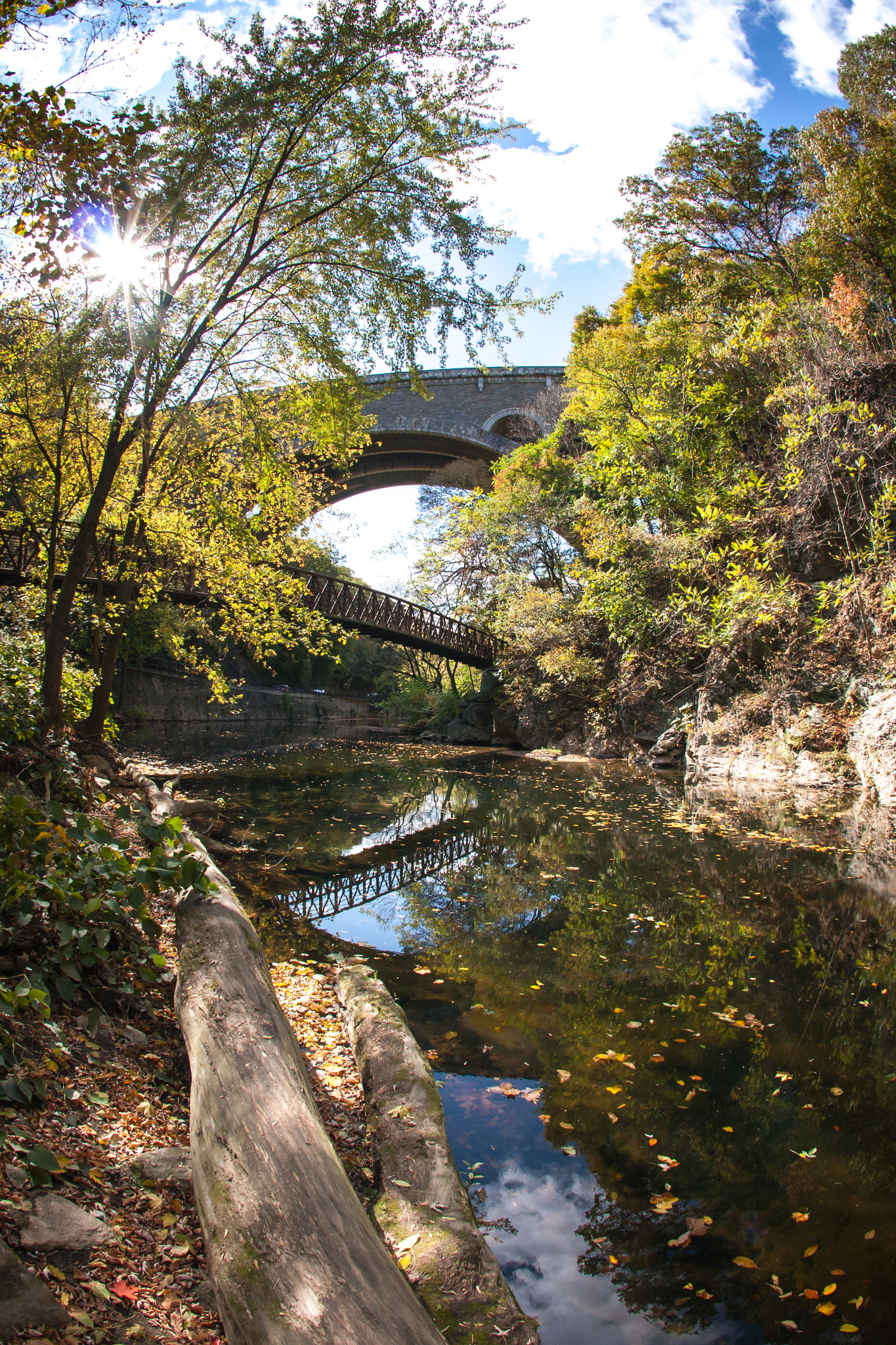
Wissahickon Creek with Wissahickon Memorial Bridge in Background, 2008

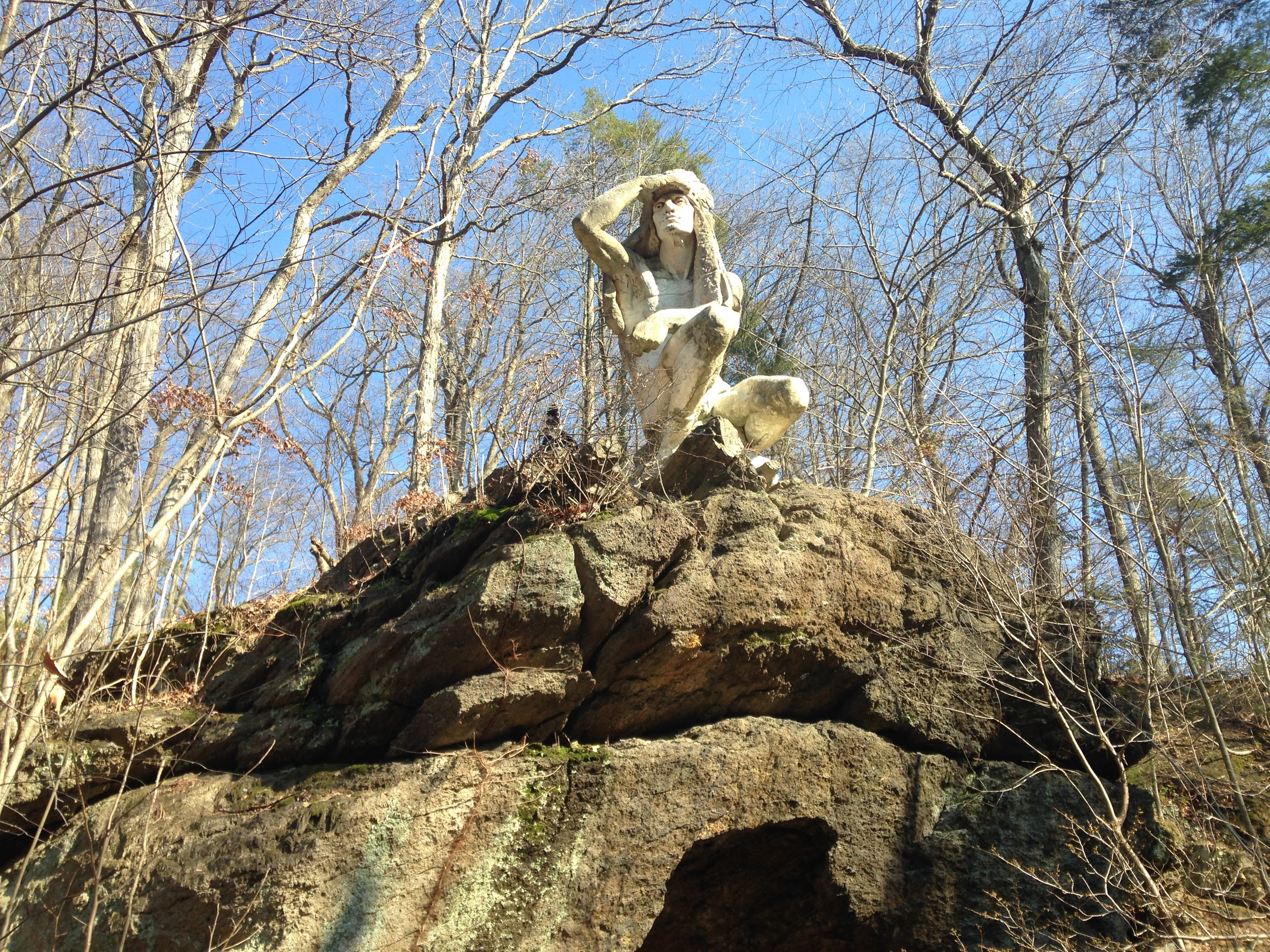
The Teedyuscung statue

In its last 7 miles (11 km), the Wissahickon stream drops over 100 feet (30 m) in altitude. Its geography and dense forest attract thousands of walkers, equestrians, and bicyclists.

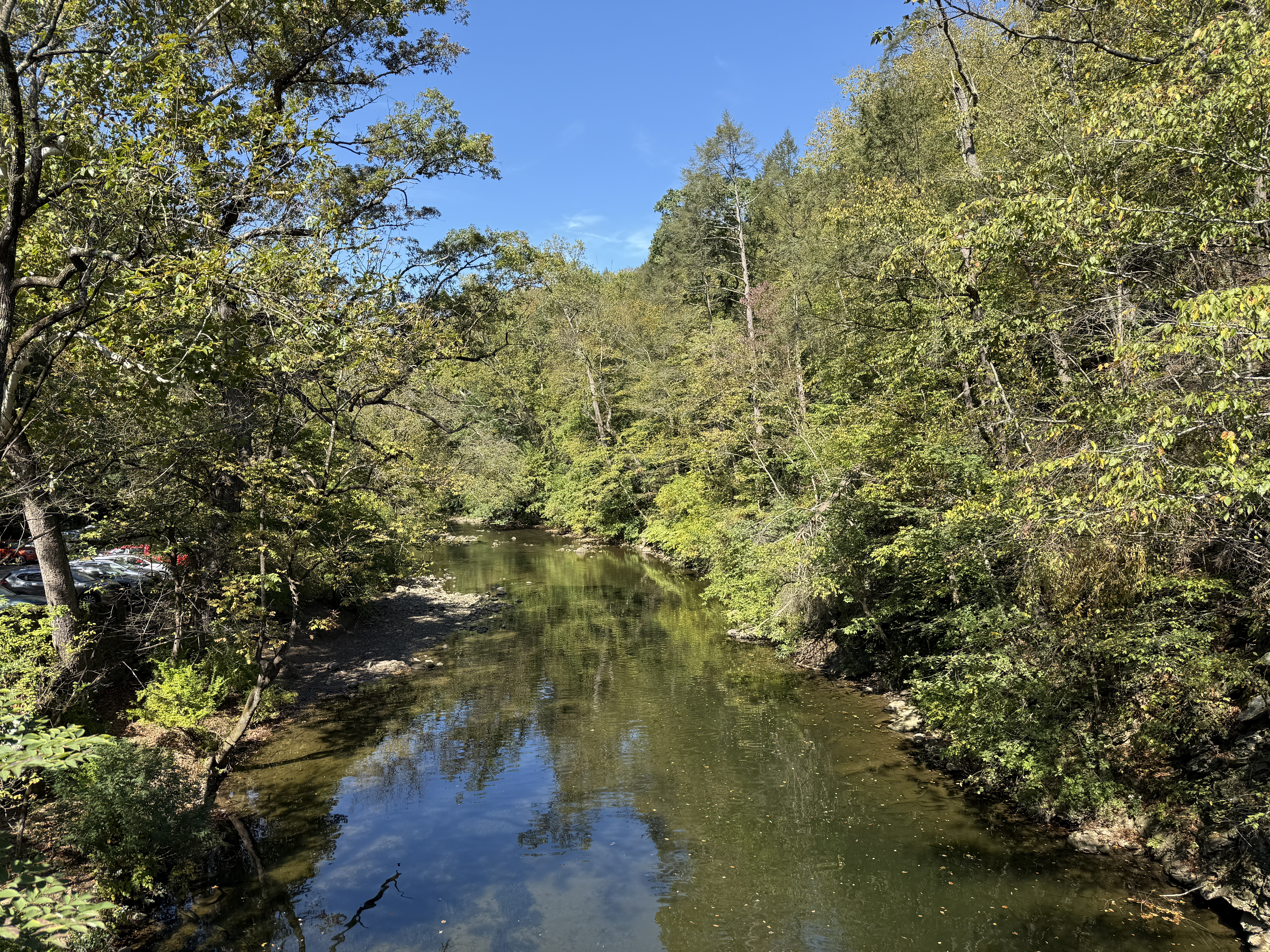
Wissahickon Creek in Wissahickon Valley Park

Once the stream enters the city of Philadelphia, the creek valley and its deeply wooded gorge form part of the Fairmount Park system in Philadelphia. Wooded inclines that rise more than 200 feet (61 m) above the water create a feeling of remoteness from the surrounding city. There are two main and many smaller bridle paths crossing the park's 1,372 acres (5.55 km^{2}) along the Wissahickon Creek. Thomas Mill Covered Bridge, the only covered bridge in a major US city, spans the creek in the park.

Devil's Pool is a swimming area on the mouth of Cresheim Creek. As the ravine widens into the Cresheim, the waters gather in a basin surrounded on either side by rocky outcroppings before flowing into the Wissahickon Creek. Legend has it that the Native American Lenape tribes used this as a spiritual area, where local author Phyllis Knapp Thomas writes that "...the Good Spirit is claimed to have banished the Evil Spirit into deep, dark waters". Although it is not legal due to unsafe levels of pollutants, Devil's pool has become a popular area to swim, lounge, and drink. Litter around the pool is a persistent problem, with volunteer cleanups organized by the "Friends of Wissahickon" organization.

The Philadelphia Canoe Club at the mouth of the creek is devoted to promoting paddling through instruction and education.

Another outlook in the park is Mom Rinker's Rock, on a ridge on the eastern side of the Park just north of the Walnut Lane Bridge.

== Geology ==
A tremendous variety of geology is evident along Wissahickon Creek. Three of the geologic regions that the stream passes through are the Newark Basin of Triassic sandstone and shale, the limestone and dolomite of the Chester Valley, and the Wissahickon Formation where the waters of the stream flow into the Schuylkill River and eventually the Delaware.

A distinctive rock of the Wissahickon Creek valley is Wissahickon schist, the predominant bedrock underlying the Philadelphia region, found over a broad swath of southeastern Pennsylvania from Trenton into Delaware and Maryland. This Precambrian to Cambrian stone, first studied in the Wissahickon gorge, has flecks of glittery mica, small garnets, and many-toned shadings of gray, brown, tan, and blue, and became a common building material in the 19th and early 20th centuries.

In addition to Wissahickon schist, there are layers of quartzite in the valley. Both schist and quartzite are metamorphic rocks formed from sedimentary deposits of mud and sand that one time were washed from ancient continents into a shallow sea. These sedimentary deposits were over time compressed into shale and sandstone. During long periods of mountain building, the shale and sandstone were slowly transformed into the schist and quartzite found today. In some places, the compression and heat were extreme enough to fuse the schist with emerging igneous rocks into hard-banded gneiss.

Other rocks in the valley are layers of igneous pegmatite and remains of granite plutons, embedded crystals within the schist. A few locations close to Devil's Pool and along Bell's Mill Road have a talc schist which contains the mineral talc, so soft it can be scratched with a fingernail.

== Tributaries ==
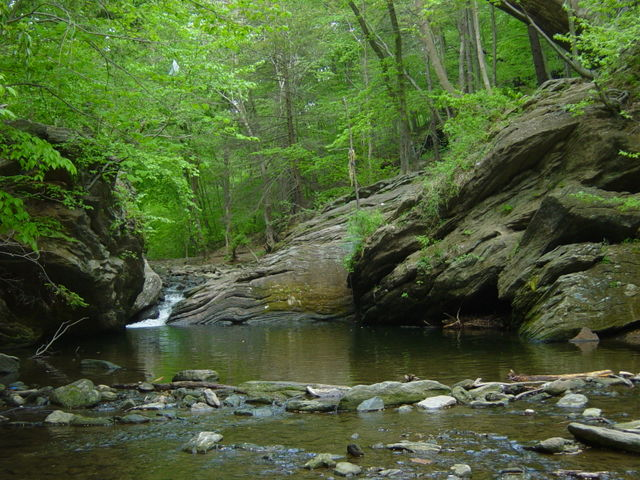
Cresheim Creek before it meets Wissahickon Creek.

- Trewellyn Creek
- Willow Run
- Prophecy Creek
- Sandy Run
- Sunny Brook
- Lorraine Run
- Arlingham Run
- Cresheim Creek
- Gorgas Run
- Carpenter's Run
- Paper Mill Run
- Andorra Run
- Bells Mill Run
- Thomas Mill Run
- Cathedral Run
- Hartwell Run
- Wises Mill Run
- Valley Green Run
- Monoshone Creek

== History ==
=== Johannes Kelpius ===
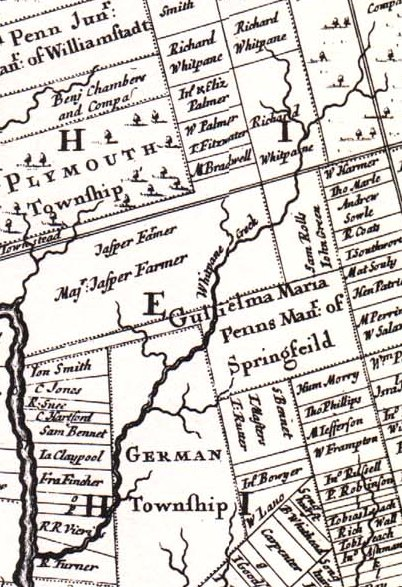
Thomas Holmes' 1687 map showing Wissahickon Creek (here called Whitpaine's creek) in Germantown then north of Philadelphia

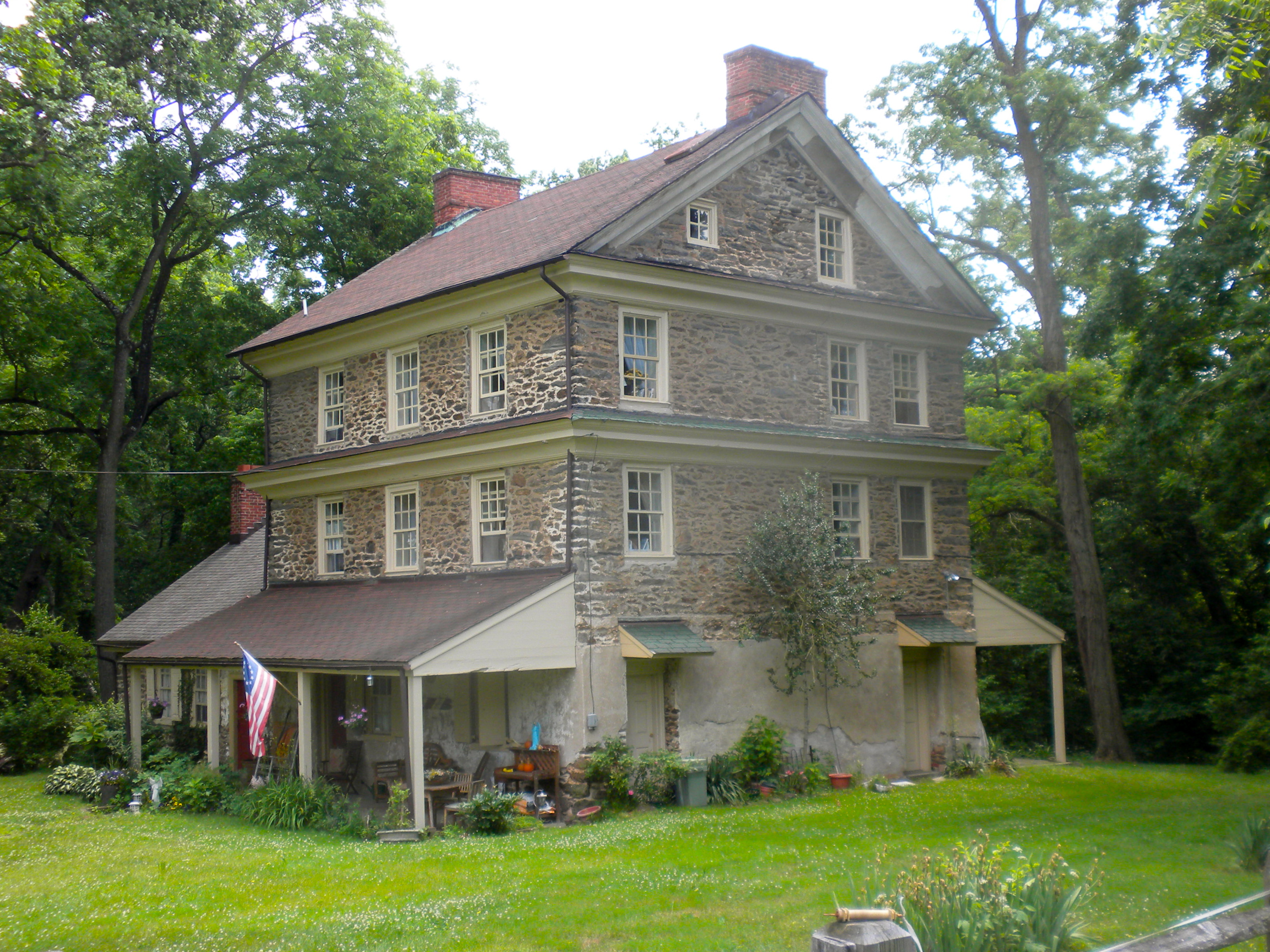
The Monastery in 2010

In 1694, Johannes Kelpius arrived in Philadelphia with a group of like-minded German Pietists to live in the valley of the Wissahickon Creek. They formed a monastic community and became known as the Hermits or Mystics of the Wissahickon. Kelpius was a musician, writer, and occultist. He frequently meditated (some believe in a cave—the Cave of Kelpius 40.023544°N 75.200665°W) along the banks of the Wissahickon and awaited the end of the world, which was expected in 1694. No sign or revelation accompanied that year, but the faithful continued to live in celibacy by the stream, searching the stars and hoping for the end. Kelpius described the type of meditation he used in his Method of Prayer. (See Further Reading below on this book.) Kelpius died in 1708 and the group disbanded some time thereafter. Some members likely gave up on celibacy and married. A few joined the somewhat like-minded religious colony of Ephrata Cloister under Conrad Beissel in Ephrata, Lancaster County, even though no previous connection existed between the two communities. At least two from the original group, Johann Seelig and Konrad Matthaei, continued as hermits along the Wissahickon into the 1740s.

Other religious groups were also associated with the Wissahickon. On Christmas Day in 1723, the first congregation of the Church of the Brethren in America – often called Dunkard Brethren – baptized several new members in the stream. Around 1747, an individual with connections to both the Dunkards and the Ephrata Cloister built a stone house on land previously owned by Dunkards. The structure, used for church retreats, still stands today, and is known as The Monastery.

=== Development ===
The same steep slopes and gorge that provided an attractive isolation to religious adherents in the 17th and early 18th centuries provided an efficient source of energy for the development of water mills in later years. One miller had by 1690 already constructed a dam, sawmill, gristmill, and house by the narrow shelf of land at the confluence of the Wissahickon with the Schuylkill River, but the rugged terrain of the valley forestalled further development alongside the stream itself. By 1730, however, eight mills had been constructed, and by 1793, twenty-four, along with many dams. Most of America was still wilderness, but the Wissahickon Valley was a developing industrial center. There were more than fifty watermills by 1850, though the thickly forested region about the stream still retained the character of a wilderness. Access roads were being constructed into the steep valley, but there was still no road that followed the stream itself. The nature of the rugged terrain can be comprehended in an event that had occurred during the Revolutionary War Battle of Germantown, which was fought not too far from the stream. The American General John Armstrong, compelled by the rough terrain to abandon a cannon in the valley, expressed his contempt for the "horrendous hills of the Wissahickon." Later legends tell of American spies taking advantage of the terrain to retrieve information from an informant named Mom Rinker, who allegedly perched atop a rock overlooking the valley to drop balls of yarn which contained messages about British troop movements during the occupation of Philadelphia. She is the namesake of Mom Rinker's Rock in the park.

Not until 1826 were the cliffs near the creek's mouth blasted away to provide access to the cluster of mills at Rittenhousetown, approximately 1.5 mi (2.4 km) up the creek on Paper Mill Run (also known as Monoshone Creek), a small tributary of the Wissahickon. Here William Rittenhouse (grandfather of the astronomer David Rittenhouse) had in the early 18th century built the first paper mill in America. Gradually this road and other mill access roads were connected, and in 1856 a private toll road, the Wissahickon Turnpike, linked the entire valley. Long gone were the religious mystics; here instead the mills of Wissahickon Creek made paper, cloth, gunpowder, sawed lumber, milled wheat and corn, and pressed oil from flax. A sizable population worked at the mills and lived in the valley in small villages like Rittenhousetown and Pumpkinville. The nation was becoming an industrial nation, and the Wissahickon was leading the way.

Benjamin Franklin noted in his will the high elevation and quality of Wissahickon water, and proposed that the stream be dammed to supply a safe and pure water source for Philadelphia, and even allocated funds for this purpose. This did not happen, but the quest for pure water affected the Wissahickon's subsequent history. Seeking to prevent the stream's industrial discharges from affecting the purity of the water of the Schuylkill River, the Fairmount Park Commission took title of much of the land along the Wissahickon in 1869-1870, and continued to expand its holdings in subsequent decades. The mills were razed; the last active mill was demolished in 1884. Several decades later the Schuylkill River itself became seriously polluted by sources in the coal fields far upstream beyond Philadelphia's control, but the waters of the Wissahickon had been restored and the beauty of the Wissahickon Valley had been preserved. Most of America became more industrialized, but the Wissahickon valley quietly returned to its original character.

A reason the Wissahickon Valley retained its wilderness character, even after its clean waters were no longer essential to the water supply of Philadelphia, was the advent of romanticism and the changing attitudes which this thought engendered about nature. Before the 19th century, nature had seemed a capricious and ambivalent force. Nature, according to orthodox Christian thought, had fallen with man. The Renaissance brought about both a new view of mankind and nature, and eventually resulted in a literary and artistic movement known as Romanticism. Romantics valued heroism and chivalry in people, and regarded the wild, free, and untamed nature as the "natural" model of true beauty. Philadelphians finally came to value their Wissahickon valley for its wild character. Even when the mills were still operating, there were remote stretches of wild bluffs and overarching trees; now the old mills had become romantic and picturesque, with mossy stone walls suggesting medieval ruins. In 1924, area residents formed the non-profit group "Friends of the Wissahickon", which still works to maintain the park's unique landscape to this day.

However much the stream and its valley were appreciated, it still divided parts of the city. To help overcome this, in 1906 the Walnut Lane Bridge was built over the stream, which was the world's largest concrete arch bridge at the time. The bridge joined the Roxborough and Germantown neighborhoods of Philadelphia, formerly separated by the Wissahickon gorge. The bridge is but 480 feet (150 m) long, with a width of 60 feet (18 m), but its center arch spans an impressive 225 feet (69 m), the crown of the arch is 109 feet (33 m) above the water, and the sidewalks of the bridge 120 feet (37 m) above the Wissahickon.

=== Wissahickon Day ===
In the past, there was an annual parade of horses, riders, and carriage annually in May for Wissahickon Day, a festive gala popular among Philadelphia's equestrians and social elites.

=== Wissahickon Memorial Bridge ===
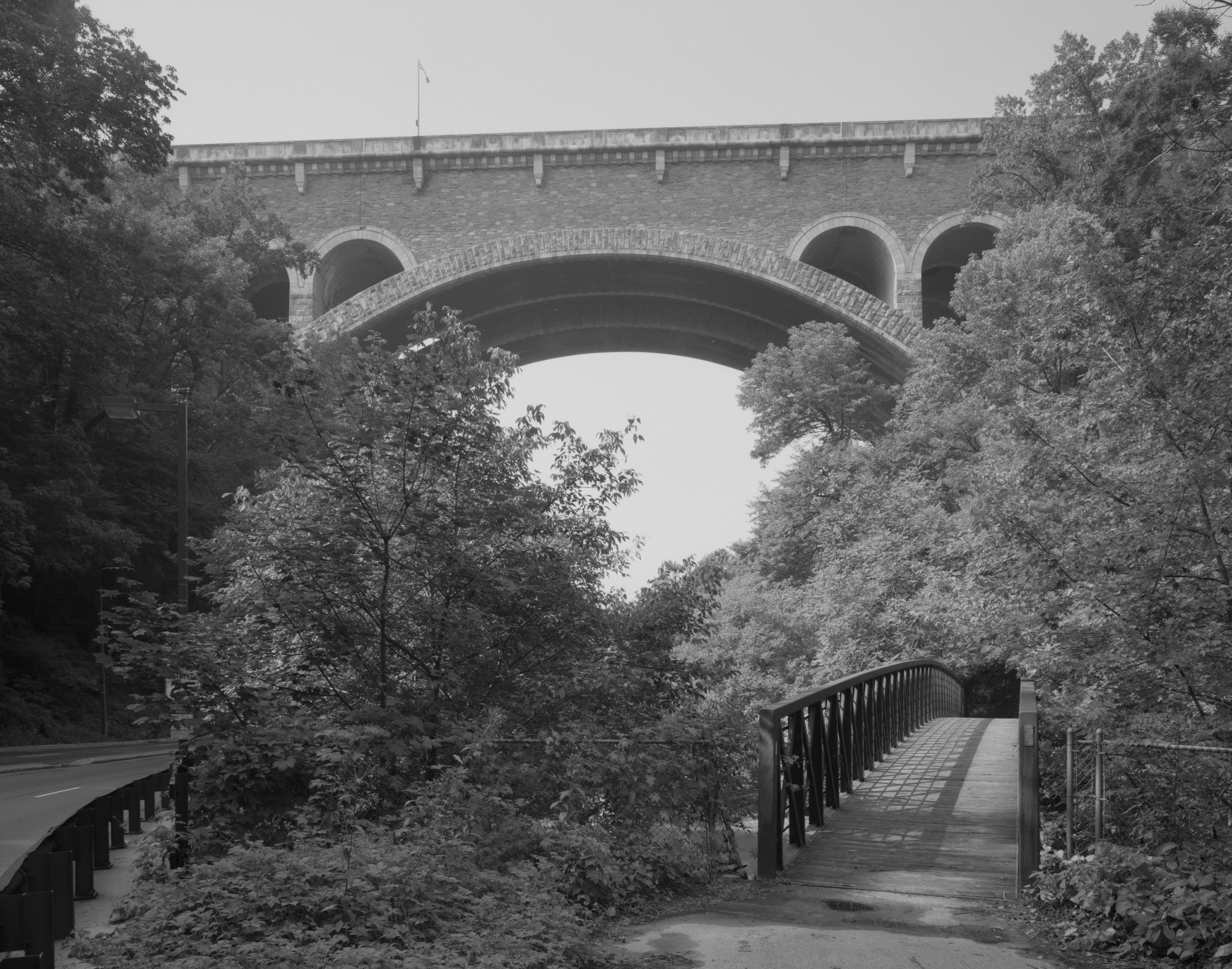
Henry Avenue Bridge (1932), Paul Philippe Cret, architect.

The Wissahickon Memorial Bridge, also known as Henry Avenue Bridge, is a stone and concrete bridge that carries Henry Avenue over Wissahickon Creek, joining Roxborough and the East Falls-Germantown neighborhoods in Philadelphia. It was completed in 1932 and is 915 feet (279 m) long, 84 feet (26 m) wide, and 185 feet (56 m) above water. It was originally designed to carry a planned extension of a subway into Roxborough, but the subway never reached the bridge. The bridge has been known as a suicide bridge since its opening. Beginning in 1941 for an unknown duration of time a policeman patrolled the span, questioning all pedestrians walking the bridge.

== In popular culture ==
=== Literature ===
Among the earliest references to the valley was by William Cobbett in his book Rural Rides, which takes the form of a series of letters. In one dated 1821 he said,

These are the fogs that sweep off the new settlers in the American woods. I remember a valley in Pennsylvania, in a part called Wysihicken [sic]. In looking from a hill, over this valley, early in the morning, in November, it presented one of the most beautiful sights that my eyes ever beheld. It was a sea bordered with beautifully formed trees of endless variety of colours. As the hills formed the outsides of the sea, some of the trees showed only their tops; and, every now and then, a lofty tree growing in the sea itself, raised its head above the apparent waters. Except the setting-sun sending his horizontal beams through all the variety of reds and yellows of the branches of the trees in Long Island, and giving, at the same time, a sort of silver cast to the verdure beneath them, I have never seen anything so beautiful as the foggy valley of the Wysihicken.

Actress Fanny Kemble, grandmother to novelist Owen Wister, visited the stream in 1832. Her writing awakened a more general interest in the stream and its valley. Her description of the gorge's dramatic end at the stream's confluence with the Schuylkill River and her verse To the Wissahickon both sparked a keen interest in this natural treasure. She wrote:

The thick, bright, rich-tufted cedars, basking in the warm amber glow, the picturesque mill, the smooth open field, along whose side the river waters, after receiving this child of the mountains into their bosom, wound deep, and bright, and still, the whole radiant with the softest light I ever beheld, formed a most enchanting and serene subject of contemplation.

Edgar Allan Poe alluded to Fanny Kemble's writing in his description of the Wissahickon in his 1844 essay "Morning on the Wissahiccon", in which he wrote:

Now the Wissahiccon is of so remarkable a loveliness that, were it flowing in England, it would be the theme of every bard, and the common topic of every tongue, if, indeed, its banks were not parcelled off in lots, at an exorbitant price, as building-sites for the villas of the opulent. Yet it is only within a very few years that any one has more than heard of the Wissahiccon ... the brook is narrow. Its banks are generally, indeed almost universally, precipitous, and consist of high hills, clothed with noble shrubbery near the water, and crowned at a greater elevation, with some of the most magnificent forest trees of America, among which stands conspicuous the liriodendron tulipiferum. The immediate shores, however, are of granite, sharply defined or moss-covered, against which the pellucid water lolls in its gentle flow, as the blue waves of the Mediterranean upon the steps of her palaces of marble.

The novelist George Lippard frequently wrote about the Wissahickon, and was even married at sunset on or around May 14, 1847, on Mom Rinker's Rock. One of his books, The Rose of Wissahikon; or, The Fourth of July, 1776. A Romance, Embracing the Secret History of the Declaration of Independence (1847) may refer not only to the Wissahickon, but to his wife, the former Rose Newman. He wrote:

A poem of everlasting beauty and a dream of magnificance – the world-hidden, wood embowered Wissahickon.

Depending on one of Lippard's stories, John Greenleaf Whittier wrote about Johannes Kelpius and his followers on the Wissahickon in his 1872 poem Pennsylvania Pilgrim:

Or painful Kelpius from his hermit den
By Wissahickon, maddest of good men,
Dreamed o'er the Chiliast dreams of Petersen.

Deep in the woods, where the small river slid
Snake-like in shape, the Helmstadt mystic hid,
Weird as a wizard over arts forbid.

Christopher Morley also portrayed the valley's beauty in his writings.

The Wissahickon is mentioned very briefly in A Biography of the Poet, Sidney Lanier by Edwin Mims.

Mark Twain mentioned the Wissahickon during the short time he spent in Philadelphia working for The Philadelphia Inquirer: "Unlike New York, I like this Philadelphia amazingly, and the people in it ... I saw small steamboats, with their signs up—"For Wissahickon and Manayunk 25 cents". Geo. Lippard, in his Legends of Washington and his Generals, has rendered the Wissahickon sacred in my eyes, and I shall make that trip, as well as one to Germantown, soon ..."

Ron P. Swegman, a fly fishing angler, artist, and author, wrote extensively about Wissahickon Creek in two illustrated essay collections, Philadelphia on the Fly and Small Fry: The Lure of the Little..

=== Art ===
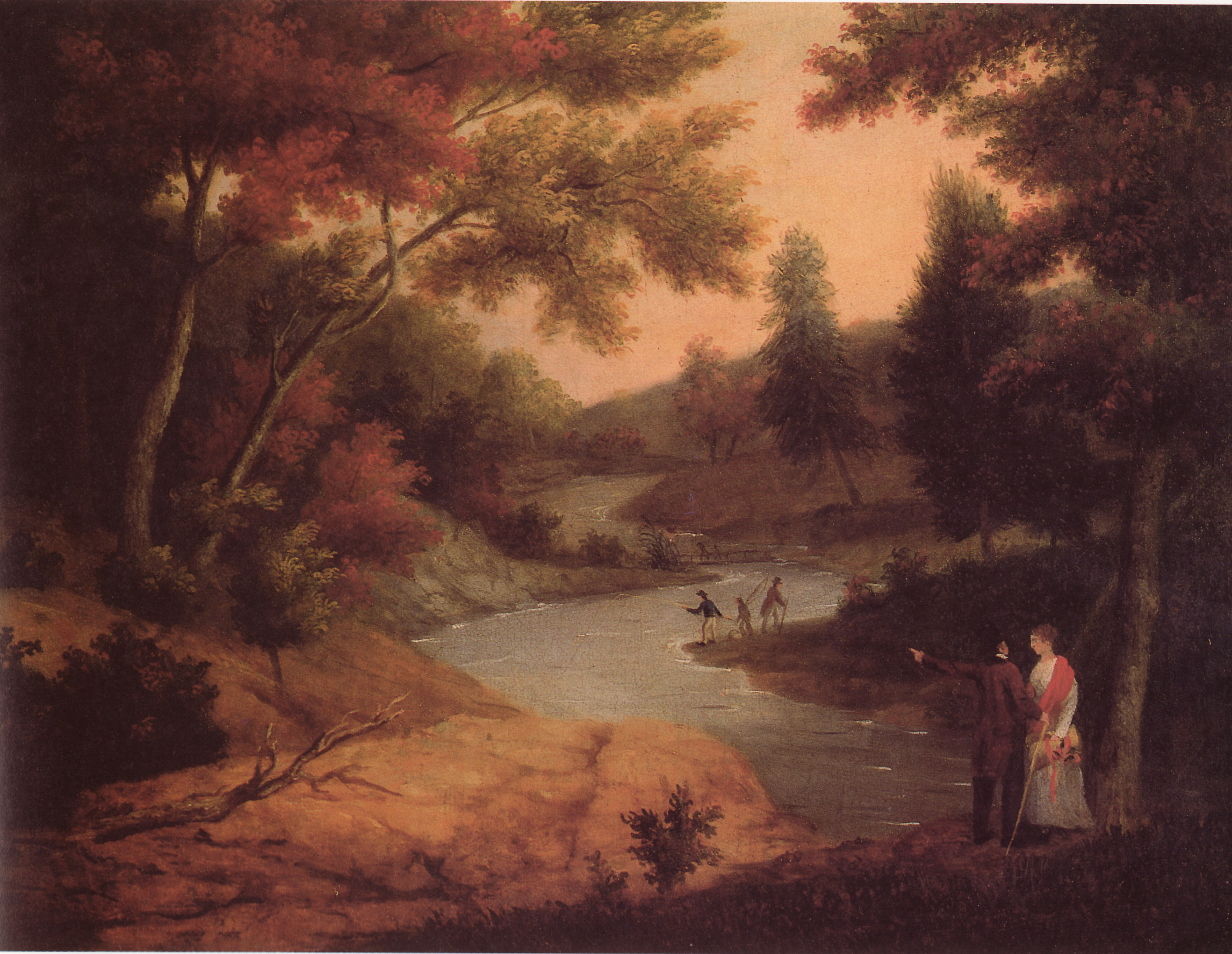
Philadelphia Museum of Art View on the Wissahickon by James Peale (1830).

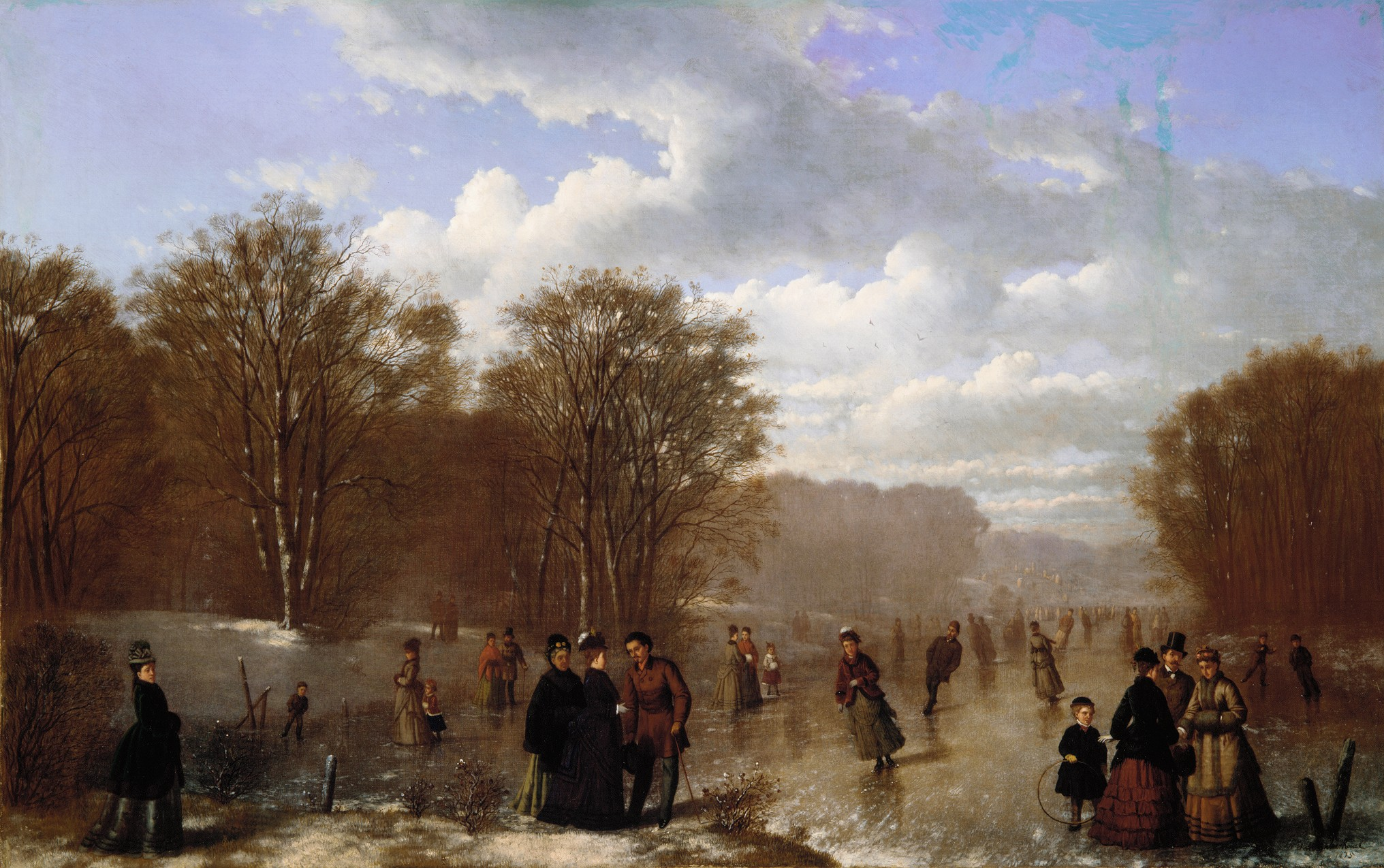
Skating on the Wissahickon near Philadelphia by J. M. Culverhouse (1875).

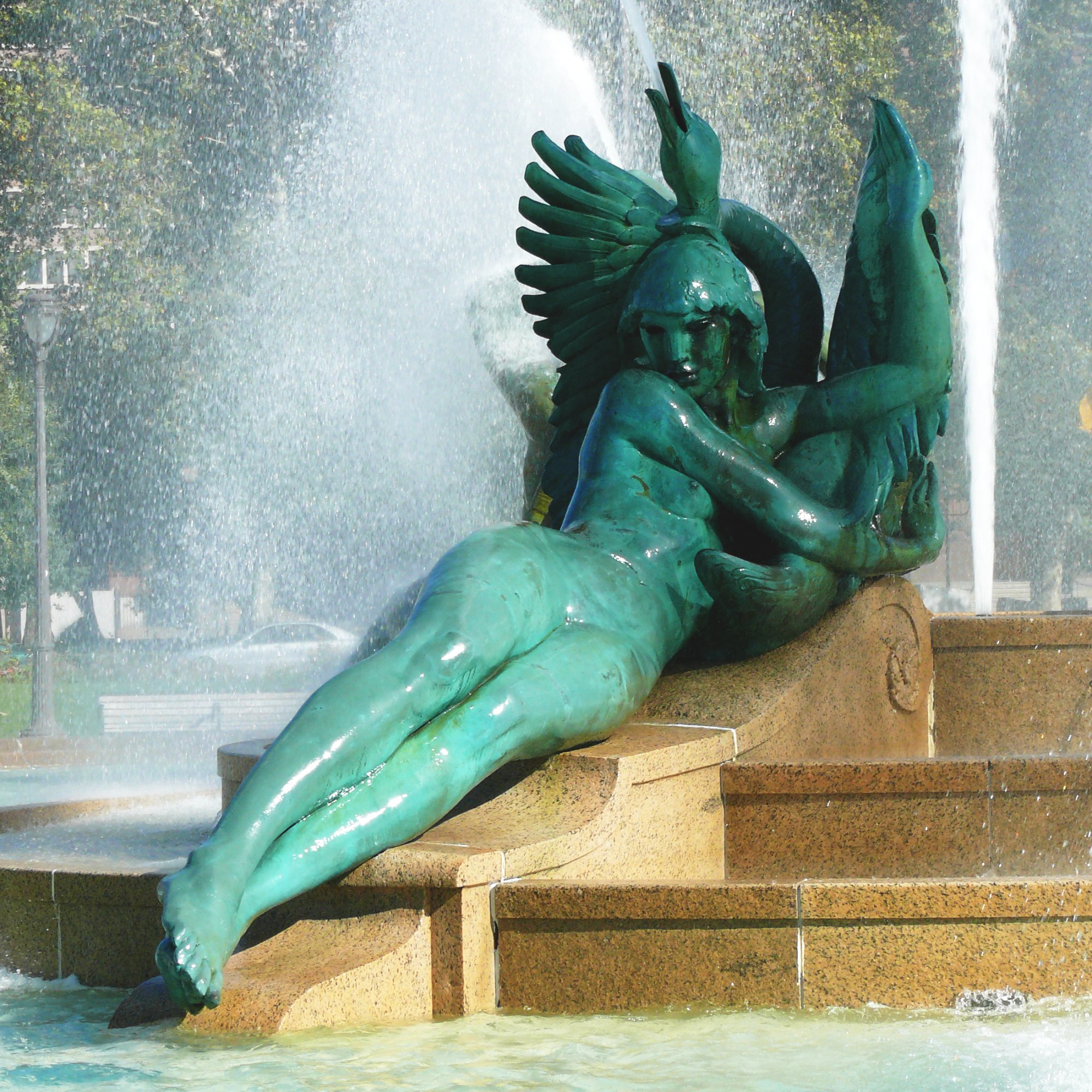
"Allegorical Figure of The Wissahickon" by Alexander Stirling Calder, Swann Memorial Fountain, Philadelphia, PA (1924).

Artists have portrayed the stream and its valley:

- Johan Mengels Culverhouse, Skating on the Wissahickon River Near Philadelphia, 1875
- John Exillus, Conrad's Paper-mill on the Wissahickon, abt 1813 (mentioned in Thomas Morton's History of Pennsylvania Hospital)
- Daniel Charles Grose, Spring on the Whissahickon and Autumn on the Whissahickon located at the Samuel Dorsky Museum of Art, State University of New York at New Paltz
- J. S. Hill, Through the Winter Woods Near the Wissahickon, 1874
- Charles W. Knapp, Boating on the Wissahickon, 1870
- John Moran, Devil's Glen in the Wissahickon, 1888
- John Moran, The Falls of Wissahickon Creek at Ridge Ave., 1888
- Thomas Moran (1837–1926), Autumn on the Wissahickon
- Thomas Moran (1837–1926), Cresheim Glen, Wissahickon, Autumn, 1864
- Thomas Moran (1837–1926), On the Wissahickon Near Chestnut Hill, 1870
- James Peale (1749–1831), View on the Wissahickon, 1828
- James Peale (1749–1831), View on the Wissahickon, 1830 (at the Philadelphia Museum of Art)
- James Peale (1749–1831), Wissahickon, n.d. (at Swarthmore College)
- James Peale (1749–1831), On the Wissahickon, 1830
- James Peale (1749–1831), View of the Wissahickon (waterfall)
- William Trost Richards (1833–1905), On the Wissahickon, 1870
- William Trost Richards (1833–1905), The Wissahickon, 1872
- William Thompson Russell Smith (1812–1896), Boating Party on the Wissahickon, 1836
- William Thompson Russell Smith (1812–1896), Rocks on the Wissahickon, 1839
- William Thompson Russell Smith (1812–1896), A Scene on the Wissahickon, 1842
- William Thompson Russell Smith (1812–1896), Wissahickon, 1857
- Thomas Sully (1783–1872), Wissahickon Creek, 1845
- Ron P. swegman (1967- ), Philadelphia on the Fl, 2005
- Rosa M. Towne (1827–1909), Sketch of Upper Wissahickon, Philadelphia, 1882
- Carl Philipp Weber, (Amer, b Germ, 1849–1921), Wissahickon Scene, n.d.
- Carl Philipp Weber, (Amer, b Germ, 1849–1921), Wissahickon Creek, 1877
- Carl Philipp Weber, (Amer, b Germ, 1849–1921), Spirit of the Wissahickon (lower bridge, Wissahickon valley)

There exists a Currier and Ives Scenery Of The Wissahickon

The Swann Memorial Fountain (1924), a fountain sculpture by Alexander Stirling Calder located in the center of Logan Circle, in Philadelphia, contains three large Native American figures that symbolize the area's major streams: the Delaware, the Schuylkill, and the Wissahickon. The young girl leaning on her side against an agitated, water-spouting swan represents the Wissahickon Creek.

== Gallery ==
Wissahickon Creek

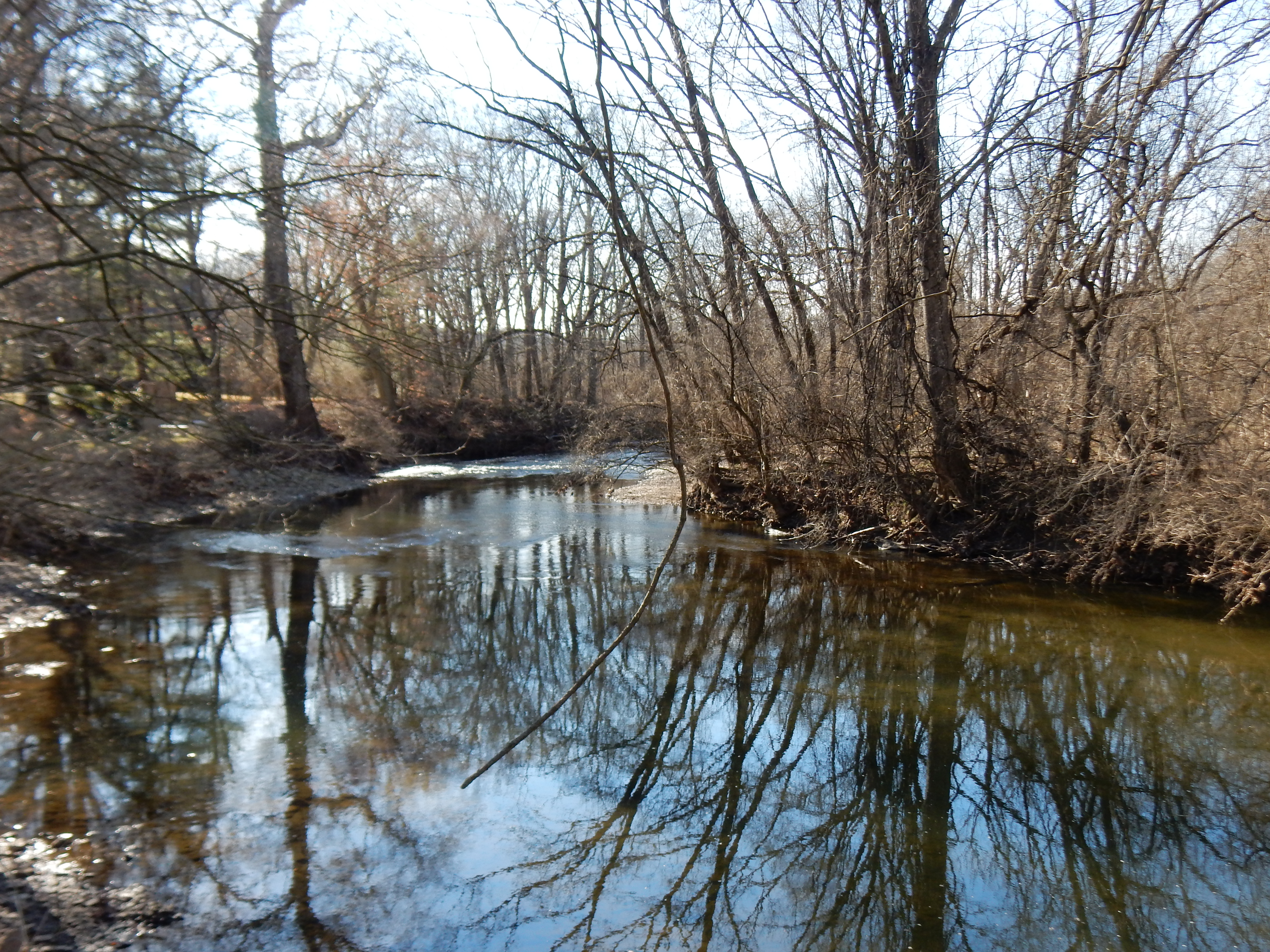
Wissahickon Creek in Morris Arboretum

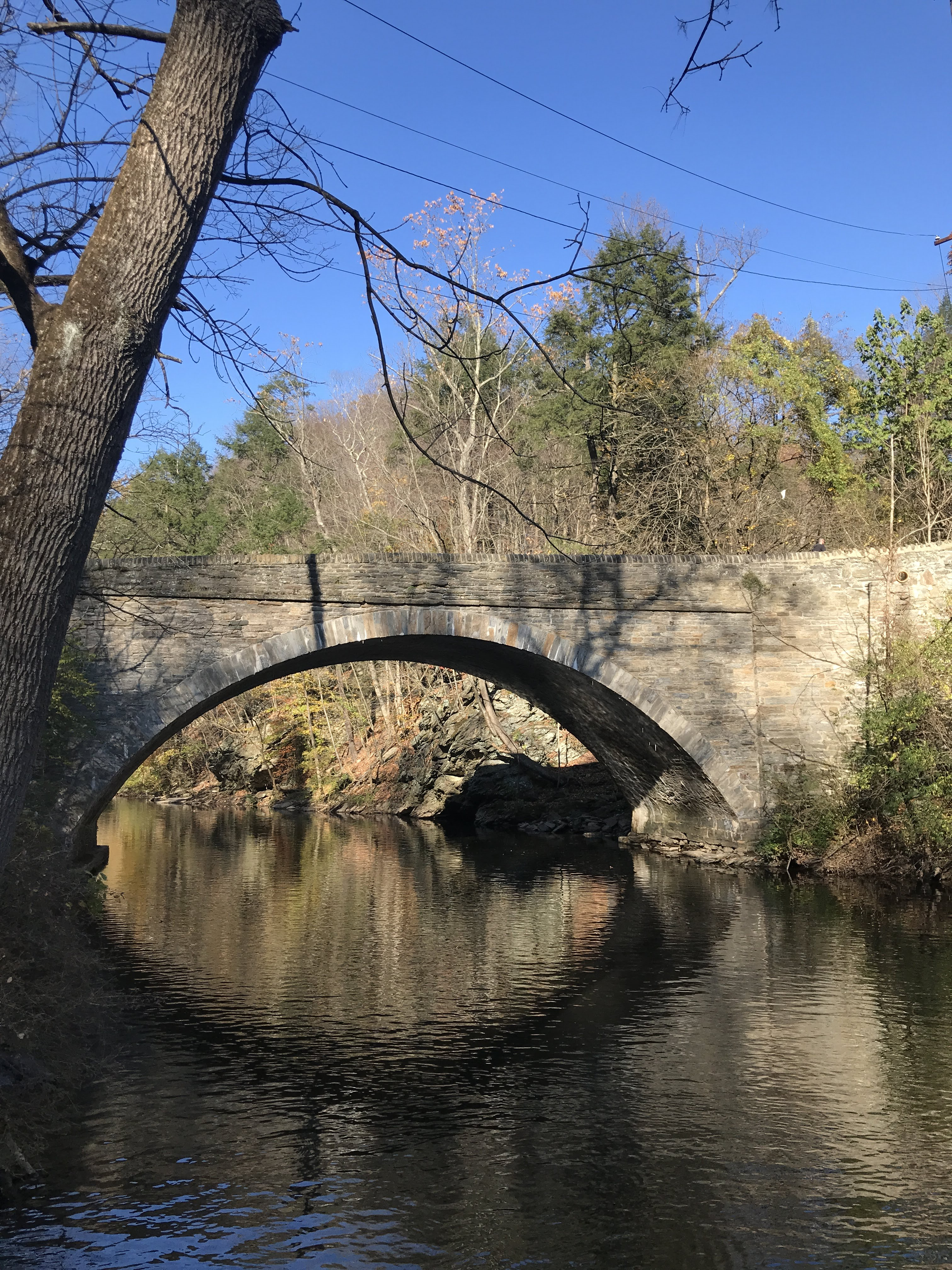
Valley Green Bridge facing the Valley Green Inn

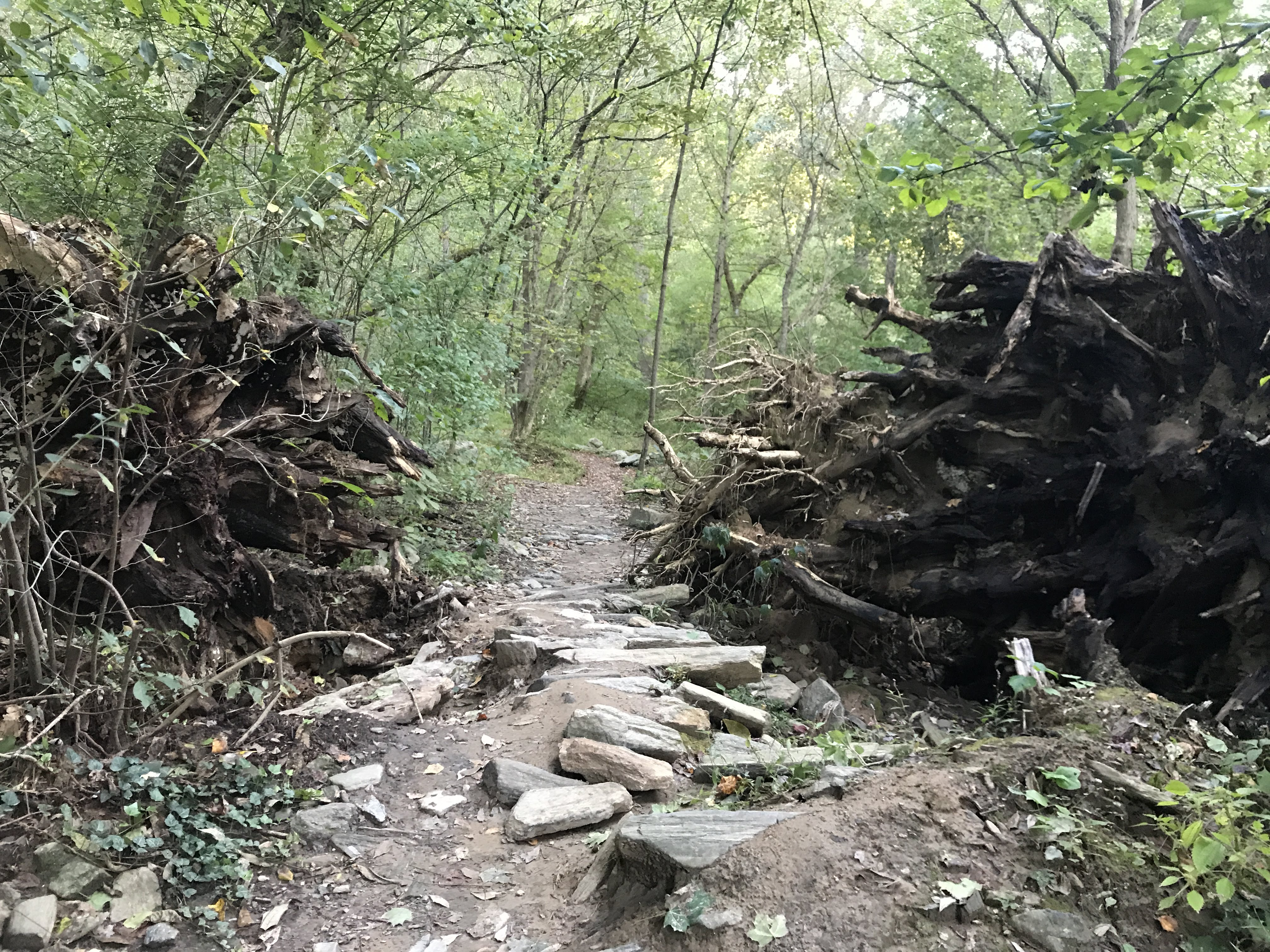
One of Wissahickons trails on the Chestnut Hill side

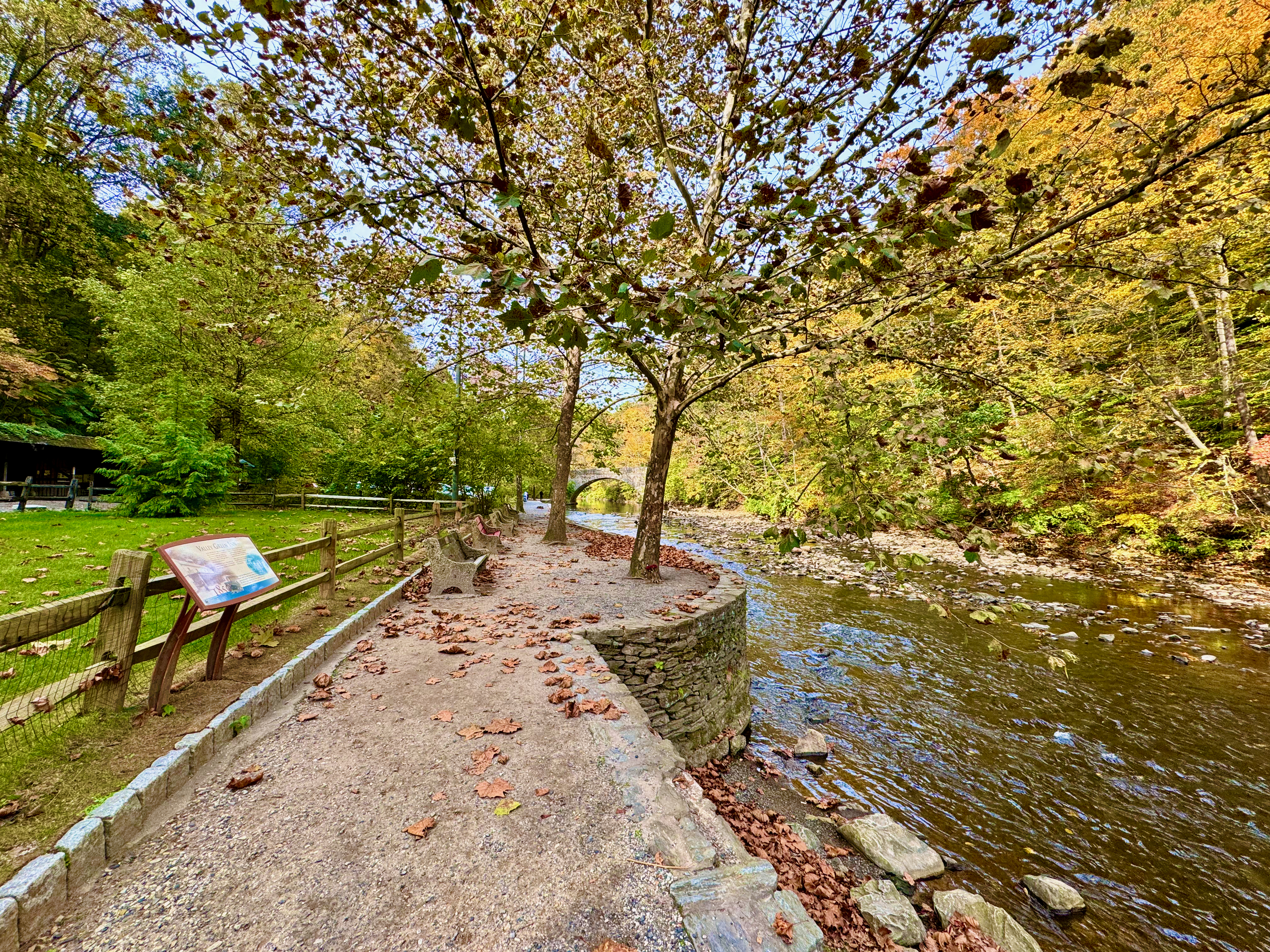
Wissahickon Creek in autumn near the Valley Green Inn

== See also ==
- Wissahickon Valley Park
- List of rivers of Pennsylvania
