= Blue Bell Hill (disambiguation) =

Blue Bell Hill is a chalk hill in the English county of Kent.

Blue Bell Hill may also refer to:

- Blue Bell Hill (Pennsylvania), a neighborhood in Philadelphia, Pennsylvania, United States
- Blue Bell Hill (village), a village in Kent, England

== See also ==
- Bluebell Hill transmitting station
- Blue Bell (disambiguation)
- Bell Hill (disambiguation)
- Blue Hill (disambiguation)
