= Blue Hills =

Blue Hills may refer to:

== Places ==
- Blue Hills, Queensland, a locality in the City of Townsville, Australia
- Sinimäed Hills (or "Blue Hills"), Estonia
- Blue Hills, Gauteng, a suburb of Johannesburg, South Africa
- Blue Hills, Turks and Caicos Islands, the highest point of the islands

=== United States ===
- Blue Hills (Washington), a range of hills
- Blue Hills, Connecticut, a suburb of Hartford
- Blue Hills, Kansas City, Missouri
- Blue Hills (New Jersey), foothills of the Watchung Mountains
- Blue Hills Reservation, Massachusetts, a state park
  - Blue Hills Ski Area
  - Great Blue Hill, the highest point in the reservation

== Other uses ==
- The Blue Hills (Estonian: Sinimäed), a 2006 Estonian film
- Blue Hills (radio serial), an Australian radio serial, run from 1949 until 1976, a spin-off of The Lawsons
- "Blue Hills of Massachusetts", the official poem of the Commonwealth of Massachusetts by Katherine E. Mullen
- Battle of Blue Hills, a 1944 battle between the German Army and the Soviet Leningrad Front

== See also ==
- Big Blue Hills, a mountain range in Fresno County, California
- Blue Hill (disambiguation)
