= Bell Hill =

Bell Hill or Bells Hill may refer to:

== Australia ==
- Bell Post Hill, Victoria
- Bells Hill, New South Wales

== New Zealand ==
- Bell Hill, New Zealand in central Dunedin

== United Kingdom ==
- Bell Hill, Dorset
- Bells Hill Burial Ground, in Barnet, London

== United States ==
- Bell Hill, Washington
- Bell Hill (Montana), a mountain in Richland County, Montana
- Bell Hill (Herkimer County, New York), an elevation in Herkimer County, New York

== See also ==
- Bellshill (disambiguation)
- Blue Bell Hill (disambiguation)
