= Bellshill (disambiguation) =

Bellshill is a suburb of Glasgow, Scotland.

Bellshill may also refer to:

- Bellshill, Alberta, Canada
- Bellshill, Northumberland, a village in England

== See also ==
- Bell Hill (disambiguation)
