= Blue Ball =

Blue Ball may refer to:

== Populated places ==
In the United States

- Blue Ball, Arkansas, an unincorporated community
- Blue Ball, Delaware, an unincorporated community
- Blue Ball Village, Maryland, an unincorporated community
- Blue Ball, Ohio, a community in Middletown
- Blue Ball, Pennsylvania, an unincorporated community

Elsewhere

- Blue Ball, County Offaly, Ireland

== Other meanings ==
- The Blue Ball, a 1995 play by Paul Godfrey
- Blue balls, testicular discomfort
- Blue Ball Inn, a pub in Cambridgeshire, England

== See also ==
- Big Blue Ball, an album by Peter Gabriel and others
