= William Rittenhouse =

American papermaker (1644–1708)

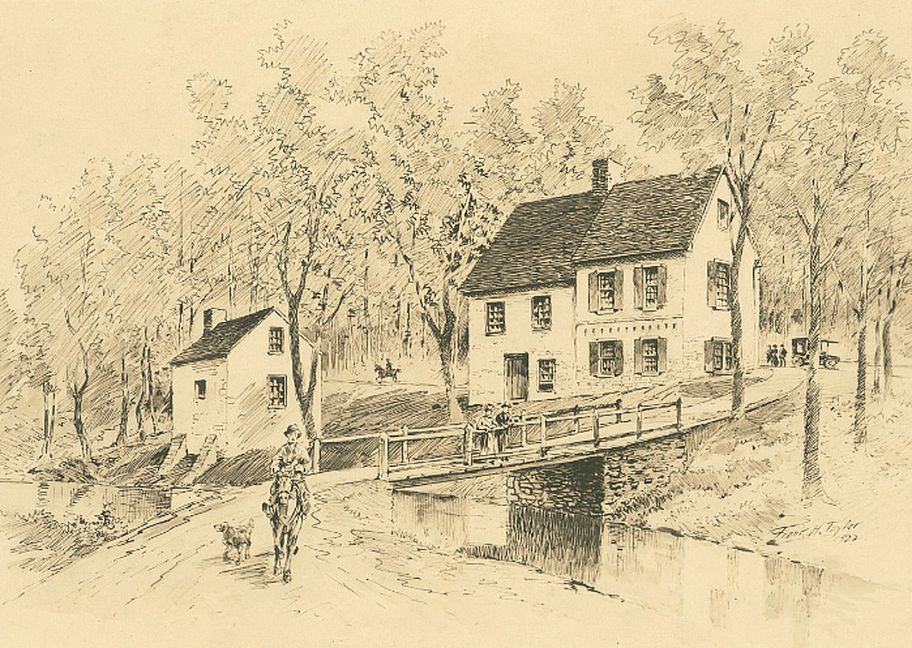
Rittenhouse established America's first paper mill on the Monoshone Creek

William Rittenhouse (1644 – 1708) was an American papermaker and businessman. He served as an apprentice papermaker in the Netherlands and, after moving to the Pennsylvania Colony, established the first paper mill in the North American colonies, helping to meet the growing demand for paper among the Early American publishers and printers. Rittenhouse married Geertruid Pieters of Eerbeck, Holland, in 1665, before emigrating to the Americas. Rittenhouse was also the first Mennonite bishop in America. Along with his two sons, and their descendants, the Rittenhouse family maintained a papermaking business in Pennsylvania for well over one hundred years. The site of the original mill is now preserved as the Historic RittenhouseTown district of Philadelphia.

== Early life ==
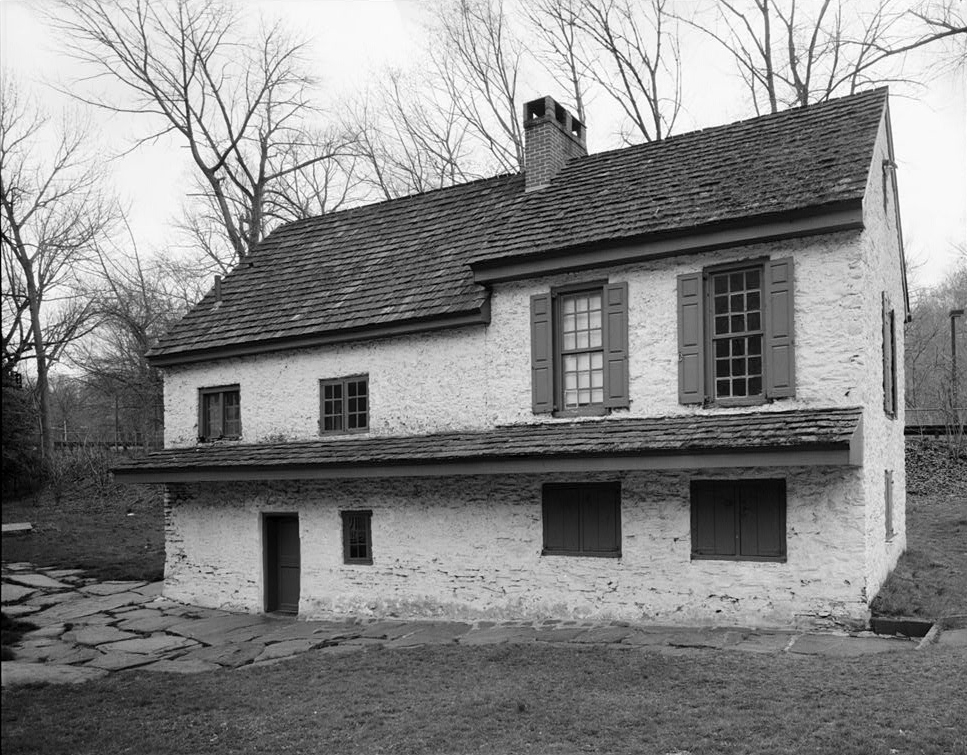
Rittenhouse's home, Paper Industry International Hall of Fame, 1996

William Rittenhouse was born Wilhelm Rettinghaus or Rittinghaus, in 1644 at the small village of Broich, just outside of Mülheim on the Ruhr River in the Ruhr region of Germany. He was the son of Claus Rittinghausen and Maria Hagerhoff. He belonged to a distinguished family of which various members held prominent standings in public and professional life. Several of his paternal ancestors were also papermakers in Holland and Germany. During his stay in the Netherlands he changed his name to "Willm Rittenhuysen". This name was also found on a petition dated 7 May 1691 for naturalization of residents of Germantown, Pennsylvania. Other residents of importance were Francis Daniel Pastorius, Derick, Herman and Abraham op den Graeff. (Note: Germantown became part of Philadelphia in 1854.) He was raised in a German-speaking household prior to his removal to the Netherlands where he remained for more than twenty years (from the early 1660s until his departure for Pennsylvania in 1688). He married Geertruid Pieters of Eerbeek, a Dutch woman, in 1665, and most likely became accustomed to speaking a second language. Their marriage produced a daughter, Elizabeth, and a son, Nicholas (also referred to by some as Claus), who also, along with his son, became papermakers continuing the family business into the 1800s. As a young man, William Rittenhouse was an apprentice papermaker in Germany where he learned the Dutch ways of papermaking while living with his brother in the Netherlands, before emigrating to the Pennsylvania Colony in 1688. Two years later he founded the first paper mill to be established in the colonies. This Rittenhouse Mill became the family business for the next century. At the age of 44 Rittenhouse moved to the British colonies in America for reasons that remain unclear, but the pursuit for a better livelihood and business opportunity was a constant factor to all immigration during that era. He became naturalized as a citizen of Pennsylvania (and therefore of England) in 1691.

== Ministry ==
Around 1690 the Germantown, Philadelphia, Pennsylvania, Mennonite congregation elected William Rittenhouse as its first minister of the church in Germantown, and the first Mennonite bishop in America. He died in Pennsylvania in 1708. His legacy continued to his descendant David Rittenhouse, who had the Rittenhouse name immortalized in Rittenhouse Square, Philadelphia, Pennsylvania.

== Premier paper mill ==
William Rittenhouse is widely noted for having established the first paper mill in North America, in 1690, in Pennsylvania, near Philadelphia. Along with a few business associates he rented land owned by Samuel Carpenter with a lease that extended for a term of 990 years. Here the paper mill was constructed and established because of the demand for badly needed paper by William Bradford, a prominent printer in Philadelphia. Rittenhouse was something of a carpenter, and did most of the mill's construction on his own. The mill was primarily constructed of logs on Monoshone Creek which empties into the Wissahickon Creek approximately one mile above its confluence with the Schuylkill River in the town of Roxborough. (Note: Roxborough was absorbed by the city of Philadelphia in 1854.) This stream still bears the name of Paper Mill Run. Sometime during the winter of 1700-1701 the wooden structure was destroyed and taken away by violent and sudden flooding of the river, taking with it a sizeable quantity of paper, tools and other materials. In 1702 a second and larger mill made of stone, with a more efficient overshot mill wheel, was built nearby. Completed on June 30, 1704, Rittenhouse became the sole owner of the mill. After some time this mill proved to be too small for the increase in business, which prompted Rittenhouse to build another mill of stone, which was larger than the existing mill. In 1712, Thomas Willcox, who had just arrived in the colonies in America from England applied for work at Rittenhouse's mill, but the paper mill business was still young and slow to get established and Willcox was declined. He went on, however, to establish his own paper mill at nearby Chester Creek in 1729.

After the purchase of a printing press and type, the chief expense for a printer was the cost of paper. The printer and the papermaker relationship made for an ideal partnership that provided the basis for Rittenhouse to establish his paper mill and the new found industry in a field that had not yet been pursued by anyone else in the colonies. Prior to this time very few, if any, of the American colonists, who were mostly from England and Holland, knew much about the craft of papermaking. The center of the paper making industry in colonial America was in and around Philadelphia and Delaware County. Its development elsewhere was very spread out until well into the 19th century. Rittenhouse began producing paper for William Bradford, the first printer in the middle colonies, (Note: Not to be confused with William Bradford (American Revolutionary printer)) who had helped him in the effort of getting his paper mill established by procuring the plot of land, which at the time was of little value. Bradford also provided the molds used to lay paper and other wares and furniture for the mill. In that capacity Bradford became a junior partner with Rittenhouse and controlled a quarter share in the Rittenhouse mill from its beginning until 1704, during the time when he was living in New York at the end of this period. (Note: Other junior partners included Robert Turner and Thomas Tresse. The exact terms of the partnership are not known.) Rittenhouse's mill had as a steady customer at least one printer, William Bradford, a prominent and successful printer of Philadelphia. Rittenhouse expanded his paper making into a family business which continued to succeed for many years.

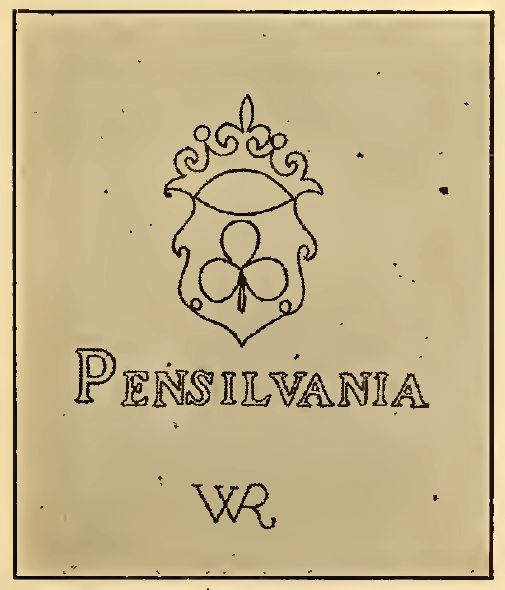
Illustration of an early watermark used on paper produced by William Rittenhouse (Note: An actual watermark can only be seen when the paper is held up to a light, or via X-ray detection, the letters and other markings being a slight shade lighter in appearance than the paper.)

Most if not all the paper made in the Rittenhouse mills was watermarked. The first watermark to be used bore the single word Company. The second watermark, its size covering nearly the full sheet of paper, consisted of the monogram W R along with half a shield, surmounted by a fleur-de-lis crest, and bearing a clover leaf—which happened to be the town seal of Germantown, and beneath the emblem the word "Pensilvania" was inscribed. Rittenhouse's sons as his successors in the papermaking business would also continue the practice using watermarks on the paper they produced. (Note: For more in-depth coverage, and X-ray photos, of the Rittenhouse watermarks, see John Bidwell's 2013 work, American Paper Mills, 1690-1832:)

The newspapers of William Bradford, the New-York Gazette, established in November 1725, and that of his son Andrew Bradford, the American Weekly Mercury, established in 1719 in Philadelphia, were printed on paper produced in the Rittenhouse paper mill, which bore the Rittenhouse watermarks.

== Final years and legacy ==
William Rittenhouse died in 1708, at the age of 64. Shortly before his death he gave his share in the paper mill to his son Nicholas, who continued with the business until May 1734, when he died. Nicholas deeded the paper mill to his oldest son William Rittenhouse, and when he died the mill property fell to his son Jacob Rittenhouse, also a papermaker, who carried on the business, and died in 1811. William is buried in the Mennonite churchyard in Germantown, Pennsylvania, above Herman Street. After William's death, his son, Nicholas, succeeded him as Bishop. The Rittenhouse firm helped pioneer the North American pulp and paper industry.

== See also ==
- Early American publishers and printers
- List of early American publishers and printers

== Bibliography ==
- Bidwell, John (2013). American Paper Mills, 1690-1832. Dartmouth College Press. ISBN 978-1-6116-83165. Alternative link
- Cassell, Daniel Kolb (1893). A Genea-biographical History of the Rittenhouse Family. Rittenhouse Memorial Association. ISBN 978-0-598-99841-5.
- Erben, Patrick (2018) [2011]. Marianne S. Wokeck (ed.). "William Rittenhouse". Immigrant Entrepreneurship: German-American Business Biographies, 1720 to the Present, volume 1.
- Hunter, David (1978). Papermaking: The History and Technique of an Ancient Craft. Courier Corporation. ISBN 978-0-4862-36193.
- Jones, Horatio Gates; Rÿttinghousen, Claus; Bradford, Will (1896). "Historical Sketch of the Rittenhouse Papermill; The First Erected in America, A.D. 1690". The Pennsylvania Magazine of History and Biography. 20 (3). University of Pennsylvania Press: 315–333. JSTOR 20085701.
- Maxson, John W. Jr. (April 1968). "Papermaking in America From Art to Industry, 1690 to 1860". The Quarterly Journal of the Library of Congress. 25 (2). Library of Congress: 116–129. JSTOR 29781303.
- Thomas, Isaiah (1874). The history of printing in America, with a biography of printers. Vol. I. New York, B. Franklin.
- Weeks, Lyman Horace (1916). A history of paper-manufacturing in the United States, 1690-1916. New York, The Lockwood trade journal company.
- Wroth, Lawrence C. (1938). The Colonial Printer. Portland, Me., The Southworth-Anthoensen press.

=== Further reading ===
- "William Rittenhouse." Historic Germantown. Independence Hall Association. December 12, 2007
- Bender, Harold S.; "The Founding of the Mennonite Church in America at Germantown, 1683-1708;" Mennonite Quarterly Review; Vol. 7; pp. 227–250.
- White, Jean M. "The Descendants of Paulus and Gertrude Kusters of Kaldenkirchen, Germany and Germantown, Pennsylvania the first four generations"; The Caster Association of America; 1991
- Erich Kuß: Rittinghaus. Europäische Wurzeln des ersten amerikanischen Papiermachers. München, 2012.
