= Walnut Lane Bridge =

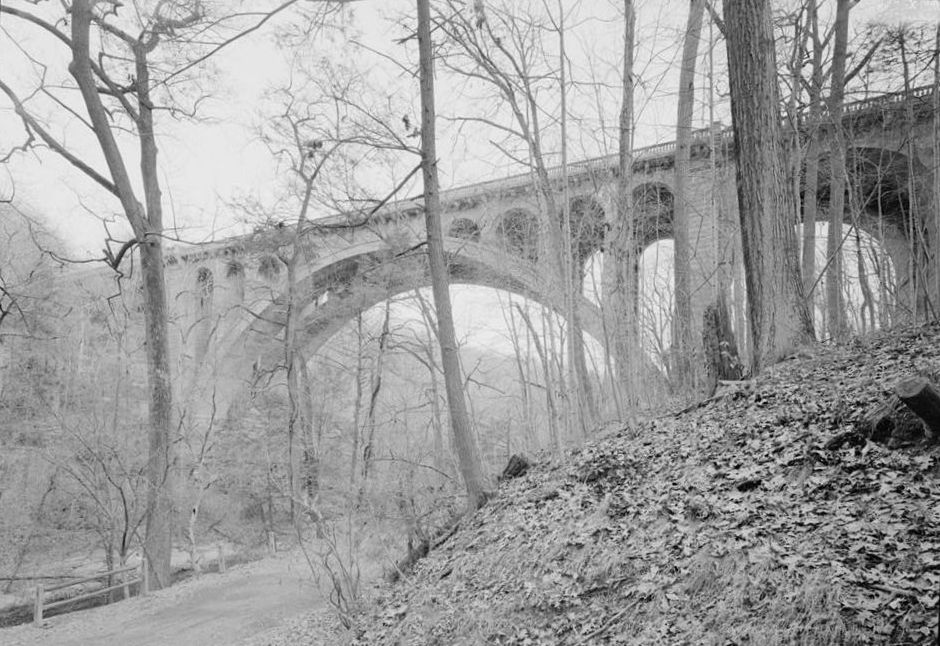
- Coordinates: 40°01′55″N 75°12′00″W
- Crosses: Wissahickon Creek
- Locale: Philadelphia, Pennsylvania
- Maintained by: City of Philadelphia

Characteristics
- Design: concrete
- Total length: 585 feet (178 m)
- Width: 48 feet (15 m)
- Height: 147 feet (45 m)
- Longest span: 233 feet (71 m)

History
- Construction cost: $260,000 ($5 Million Today)
- Opened: October 14, 1908
- Walnut Lane Bridge
- U.S. National Register of Historic Places
- Philadelphia Register of Historic Places
- Pennsylvania state historical marker
- Location: Philadelphia, Pennsylvania; United States
- Coordinates: 40°01′56″N 75°11′59″W
- Built: 1907
- Architect: George S. Webster (chief); Henry H. Quimby (assistant)
- NRHP reference No.: 88000815

Significant dates
- Added to NRHP: May 10, 1988
- Designated PHMC: October 18, 2008

Location
- Interactive map of Walnut Lane Bridge

The Walnut Lane Bridge is a concrete arch bridge located in Northwest Philadelphia that connects the Germantown and Roxborough neighborhoods across the Wissahickon Creek in Fairmount Park. While drivers may cross the bridge too quickly to notice, the view from underneath the bridge has inspired many artists and writers, such as Christopher Morley. The design was copied from Pont Adolphe in Luxembourg.

The Walnut Lane Bridge was added to the National Register of Historic Places in 1988.

== Construction ==
Construction began on July 5, 1906, and was completed on October 14, 1908. Over 40,000 tons of rubble concrete (containing a great amount of large stones, for greater shear strength) were poured into the falsework, which had been built from steel bents 20 feet (6.1 m) high and 370,000 board feet (870 m^{3}) of timber, weighing about 900 tons. The bridge's six spans total 585 ft in length (178 m). Very little use was made of reinforcing steel, which was scarce at the time. The roadway is 40 ft (12 m) wide, flanked by 10-foot (3.0 m) reinforced-concrete sidewalks and pre-cast concrete balustrades.

The chief engineer was George S. Webster, assisted by Henry Quimby, both of the Philadelphia Department of Public Works. At the time of its construction, the bridge was the longest and highest concrete arch bridge in the world. While $240,000 was originally committed to the project, the figure rose to nearly $260,000 by completion (equivalent to nearly $6 million in 2008).

== City Beautiful Movement ==
The bridge was a direct product of the City Beautiful Movement in Philadelphia in the early years of the 20th century. Seeking to provide community harmony and cooperation through improved public spaces, the bridge was viewed as an achievement that could unite the communities and cultures of Roxborough and Germantown in addition to inspiring a greater civic engagement. It was also believed that more beautiful construction techniques could help to reform a corrupt political system within the city. The Philadelphia community members rallied around the construction of the bridge and the opening was highly anticipated by all ages alike.

== Opening ==
The bridge was opened on October 14, 1908, and was formally dedicated on December 16 of the same year. Students from nearby schools participated in the dedication ceremony by marching toward the middle of the bridge and singing "Hail Philadelphia." The ceremony ended with a reception at a local inn with the traditional Wissahickon meal of catfish and waffles.

== Tragedy at the Walnut Lane Bridge ==
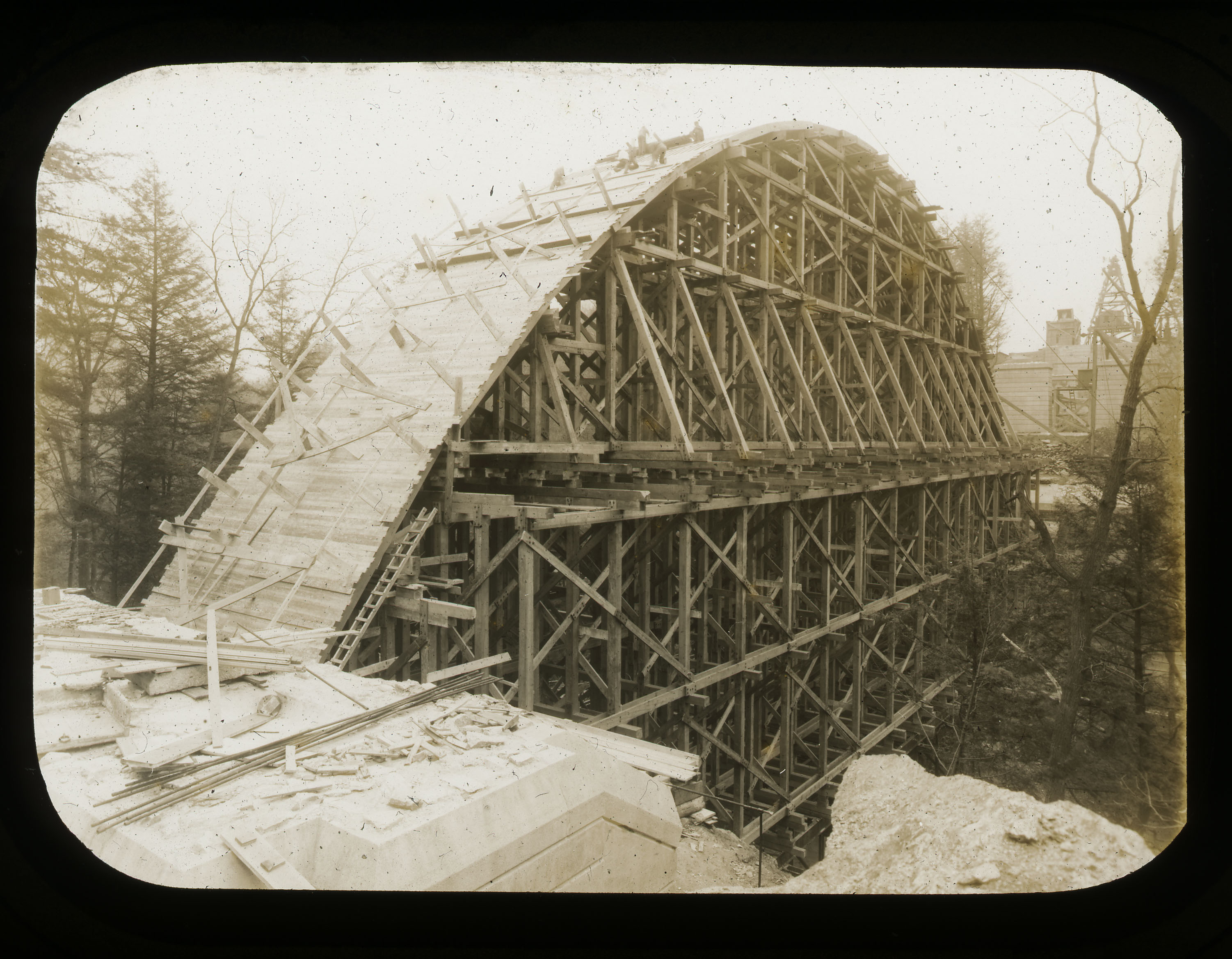
A lantern slide showing the construction of the Walnut Lane Bridge.

The Walnut Lane Bridge has a history of tragedies and deaths since construction began in 1906. In December 1907, the falsework (used to support the forms for pouring concrete) collapsed and sent about 20 workers plunging 150 feet (46 m) into the Wissahickon Creek. Martin Simpson was listed as the only worker to die during the tragedy while Bernard Mers lost an arm and James Lawson had both of his hands crushed. The crash drew neighbors out of their homes, as the sound could be heard throughout the valley.

Throughout the rest of the 20th century, stories of car crashes and suicides abound for the Walnut Lane Bridge. It was a common occurrence to see pictures of the bridge in the newspapers with a dotted line showing the path of a person's fall.

== Centennial celebration ==
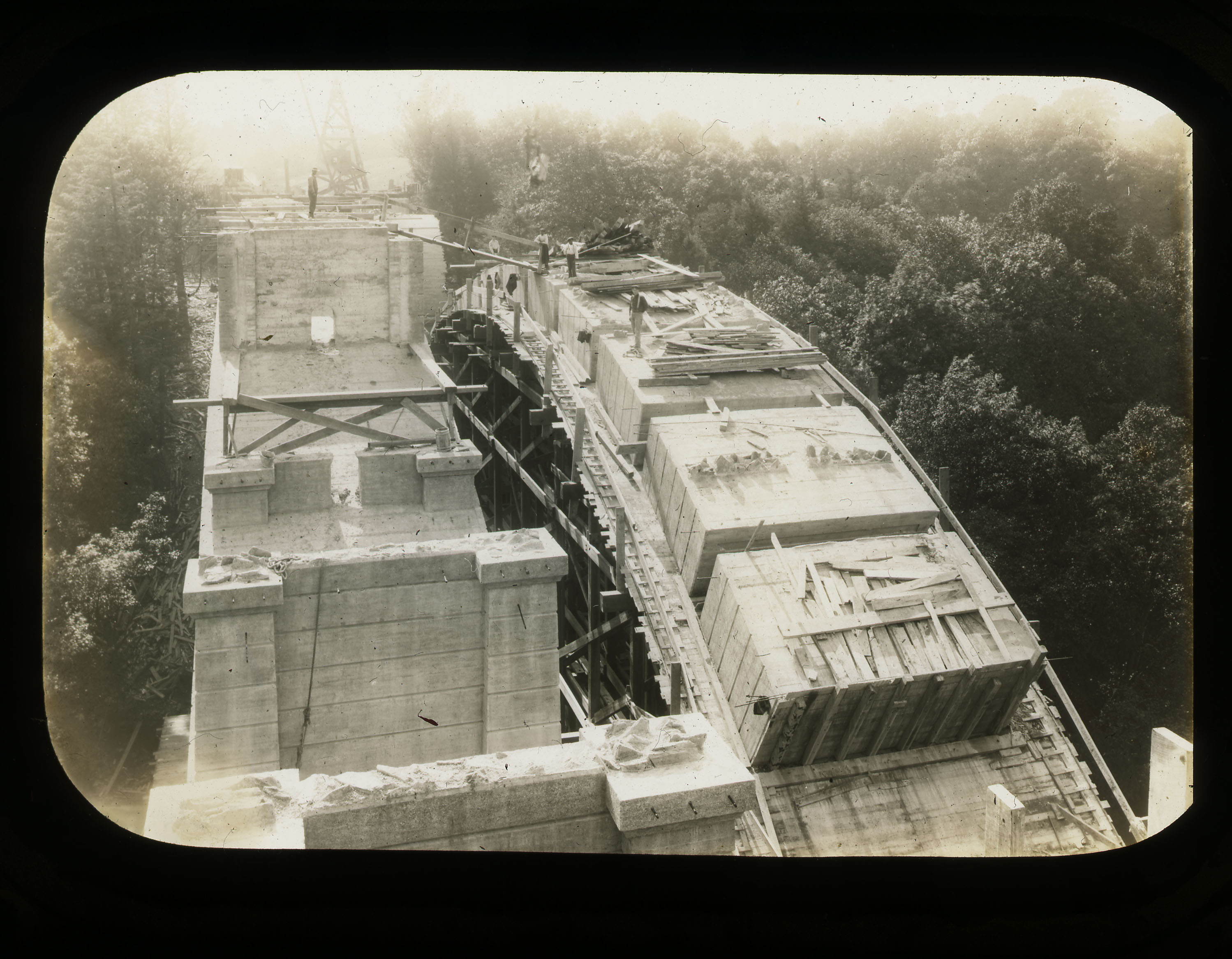
A rare lantern slide which will be part of the Walnut Lane Bridge Centennial exhibition.

In 2008, Cliveden, a National Historic Landmark and museum in Germantown owned by the National Trust for Historic Preservation, celebrated the 100th anniversary of the completion of the bridge. Only a few blocks from the Walnut Lane Bridge, Cliveden hosted an exhibition and educational program on the construction of the bridge, featuring a collection of rare lantern slides. The exhibit ran from May through October.

== Other bridges confused with the Walnut Lane Bridge ==
The Walnut Lane Bridge is often confused with other bridges in Philadelphia that are similar in name and construction. The Walnut Street Bridge crosses the Schuylkill River and connects University City, Philadelphia and Center City, Philadelphia. The nearby Wissahickon Memorial Bridge (aka Henry Avenue Bridge), which connects the East Falls and Roxborough neighborhoods of Philadelphia, is also often mistaken for the Walnut Lane Bridge. But the bridge most often confused with the Walnut Lane Bridge is the Walnut Lane Memorial Bridge, which replaced a cast-iron bridge over the Monoshone Creek and Lincoln Drive in Philadelphia in 1950 and is world-famous as a pre-stressed, post-tension concrete bridge.

== See also ==
- List of bridges documented by the Historic American Engineering Record in Pennsylvania
- Adolphe Bridge, a bridge in Luxembourg built in 1903 that served as model for the Walnut Lane Bridge.
