= Blue Bell Hill (Pennsylvania) =

Neighborhood in Philadelphia, Pennsylvania, United States

Coordinates: 40°02′07″N 75°11′34″W

- Neighborhood of Philadelphia
- Interactive map of Blue Bell Hill
- Country: United States
- State: Pennsylvania
- County: Philadelphia County
- City: Philadelphia
- Area codes: 215, 267 and 445

Blue Bell Hill is a small neighborhood in Philadelphia, Pennsylvania, United States. The neighborhood is home to multiple historic buildings including RittenhouseTown Historic District and Thomas Mansion. Blue Bell Park is located in this neighborhood.

== See also ==
- List of Philadelphia neighborhoods
