= Daniel Charles Grose =

American painter

- Born: Daniel Charles Grose; 21 March 1832; Whitby, Yorkshire, England
- Died: 24 February 1900 (aged 67); Alexandria, Virginia, U.S.
- Known for: Painter
- Movement: Romanticism, Hudson River School

Daniel Charles Grose (1832 – 1900) was a prolific Canadian-American painter of the Hudson River School who was active between 1864 and 1900. Primarily known for his pastoral landscapes, on occasion he also created marine views. Somewhat at variance from these were his scenes of India, perhaps the most coveted during his lifetime. An inveterate traveller, he painted scenes across eastern Canada and throughout the United States, in addition to countries abroad.

== Biography ==
Daniel Charles Grose was born in 1832 in Whitby, England. He was one of a half-dozen children born to Daniel Henderson and Sarah Rachel Grose.

The Grose family were actors and performers who travelled throughout the north of England for most of the 1830s and 1840s. Truly a family affair, a London paper in 1843 described a theatre under the management of Mr [Daniel Henderson] Grose as appearing to "have a gross of little Groses, who constitute his company."

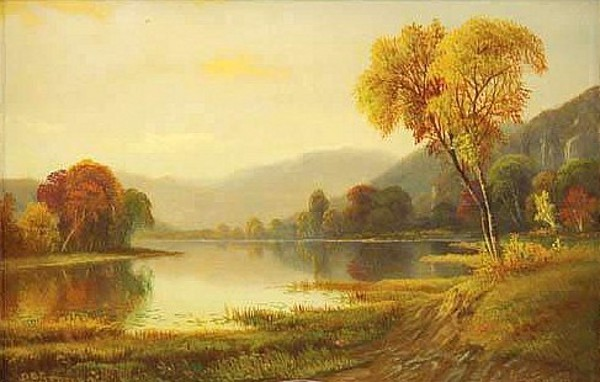
Fall in the Northeast

After serving in the Merchant Navy in the early 1850s, Grose married his first wife, Louisa Askew, on June 8, 1856, at Chatham, Kent, England. At the start of the Indian Rebellion of 1857, Grose was employed as a professor in a military staff college. As a lieutenant in the Royal East India Engineer Corps, he volunteered for active duty and served until the rebellion was suppressed.

He was living with his in-laws in England in 1861 but by 1865 he and his wife had moved to Toronto, Province of Canada where he seems to have described himself for the first time as an artist. By 1868, Grose and Louisa had moved to Brooklyn, New York, where he lived extensively throughout the rest of his life. Louisa died in either 1875 or 1876. While visiting his family in Canada in 1875, Grose married his second wife Molly or Mary Jane White. This second marriage was not a happy one and after a couple of years they separated. Mary returned to her family in New Brunswick, but soon went back to New York where she died in 1881 of "exhaustion due to acute mania."

On May 25, 1881, in Washington, D.C., Grose married Harriet Estella Smith (1863–1914), also an artist. Between 1881 and 1884 Grose and Harriet took a trip around the world. They moved back to Brooklyn but continued travelling nearly until his death, leaving New York again in 1895 and not returning from Australia until 1898. Grose died in Alexandria, Virginia, at his mother-in-law's house (Mrs. H Dwight Smith) on February 24, 1900. His funeral was held the next day in Washington at his former residence. His wife Harriet died in Brooklyn, New York on October 6, 1914.

== Painting career ==
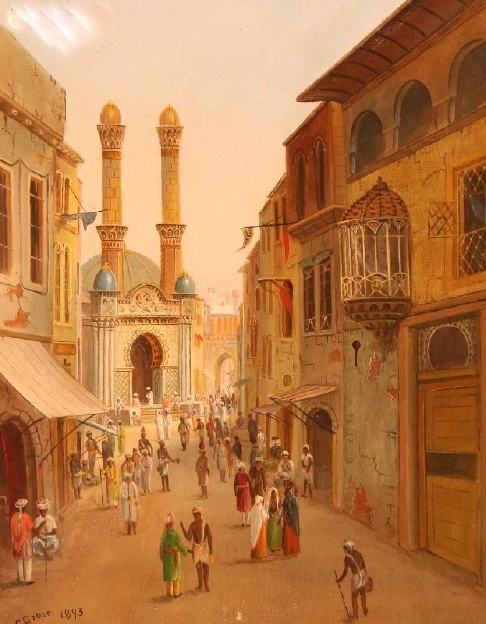
Scene in India

Grose studied at the Royal Academy of Arts. The earliest known Grose works are dated 1864 and 1865 and consist of a series of landscapes in the province of Quebec. These have been described as primitive oil paintings in the Romantic style.

He sketched and painted in the northeastern United States, including Maine, the Hudson River Valley, The White Mountains NH, and Connecticut. He also continued to work in adjacent Canadian provinces. Grose was active as a painter in the Rocky Mountains area from the 1860s to the 1880s. Other American locations included Florida and the Grand Canyon. Some of his works deriving from his travels to India were highly rated by contemporaries, and his painting Lalla Rookh was particularly celebrated. Grose was evidently successful as most of his canvases were sold before he completed them.

Grose was a member of the Brooklyn Art Association, where he exhibited in 1869 and 1875. The majority of Grose's work depicts pastoral landscapes, or romantic scenes with ruins. He was also adept at marine views. His style indicates an affinity to the second generation of the Hudson River School (ca. 1848–1900). The Samuel Dorksy Museum of Art lists two of his works, seasonal views of Wissahickon Creek in Pennsylvania, as examples of the Hudson school.

== Collections ==
- Musée national des beaux-arts du Québec (MNBAQ)
- Samuel Dorsky Museum of Art
- McMaster Museum of Art

== Selected works ==
=== Dated ===
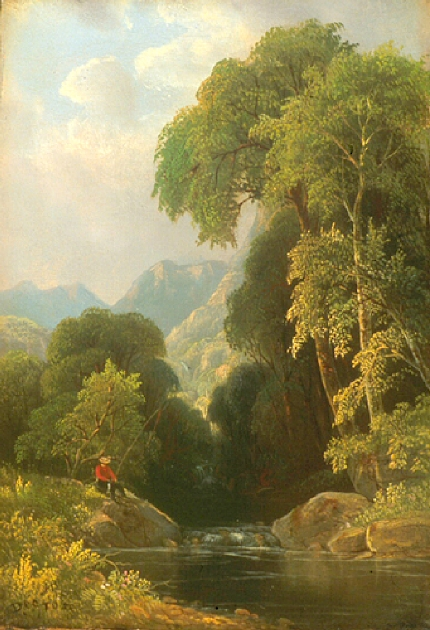
Spring on the Whissahickon

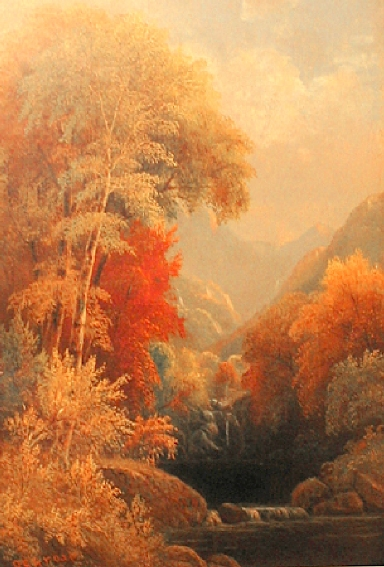
Autumn on the Whissahickon

1864:

- River Landscape - oil on canvas 9" x 12" - signed - dated

1865:

- Le Lac Beauport – oil on canvas – signed – dated
- Quebec from Charlesbourg – oil on canvas – signed – dated
- Afternoon by the Falls – oil on canvas – signed – dated
- River Landscape 1 – oil on canvas – signed – dated
- River Landscape 2 – oil on canvas – signed – dated
- Lac de Deux Montages – oil on canvas – signed – dated – (Montreal)
- Quebec Rapids – oil on canvas – signed – dated
- Duck Shooting from a Boat – oil on canvas – signed – dated – (Montreal)
- Paysage dans les Laurentides – oil on canvas – signed – dated
- Paysage dans les Laurentides– oil on canvas – signed – dated
- La Pêche à la nigogue – oil on canvas – signed – dated

1867:

- Mill Dam - oil on canvas – signed – dated – (Philadelphia)

1870:

- Moghul Palace in a Landscape - oil on canvas – signed – dated

1874:

- Autumnal Sunset Over a Mill - oil on canvas – signed – dated
- Paysage des environs de Québec (?) – oil on canvas – signed – dated

1875:

- Trading on the Plains - oil on canvas – signed

1876:

- Landscape with Fields and Distant Hills - oil on canvas – signed – dated

1877:

- Mt. Katahdin – oil on canvas – signed - dated

1886:

- La Mauvaise Rivière, Saint-Raymond de Portneuf – oil on canvas – signed – dated
- La Rivière Sainte-Anne, Saint-Raymond de Portneuf – oil on canvas – signed – dated

1887:

- Autumn, Hudson River Valley - oil on canvas – signed – dated
- The Old City of Delhi - oil on canvas – signed – dated
- Winter Sleigh Ride - oil on canvas – signed – dated

1895:

- River Landscape with Village - oil on canvas – signed – dated

=== Undated ===
- Autumn in the Whites, NH
- Lake Scene with Waterfall & Distant Mountains
- Fisherman in a Landscape
- River Scene
- Lakeside Landscape
- Waterfall in the West
- A Romantic View of Bridal Veil Falls, Yosemite Valley California
- View of North Conway, New Hampshire
- Waterfall
- River Landscape with Village
- River Landscape
- A View In The White Mountains
- A View In Maryland
- Skating Scene
- Spring on the Wissahickon
- Autumn on the Wissahickon

== Gallery ==
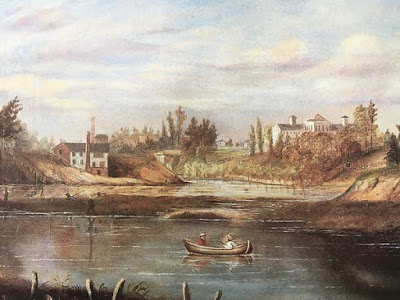
Don River, Toronto

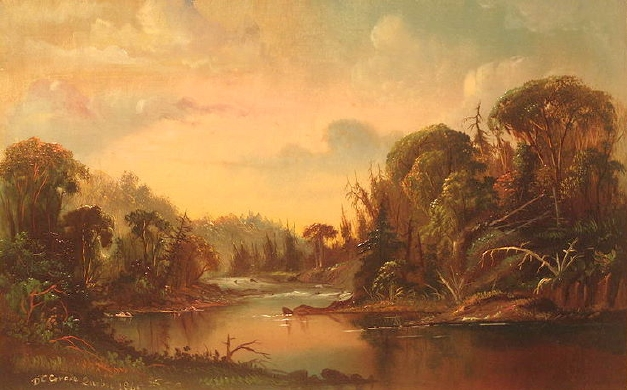
Quebec Rapids

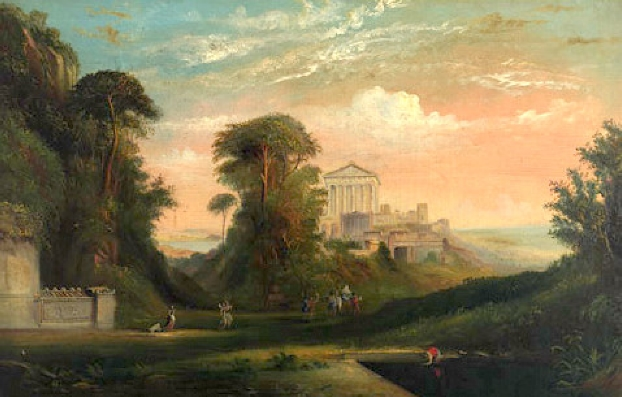
Figures Dancing in a Landscape with Ruins

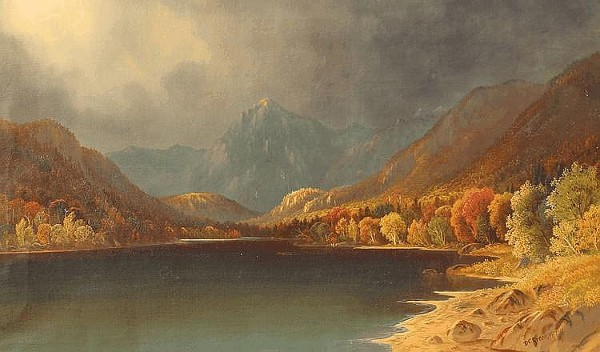
Lakeside Landscape

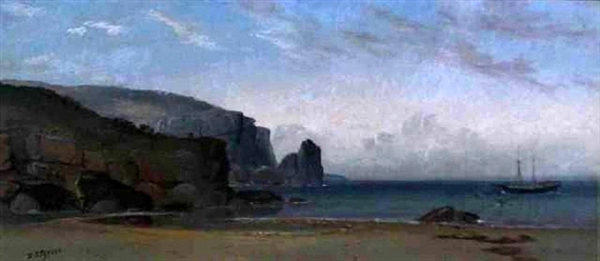
Aground on the Australian Coast
