= Rosa M. Towne =

American artist (c. 1827–1909)

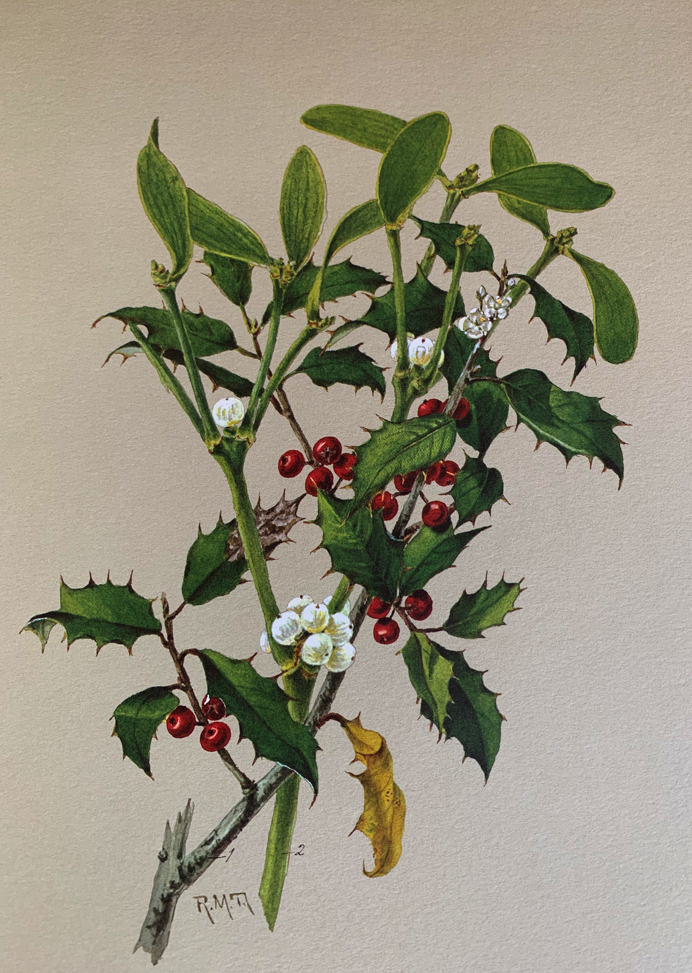
- Towne's depictions of holly and mistletoe
- Born: 1827
- Died: December 3, 1909 (aged 81–82)
- Occupation: Artist
- Relatives: Ann Sophia Towne Darrah, Laura Matilda Towne, John Henry Towne

Rosa M. Towne (c. 1827 – December 3, 1909) was an American painter.

Rosa M. Towne was born in about 1827, the daughter of John Towne, a wealthy businessman, and Sarah Robinson Towne. Her siblings included artist Ann Sophia Towne Darrah, educator Laura Matilda Towne, and engineer John Henry Towne.

Towne is best known for her botanical watercolors. Between 1888 and 1898, Towne completed 73 paintings of 182 plants, all of the plants mentioned in the works of Shakespeare. Oakes Ames purchased them for the Harvard Botanical Museum and his successor Richard Evans Schultes published reproductions of them as Plant Lore of Shakespeare (1974).

John Henry Towne built a memorial fountain in Jenkintown, Pennsylvania dedicated to her work with the Society for the Prevention of Cruelty to Animals.

Rosa M. Towne died on December 3, 1909.
