= Wissahickon Memorial Bridge =

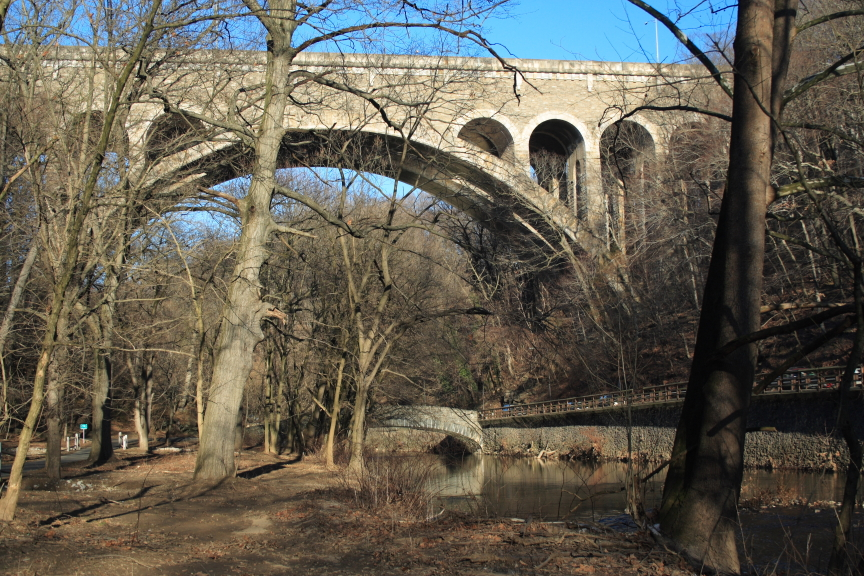
- Coordinates: 40°01′26″N 75°11′46″W
- Crosses: Wissahickon Creek
- Locale: Philadelphia, Pennsylvania
- Maintained by: City of Philadelphia

Characteristics
- Total length: 333 feet (101 m)
- Width: 60 feet (18 m)
- Height: 170 feet (52 m)
- Longest span: 288 feet (88 m)

History
- Construction cost: $1,648,775
- Opened: May 1932
- Wissahickon Memorial Bridge
- U.S. National Register of Historic Places
- Philadelphia Register of Historic Places
- Location within Philadelphia Location within Pennsylvania Location within the United States
- Location: Henry Avenue over Wissahickon Creek and Lincoln Drive; Philadelphia, Pennsylvania
- Coordinates: 40°1′27″N 75°11′46″W
- Built: 1931
- Architects: Paul Philippe Cret, Ralph Modjeski
- MPS: Highway Bridges Owned by the Commonwealth of Pennsylvania, Department of Transportation TR
- NRHP reference No.: 88000807
- Added to NRHP: June 22, 1988

Location
- Interactive map of Wissahickon Memorial Bridge

The Wissahickon Memorial Bridge, originally called and still also known as the Henry Avenue Bridge, is a stone and concrete bridge that carries Henry Avenue over Wissahickon Creek and Lincoln Drive in Fairmount Park in Philadelphia, Pennsylvania.

== History ==
It is a two-ribbed, open-spandrel, reinforced concrete arch bridge with one principal span. It was designed in 1927 by Paul Philippe Cret, a nationally acclaimed Philadelphia architect, in collaboration with Frank M. Masters, engineered by Ralph Modjeski and Clement E. Chase.

It was completed in May 1932 at a cost of $1,648,775. It was designed to accommodate a lower deck, never constructed, to be used by trolleys or a subway extension to Roxborough. Shortly after its completion, it was renamed the Wissahickon Memorial Bridge and was dedicated to the people of Philadelphia's northwest neighborhoods who served in World War I.

The bridge is 333 feet long, with a main span of 288 feet. Its 60-ft-wide roadway carries two lanes of traffic in each direction. The roadway is approximately 170 feet above the ground. The bridge was repaved and repaired between 2008 and late 2010.

The bridge has been known as a suicide bridge since its opening. Beginning in 1941 for an unknown duration of time a policeman patrolled the span, questioning all pedestrians walking the bridge.

It was listed on the National Register of Historic Places in 1988. The bridge was featured as a filming location in the 1981 film Blow Out starring John Travolta and directed by Brian De Palma.

== See also ==
- List of bridges documented by the Historic American Engineering Record in Pennsylvania
- Walnut Lane Bridge
