= Blueberry Hill (disambiguation) =

Blueberry Hill is a 1940 song popularized by Glenn Miller and later by Fats Domino.

Blueberry Hill may also refer to:

- Live on Blueberry Hill, also known as Blueberry Hill, a 1970 bootleg recording of Led Zeppelin
- Blueberry Hill (1988 film), by Strathford Hamilton
- Blueberry Hill, 1989 film by Robbe De Hert
- Blueberry Hill (restaurant), in the St. Louis, Missouri area
- Blueberry Hill (Alaska), the northernmost point of the coastal Pacific temperate rain forest located in Valdez, Alaska
- Blue Berry Hill, Texas
- Blueberry Hill (Durham, North Carolina), gay bar
