= Blue Bell, South Dakota =

Unincorporated community in Custer County, South Dakota, US

Coordinates: 43°43′00″N 103°28′57″W

Blue Bell is an unincorporated community in Custer County, in the U.S. state of South Dakota.

== History ==
A post office called Blue Bell was established in 1932, and remained in operation until 1941. The community derives its name from the bluebell flowers native to the area. Blue Bell is also the name of a public recreational lodge established here in 1925.
