= Paper Mill Run =

Creek in Philadelphia, Pennsylvania

Coordinates: 40.030773°N 75.188467°W

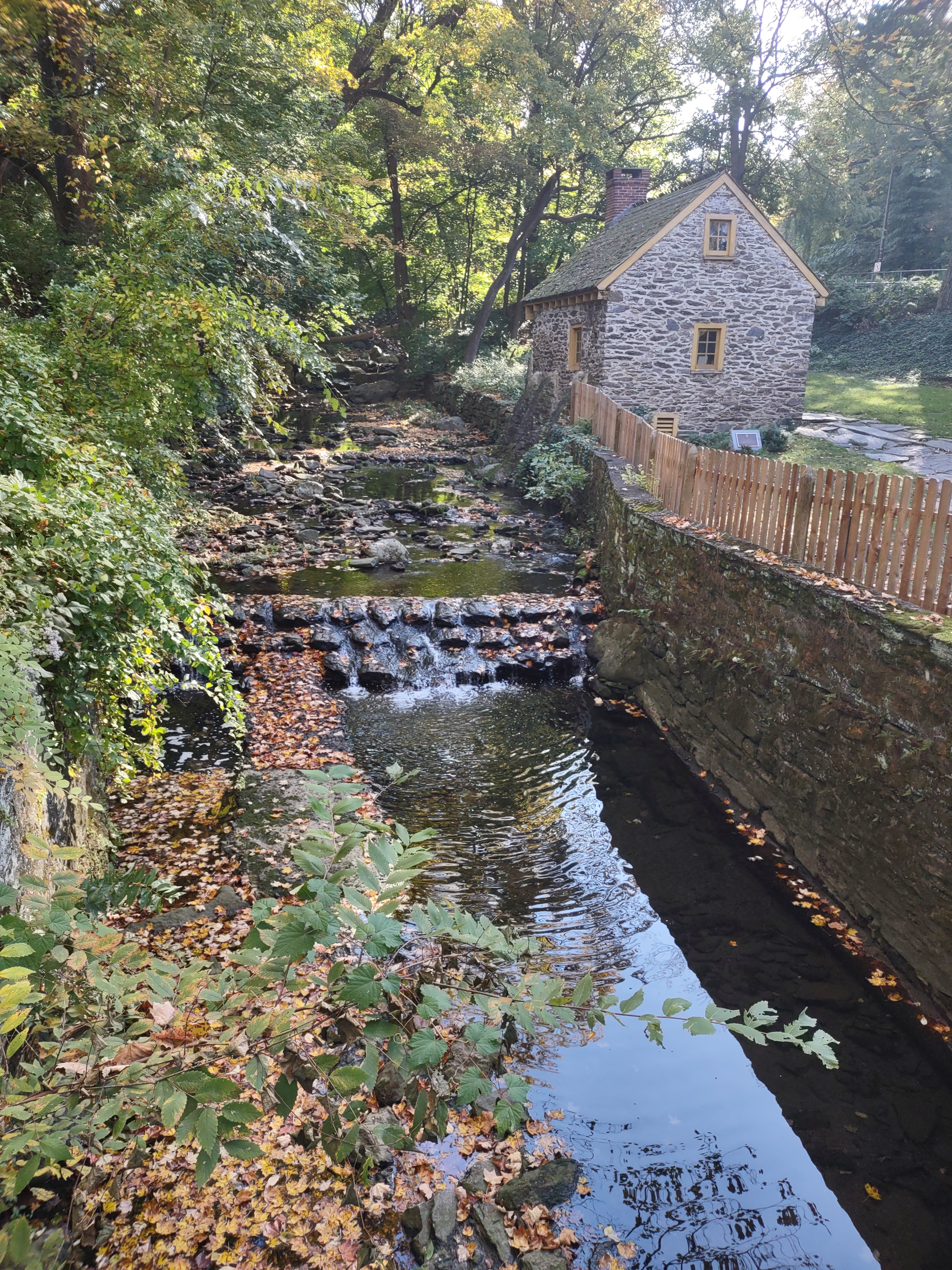

Paper Mill Run, also known as Monoshone Creek, is a small tributary of Wissahickon Creek that is located in Philadelphia, Pennsylvania, USA. Its watershed includes parts of the Mount Airy and Germantown neighborhoods of Philadelphia.

For most of its length, the present-day stream flows under Lincoln Drive. The stream first sees daylight near Johnson Street.

== History and geography ==
Monoshone is a word of obscure origin and unknown meaning. In present-day usage, the name Monoshone applies simultaneously to a creek, the watershed that drains into this creek, the valley that this creek has shaped, and some 100 acres of recreational parkland that surround it. The Monoshone lies completely within the City of Philadelphia and is part of a trout-stocked fishery.

William Rittenhouse, grandfather of the astronomer David Rittenhouse, built the first paper mill in America along Paper Mill Run in the late seventeenth century. This location was then known as Rittenhousetown. During the eighteenth century, the stream was dammed at several points to power more mills.

== Environmental issues ==
In recent years, the creek has been polluted from an unknown source that may have to do with a sewer line routed next to the buried stream along Lincoln Drive. A controversial wetlands restoration project in Saylor's Grove was built in 2006, in part an attempt to reduce the pollution of the stream by providing a natural buffer for some of the water flowing into it.

== See also ==
- List of rivers of Pennsylvania
