= Blue Ball Inn =

Pub in Cambridgeshire, England

Coordinates: 52°10′59.75″N 0°5′38.66″E

The Blue Ball Inn is a pub in Grantchester, Cambridgeshire, England.

It was rebuilt in 1893, and the layout is intact. It is on the Regional Inventory of Historic Pub Interiors for East Anglia.
