= Ann Sophia Towne Darrah =

American painter

- Born: 1819; Philadelphia, Pennsylvania
- Died: 1881 (aged 61–62)
- Known for: Painting
- Movement: White Mountain art

Ann Sophia Towne Darrah (1819–1881) was an American painter who often depicted the White Mountains of New Hampshire.

== Biography ==
Darrah was born in 1819 in Philadelphia. She was a student of Paul Weber.

Her work was included in the 1858 New Bedford Art Exhibition organized by the landscape painter Albert Bierstadt. From 1855 to 1864 Darrah exhibited in group exhibitions at the Boston Athenæum. From 1856 to 1867 she also exhibited at the Pennsylvania Academy of the Fine Arts.

Darrah died in 1881.

== Legacy ==
In 1882 the Museum of Fine Arts, Boston, held a memorial exhibition of her work.

Darrah's work was included as part of a historical retrospective on American art in the Palace of Fine Arts at the 1893 World's Columbian Exposition in Chicago.

== Gallery ==
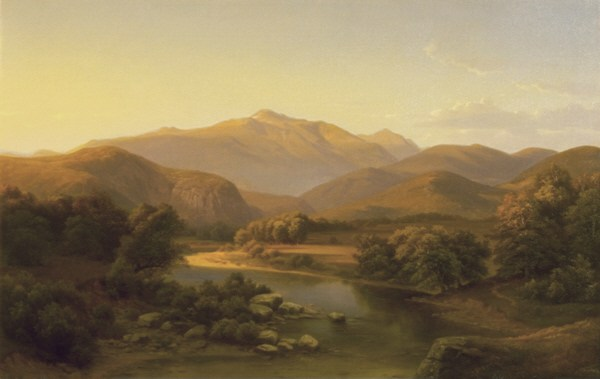
Mount Washington from Saco River, 1857

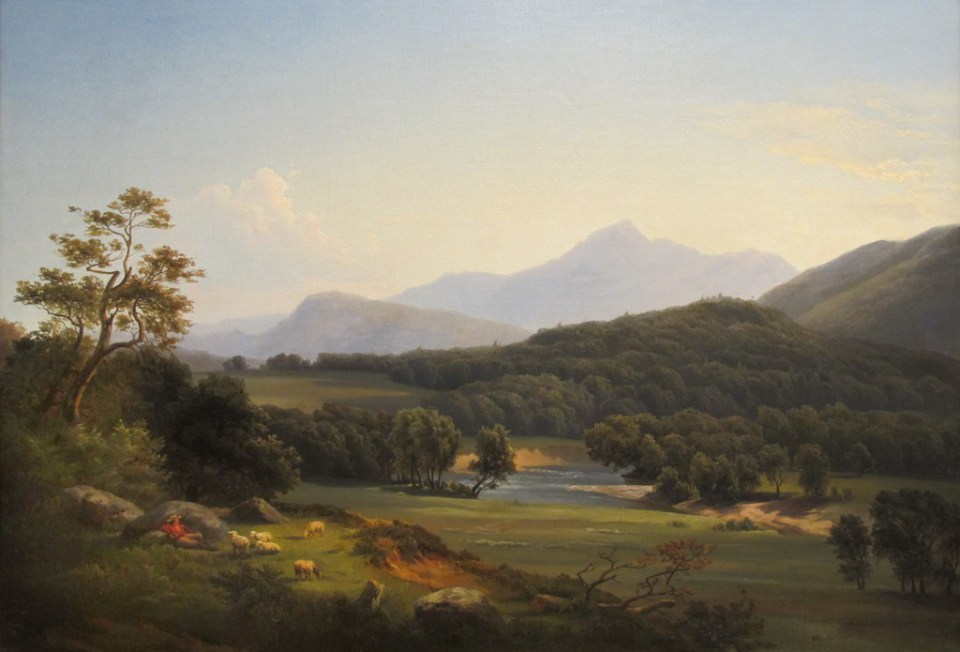
Mount Chocorua and Saco River from North Conway, 1856
