= Blue Hills, Kansas City =

Neighborhood of Kansas City, Missouri, U.S.

Blue Hills is a neighborhood in Southeast Kansas City, Missouri bounded North by Swope Parkway, South by 63rd Street, East by Prospect Ave, and West by The Paseo. The ZIP code for this neighborhood is 64110 and 64130.

== History ==
Blue Hills was a working class white neighborhood until the 1960s when blockbusting caused many Caucasians to leave the neighborhood. Around the 1970s, the neighborhood was majority African American. The public schools that serve Blue Hills are Troost Elementary School, J. J. Pershing Elementary, Frances Willard Elementary, Southeast and Paseo High Schools.

=== The 1900s ===
Most of the homes in Blue Hills were built in the 1910s and 1920s. From its early years until the 1960s nearly all of the residents of Blue Hills were white and most were working class, making it a working white neighborhood In the early 1960s, the racial composition of the neighborhood changed due to blockbusting, and in the 1970s more than 95% of Blue Hills residents were African-American.

=== The 2000s ===
During the 2008 financial crisis, Blue Hills was one of many American neighborhoods that suffered greatly from the housing crisis. Houses were boarded up, and African-Americans moved out. In 2021, it has mostly recovered, albeit with a few boarded houses left, due to young people moving in and fixing the old, boarded homes.
