= Bell Hill, Washington =

- Census-designated place
- Location of Bell Hill, Washington
- Coordinates: 48°03′18″N 123°05′13″W
- Country: United States
- State: Washington
- County: Clallam

Area
  - Total: 2.65 sq mi (6.86 km^{2})
  - Land: 2.65 sq mi (6.86 km^{2})
  - Water: 0 sq mi (0.0 km^{2})
- Elevation: 1,014 ft (309 m)

Population (2020)
  - Total: 875
  - Density: 330/sq mi (128/km^{2})
- Time zone: UTC-8 (Pacific (PST))
  - Summer (DST): UTC-7 (PDT)
- ZIP Code: 98382
- Area code(s): 360, 564
- FIPS code: 53-05245
- GNIS feature ID: 2407826

Bell Hill is an unincorporated community and census-designated place (CDP) in Clallam County, Washington, United States. The population was 875 at the 2020 census, up from 837 at the 2010 census. It is Located just south of the city of Sequim. Bell Hill gets somewhat more precipitation than Sequim, but is drier than most western Washington areas.

== Geography ==
Bell Hill is located in eastern Clallam County and is bordered to the north by the city of Sequim. The community is named for the hill that it sits on, which rises to an elevation of over 1,000 feet (300 m) above sea level, or more than 800 feet (240 m) above the center of Sequim. Bell Hill actually has two peaks, or hillocks. The Eastern hillock is approximately 950 feet (290 m) above sea level. The Western hillock is relatively exposed, while the eastern hillock is forested with Douglas fir and Pacific madrone (madrone).

According to the United States Census Bureau, the Bell Hill CDP has a total area of 2.7 square miles (6.9 km^{2}), all land.

== Demographics ==
Historical population
| Census | Pop. | Note | %± |
|---|---|---|---|
| 2000 | 731 | | — |
| 2010 | 837 | | 14.5% |
| 2020 | 875 | | 4.5% |
U.S. Decennial Census; 1990 2000 2010

Ben Hill first appeared as a census designated place in the 2000 U.S. census.

=== Racial and ethnic composition ===
Bell Hill CDP, Washington – Racial and ethnic composition Note: the US Census treats Hispanic/Latino as an ethnic category. This table excludes Latinos from the racial categories and assigns them to a separate category. Hispanics/Latinos may be of any race.
| Race / Ethnicity (NH = Non-Hispanic) | Pop 2000 | Pop 2010 | Pop 2020 | % 2000 | % 2010 | % 2020 |
|---|---|---|---|---|---|---|
| White alone (NH) | 690 | 780 | 751 | 94.39% | 93.19% | 85.83% |
| Black or African American alone (NH) | 0 | 0 | 3 | 0.00% | 0.00% | 0.34% |
| Native American or Alaska Native alone (NH) | 11 | 7 | 10 | 1.50% | 0.84% | 1.14% |
| Asian alone (NH) | 8 | 16 | 21 | 1.09% | 1.91% | 2.40% |
| Native Hawaiian or Pacific Islander alone (NH) | 2 | 2 | 1 | 0.27% | 0.24% | 0.11% |
| Other race alone (NH) | 0 | 2 | 5 | 0.00% | 0.24% | 0.57% |
| Mixed race or Multiracial (NH) | 13 | 7 | 55 | 1.78% | 0.84% | 6.29% |
| Hispanic or Latino (any race) | 7 | 23 | 29 | 0.96% | 2.75% | 3.31% |
| Total | 731 | 837 | 875 | 100.00% | 100.00% | 100.00% |

=== 2000 census ===
As of the census of 2000, there were 731 people, 325 households, and 259 families residing in the CDP. The population density was 262.4 people per square mile (101.2/km^{2}). There were 347 housing units at an average density of 124.6/sq mi (48.0/km^{2}). The racial makeup of the CDP was 95.21% White, 1.50% Native American, 1.09% Asian, 0.27% Pacific Islander, 0.14% from other races, and 1.78% from two or more races. Hispanic or Latino of any race were 0.96% of the population.

There were 325 households, out of which 17.2% had children under the age of 18 living with them, 73.8% were married couples living together, 3.7% had a female householder with no husband present, and 20.3% were non-families. 16.6% of all households were made up of individuals, and 7.4% had someone living alone who was 65 years of age or older. The average household size was 2.25 and the average family size was 2.46.

In the CDP, the age distribution of the population shows 13.8% under the age of 18, 3.1% from 18 to 24, 13.8% from 25 to 44, 36.3% from 45 to 64, and 33.0% who were 65 years of age or older. The median age was 57 years. For every 100 females, there were 94.4 males. For every 100 females aged 18 and over, there were 94.4 males.

The median income for a household in the CDP was $66,442, and the median income for a family was $85,595. Males had a median income of $42,083 versus $25,250 for females. The per capita income for the CDP was $35,568. About 5.3% of families and 8.5% of the population were below the poverty line, including 13.4% of those under age 18 and 6.8% of those age 65 or over.
