= Cerro Azul =

Cerro Azul ("blue hill" in Spanish and Portuguese) may mean any of several different places:

- Cerro Azul, Veracruz, in Mexico
- Cerro Azul, Panama
- Cerro Azul, Peru
- Cerro Azul, Paraná, Brazil
- Cerro Azul, Misiones, Argentina
- Cerro Azul (Ecuador volcano), a volcano in the Galapagos
- Cerro Azul (Chile volcano), a volcano in Chile, a.k.a. Quizapu
