= Historic RittenhouseTown =

- U.S. National Register of Historic Places
- U.S. National Historic Landmark District
- Philadelphia Register of Historic Places
- Pennsylvania state historical marker
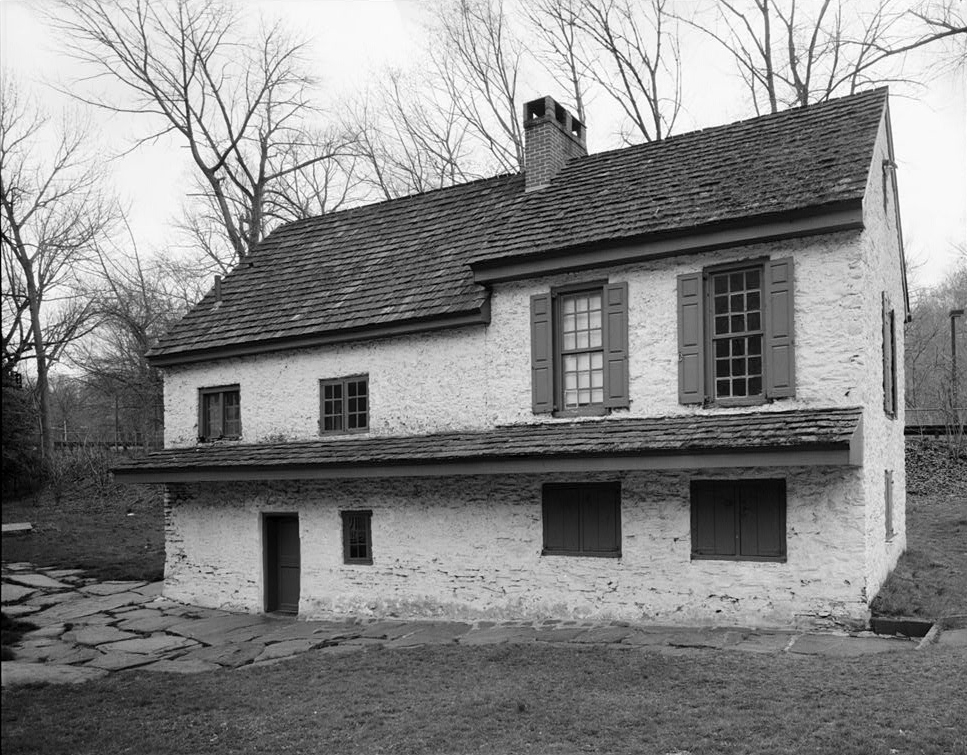
- Rittenhouse homestead

- Location within Pennsylvania
- Location: 206–210 Lincoln Drive, Philadelphia, Pennsylvania
- Coordinates: 40.02860°N 75.19112°W
- Area: 84 acres (34 ha)
- Built: 1690–1732
- Architectural style: Georgian, Federal
- NRHP reference No.: 92001878

Significant dates
- Added to NRHP: April 27, 1992
- Designated NHLD: April 27, 1992
- Designated PHMC: April 8, 1991

Historic RittenhouseTown, sometimes referred to as Rittenhouse Historic District, encompasses the remains of an early industrial community which was the site of the first paper mill in British North America. The mill was built in 1690 by William Rittenhouse and his son Nicholas on the north bank of Paper Mill Run (Monoshone Creek) near (and now within) Philadelphia, Pennsylvania. The district, off Lincoln Drive near Wissahickon Avenue in Fairmount Park, includes six of up to forty-five original buildings. RittenhouseTown was listed on the National Register of Historic Places and was designated a National Historic Landmark District on April 27, 1992.

== History ==
Flax was woven into linen in nearby Germantown. When the linen fabrics wore out, the rags were brought to Rittenhouse Town to be made into paper. Paper produced at the Rittenhouse mill was sold to printers in Germantown, Philadelphia, and New York City. The Rittenhouse paper mill operated until about the 1850s, when the family had been leasing it out to other types of manufacturing.

Between the years 1890 and 1917, the site was acquired through donations and purchases by the City of Philadelphia's Fairmount Park Commission. The nonprofit organization Historic RittenhouseTown, Inc. was founded in 1984 to preserve, restore, and historically interpret RittenhouseTown. The organization maintains offices within RittenhouseTown and offers historic tours, paper making workshops and special events.

== Description ==
RittenhouseTown includes six historic buildings maintained by Historic RittenhouseTown: Abraham Rittenhouse Home (c. 1720); Rittenhouse Homestead (1707); Rittenhouse Bake House (c. 1730); Enoch Rittenhouse Home (1845); Jacob Rittenhouse Home (1810); and another unnamed 18th century Rittenhouse Home. The Rittenhouse Bake House is used for cooking demonstrations. A 20th century barn originally built for the Fairmount Park Commission is now used for paper-making workshops and demonstrations.

Most of RittenhouseTown's buildings are built of stone and finished in stucco, and generally exhibit colonial building methods. They are all that are left of a much larger industrial complex and worker village, of which more than thirty-five buildings have been demolished. The area also includes archaeological industrial remains of some of the mill buildings.

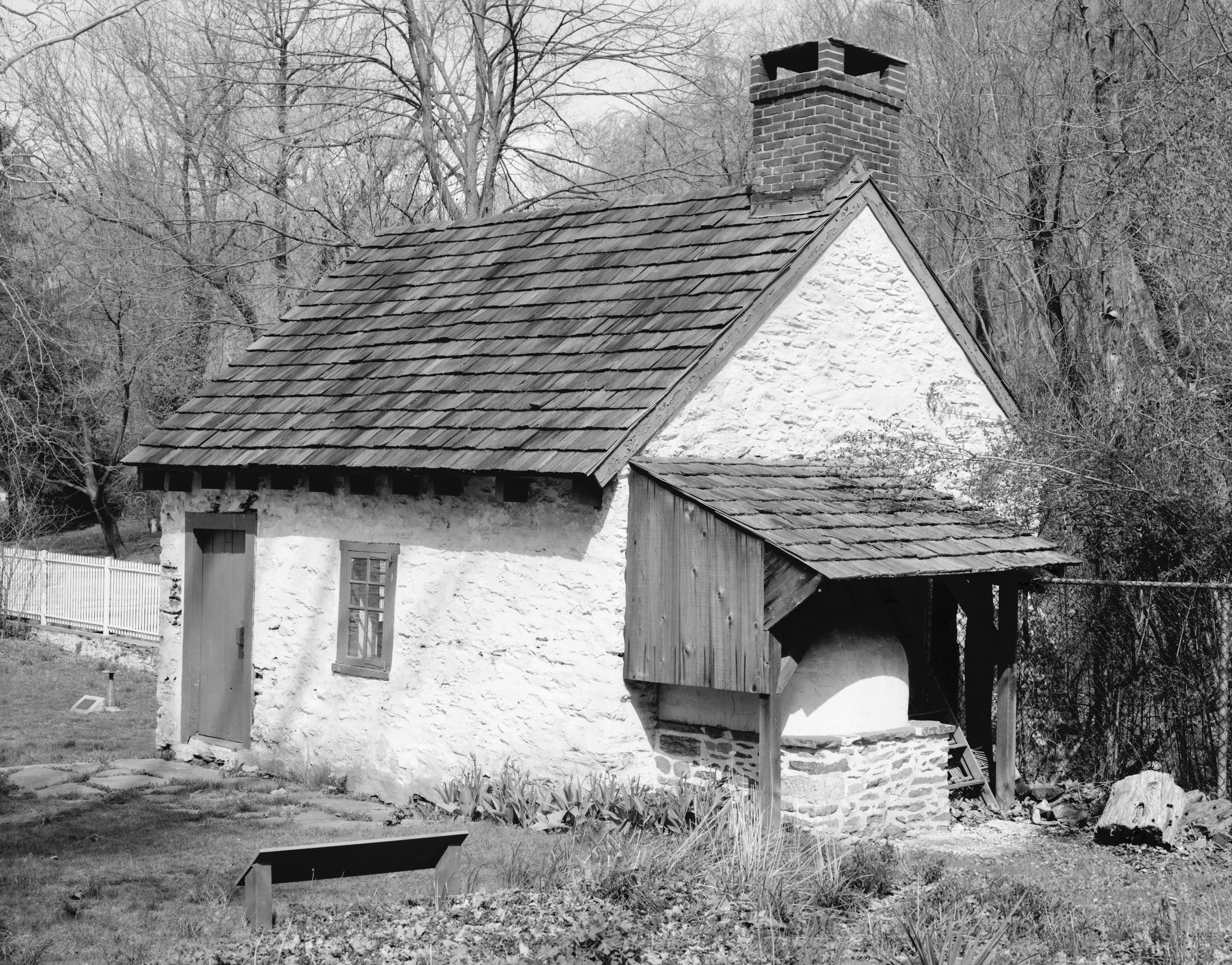
Outbuilding, 207A Lincoln Drive, Fairmount Park

== See also ==
- Awbury Historic District
- Chestnut Hill Historic District
- Colonial Germantown Historic District
- Tulpehocken Station Historic District
- List of National Historic Landmarks in Philadelphia
- National Register of Historic Places listings in Northwest Philadelphia
