= Wissahickon Valley Park =

Park in Philadelphia

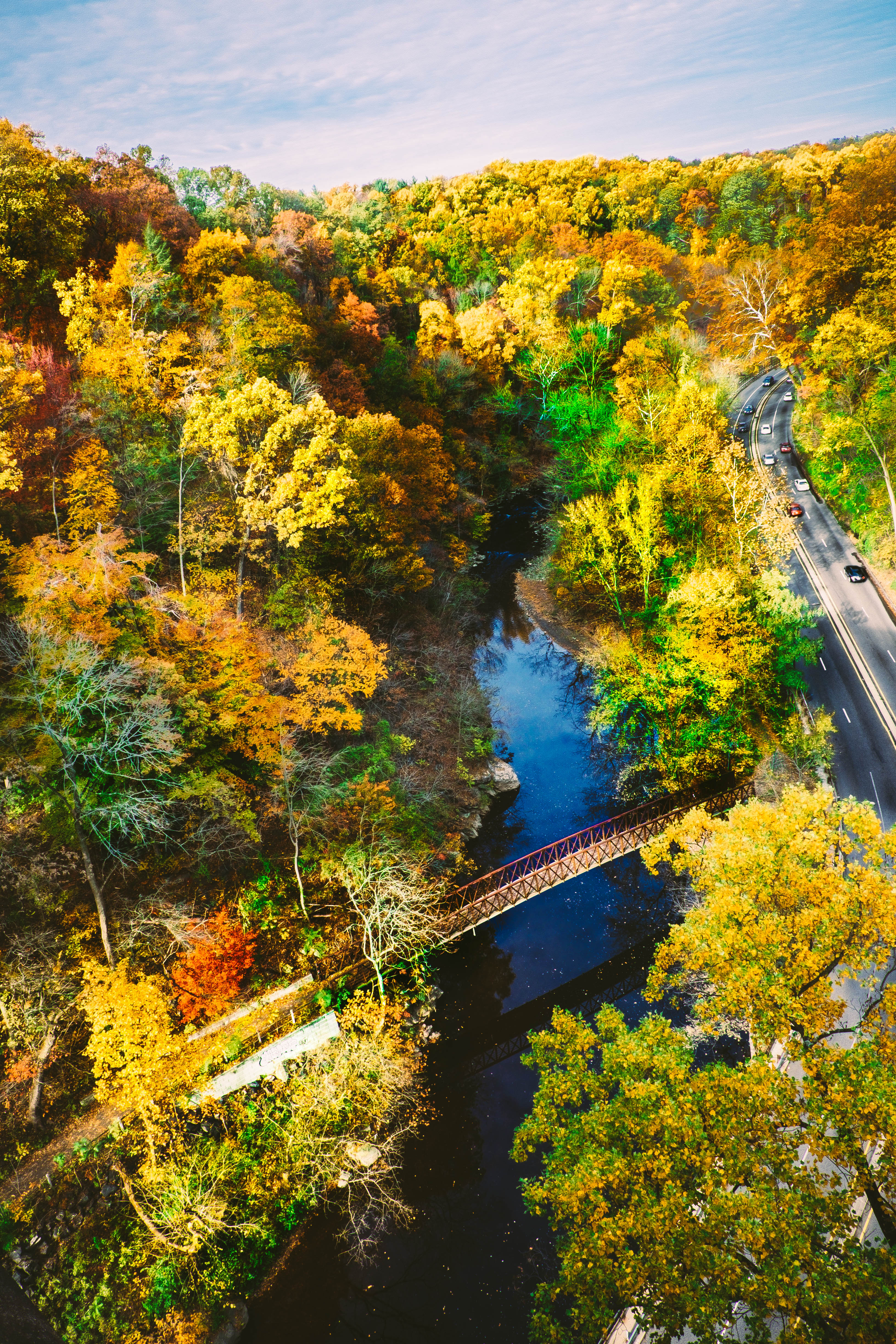
- View from the Wissahickon Memorial Bridge of the lower Wissahickon Creek and Lincoln Drive

- Location within Philadelphia Location within Pennsylvania
- Location: Pennsylvania, United States
- Nearest city: Philadelphia
- Coordinates: 40.050°N 75.215°W
- Area: 2,042 acres (8.26 km^{2})
- Established: 2010; 16 years ago
- Governing body: Philadelphia Parks & Recreation

U.S. National Natural Landmark
- Designated: 1964

Wissahickon Valley Park is a large urban park that is located in Northwest Philadelphia, Pennsylvania, United States. It protects 2,042 acres (8.26 km^{2}) of woodland surrounding the Wissahickon Creek between the Montgomery County border and the Schuylkill River. For several miles, the creek winds through a dramatic wooded gorge known as the Wissahickon Valley, a National Natural Landmark.

Forbidden Drive runs the length of the valley, a car-free gravel road popular for walking, running, cycling, and horseback riding. Side trails lead from Forbidden Drive up to rugged bridle paths suitable for hiking and trail riding. The park contains about 50 miles (80 km) of trails in total.

The area was considered part of Fairmount Park from 1867 until the merger of the Fairmount Park Commission and the Department of Recreation in 2010. Today, Wissahickon Valley Park is a unit of Philadelphia Parks & Recreation and remains the second-largest park in Philadelphia after Fairmount.

== History ==
While logging and industrialization occurred in some parts of the valley in the late 18th and early 19th century, the gorge itself was known for its natural environment, inspiring religious mystics like Johannes Kelpius, writers like Edgar Allan Poe, John Greenleaf Whittier, George Lippard, and William Cobbett; and artists like Thomas Moran, James Peale, William Trost Richards, and Currier and Ives.

In 1924, park users and neighbors formed the nonprofit Friends of the Wissahickon (FOW) to direct volunteer efforts supporting the city in its stewardship of the park.

In 1964, a 1,250-acre (5.1 km^{2}) area of the park known as the Wissahickon Valley was designated a National Natural Landmark.

== Forbidden Drive ==
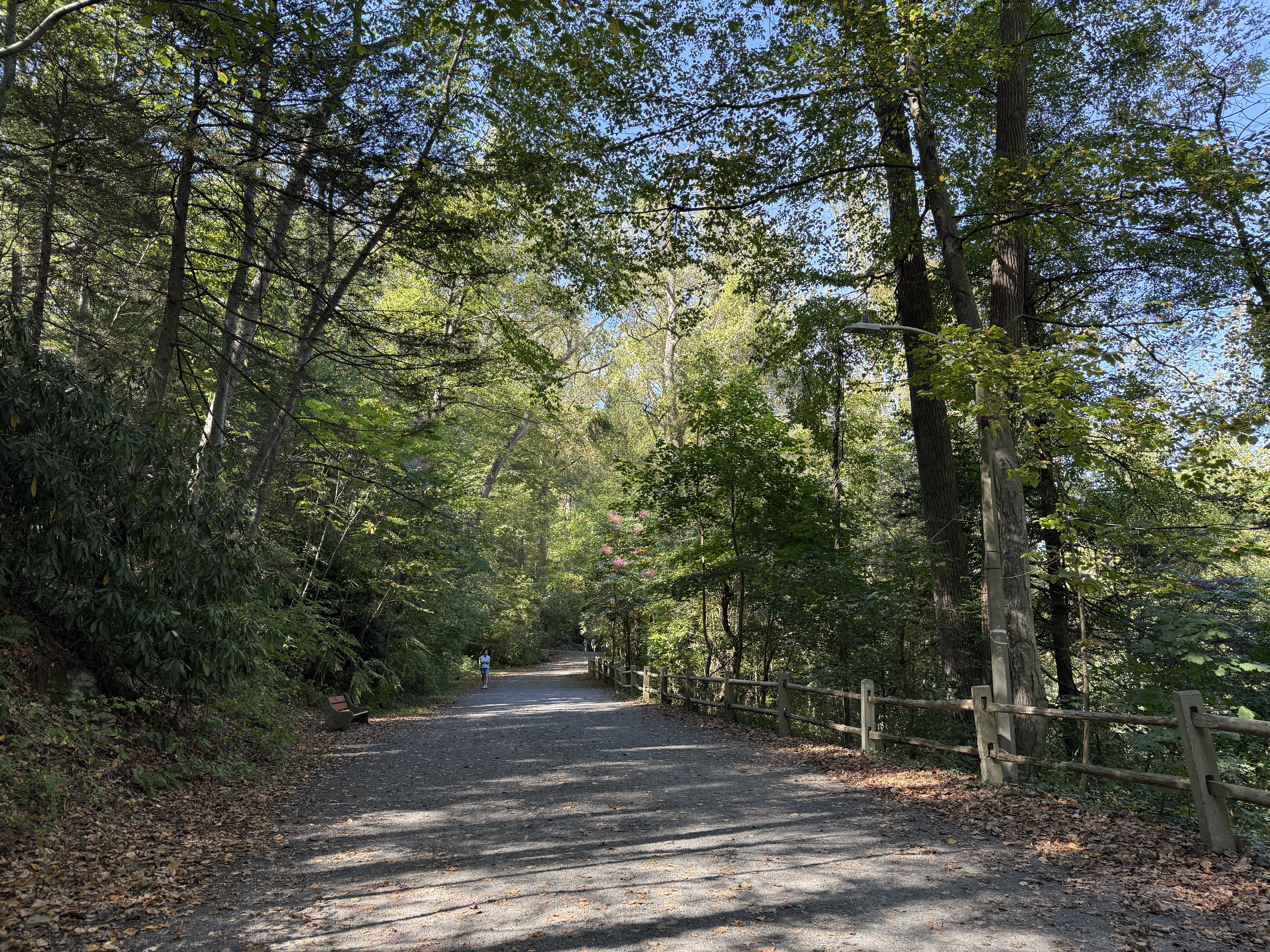
Forbidden Drive

Forbidden Drive, formerly known as the Wissahickon Turnpike, is a wide rocky trail running through the Wissahickon Valley from Ten Box to Cedars House at the upper end of the Park. It is called Forbidden Drive because of a successful protest against cars being allowed to drive in the park. In 1920, the Park Commission wanted to allow cars in the park, but 1,000 protesters on horseback and 12,000 spectators on foot fought against cars on the Wissahickon Turnpike. Every year, the Wissahickon Day Parade is held to celebrate the anniversary of this protest.

== Landmarks ==
- Valley Green Inn, a tavern built in 1850
- Wissahickon Hall, the first of numerous inns in the valley

=== Houses ===
- Cedars House
- Hermitage Mansion
- Livezey House, a colonial era mill (aka Glen Fern)
- Monastery House
- Philadelphia Canoe Club
- RittenhouseTown
- Thomas Mansion

=== Bridges ===
- Fingerspan Bridge
- Kitchen's Lane Bridge
- Thomas Mill Covered Bridge
- Walnut Lane Bridge
- Wissahickon Memorial Bridge (aka the Henry Avenue Bridge)

=== Other ===
- Cresheim Creek
- Devil's Pool
- Statue of Henry H. Houston, developer of Wissahickon
- The Native American Teedyuscung and Toleration statues
- Mom Rinker's Rock

== Gallery ==
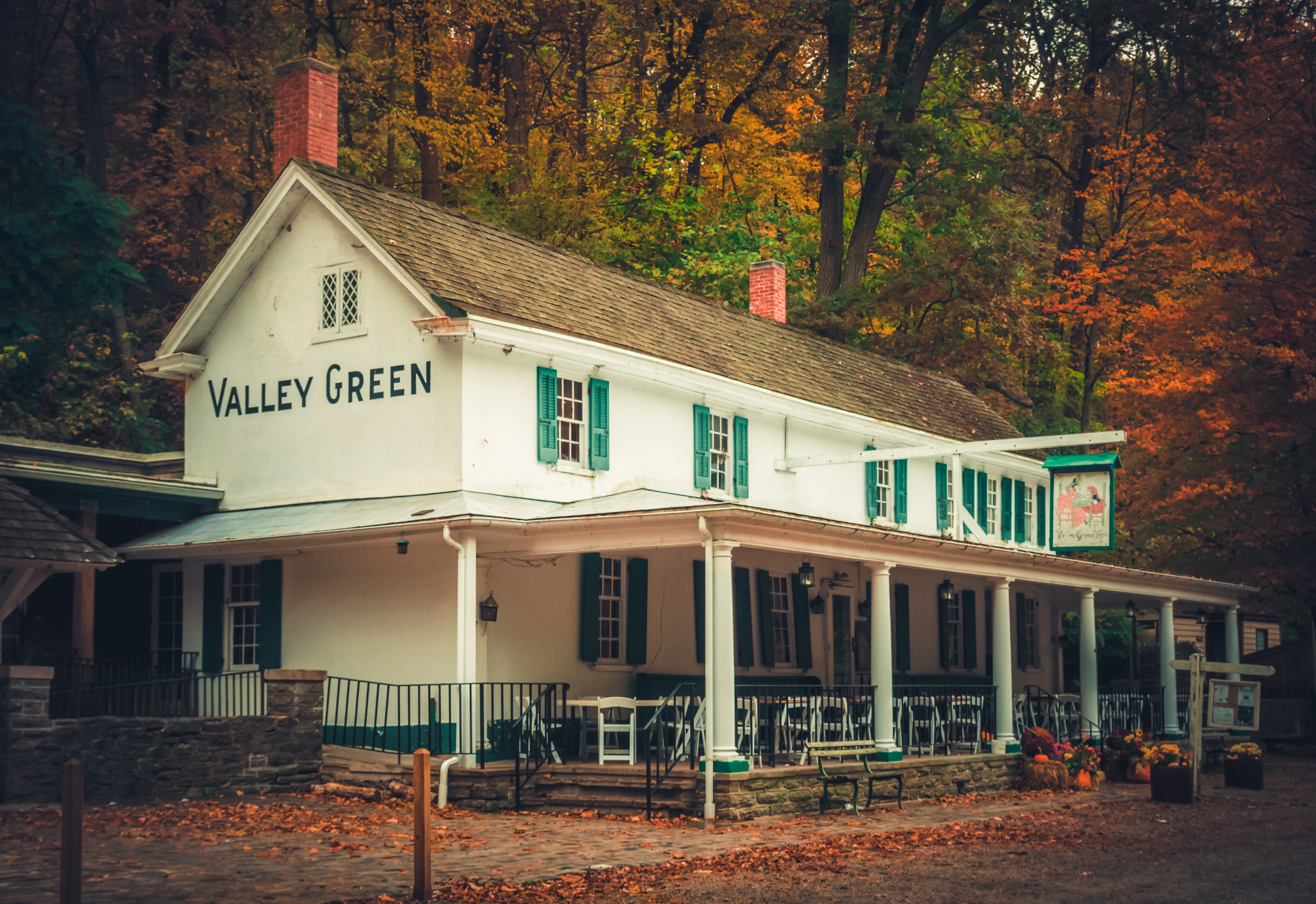
Valley Green Inn on Forbidden Drive

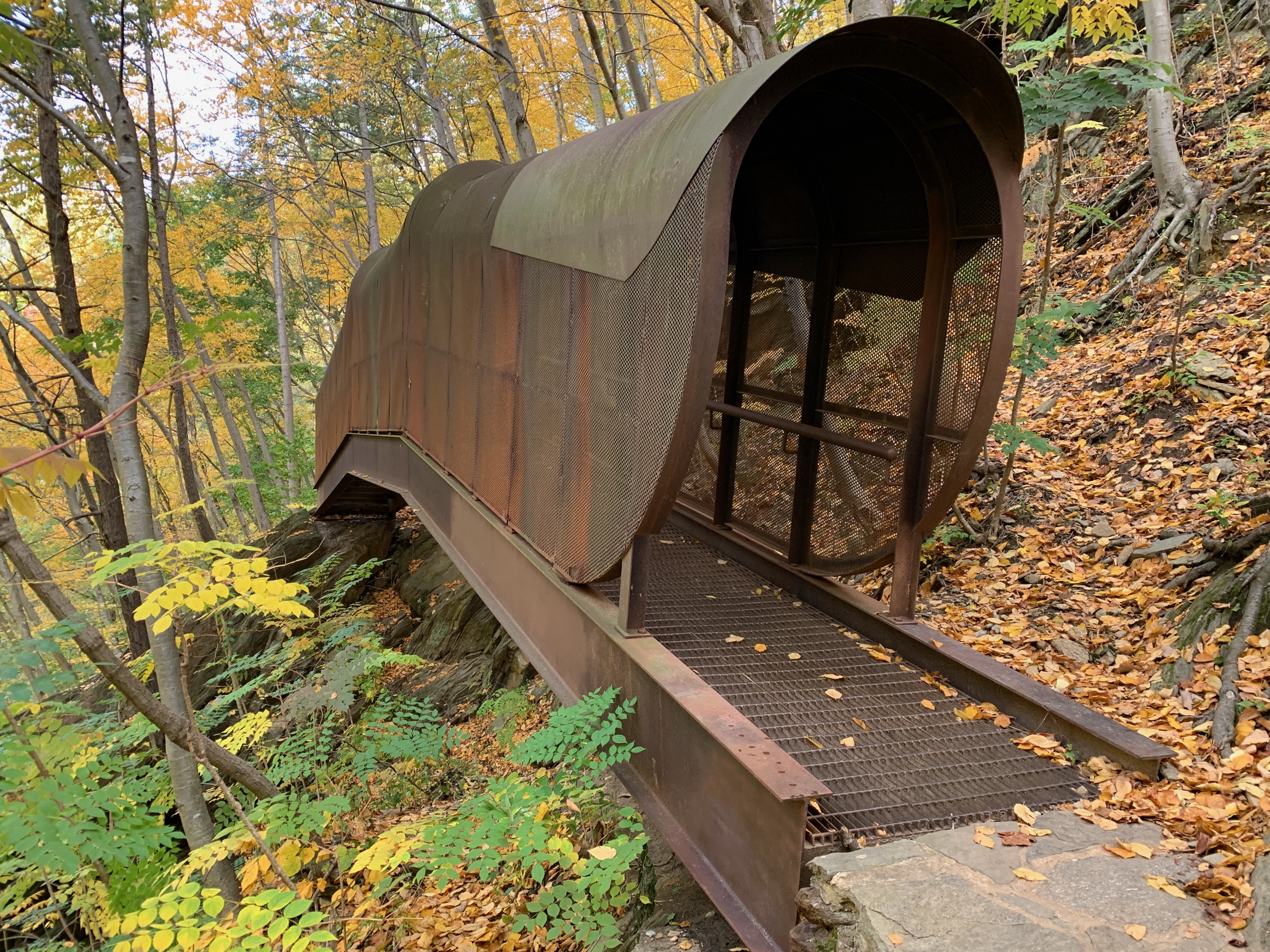
Fingerspan by Jody Pinto on the Orange Trail

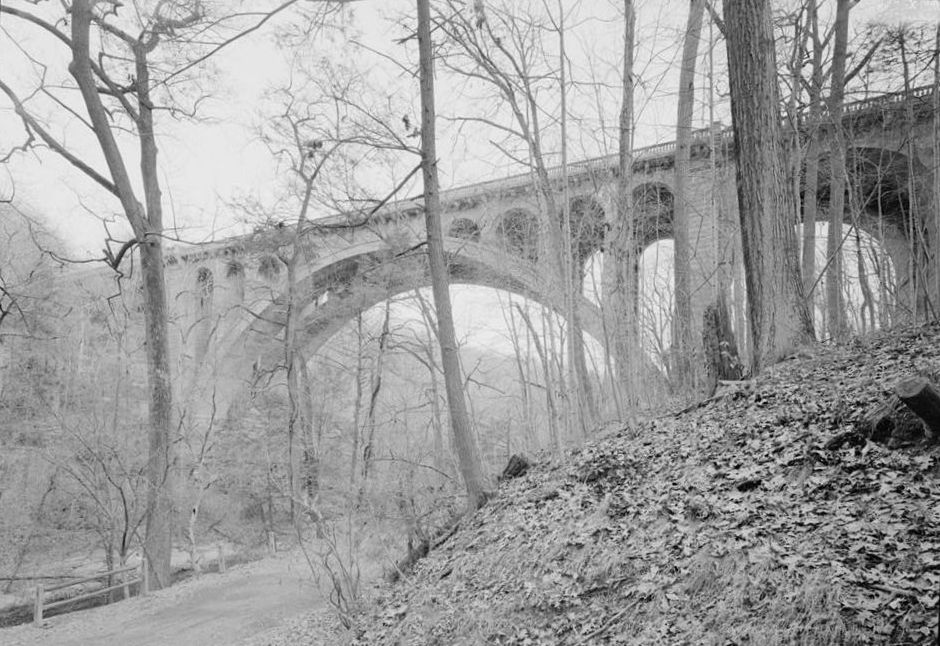
Walnut Lane Bridge

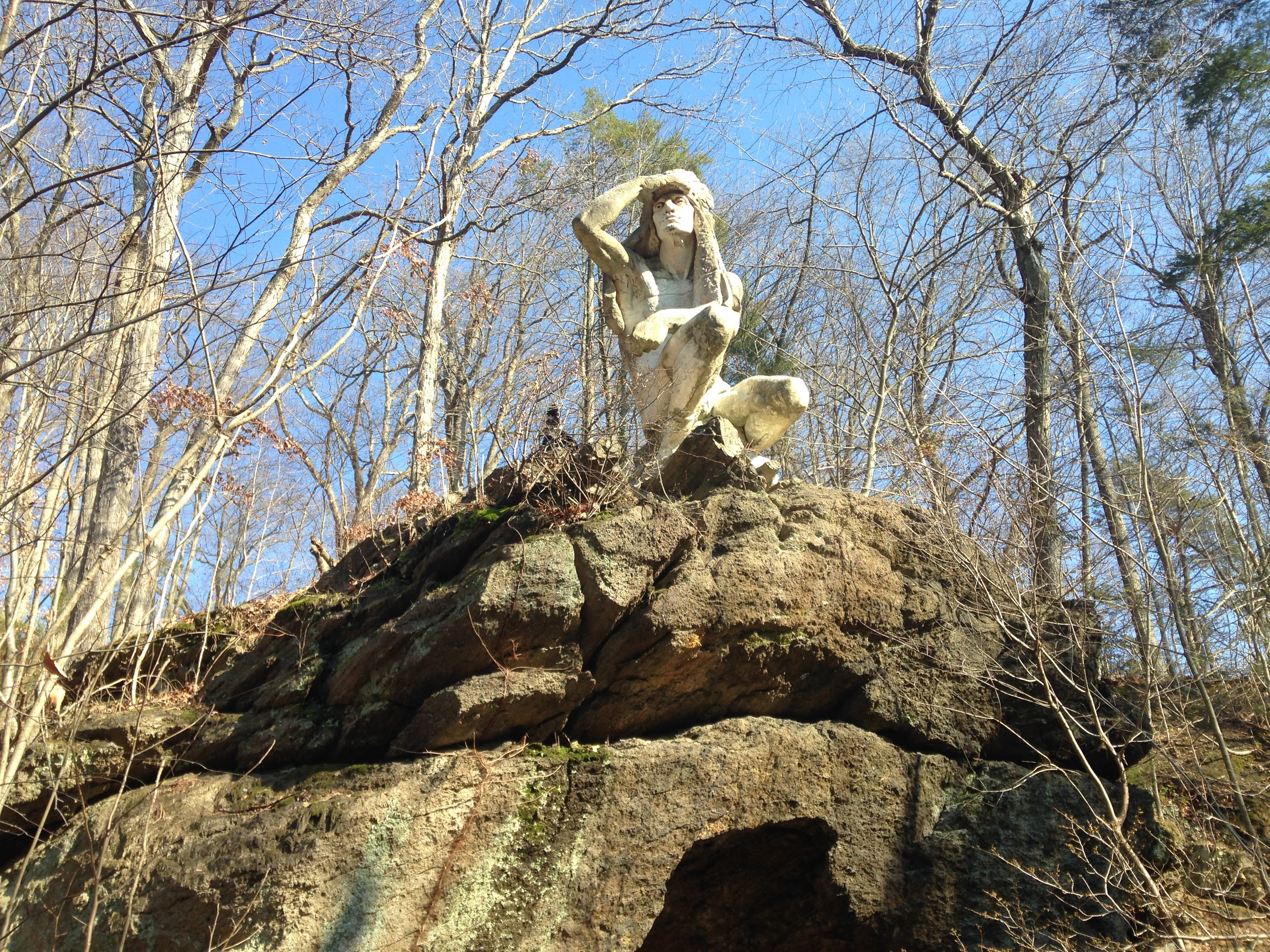
Statue of Teedyuscung by John Massey Rhind

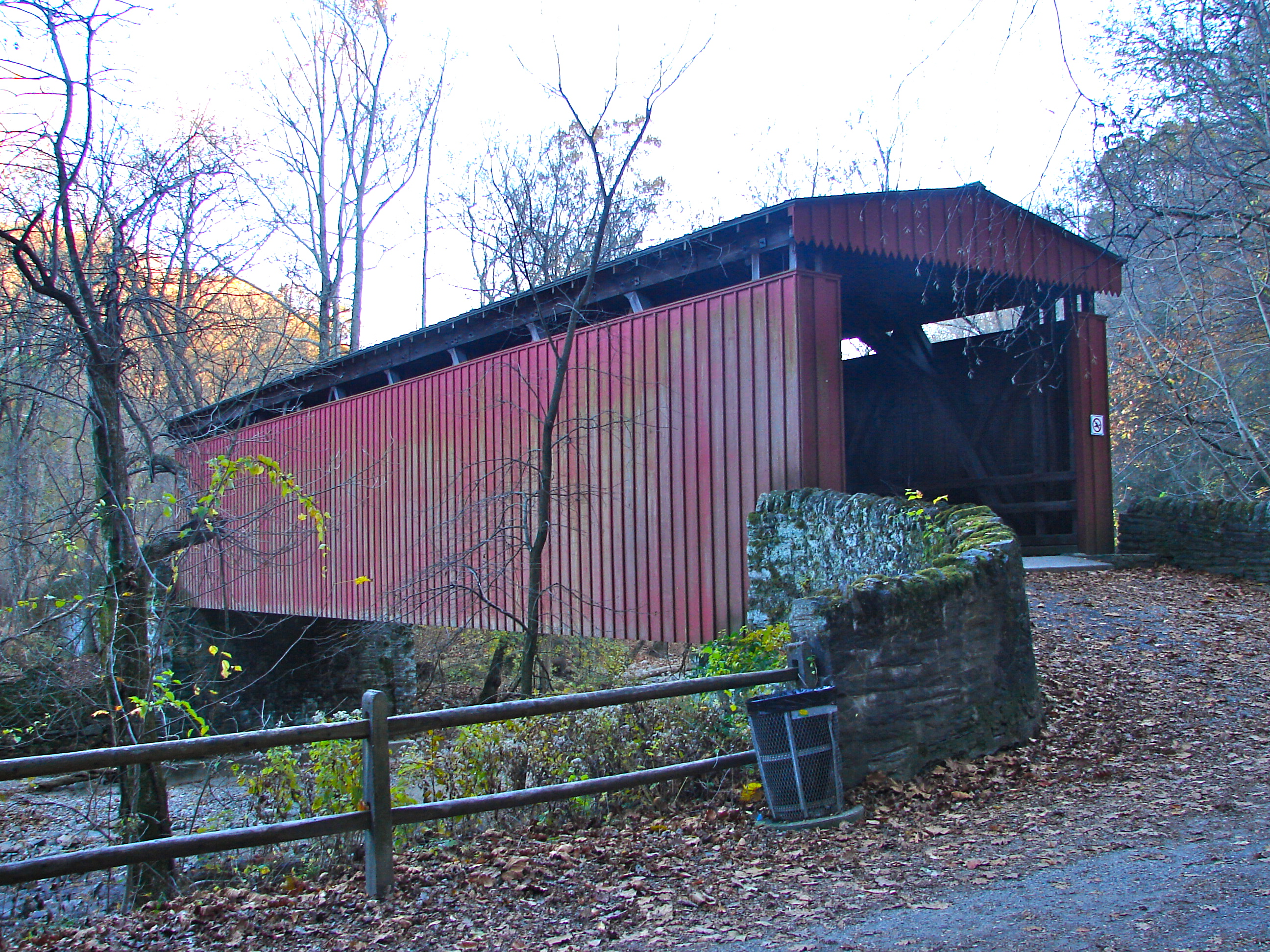
Thomas Mill Covered Bridge

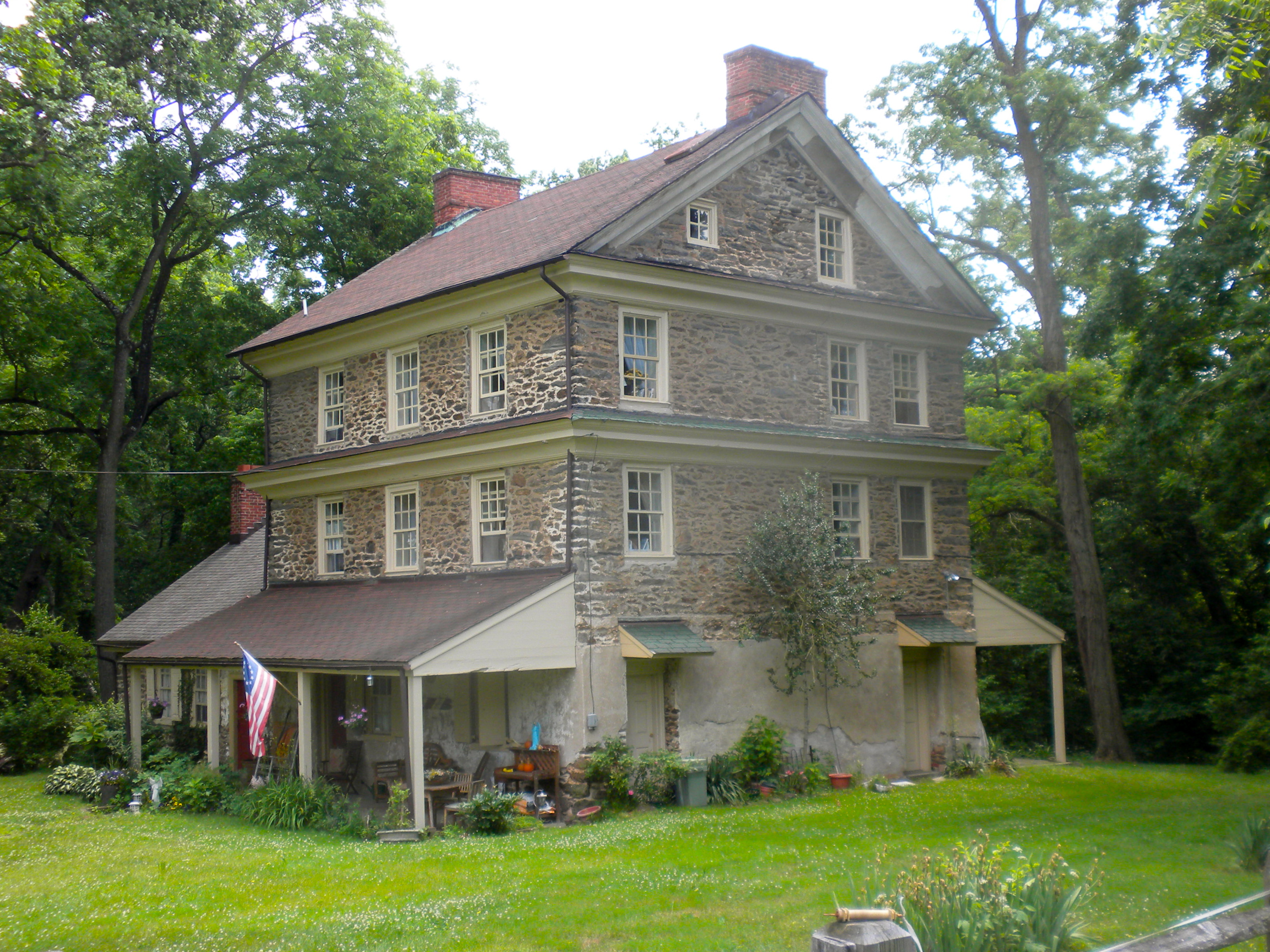
The Monastery

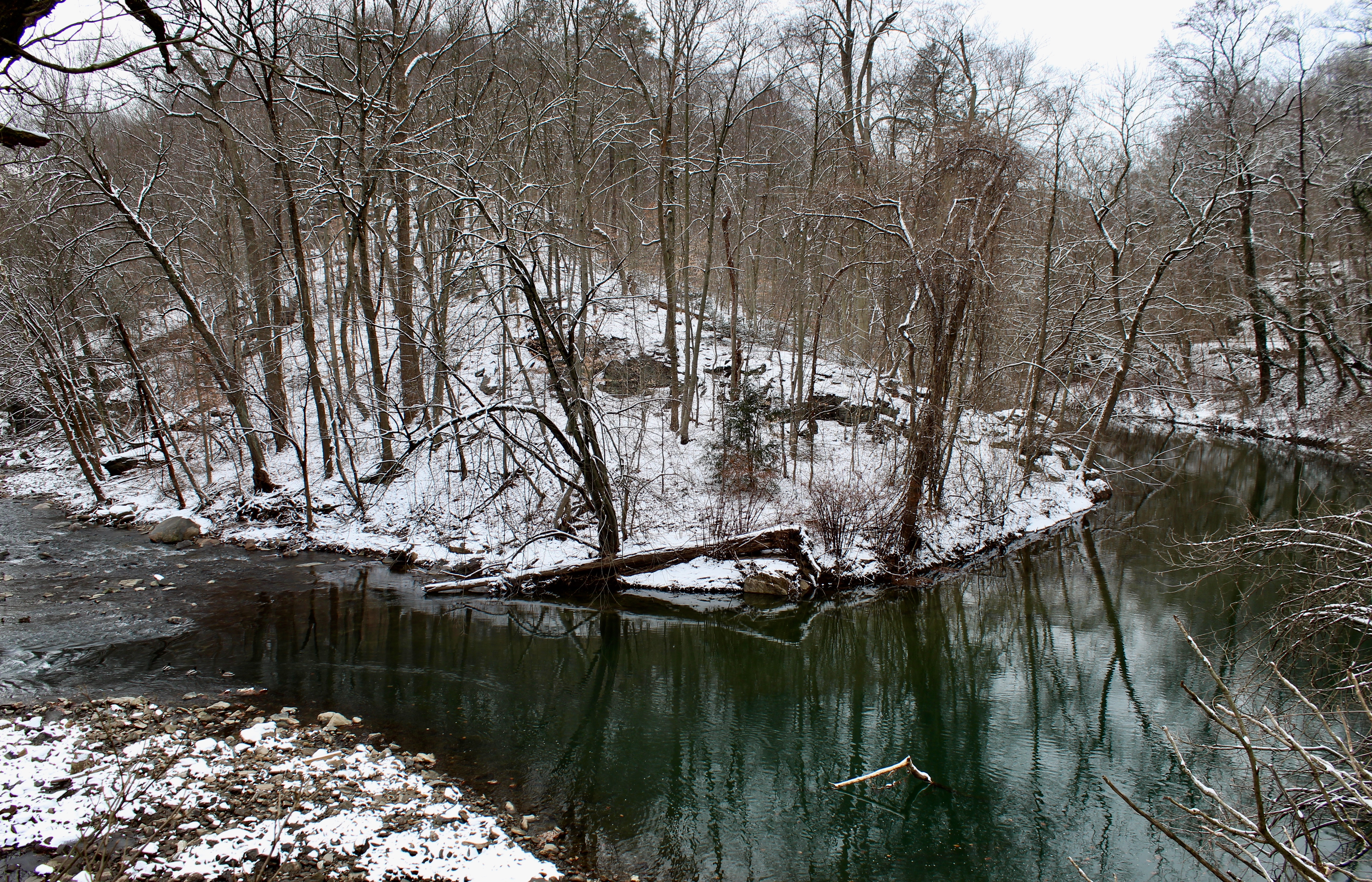
Bend in the Wissahickon Creek in winter

== See also ==
- Wissahickon Trail
- Fairmount Park
- List of parks in Philadelphia
