= Thomas Mill Covered Bridge =

- U.S. National Register of Historic Places
- U.S. Historic district – Contributing property
- Philadelphia Register of Historic Places
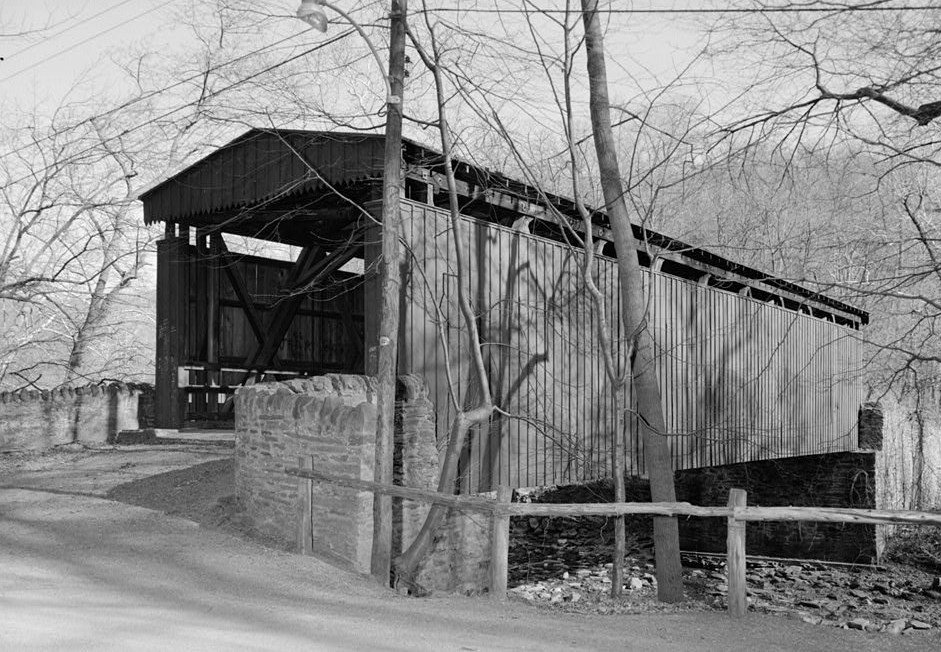
- Thomas Mill Covered Bridge in 1972

- Location within Philadelphia Location within Pennsylvania Location within the United States
- Location: Thomas Mill Rd., Wissahickon Valley Park, Philadelphia, Pennsylvania
- Coordinates: 40.07187°N 75.22559°W
- Built: 1855
- MPS: Covered Bridges of the Delaware River Watershed TR
- NRHP reference No.: 80003621
- Added to NRHP: December 1, 1980

The Thomas Mill Covered Bridge, aka the Thomas Mill Bridge or the Thomas Mill Road Covered Bridge, is a historic, single-span, wooden covered bridge across the Wissahickon Creek in Wissahickon Valley Park in Northwest Philadelphia, Pennsylvania.

It is the only remaining covered bridge in Philadelphia and is the only covered bridge in a major US city. It was listed on the National Register of Historic Places in 1980. It is a Contributing Property of the Chestnut Hill Historic District.

== History and architectural features ==
This 86.5-foot-long (26.4 m), 18.66-foot-wide (5.69 m), Howe truss bridge was built in 1855. It was renovated by the Works Progress Administration in 1939, and by the city of Philadelphia in 2000.

The bridge is open to pedestrian and bicycle traffic.

== Gallery ==
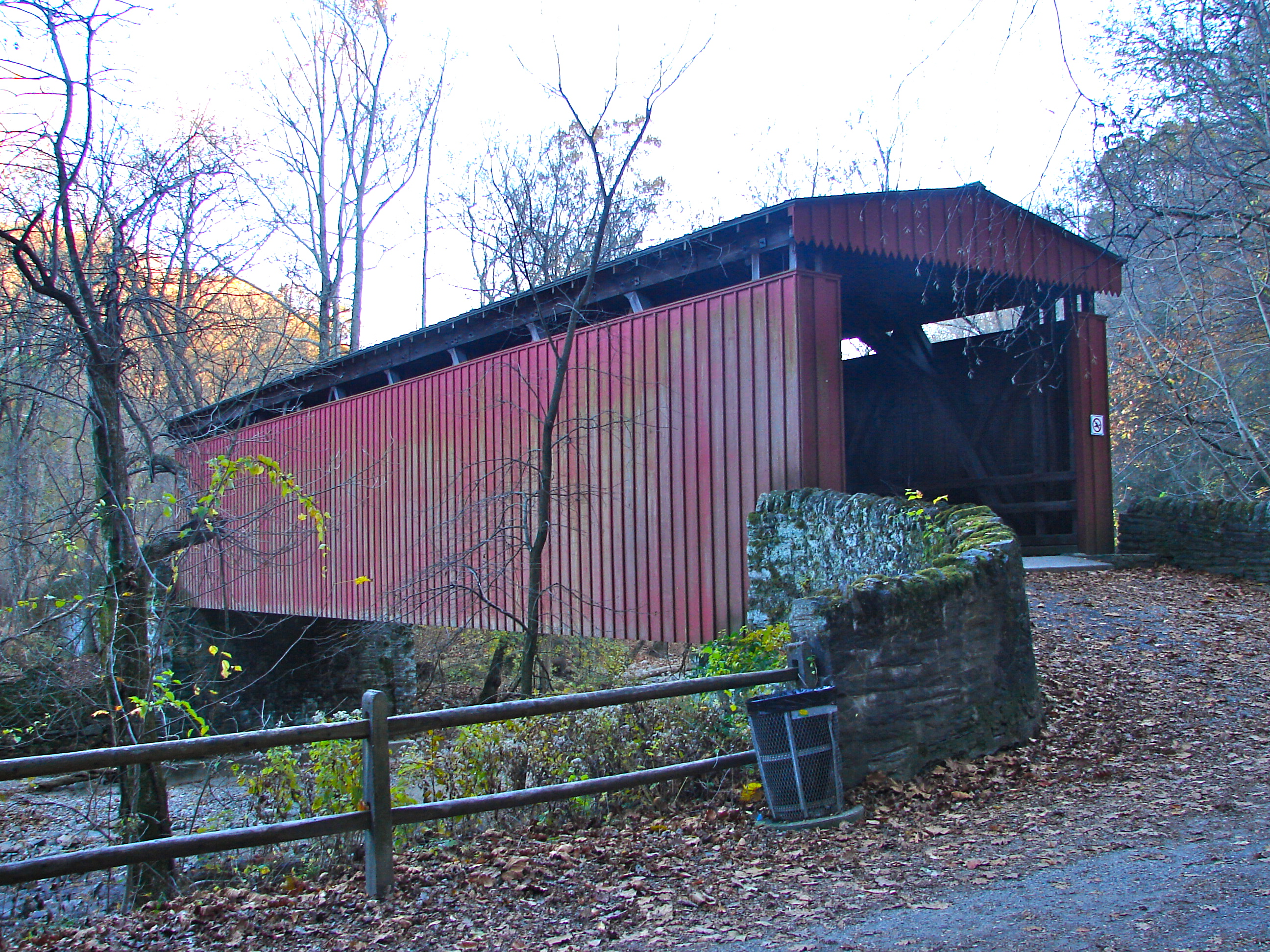
Bridge in 2010

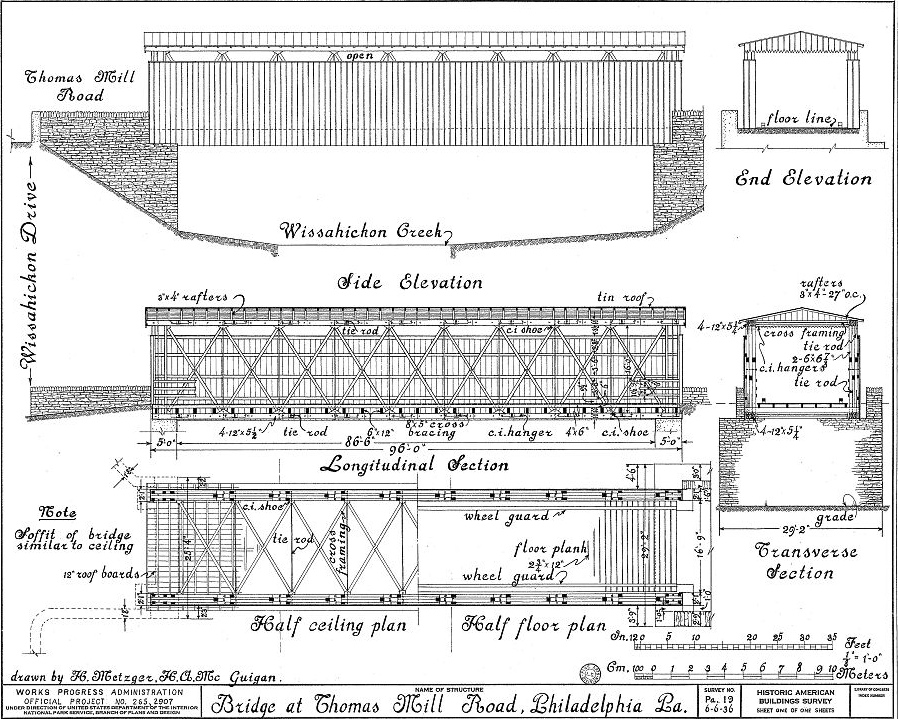
HABS drawing
