= Presque Isle State Park =

Pennsylvania state park on Lake Erie

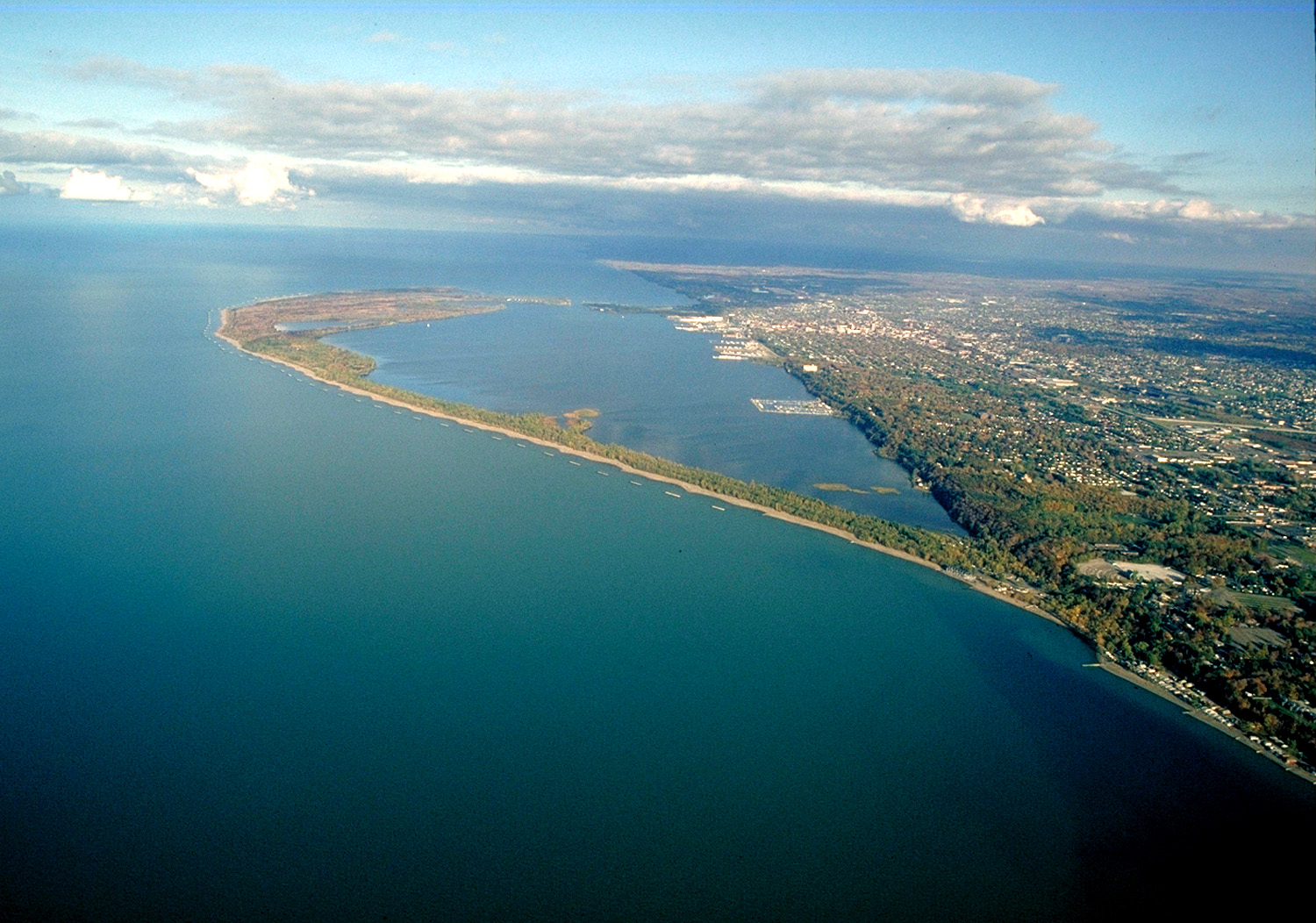
- Aerial view of Presque Isle toward the east-northeast

- Location within Pennsylvania Location within the United States
- Interactive map of Presque Isle State Park
- Location: Millcreek Township, Erie County, Pennsylvania, United States
- Coordinates: 42°06′35″N 80°09′14″W
- Area: 3,112.29 acres (1,259.50 ha)
- Elevation: 576 feet (176 m)
- Established: 1921
- Administrator: Pennsylvania Department of Conservation and Natural Resources
- Website: Official website
- Pennsylvania State Parks

U.S. National Natural Landmark
- Designated: 1967

Presque Isle State Park (/prɛsk/ PRESK) is a 3,112-acre (1,259 ha) Pennsylvania State Park on an arching, sandy peninsula jutting into Lake Erie, 4 miles (6 km) west of the city of Erie, in Millcreek Township, Erie County, Pennsylvania, United States. The peninsula sweeps northeastward, surrounding Presque Isle Bay along the park's southern coast. It has 13 miles (21 km) of roads, 21 miles (34 km) of recreational trails, 13 beaches for swimming, and a marina. Popular activities at the park include swimming, boating, hiking, biking, and birdwatching.

The recorded history of Presque Isle begins with the Erielhonan, a Native American tribe who gave their name to Lake Erie, and includes French, British, and American forts, as well as serving as a base for Commodore Oliver Hazard Perry's fleet in the War of 1812. With the growing importance of shipping on Lake Erie in the 19th century, Presque Isle became home to several lighthouses and what later became a United States Coast Guard station. In 1921, it became a state park, and as of 2007, it hosts over 4 million visitors per year, the most of any Pennsylvania state park.

The Presque Isle peninsula formed on a moraine from the end of the Wisconsin glaciation and is constantly being reshaped by waves and wind. This pattern leads to seven ecological zones within the park, which provides a classic example of ecological succession. A National Natural Landmark since 1967, the park has been named one of the best places in the United States for watching birds, particularly in the Gull Point Natural Area. The Tom Ridge Environmental Center at the entrance to the park allows visitors to learn more about the park and its ecology. The Pennsylvania Bureau of Parks has chosen Presque Isle State Park for its list of "25 Must-See Pennsylvania State Parks".

The park was one of five Pennsylvania State Parks in the path of totality for the 2024 solar eclipse, with 3 minutes and 45 seconds of totality.

== History ==
=== Early inhabitants ===
Presque Isle was formed at the end of the Wisconsin glaciation about 11,000 years ago. The earliest known inhabitants of the southern Lake Erie coast were the Erielhonan, also known as the "Eriez", an Iroquoian speaking tribe of Native Americans. Erielhonan referred to the "Cat" or "Raccoon" people, and the name "Erie" is a corruption of Erielhonan. This name became the name of the lake and county in which Presque Isle Park is located, as well as the name of the city nearest the park.

An Erielhonan legend taught that the Great Spirit led them to Presque Isle because of the wealth of game, the abundance of clean fresh water, and the cool breezes "coming from the land of snow and ice" (i.e., Canada). Another legend explains how the Erielhonan ventured into Lake Erie in search of the land where the sun set, but the spirit of the lake blew a fierce storm to keep them from finding it. To protect the Erielhonan from the storm, their god laid his outstretched arm into the lake, giving them safety during the storm. The god's arm remained in the lake, protecting the tribe's future generations.

The Erielhonan are believed to have lived and farmed on the peninsula. They fought several wars, the last starting in 1653 with the Five Nations of the Iroquois. Despite initial victories over the Senecas, in 1654 the Erielhonans' largest village, Rique (at the modern city of Erie), was destroyed by 1,800 Iroquois warriors. By 1656, the Erielhonan had been largely destroyed as a distinct people, although some survivors were adopted by the Iroquois, who primarily absorbed them into the Seneca community.

=== Forts, settlers, and the War of 1812 ===
The French first named the peninsula in the 1720s; presque-isle means peninsula (lit. 'almost an island') in French. They built Fort Presque Isle at the modern city of Erie in the summer of 1753, naming it for the peninsula that protected the fort. The French also built two "military outposts" on Presque Isle itself. The first outpost was situated at the entrance to the peninsula, and the second was constructed at the easternmost point. During the French and Indian War, the French abandoned their outposts and burned their fort in 1759. The British constructed a new fort of the same name that year, which later fell to Native American forces on June 19, 1763, during Pontiac's Rebellion.

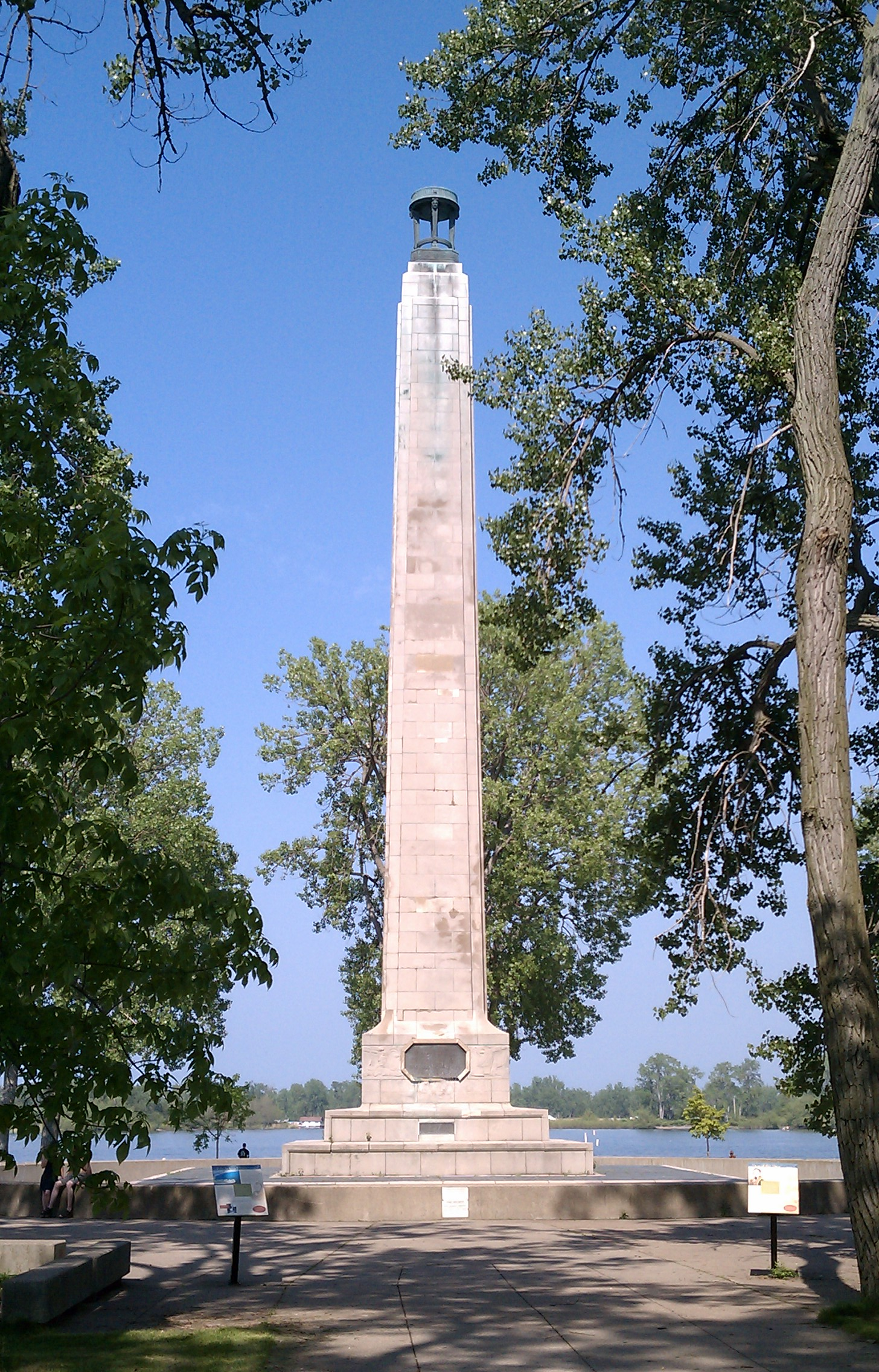
The Perry Monument on Presque Isle commemorates the U.S. naval victory on Lake Erie in the War of 1812.

Presque Isle passed from British to American control after the American Revolutionary War, and the Iroquois sold their rights to the land containing the peninsula to the United States at the second Treaty of Fort Stanwix in 1784. Pennsylvania did not acquire an undisputed title to the land until it purchased the Erie Triangle from the federal government on April 3, 1792. In 1795 General Anthony Wayne built a new, American "Fort Presque Isle", and on April 18 of that year the town of "Presqu' Ile", since renamed Erie, was laid out near it. Wayne died at the fort on December 15, 1796, and was originally buried there.

Erie County was formed from Allegheny County on March 12, 1800. Millcreek Township, which initially contained both the Presque Isle peninsula and the village of Erie, was one of the original townships. Erie was named the county seat in 1803, incorporated as a borough in 1805, and became a city in 1851.

During the War of 1812, Presque Isle played a part in the victory over the British in the Battle of Lake Erie. Oliver Hazard Perry, commander of the American fleet, made strategic use of the bay as a place to construct six of the nine ships in his fleet. Using this location protected the men by creating an obstacle, forcing potential attackers to circumnavigate the peninsula to reach them.

The "Little Bay" near the tip of the peninsula where the ships sheltered, next to the current Perry's Monument, was later named "Misery Bay" because of the hardships during the winter of 1813–1814, after the men returned there from battle. Many men suffered from smallpox and were kept in quarantine near the bay. Many infected men died and were buried in what is now called Graveyard Pond.

After the Battle of Lake Erie on September 10, 1813, Perry's two largest ships were severely damaged, and the US Brig Lawrence was intentionally sunk in Misery Bay. The Lawrence was raised in 1875 but was burned while on display at the 1876 Centennial Exposition. The US Brig Niagara was initially repaired, then sunk for preservation in 1820 and raised in 1913, and parts of it were eventually used in the current Niagara, based across Presque Isle Bay in Erie.

=== Lighthouses and Coast Guard ===
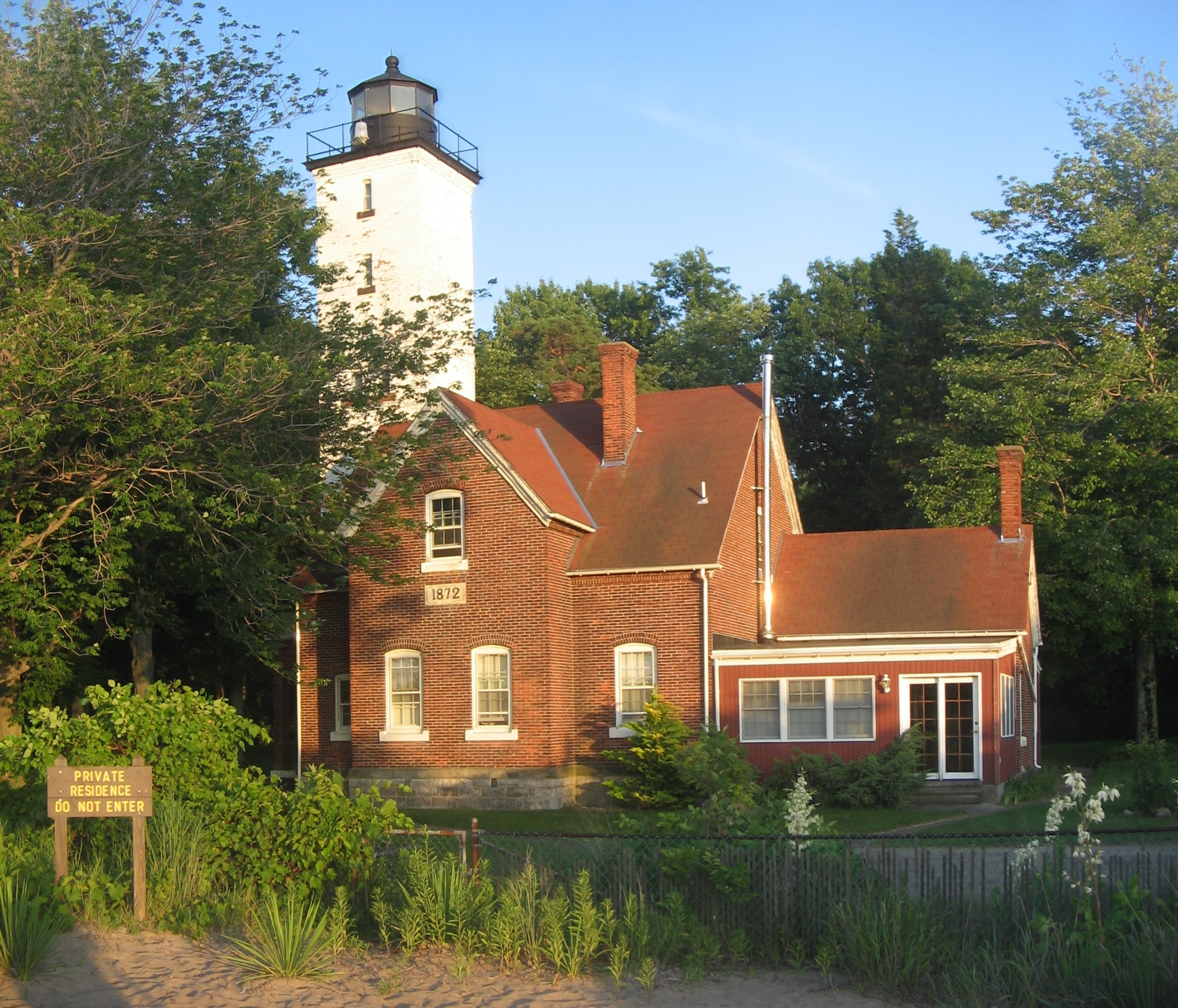
The Presque Isle Light began operation in 1873 and is still in service today.

The Presque Isle peninsula forms Presque Isle Bay, which serves as a natural harbor for Erie. During the 19th century, as navigation on Lake Erie grew increasingly critical, shipping aids were constructed on Presque Isle. As of 2007, two main lighthouses can be found in the park. The Erie Harbor North Pier Light began as a wooden tower, erected in 1830. In 1858, a stronger steel structure was imported from France and installed at Erie to replace the wooden beacon, which a schooner had damaged. This light still stands at the far eastern side of the park, near the inlet between the lake and the bay.

The Presque Isle Light was constructed in 1872 on the north side of Presque Isle and was lit on July 12, 1873. This light is 74-foot-tall (23 m), with a red brick house that was used as a lighthouse keeper residence, and later a park residence. Today, the lighthouse is maintained by the United States Coast Guard and flashes a white light to warn ships of the sandy peninsula that juts into Lake Erie. The light station is open to public tours from Memorial Day through Labor Day on weekends, weather permitting (see presqueislelighthouse.org). A third, more miniature lighthouse was built in 1906 by the Erie Waterworks on the Presque Isle Bay side of the peninsula. Today it stands in the ferry landing for the Presque Isle Water Taxi service, south of the former waterworks along the state park's multi-purpose trail on the southeast side of Presque Isle.

United States Life-Saving Service District 9 opened a life-saving station at Presque Isle in 1876. William Clark was the keeper from 1877 until he drowned in 1891. He was succeeded by Andrew Jansen, who was the keeper until 1914. When the Life-Saving Service and the Revenue Cutter Service merged in 1915 to become the United States Coast Guard, LSS Presque Isle, also called the Erie life-saving station, became Coast Guard Station #236. The station, still in operation, is assigned to the Ninth District of the United States Coast Guard.

=== Modern era and state park ===
In 1908, Erie started building a waterworks on Presque Isle to provide fresh water for the city. Water from Lake Erie was pumped into two reservoirs on the peninsula, where particulates in the water were allowed to settle, removing them from the lake water. After treatment, the water flowed into the city's water supply lines. In 1917, a pumphouse powered by a steam engine was built, which pumped water from one basin into the other, then across Presque Isle Bay to Erie. This system of supplying drinking water for Erie operated until 1949. The pumphouse is now used for zebra mussel control and as a concession stand for bicycle and quadracycle rentals within the state park.

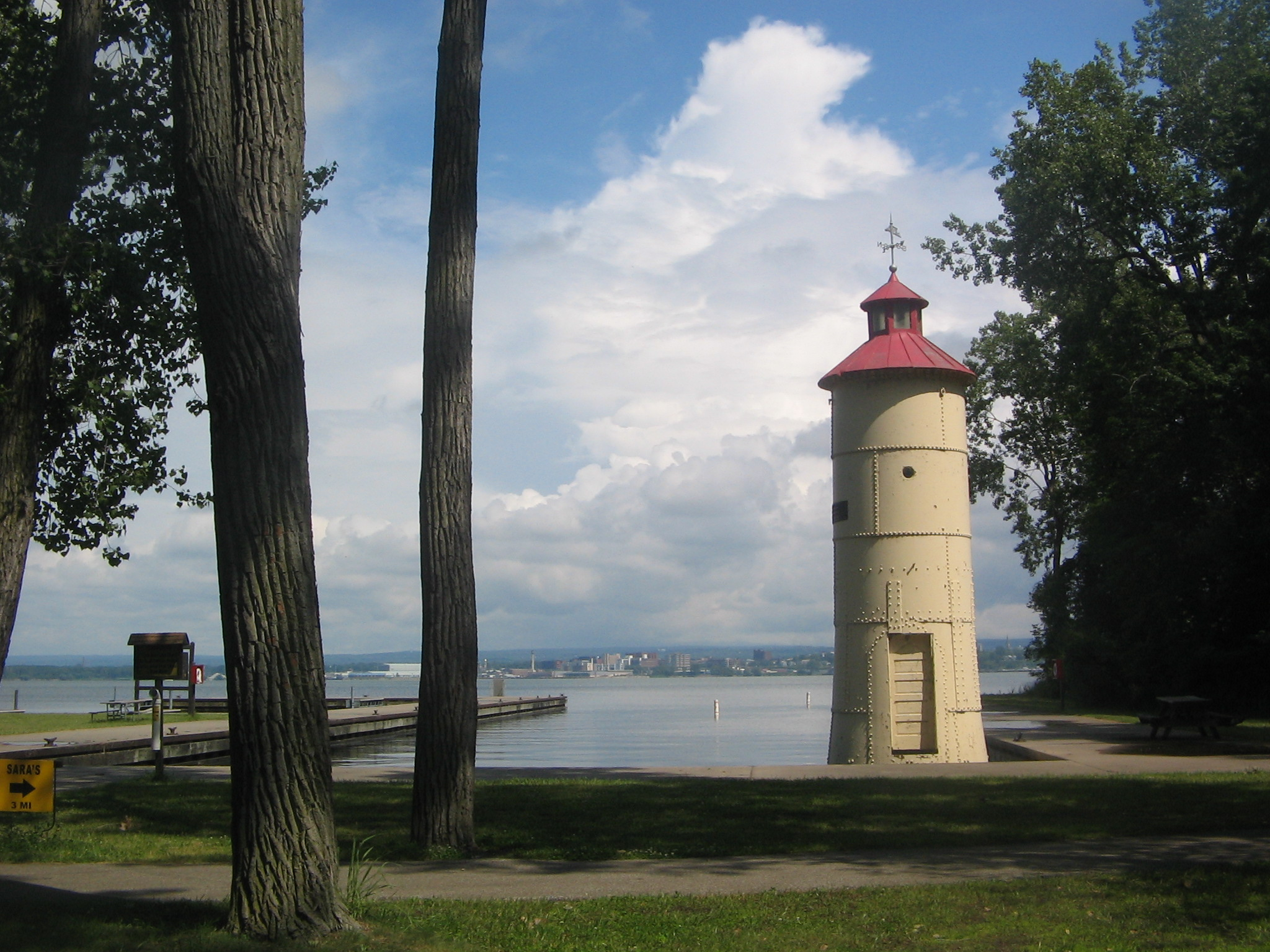
The small lighthouse along the multipurpose trail in the state park, near the former waterworks

As Pennsylvania's only surf beach, the Presque Isle beaches were already a popular attraction when the state legislature authorized the creation of the "Pennsylvania State Park at Erie" in May 1921. Oversight was given to the new "State Park and Harbor Commission of Erie", including local representation, instead of to the state Department of Forests and Waters. Presque Isle quickly became the most popular state park in Pennsylvania. Presque Isle was an early example of locating state parks near cities, a trend that would become prevalent statewide only in the 1960s.

The first paved road was built in the park in 1924, and today 13 miles (21 km) of roads run through the park. Pennsylvania Route 832 is the main road into the park, and is subsequently known as Peninsula Drive. Presque Isle has been referred to as "Peninsula State Park". The Perry Monument in the park was constructed in 1926 near Misery Bay and the burials in Graveyard Pond.

By 1937, official state publications were referring to the park as "Presque Isle State Park", and that same year, it led the state park system with 1.4 million visitors. In the 1950s the peninsula was enlarged to accommodate new roads and parking, using 3 million square yards (2,500,000 m^{2}) of sand dredged from the interior of the peninsula. The resulting basin became the current marina. Other new facilities included three modern bath houses built in 1957. That same year, Gull Point (at the eastern end of the peninsula) was named a nature preserve by the state.

Presque Isle was named a National Natural Landmark by the National Park Service in 1967. A recommendation was made to abolish the independent board as early as 1930, although this did not come about until January 19, 1971, with the creation of the state Department of Environmental Resources (which later became the DCNR). From 1989 to 1992, over 50 breakwaters were built along the western and northern shore of the peninsula to help control erosion. In 1997 the park's Important Bird Area (IBA) was one of the first 73 IBAs established in Pennsylvania. As part of the State Parks 2000 strategic plan of the Pennsylvania Department of Conservation and Natural Resources (DCNR), Gull Point was named a "State Park Natural Area for rare and migratory shorebirds to rest, feed and possibly nest".

The Tom Ridge Environmental Center at the entrance to the park opened in May 2006. As of 2007, the Pennsylvania DCNR Bureau of Parks, which administers all 120 Pennsylvania state parks, had chosen Presque Isle for its "25 Must-See Pennsylvania State Parks" list, citing its status as Pennsylvania's only surf beach, its status as a National Natural Landmark, and its "geological and biological diversity and its historic significance". Scenes for the film The Road were shot at Presque Isle in April 2008, with Beach 10 used as a seashore.

A weak tornado touched down in the state park on June 27, 2010. Rated EF0 on the Enhanced Fujita Scale, it downed power lines and trees near the Stull Interpretive Center, and also damaged a nearby observation platform. Presque Isle was closed on June 28 to facilitate the clean-up of the debris and reopened the next morning.

During Hurricane Sandy in October 2012, parts and remnants of the storm reached Presque Isle. The park was closed in preparation for the storm, with waves expected to reach 14–18 feet and high winds anticipated. The storm was expected to be severe, but it was not. Only 8-foot waves were recorded, and not as high winds either. The park emerged with only minor flooding, a few downed trees, and the loss of power at the park marina.

== Geology and climate ==
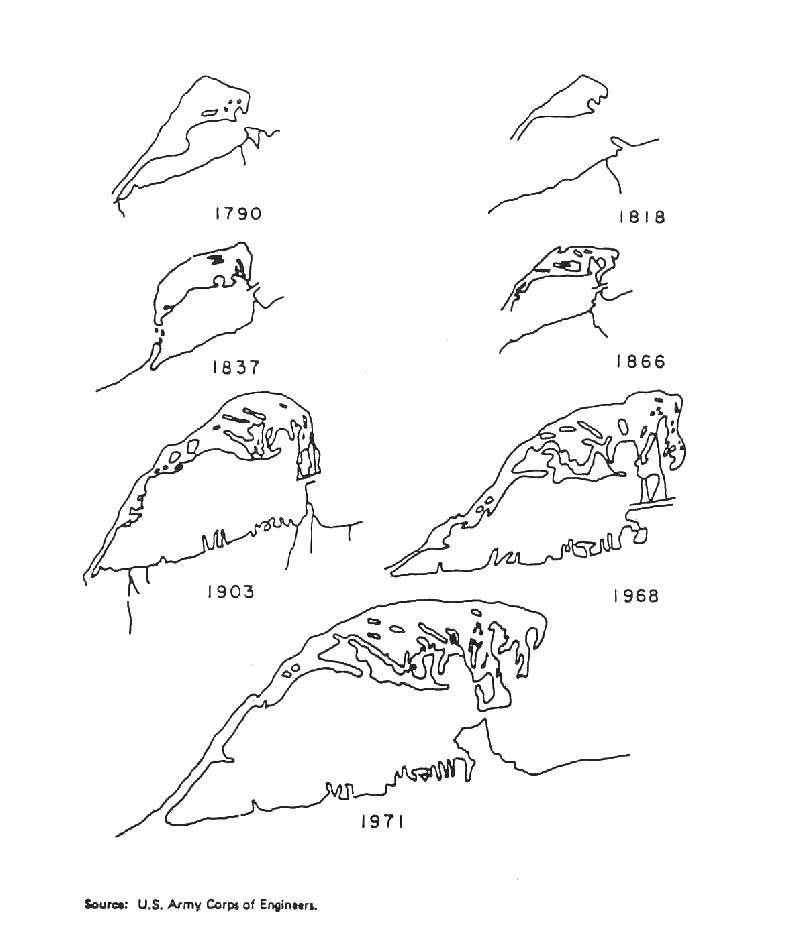
Migration of Presque Isle from 1790 to 1971

Presque Isle is a recurved sand spit formed during the last glacial period, or ice age, when the Laurentide Ice Sheet advanced into the basin now occupied by Lake Erie, and, when it retreated to the north between 12,370 BC and 12,790 BC, left behind a moraine consisting of clay, sand, and gravel which initially formed the peninsula. The deposits are constantly being reworked by wave action and gradually migrating to the northeast due to longshore drift.

The French term presqu'île, the origin of the park's name, means "peninsula", or, literally, "almost an island". Despite its name, Presque Isle has been an island for brief periods, cut off from the mainland several times since 1819—the longest stretch was from 1832 to 1864. In the 1950s, to combat erosion, the state and federal governments built sets of concrete seawalls and perpendicular groins. In 1992, a series of 58 breakwaters were also constructed to help capture sand and significantly slow its movement eastward. Even with the substantial engineering projects, sand must be relocated from tombolos which form behind the breakwaters, and new sand must be trucked in annually to replenish the beaches.

Presque Isle protects the natural Presque Isle Bay, which creates a deep and wide harbor for the city of Erie. The bay is often filled with pleasure craft as well as cargo ships from all over the world that use the Great Lakes shipping port. Erie became an international port after the opening of the Saint Lawrence Seaway in 1959.

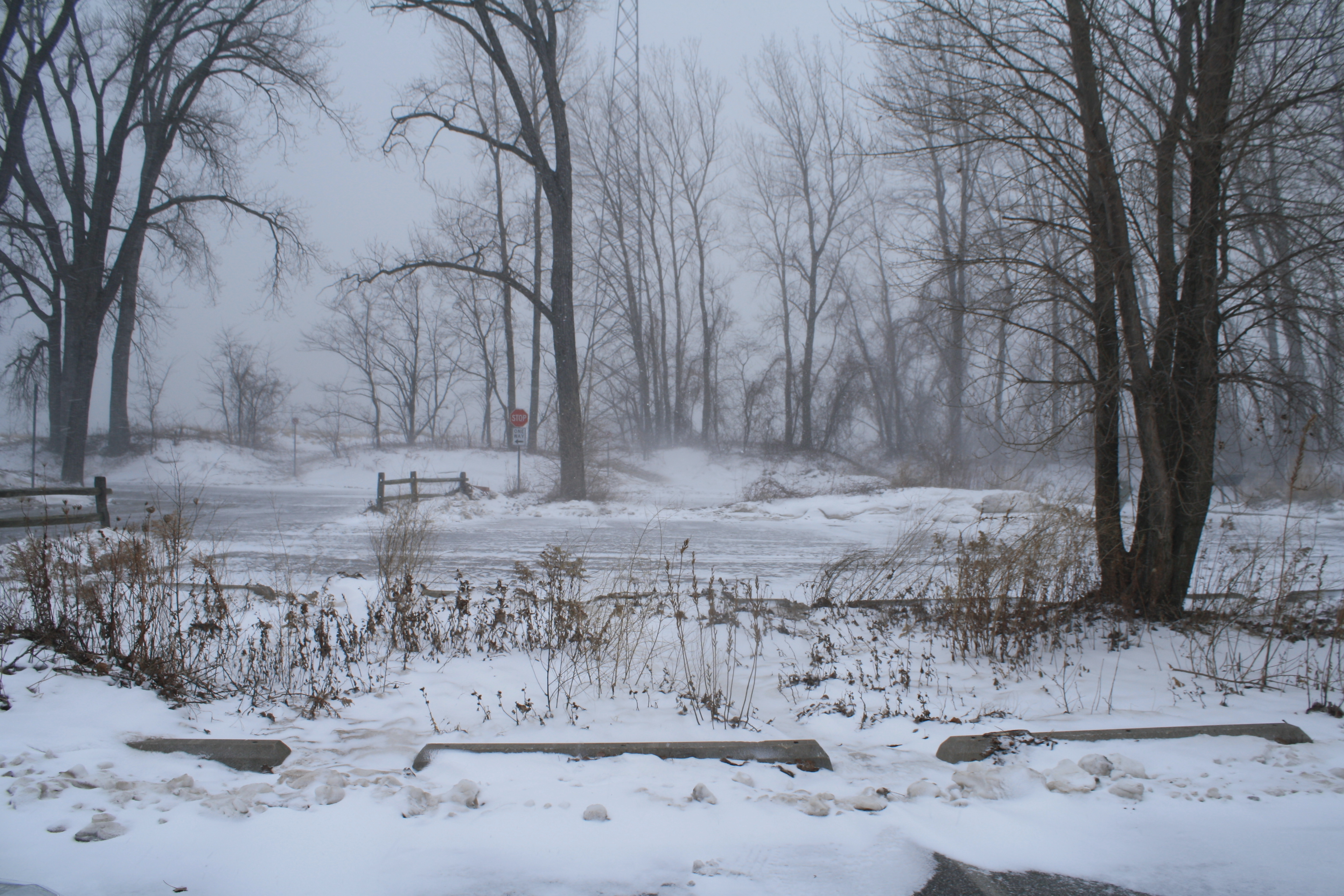
A winter day at Presque Isle State Park

Owing to the park's location relative to Erie, its climate is similar to that of the city. Erie and the peninsula are located in a snow belt that stretches from Cleveland to Syracuse and Watertown; accordingly, its winters are typically cold, with heavy lake-effect snow, but also with occasional stretches of mild weather that cause accumulated snow to melt. The Erie region lies in the humid continental zone (Köppen Dfa). Presque Isle's lakeside location helps to temper summer heat, with an average of only 3.8 days of 90 °F (32 °C)+ highs annually, and the highest temperature ever recorded was 100 °F (38 °C) on June 25, 1988; there is an average of 2.5 days with lows of 0 °F (−18 °C) or colder annually, and the lowest temperature ever recorded was −18 °F (−28 °C) on January 19, 1994, and February 16, 2015. Ice dunes typically form along the beaches in the winter from snowfall and frozen spray, and usually reach a height over 6 feet (1.8 m). The dunes protect the beaches from erosion during winter storms, and continue growing until the surface of Lake Erie freezes in the winter.

Climate data for Erie, Pennsylvania (Erie International Airport), 1981–2010 normals, extremes 1873–present
Month	Jan	Feb	Mar	Apr	May	Jun	Jul	Aug	Sep	Oct	Nov	Dec	Year
Record high °F (°C)	73 (23)	75 (24)	82 (28)	89 (32)	91 (33)	100 (38)	99 (37)	96 (36)	99 (37)	89 (32)	82 (28)	75 (24)	100 (38)
Mean daily maximum °F (°C)	33.7 (0.9)	35.5 (1.9)	43.8 (6.6)	56.1 (13.4)	66.6 (19.2)	75.7 (24.3)	79.8 (26.6)	78.6 (25.9)	71.9 (22.2)	60.8 (16.0)	49.9 (9.9)	38.1 (3.4)	57.7 (14.3)
Daily mean °F (°C)	27.2 (−2.7)	28.3 (−2.1)	35.7 (2.1)	47.1 (8.4)	57.4 (14.1)	67.1 (19.5)	71.7 (22.1)	70.5 (21.4)	63.8 (17.7)	53.0 (11.7)	43.3 (6.3)	32.4 (0.2)	49.9 (9.9)
Mean daily minimum °F (°C)	20.8 (−6.2)	21.1 (−6.1)	27.5 (−2.5)	38.1 (3.4)	48.2 (9.0)	58.4 (14.7)	63.5 (17.5)	62.5 (16.9)	55.8 (13.2)	45.3 (7.4)	36.6 (2.6)	26.6 (−3.0)	42.1 (5.6)
Record low °F (°C)	−18 (−28)	−18 (−28)	−9 (−23)	7 (−14)	26 (−3)	32 (0)	44 (7)	37 (3)	33 (1)	23 (−5)	6 (−14)	−11 (−24)	−18 (−28)
Average precipitation inches (mm)	2.95 (75)	2.39 (61)	2.95 (75)	3.33 (85)	3.44 (87)	3.76 (96)	3.54 (90)	3.47 (88)	4.61 (117)	4.05 (103)	3.93 (100)	3.74 (95)	42.16 (1,071)
Average snowfall inches (cm)	29.6 (75)	18.2 (46)	13.7 (35)	3.2 (8.1)	—	0.0 (0.0)	0.0 (0.0)	0.0 (0.0)	0.0 (0.0)	0.2 (0.51)	8.5 (22)	27.5 (70)	100.9 (256)
Average precipitation days (≥ 0.01 in)	19.6	15.0	14.3	13.9	12.8	11.1	10.2	10.3	11.1	13.4	15.5	19.2	166.4
Average snowy days (≥ 0.1 in)	16.5	11.7	8.0	2.7	0.0	0.0	0.0	0.0	0.0	0.2	4.4	13.6	57.1
Average relative humidity (%)	74.5	75.4	71.9	67.9	68.9	71.3	71.7	74.0	74.5	71.1	72.3	75.0	72.4
Source: NOAA (relative humidity 1961–1990)

== Flora, fauna, and habitat ==
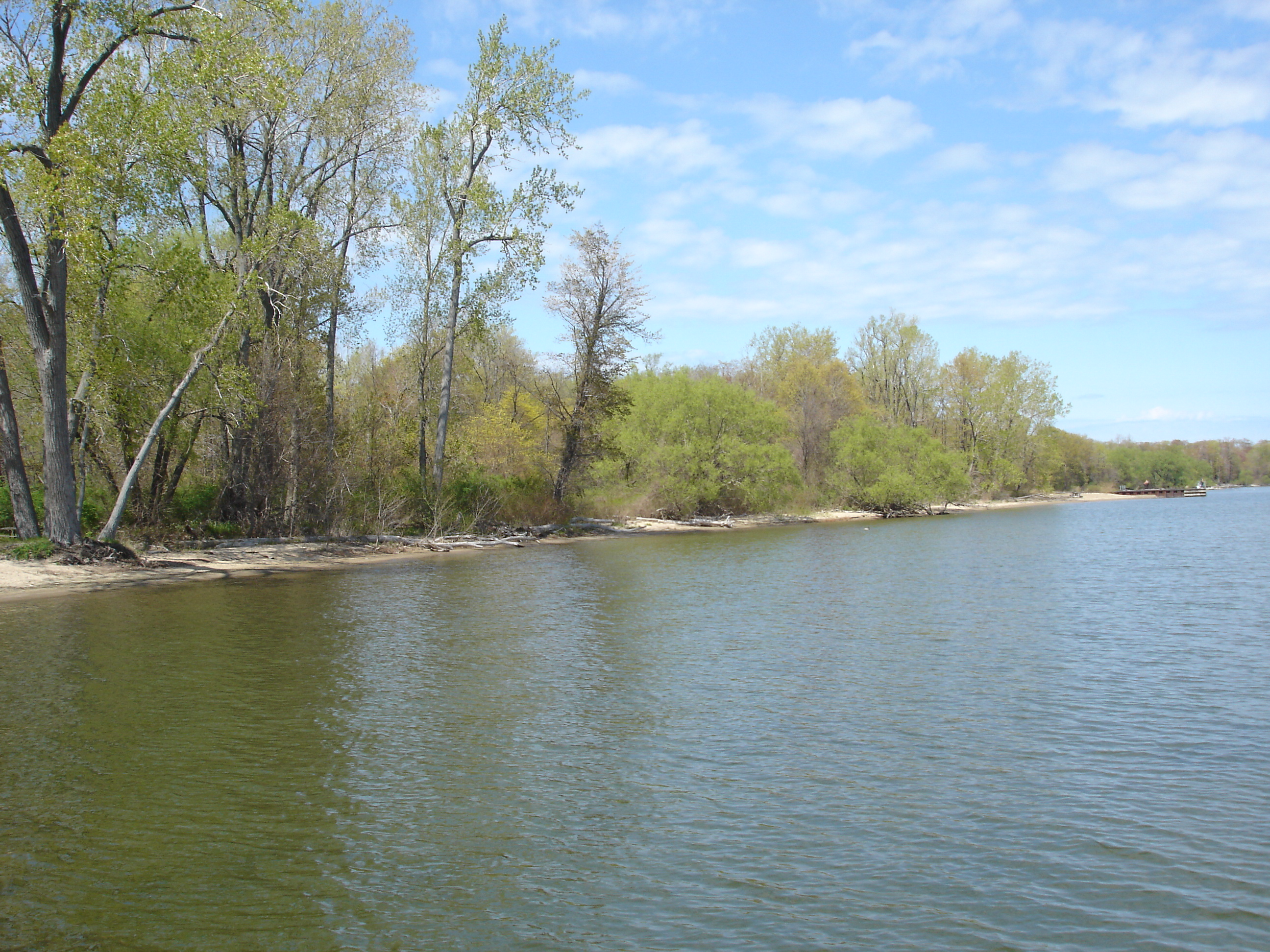
The shore on the bay side, looking north

=== Ecological zones and succession ===
According to the DCNR, because it has so "many unique habitats, Presque Isle contains a greater number of the state's endangered, threatened and rare species than any other area of comparable size in Pennsylvania". The DCNR recognizes seven different ecological zones within Presque Isle State Park, each with a different plant and animal community. These zones are: Lake Erie; the beaches and shoreline; sandy plain and ponds; dunes and ridges; marshes and old ponds; heath and sub-climax forest; and the climax forest. Lake Erie, which surrounds the park, is the first zone and is home to 80 species of fish and at least six species of crustaceans.

The remaining ecological zones, with their progression from shoreline to climax forest, are a classic illustration of the concept of ecological succession. Much of this progression is due to the changing nature of Presque Isle and its shifting shoreline and dunes. The shoreline, the second zone, is formed by wave action and is in equilibrium between erosion and deposition, with the initial plants stabilizing the sand of the new shoreline. The newly formed sandy plain and the ponds that have formed within it comprise the third zone. The ponds start as trapped pockets of lake water and can erode or be filled by wind-blown sand or drifting dunes. The new ponds provide habitat for plants and animals: for example, the state park is home to 89 species of Odonata (dragonflies and damselflies) and Lepidoptera, including 35 different butterflies, as well as 84 different sorts of spiders.

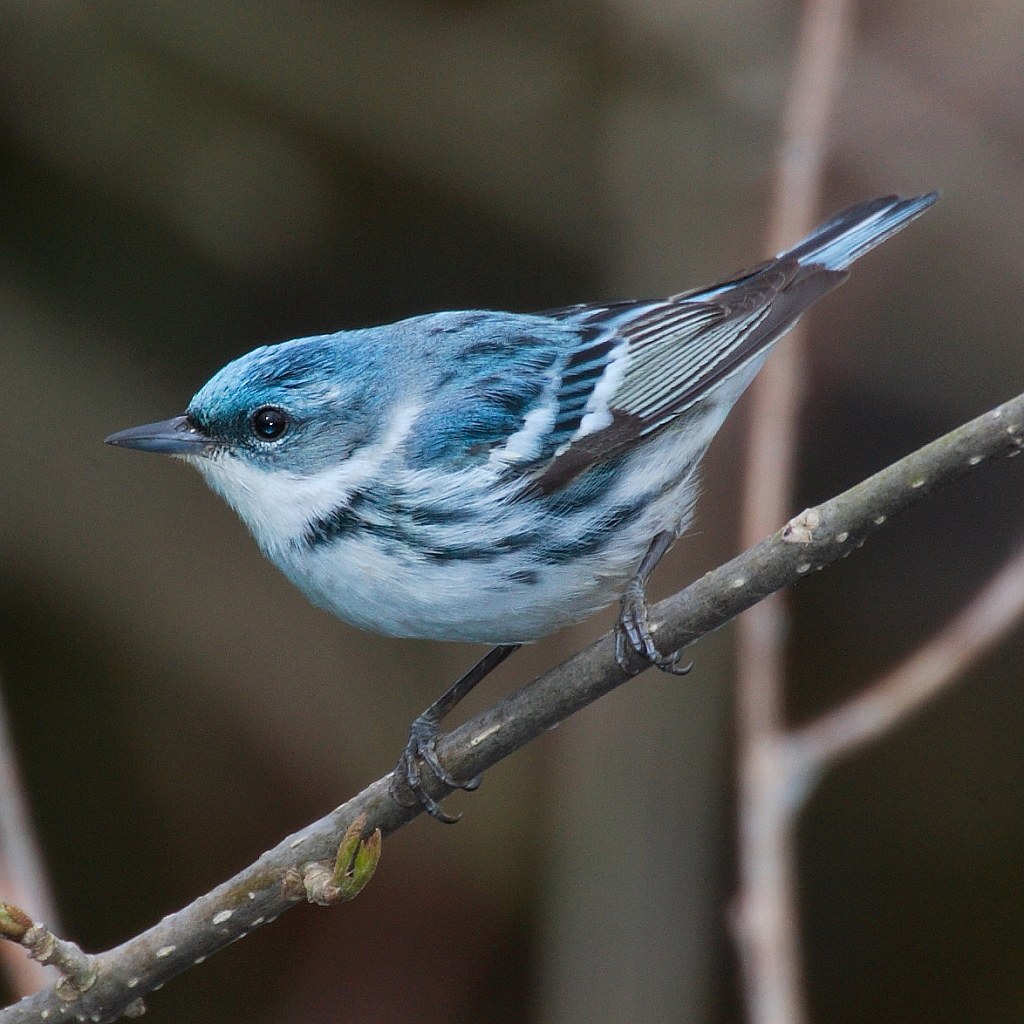
The cerulean warbler is a rare species found in the park.

Dunes and ridges are the fourth zone, formed when beach sand transported by wind and waves becomes trapped by vegetation. Dunes grow and are stabilized by grasses, followed by other types of vegetation. This process offers habitat for amphibians, birds, mammals, and reptiles. Old dunes can become more permanent ridges, which shelter ponds. These dunes, ridges, and ponds are often remnants of previous shorelines. At Presque Isle State Park, "Long Pond", just east of the marina, dunes and ridges mark the eastern shoreline as it existed in 1862. The fifth ecological zone consists of old ponds and marshes. Ponds protected by dunes and ridges are more stable; these old ponds support a greater variety of plant and animal life, and as they fill with vegetation, they become marshes. Old ponds and marshes have high biodiversity. Nearly 400 species of terrestrial vertebrates live on Presque Isle, including 318 different birds, 48 kinds of mammals, 13 types of amphibians, and 19 reptile species.

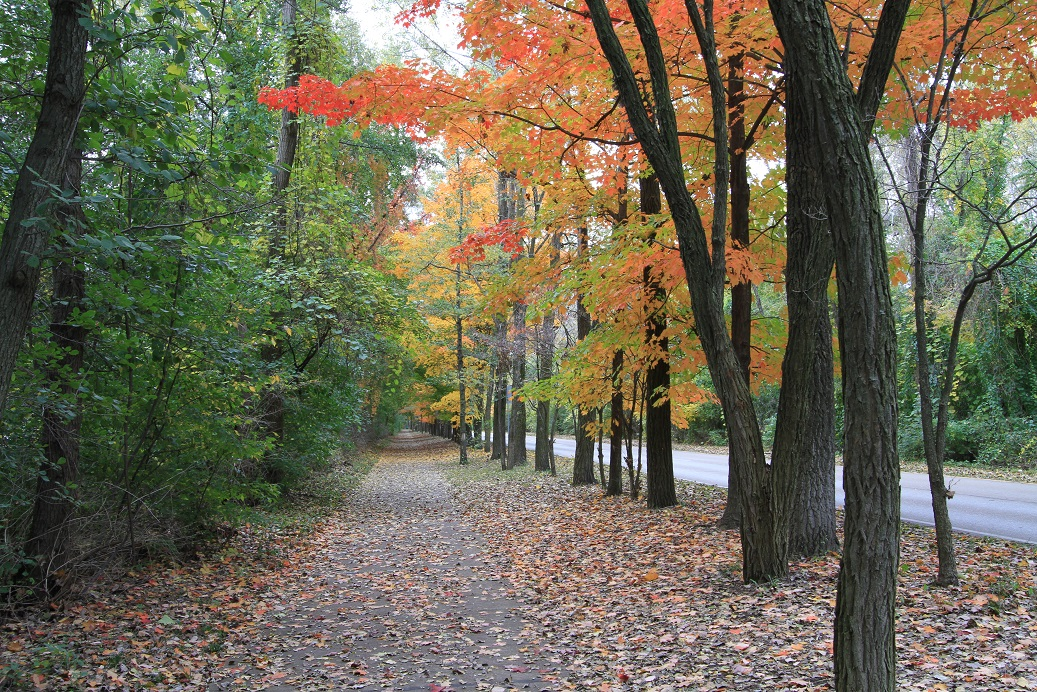
Colors of Autumn

The sixth and seventh ecological zones are characterized by their shrub and tree species. Presque Isle State Park is home to 633 plant species (195 monocotyledons, 410 dicotyledons, 5 gymnosperms, 5 horsetails, 13 ferns, and 5 mosses). The sixth zone, thicket and sub-climax forest, forms when shrubs grow on dying marshes, followed by small trees. The trees shade and thin out the thickets of shrubs, leading to a sub-climax forest. The seventh and final stage is climax forest, where many large trees form a canopy. If left undisturbed, this ecological succession is believed to take between 500 and 600 years, although visitors to parts of Presque Isle State Park can walk through all of these zones in 5 miles (8 km).

The Pennsylvania Audubon Society has listed the park as Pennsylvania Important Bird Area (IBA) #1, and it considered one of the best birdwatching sites in Pennsylvania. The diversity of habitats on the peninsula makes it an ideal home for over 320 species of birds. (For comparison, the United States has about 925 bird species.) Forty-five of the bird species found in the park are listed as "endangered" or "threatened", including the piping plover, cerulean warbler, rusty blackbird and saltmarsh sharp-tailed sparrow. Waterfowl and wading birds live at Presque Isle year round. Four species of gull and three species of tern can be seen at Gull Point during the summer months. The majority of the collection during the annual Christmas Bird Count, which has been held in Erie County since 1956, is garnered from observations made by volunteers within the park. Many different species of plants and animals can also be found at Presque Isle State Park due to the wide variety of ecological zones.

=== Gull Point Natural Area ===
Human beings have played a role in the ecology of Presque Isle since at least the time of the Erielhonan. The natural drift of sand is hindered or stopped by breakwaters, permanent structures, and roads. Roads also fail to absorb rainwater, leading to erosion and disruption of natural habitats. Excavations, such as those for the waterworks basins or the marina, have destroyed habitats; however, yearly artificial replenishment with sand helps create new ones. One area within the park is closed to all public use from April to November to minimize the impact of humans: it is the easternmost part of the park, Gull Point.

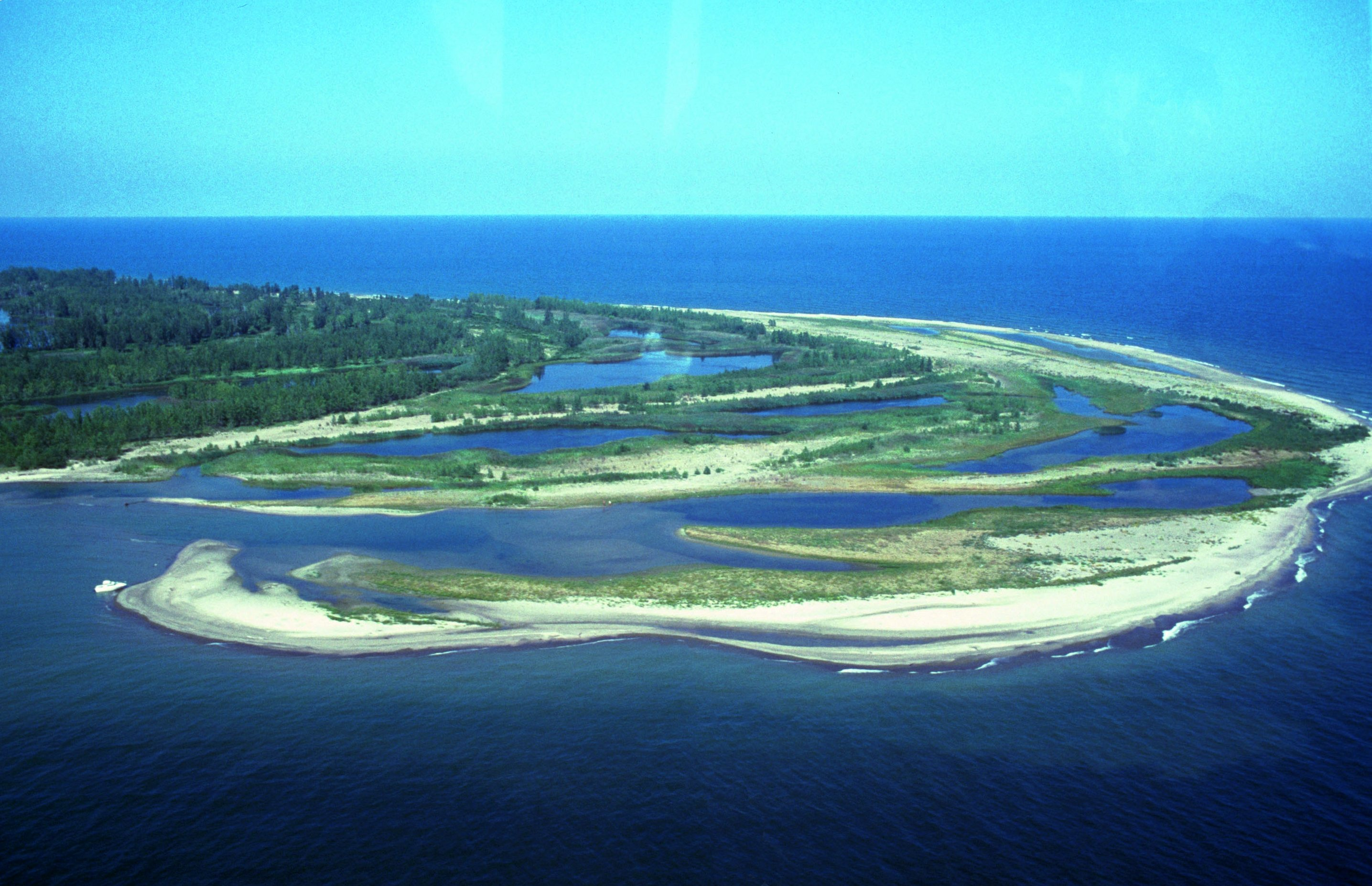
Aerial view of Gull Point and Presque Isle State Park from the east

Gull Point at Presque Isle State Park has been designated as a Pennsylvania "State Park Natural Area". These areas provide locations for scientific observation of natural systems, protecting examples of natural interest and beauty, as well as unique and typical habitats for animals and plants.

Gull Point covers 319 acres (129 ha), of which 67 acres (27 ha) form the Natural Area and are closed to park visitors during the height of the bird migrations. The natural area is a haven and resting spot for migrating and nesting birds. Many of the species of birds that rest at Gull Point are not seen anywhere else in Pennsylvania. Presque Isle lies on the Atlantic Flyway, a primary migratory path, and some of these birds migrate from as far north as the Arctic Circle to South America. They pass through in November on their long flights south and return in April on their flights north.

Erosion and deposition of sand, which have formed Gull Point, continue to change it. From May 1991 to October 2006, Gull Point lost a total of 4.6 acres (1.9 ha), and if this trend continues, it may become an island. After the breakwaters were constructed in 1992, less sand was added to replenish the beaches. Federal funding for sand replenishment has been cut off since 2005, leading to a further reduction in the amount of sand added to the peninsula. Without new sand, erosion has reduced the northern beaches of Gull Point, even as regions to the east and south have continued to grow at a slower rate, resulting in a net yearly loss of 0.4 acres (0.2 ha).

== Tom Ridge Environmental Center ==
The Tom Ridge Environmental Center is a "green" building.

The Tom Ridge Environmental Center (TREC) is the gateway to, and administrative center for, Presque Isle State Park, as well as housing interactive educational exhibits, a "Discovery Center", classrooms, and research laboratories. The center, which officially opened on May 26, 2006, is situated on 12 acres (5 ha) acres, just off Route 832 on a bluff overlooking Lake Erie. TREC is named for former Pennsylvania Governor Tom Ridge, "who grew up in Erie, worked at the park as a young man and provided funding for the center and numerous Presque Isle projects during his administration".

Construction on the center began in 2002, although the idea for such a center at Presque Isle was some 50 years old. The Presque Isle State Park headquarters began operating from TREC in 2005, and it is also home to offices for the Pennsylvania Department of Environmental Protection's Great Lakes and Coastal Zone Management programs, the DCNR Recreation and Conservation program, as well as Presque Isle Audubon, Lake-Erie Allegheny Earth Force, Pennsylvania Sea Grant, Presque Isle Partnership, and the Purple Martin Conservation Association. The Regional Science Consortium, "a collaborative, non-profit organization that focuses on and coordinates educational and research projects for Lake Erie and the upper Ohio River Basin", was organized in 2002 and is based at TREC. Its 32 member organizations include schools, school districts, colleges, universities, museums, state agencies, conservation groups, and private corporations from Pennsylvania, Ohio, and Ontario.

Facilities at the 65,000-square-foot (6,000 m^{2}) Tom Ridge Environmental Center include eight research laboratories (including several large aquariums) for the RSC, several classrooms, a "Discovery Center" for younger students to explore science hands-on, interpretive exhibits highlighting local and regional flora and fauna, as well as the human history and culture of the area. The center also offers a large-format movie theater, a smaller theater, a gift shop, a cafeteria, and a 75-foot (23 m) tall observation tower that overlooks Lake Erie. The center was constructed as a "green" building and has received a Leadership in Energy and Environmental Design (LEED) rating from the United States Green Building Council. Besides supporting environmental research and education, the center is meant to "increase off-season use" of the state park.

== Recreation ==
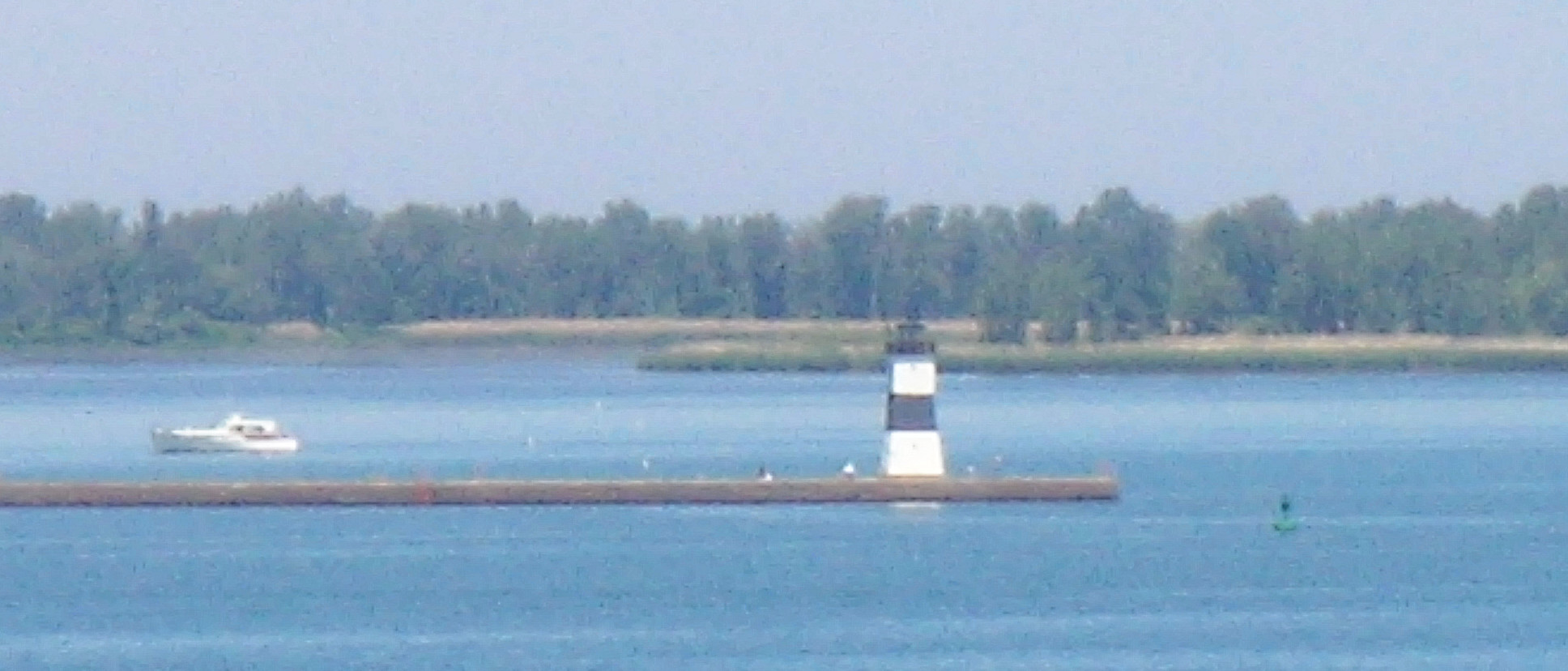
A pleasure craft near the North Pier Light

In addition to the facilities at TREC, Presque Isle State Park provides opportunities for daytime recreational activity along the Lake Erie and Presque Isle Bay coastlines, as well as on its inland trails and lagoons. Boating, canoeing, fishing, and water skiing are common summer activities, while hiking, biking, inline skating, and bird watching are some of the popular inland activities. Ice fishing, ice boating, ice skating, and cross-country skiing are popular activities for winter visitors. Two of the beaches feature volleyball courts; Beach 6 has six courts and Beach 11 has one. No admission fee is charged for the park or TREC.

Boats of nearly any variety are permitted on Lake Erie at Presque Isle State Park. Boats with internal combustion engines are prohibited in the interior lagoons, except for Graveyard Pond, where a concession rents motor and pontoon boats, canoes, and kayaks for recreational use. The park also has a 500-slip marina, open to boats up to 42-foot-long (13 m), and five boat launches. Boat tours provide views of the park, lake, bay, and Erie skyline. All boats must have a current registration from any state or country. Water conditions on Lake Erie can change with little notice, so boaters are advised to exercise caution.

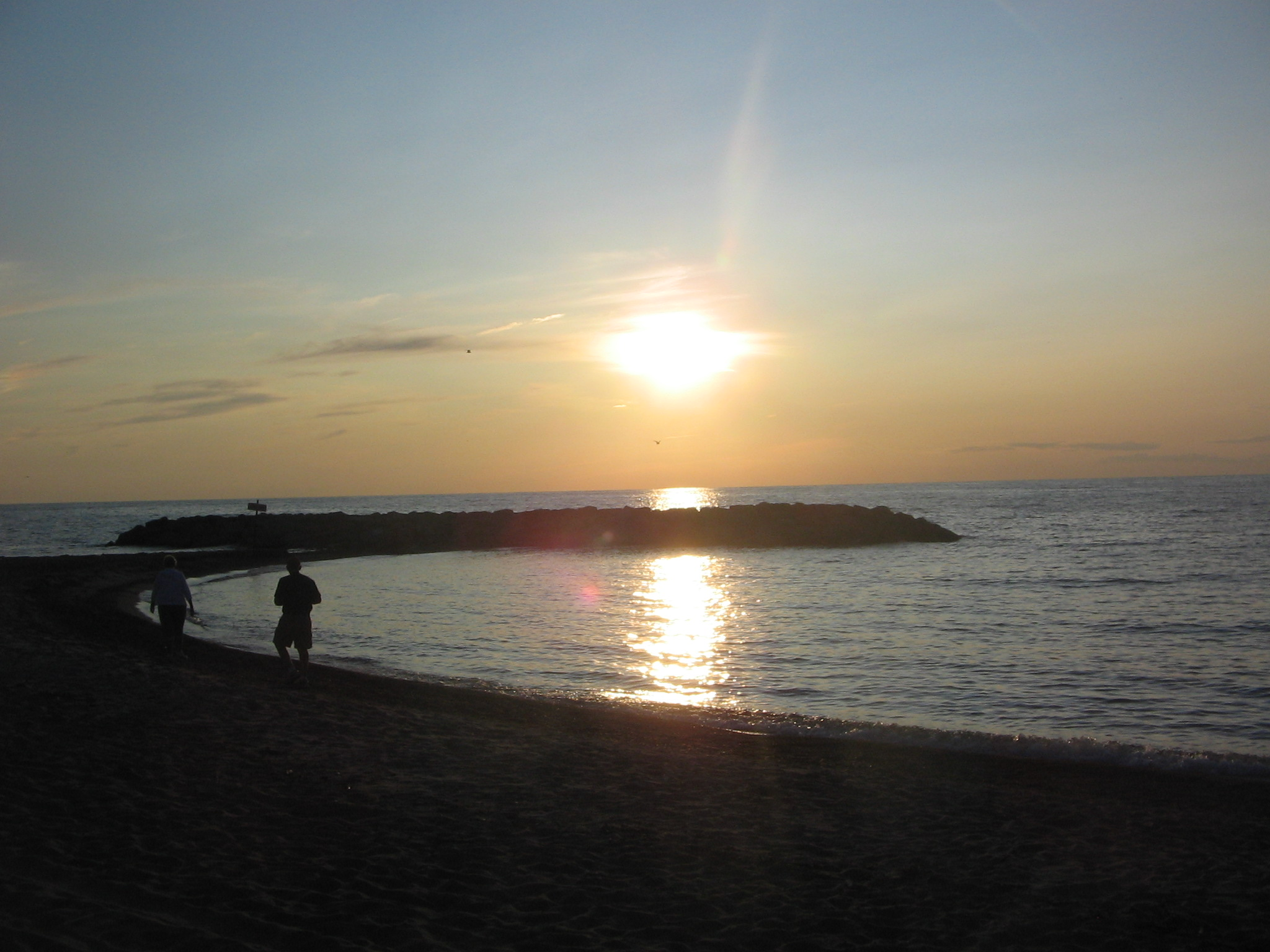
A sunset at one of the beaches facing Lake Erie on Presque Isle

Water skiing and scuba diving are permitted at Presque Isle State Park in designated waters of Lake Erie. Water skiing must take place in Presque Isle Bay or out on Lake Erie and is prohibited within 500 feet (150 m) of the shore. Scuba divers must be certified and are required to register at the park office to obtain information on the waters that are open to diving.

Presque Isle State Park has two distinct fishing zones. Lake Erie is home to perch, trout, walleye, bass, and steelhead. Presque Isle Bay is the home of muskellunge, northern pike, crappie, smelt, as well as other fish that swim in from the lake. Trout fishing is also allowed in the two waterworks basins, which are stocked by the Pennsylvania Fish and Boat Commission. Hunting is prohibited at Presque Isle State Park except for controlled duck and goose hunting seasons in designated blinds.

Presque Isle State Park, which has 13 beaches, is home to the only surf swimming in Pennsylvania. Beaches are open from Memorial Day to Labor Day with swimming permitted when lifeguards are on duty from 10:00 EDT to 20:00 EDT. Extensive picnic facilities are available at most of the swimming areas.

== See also ==
- List of National Natural Landmarks in Pennsylvania
- Presqu'ile Provincial Park in Ontario
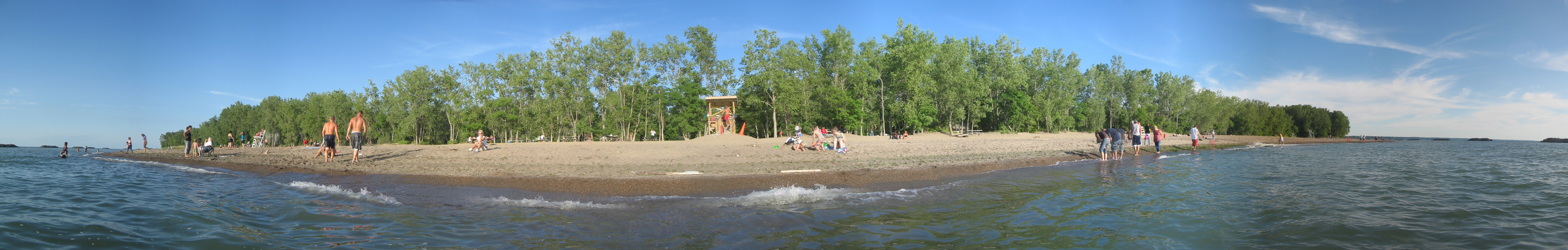
Panoramic view of Beach 6 from Lake Erie in Presque Isle State Park

== Sources ==
- Bates, Samuel P.; Brown, R. C.; Russell, N. W; Weakley, F. E; Whitman, Benjamin (1884). History of Erie County, Pennsylvania. Chicago: Warner, Beers & Co. OCLC 8622308.
- Gorecki, Richard J.; Pope, Joan (August 1993). Coastal Geologic and Engineering History of Presque Isle Peninsula, Pennsylvania (PDF) (Report). Vicksburg, Mississippi: United States Army Corps of Engineers, Waterways Experiment Station. Archived (PDF) from the original on March 3, 2016.
- Jennings, Otto Emory (1909). "A Botanical Survey of Presque Isle, Erie County, Pennsylvania". Annals of the Carnegie Museum. 5 (2–3). Pittsburgh: Carnegie Museum of Natural History: 289–421. doi:10.5962/p.331029. hdl:2027/hvd.32044103107710. S2CID 251479889.
- Cupper, Dan (1993). Our Priceless Heritage: Pennsylvania's State Parks 1893–1993. Harrisburg, Pennsylvania: Commonwealth of Pennsylvania, Pennsylvania Historical and Museum Commission for Department of Natural Resources, Bureau of State Parks. ISBN 0-89271-056-X.
