= Mom Rinker's Rock =

Coordinates: 40.034006°N 75.199099°W

Mom Rinker's Rock is a scenic outlook in Wissahickon Valley Park along the Wissahickon Creek in the city of Philadelphia, Pennsylvania, United States. It is located on a ridge on the eastern side of the park just a little north of the Walnut Lane Bridge, close by the statue dedicated to Toleration.

The outlook is named after Molly "Mom" Rinker (died in 1814 or 1815), a bartender and spy during the American Revolutionary War. She was known for supposedly gathering secret knowledge of plans and movements by secretly overhearing British soldiers who stopped at her bar to get drunk, talk between themselves of plans and missions which they planned to use against American troops during the war, after the British occupation of Philadelphia. Molly Rinker supposedly dropped balls of yarn from the lookout, containing messages about the British soldier's plans inside. American soldiers pass by, and where the soldiers would pick up the yarns and discover the notes to George Washington.

It has been said that Molly Rinker died in 1814 (or 1815) by accidentally falling off the same mountain cliff which she had dropped her notes 30 years earlier during the American Revolutionary War.

In 1883 John Welsh installed a marble statue of a man wearing Quaker clothing on Mom Rinker’s Rock. The statue had been carved by Herman Kirn, and is believed to be a likeness of William Penn. At the base of the statue the word "Toleration" is carved. Welsh was reported to have purchased the statue at the 1876 Centennial Exposition in Philadelphia. Welsh was a member of the Fairmount Park Commission for sixteen years, and donated acres of land to the park, including Mom Rinker’s Rock.

Here on May 15, 1847, the evening of a new moon, the American novelist, journalist, playwright, social activist, and labour organizer George Lippard was married to his young wife.

== Genealogy ==
Molly Rinker (died on 22 May 1814 or 1815) was said to be the daughter of a landowner named Jacob Rincker (or Rinker; died c. 1775) said to be a member of the known German-born Rincker family, and of the Lutheran Protestant faith, owned around 46 acres of land near Philadelphia, PA, by 1734, and died around 1775. The Rincker family immigrated in two waves to the colonies of Pennsylvania and Virginia, with the second wave arriving in Philadelphia in 1750, before ultimately settling in Virginia. Molly Rinker is also said to have two sisters named Susanna Rinker and Mary Rinker. Molly's sister Susanna Rinker, who died on 13 September 1807 in Philadelphia, PA, was the wife of an American Quaker of English descent named William Holgate (born c. 1725; died on 15 December 1815 in Philadelphia, PA) and mother of the American politician Jacob Holgate (1767–1832), who was the husband of Elizabeth Holgate (née Sheitz or Shutz, Jr.), who was the daughter of Jacob Sheitz or Shutz and his wife Elizabeth, Sr., and Molly's other sister Mary Rinker was the wife of a certain Mr. Keyser.
