= List of National Natural Landmarks in Pennsylvania =

Pennsylvanian national natural landscapes

There are 27 National Natural Landmarks in Pennsylvania.

Pennsylvania National Natural Landmarks (clickable map)

| Name | Image | Date | Location | County | Ownership | Description |
|---|---|---|---|---|---|---|
| Bear Meadows Natural Area | | 1965 | 40.406111°N 77.173889°W | Centre | public/state Rothrock State Forest | |
| Box Huckleberry Site | | April 1967 | 40.406111°N 77.173889°W | Perry | public/state Tuscarora State Forest | A 10-acre (4.0 ha) natural area which preserves a rare colony of box huckleberry over 1,000 years old. |
| Cook Forest State Park | | November 1967 | 41.323611°N 79.163889°W | Clarion; Forest; Jefferson | public/state | A 8,500-acre (3,440 ha) state park notable for its spectacular stands of old-growth Eastern White Pine and Eastern Hemlock, many from around 1644. |
| Ferncliff Peninsula Natural Area | | 1973 | 39.867555°N 79.498229°W | Fayette | public/state Ohiopyle State Park | This 100-acre (40 ha) peninsula is formed by a meander in the Youghiogheny River. It is a good example of a late successional forests in the Allegheny Mountains |
| Ferncliff Wildflower and Wildlife Preserve | | 1972 | 39.78259°N 76.24274°W | Lancaster | private/nonprofit | The vegetation within the Ferncliff Wildflower and Wildlife Preserve is an excellent example of a mixed mesophytic forest that occupies the valleys and ravines of the oak-chestnut forest region. |
| Florence Jones Reineman Wildlife Sanctuary | | 1973 | 40°16′0″N 77°16′0″W | Cumberland; Perry | private/family trust | Contains a 3,100-acre (1,255 ha) diverse ecological community. |
| Pine Creek Gorge | | 1968 | 41.271667°N 77.326944°W | Tioga; Lycoming | public/state Tioga State Forest | Known as the "Grand Canyon of Pennsylvania", a deep gorge carved by glacial meltwater. The maximum depth of the canyon is 1,450 feet (442 m) at Waterville, near the southern end. At Leonard Harrison and Colton Point State Parks, the depth is more than 800 feet and from rim to rim is approximately 4,000 feet (1200 m). Protects 160,000 acres (64,750 ha). |
| Hawk Mountain Sanctuary | | 1965 | 40.640833°N 75.992222°W | Berks; Schuylkill | private/nonprofit | A sanctuary on a Blue Mountain ridge, known as an excellent vantage point for hawk migrations. |
| Hearts Content Scenic Area | | 1973 or 1977 | 41.691°N 79.254°W | Warren | public/federal Allegheny National Forest | An old-growth white pine forest of 120 acres (49 ha). |
| Hemlocks Natural Area | | 1972 | 40.238418°N 77.641379°W | Perry | public/state Tuscarora State Forest | Features numerous old growth hemlock trees. |
| Hickory Run Boulder Field | | 1967 | 41.036111°N 75.683889°W | Carbon | public/state Hickory Run State Park | A 16.5-acre (7 ha) landscape of sandstone boulders, which were formed approximately 20,000 years ago. |
| Lake Lacawac | | 1968 | 41.382289°N 75.292078°W | Wayne | private/nonprofit | A 52-acre (21 ha) glacial lake surrounded by a hardwood conifer forest. |
| McConnells Mill State Park | | 1972 | 40.926667°N 80.19°W | Lawrence | public/state | Protects 2,546 acres (1,030 ha) of the Slippery Rock Creek gorge, including several waterfalls. |
| Monroe Border Fault | | 1980 | 40.579756°N 75.197556°W | Bucks | public/state Nockamixon State Park | An upland along the Delaware River, the area features a variety of exposed rocks from different geological ages. |
| Nay Aug Park Gorge and Waterfall | | 1989 | 41.401389°N 75.642778°W | Lackawanna | public/municipal | Located in an urban park, it features a rock-strewn, heavily wooded gorge. |
| Nottingham Park Serpentine Barrens | | 2009 | 39.740507°N 76.039112°W | Chester | private/nonprofit | A 651-acre (263 ha) county park on one of the largest outcrops of serpentine in the eastern US, which creates a savanna-like habitat with a number of unusual flora. |
| Presque Isle State Park | | 1967 | 42.163056°N 80.100833°W | Erie | public/state | A 3,112-acre (1,259 ha) sandy peninsula stretching into Lake Erie. |
| Reynolds Spring and Algerine Swamp Bogs | | 1974 | 41.550902°N 77.497481°W | Tioga; Lycoming | public/state Tioga State Forest | Contains two bogs of 1,302 acres (527 ha) and 84 acres (34 ha), which are surrounded by thick oak and pine groves. |
| The Glens Natural Area | | 1968 | 41°19′34″N 76°16′46″W | Columbia; Sullivan; Luzerne | public/state Ricketts Glen State Park | 2,845 acres (1,151 ha) of old growth forest, with many trees exceed 100 feet (30 m) in height. Twenty two separate named waterfalls are located in the area. |
| Snyder Middleswarth Natural Area | | 1967 | 40.81°N 77.283056°W | Snyder | public/state Bald Eagle State Forest | A hemlock, pine, and oak forest located on 500 acres (202 ha). |
| Susquehanna Water Gaps | | 1968 | 40.520918°N 76.978867°W | Cumberland, Dauphin, Perry | public/state | Millions of years of erosive rock create impressive landforms of unique geologic heritage and outstanding natural beauty, as the Susquehanna River cuts through five ridges of the Appalachian Mountains north of Harrisburg. |
| Tamarack Swamp | | 1977 | 41.989°N 79.555°W | Warren | public/state | An acidic kettle pond bog. |
| Tannersville Cranberry Bog | | 1974 | 41°2′24″N 75°18′21.6″W | Monroe | private/nonprofit | A 1,000-acre (405 ha) kettle lake fen. |
| John Heinz National Wildlife Refuge at Tinicum | | 1965 | 39.885866°N 75.262356°W | Philadelphia; Delaware | public/federal | Protects a tidal marsh of 350 acres (142 ha) located in an urban environment. |
| Tionesta Scenic and Research Natural Areas | | 1973 | 41.645°N 78.941°W | Warren; McKean | public/federal Allegheny National Forest | 4,131 acres (1,672 ha) of old growth forest on the Allegheny Plateau. |
| Titus and Wattsburg Bogs | | 1977 | 41.943388°N 79.763107°W | Erie | private/nonprofit | A peatland of 125 acres (51 ha) located near the shore of Lake Erie. |
| Wissahickon Valley | | 1964 | 40.016056°N 75.205744°W | Montgomery, Philadelphia | public/state Fort Washington State Park | Protects an urbanized tributary of the Schuylkill River, which features a gorge and thick woodlands. |

== See also ==
- List of National Historic Landmarks in Pennsylvania
