= Northwest Philadelphia =

Coordinates: 39.98343°N 75.18905°W

- Neighborhood of Philadelphia
- Wissahickon Valley Park in Northwest Philadelphia

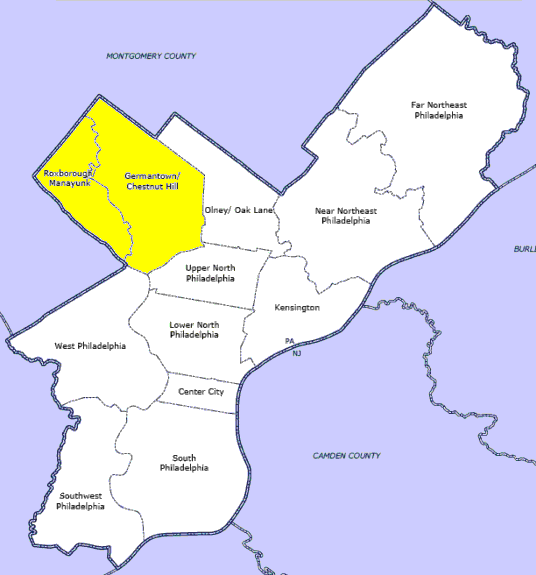
- Map of Philadelphia County with Northwest highlighted neighborhood. Click for larger image.
- Country: United States of America
- State: Pennsylvania
- County: Philadelphia
- City: Philadelphia

Population (2010)
  - Total: ~170,000~
- ZIP codes: 19118, 19119, 19127, 19128, 19129, 19138, 19144, 19150

Northwest Philadelphia is a section of the city of Philadelphia. The official boundary is Stenton Avenue to the north, the Schuylkill River to the southwest, Northwestern Avenue to the northwest, Roosevelt Boulevard to the south, and Wister Street and Stenton Avenue to the east. Conventionally, the area east of Wissahickon Creek, which comprises Germantown, Mount Airy, Chestnut Hill, and Cedarbrook, is termed the 'Upper Northwest', and the area west of the creek, which comprises Roxborough, Wissahickon, East Falls, and Manayunk, is termed the 'Lower Northwest'. The area of Philadelphia west of the Schuylkill River is known as West Philadelphia. The Philadelphia Police Department patrols two districts located within Northwest Philadelphia. The two patrol districts serving Northwest Philadelphia are the 5th and 14th districts.

== Demographics and culture ==
Northwest Philadelphia has substantial African American, Irish-American, Jewish-American, German-American, Italian-American, and British American (English American/Scottish American) populations, but its culture is varied, and only smaller neighborhoods within it can be said to be known for one ethnicity predominating. Between 1990 and 2010, the population of Northwest Philadelphia declined 8.6 percent. By 1990, African Americans accounted for slightly more than 50 percent of the area's population.

Compared with other sections of Philadelphia, a substantial portion of the Northwest retains a more suburban feel. In East Falls there are large Tudor homes and big modern ranch homes on sizable properties only blocks from more humble townhouses and rowhouses. Upper Roxborough has post-World War II suburban housing developments, while Lower Roxborough consists mostly of rowhouses and urban twin houses and apartments over storefronts. There are also blocks of large Victorian homes peppered among the rowhouses. In some places the buildings and street grid have existed for three centuries, other spots nearby were farmland until after World War II, and have infrastructure that is very recently developed, 18th-century farmhouses to 19th-century rowhouses to 20th-century shopping centers. From an enclave of working-class Germantown rowhouses and small single mansions to the wealthy estates of Chestnut Hill, both may have been built in the period of 1880-1920.

== Terrain and geography ==
Northwest Philadelphia is known for its hilly terrain, especially in the western half between the Wissahickon and the Schuylkill River. This hilly terrain is a distinct characteristic of Manayunk and Roxborough, making them popular for any recreation that can use a good hill (such as sledding and soapbox derbies, or especially challenging sessions of running and biking). Upper Roxborough, because it is one of the highest elevations in Philadelphia, is the site of a reservoir and many of the city's broadcast transmission towers. Ridge Avenue follows the ridge that divides the Wissahickon valley from the Schuylkill valley. Wissahickon Valley Park is located in Northwest Philadelphia.

Northwest Philadelphia's street grid is oriented along axes of northeast-southwest and northwest-southeast. These axes are skewed almost exactly 45° from the true north-south and east-west axes of Philadelphia's main street grid. The Wissahickon gorge divides the "halves" of Northwest Philadelphia because of the relative scarcity of road crossings. The rail lines tend to rather thoroughly divide adjacent neighborhoods, for the same reason. Manayunk's street grid evolved completely independently from Germantown's.
