= The Monastery (Philadelphia, Pennsylvania) =

Historic house in Pennsylvania, United States

- Monastery, The
- U.S. National Register of Historic Places
- Philadelphia Register of Historic Places
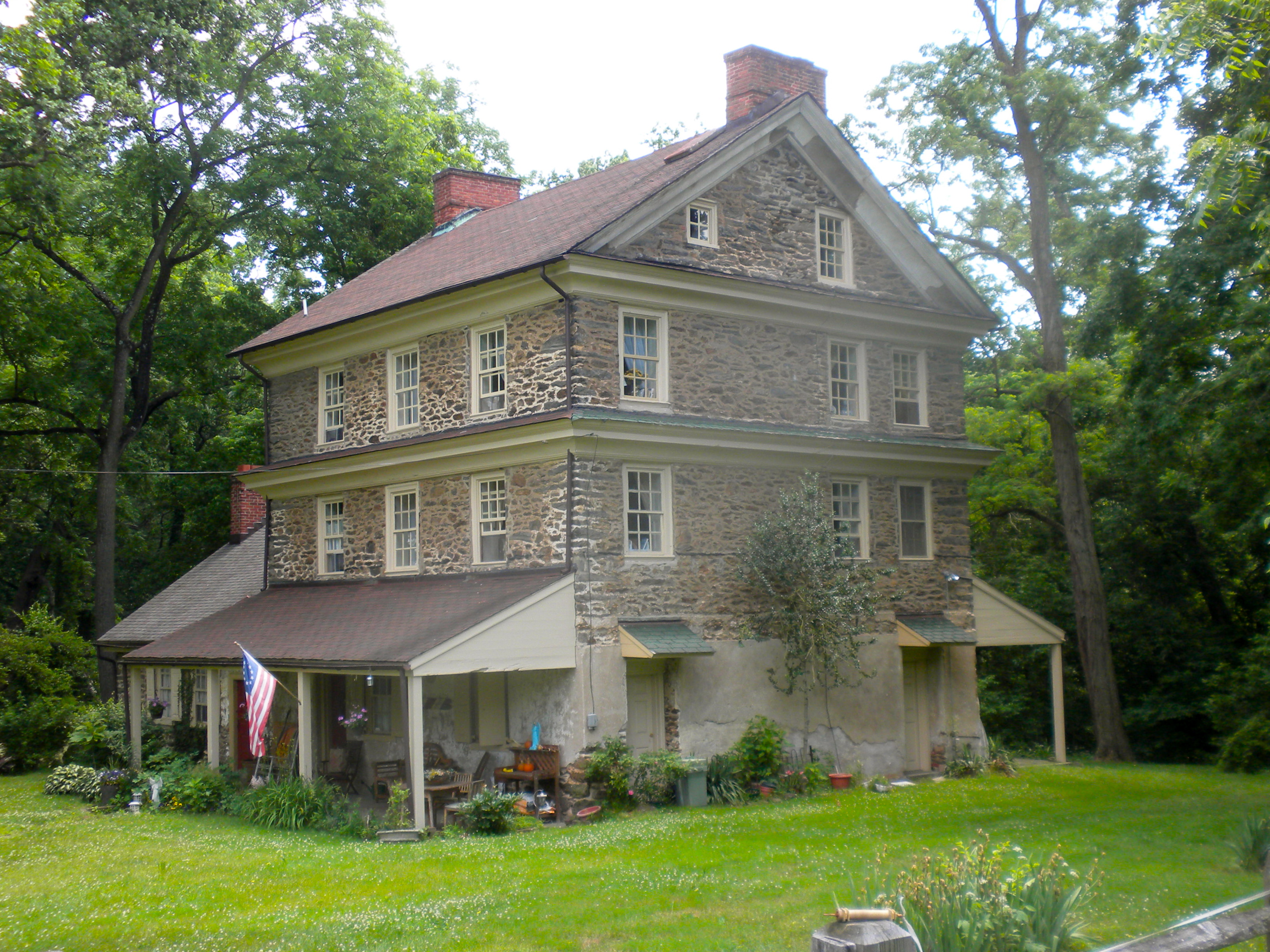

- Location within Philadelphia Location within Pennsylvania Location within the United States
- Location: Fairmount Park, Kitchen's Lane at Wissahickon Creek, Philadelphia, Pennsylvania
- Coordinates: 40°2′10″N 75°12′13″W
- Area: less than one acre
- Built: 1747
- NRHP reference No.: 72001164
- Added to NRHP: March 16, 1972

The Monastery is a historic stone house in Philadelphia, located on Wissahickon Creek at Kitchens Lane.

It was built in 1747 and added to the National Register of Historic Places in 1972. The house's connection to monastic life is uncertain or simply legendary, but German mystic and hermit Johannes Kelpius lived nearby in the Wissahickon Valley from 1694 until his death in 1708, and connections with monks from Ephrata have been reported. According to the History of Philadelphia (1884):

...there is a recital in the deed that Joseph [Gorgas] had since (1747) erected at his own cost and charges "a three-story stone house or messuage on a certain piece or spot of land." Joseph Gorgas was a member of the society of Seventh Day Baptists. It is conjectured that he erected this house for purposes of seclusion and meditation. It is said, "Hither were gathered congenial spirits like himself, and there they held sweet communion." A small strip of land below the county bridge is pointed out as the place where the monks were accustomed to administer the rite of baptism in the Wissahickon, and on the early township map the spot is designated as the Baptisterion. Joseph Gorgas sold the lot with the house, now called the "Monastery," to Edward Milner in 1761, and it has since gone through various hands. The house in which the unknown author of the "Chronicon" lived for seventeen months could not have been the stone mansion to which tradition affixes the title. There is no proof that Gorgas allowed his house to be used for monastic purposes, but novelists have made much of the legends and tales of hermits and monks that cluster thickly about the vicinity.

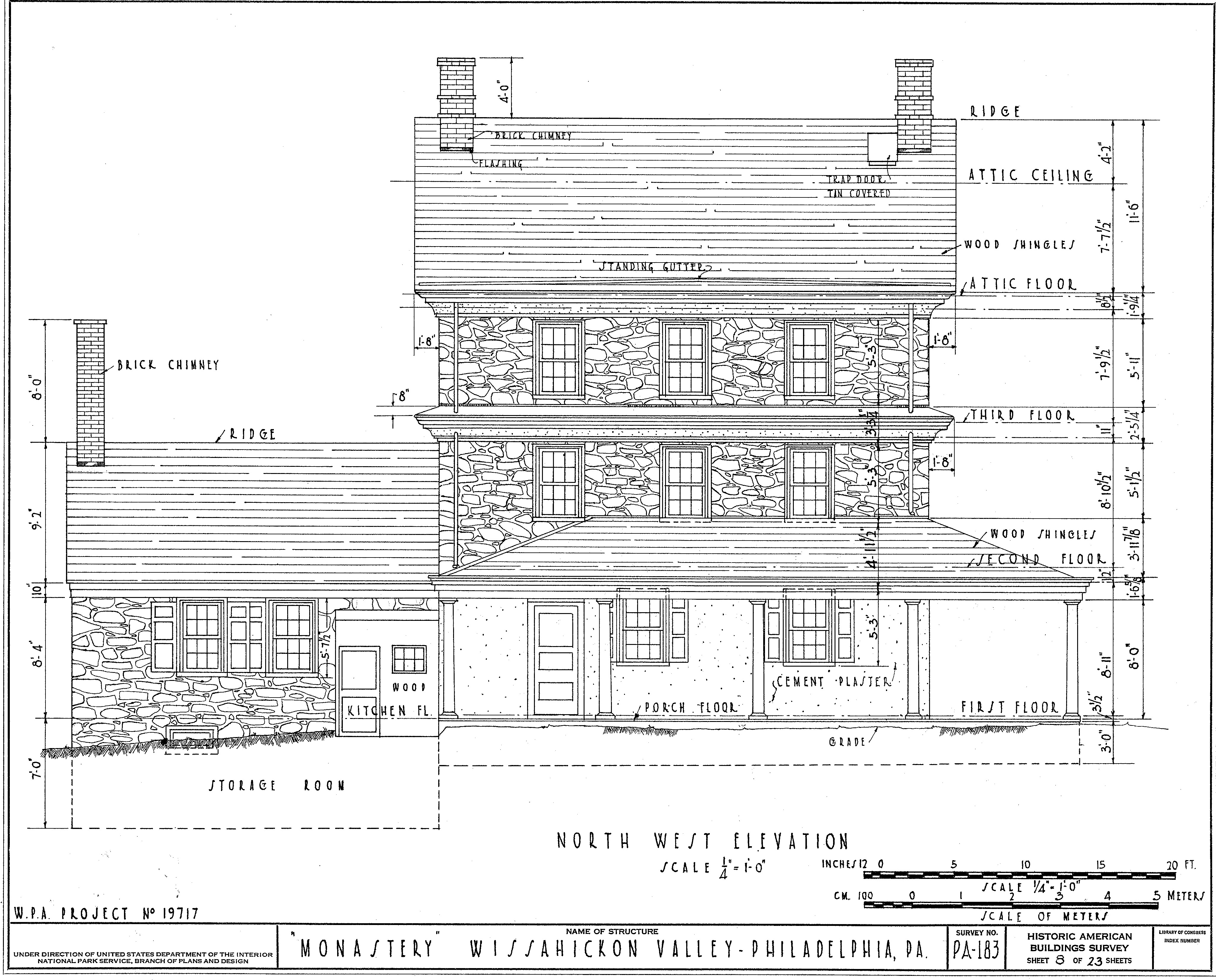
Front view as drawn by HABS

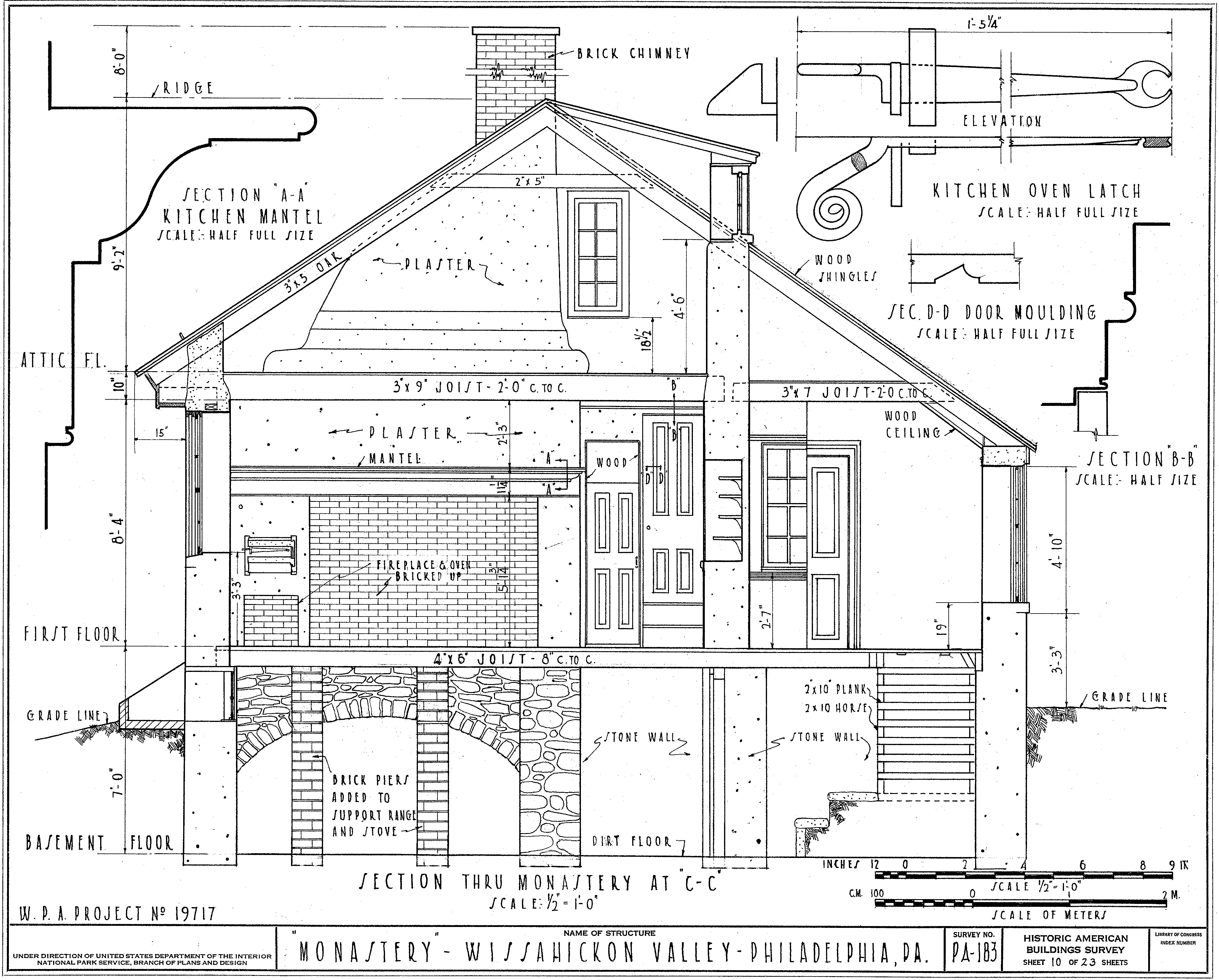
Side view as drawn by HABS

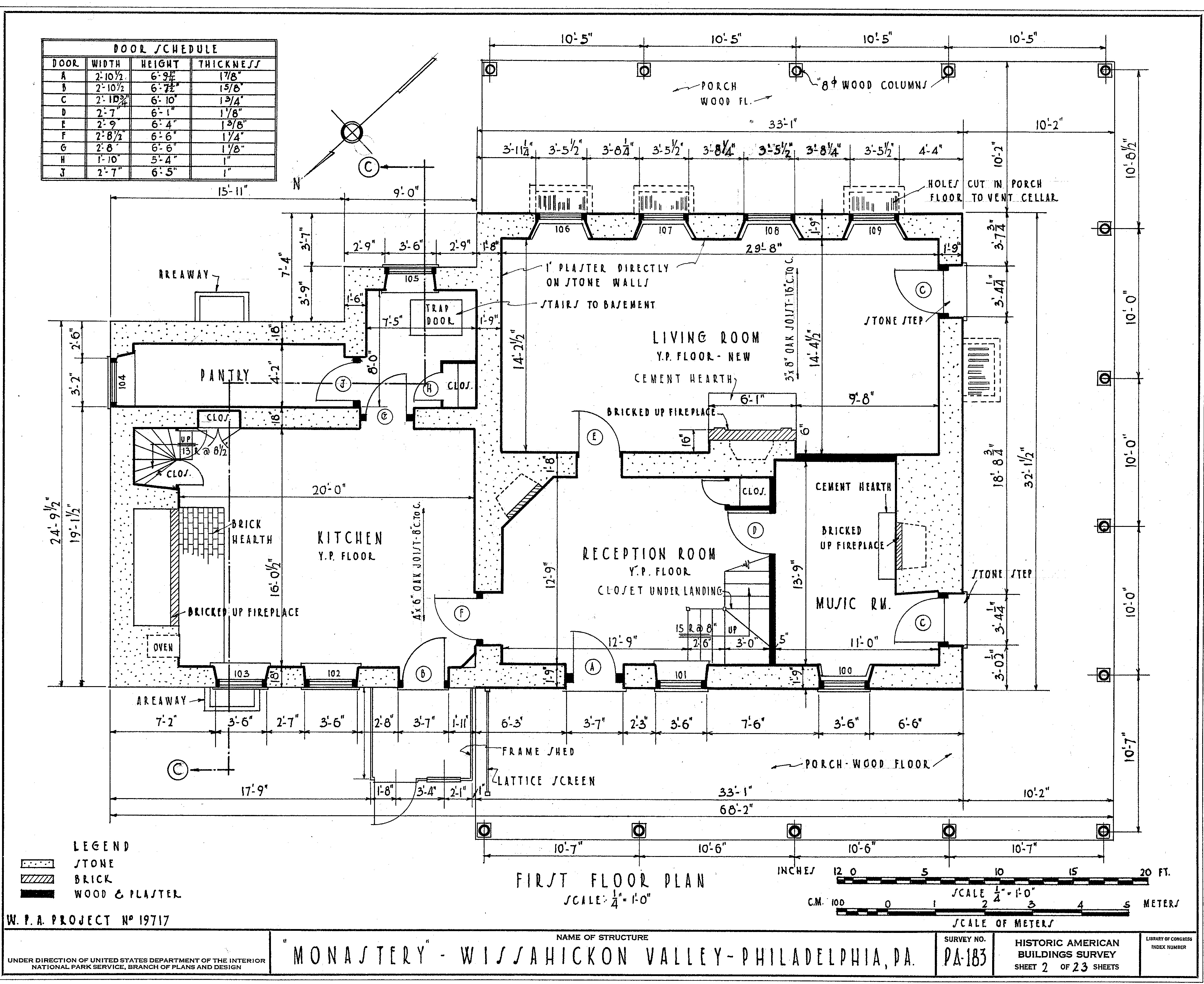
First floor plan by HABS

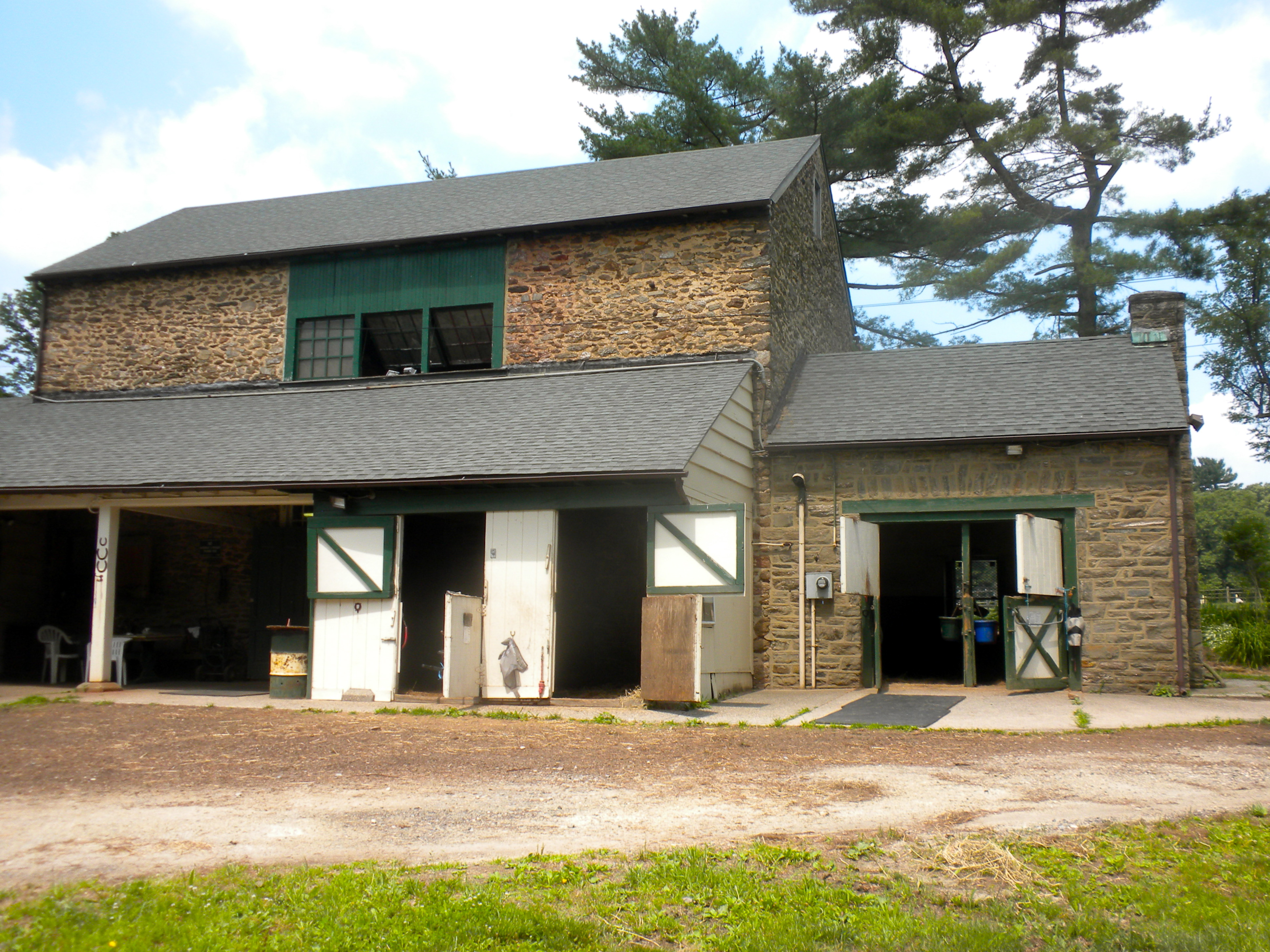
Stable on the grounds
