= John L. Kinsey School =

- U.S. National Register of Historic Places
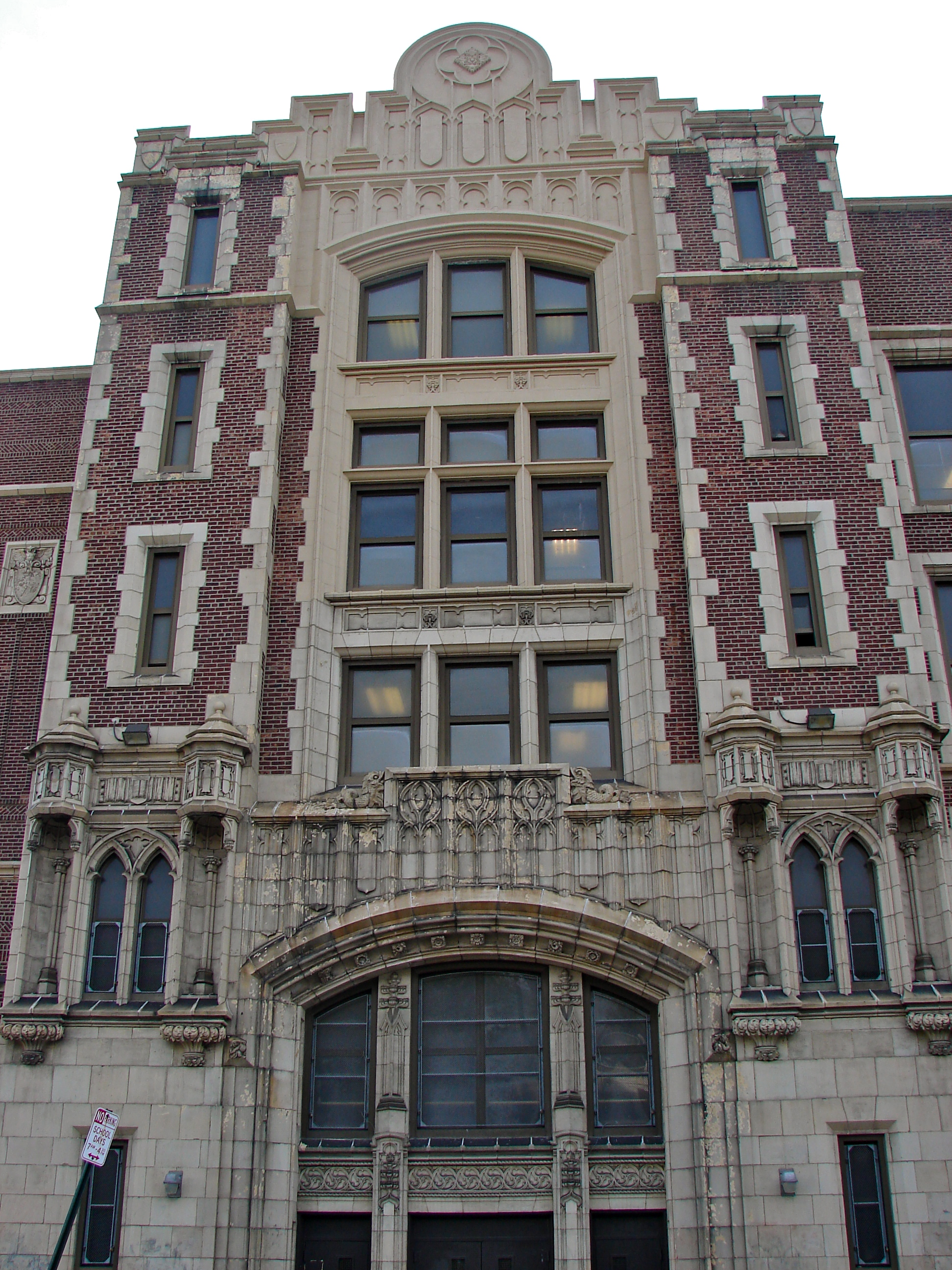
- John L. Kinsey School, September 2010

- Location within Philadelphia Location within Pennsylvania Location within the United States
- Location: 6501 Limekiln Pike, Philadelphia, Pennsylvania
- Coordinates: 40°03′13″N 75°09′09″W
- Area: 3 acres (1.2 ha)
- Built: 1915–1916
- Built by: Cramp & Co.
- Architect: Richards, Henry deCoursey
- Architectural style: Late Gothic Revival, Academic Gothic
- MPS: Philadelphia Public Schools TR
- NRHP reference No.: 86003297
- Added to NRHP: December 4, 1986

The John L. Kinsey School is a former K-8 school that is located in the West Oak Lane neighborhood of Philadelphia, Pennsylvania. It was a part of the School District of Philadelphia.

It was added to the National Register of Historic Places in 1986.

As of 2017, the school building is now home to Building 21, a public high school in the innovative school district network.

== History ==
It was designed by Henry deCoursey Richards and built by Cramp & Co. in 1915–1916. It is a four-story, seven bay reinforced concrete and brick building on a raised basement in Late Gothic Revival-style. It features a projecting entrance bay and limestone and terra cotta decorative details.

The district closed Kinsey in 2013. The possible options for students after the closure were Rowen Elementary School, Prince Hall Elementary School, Pastorius Elementary School, Pennell Elementary School, and Gen. Louis Wagner Middle School.

== Feeder patterns ==
Kinsey students were zoned to King High School.
