= Chestnut Hill Historic District (Philadelphia) =

Historic district in Pennsylvania, United States

- U.S. National Register of Historic Places
- U.S. Historic district
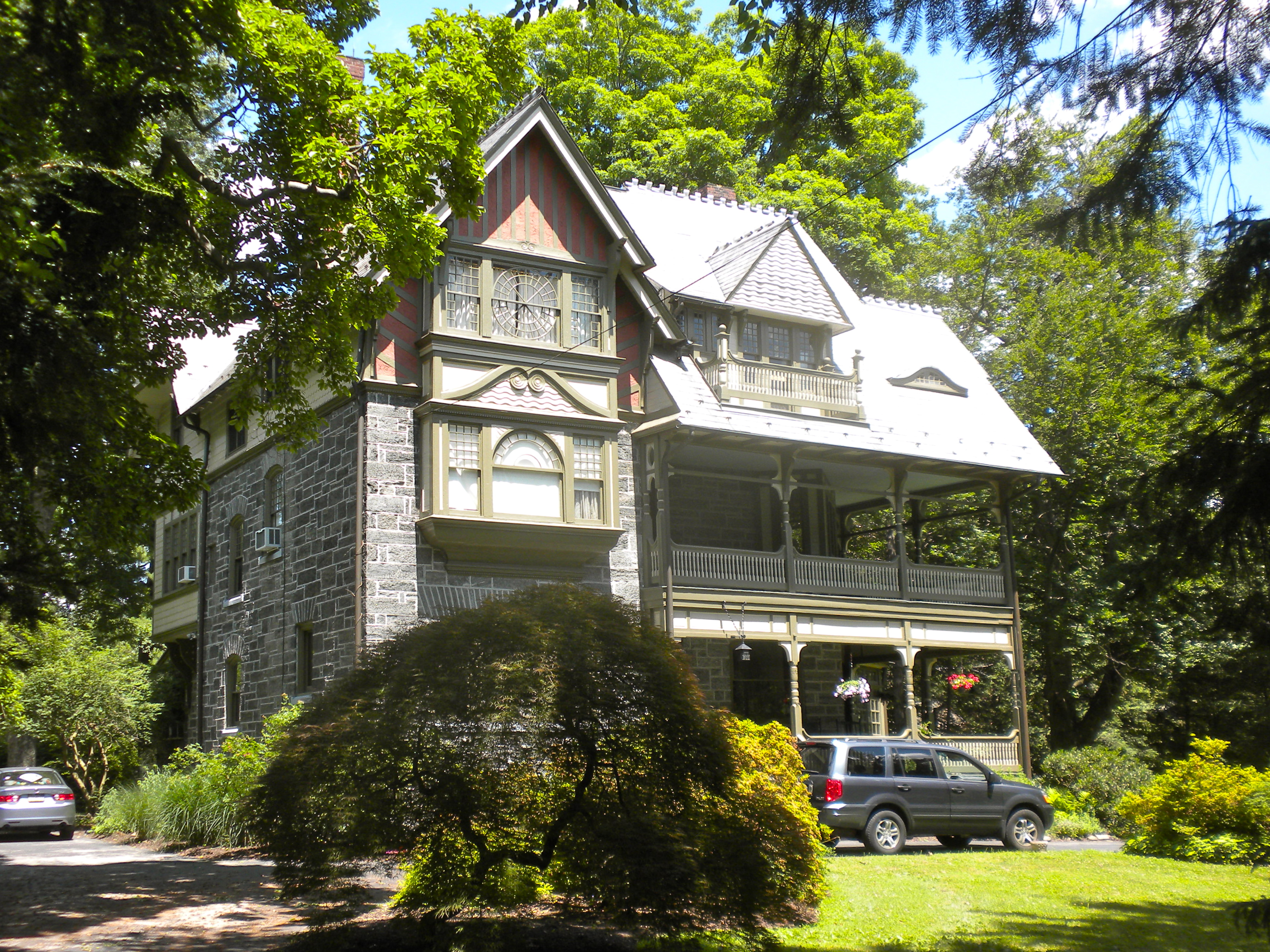
- Houston-Sauveur House (1885), 8205 Seminole Avenue.

- Location within Philadelphia Location within Pennsylvania Location within the United States
- Location: Roughly bounded by Fairmount Park and Montgomery Co. Line, Philadelphia, Pennsylvania
- Coordinates: 40°4′18″N 75°12′47″W
- Area: 1,920 acres (780 ha)
- Architect: Multiple
- Architectural style: Mid 19th Century Revival, Early Republic, Late Victorian
- NRHP reference No.: 85001334
- Added to NRHP: June 20, 1985

The Chestnut Hill Historic District is a historic area covering all the Chestnut Hill section of Philadelphia, Pennsylvania.

It was added to the National Register of Historic Places as a historic district in 1985.

== Contributing properties ==
The historic district comprises 1,987 contributing properties over 1,920 acres, including:

- The Anglecot (designed by Wilson Eyre)
- Druim Moir Historic District, includes Romanesque Revival mansion (1883–1886), designed by G. W. & W. D. Hewitt
- Graver's Lane Station (1883), designed by Frank Furness
- John Story Jenks School (1922), designed by Irwin T. Catharine
- Thomas Mill Covered Bridge (across the Wissahickon Creek, the only traditional covered bridge in Philadelphia)
- Wissahickon Inn (now Chestnut Hill Academy) (1883–1884), designed by G. W. & W. D. Hewitt
- Inglewood Cottage (1850), designed by Thomas Ustick Walter
- The former site of Boxly, the estate of Frederick Winslow Taylor, where Taylor often received the business-management pilgrims who came to meet the "Father of Scientific Management"
- Esherick House (1961), designed by Louis Kahn
- Vanna Venturi House (1962–1964), designed by Robert Venturi
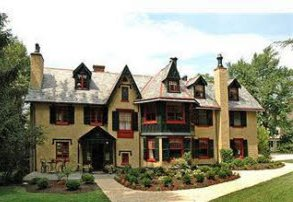
Inglewood Cottage

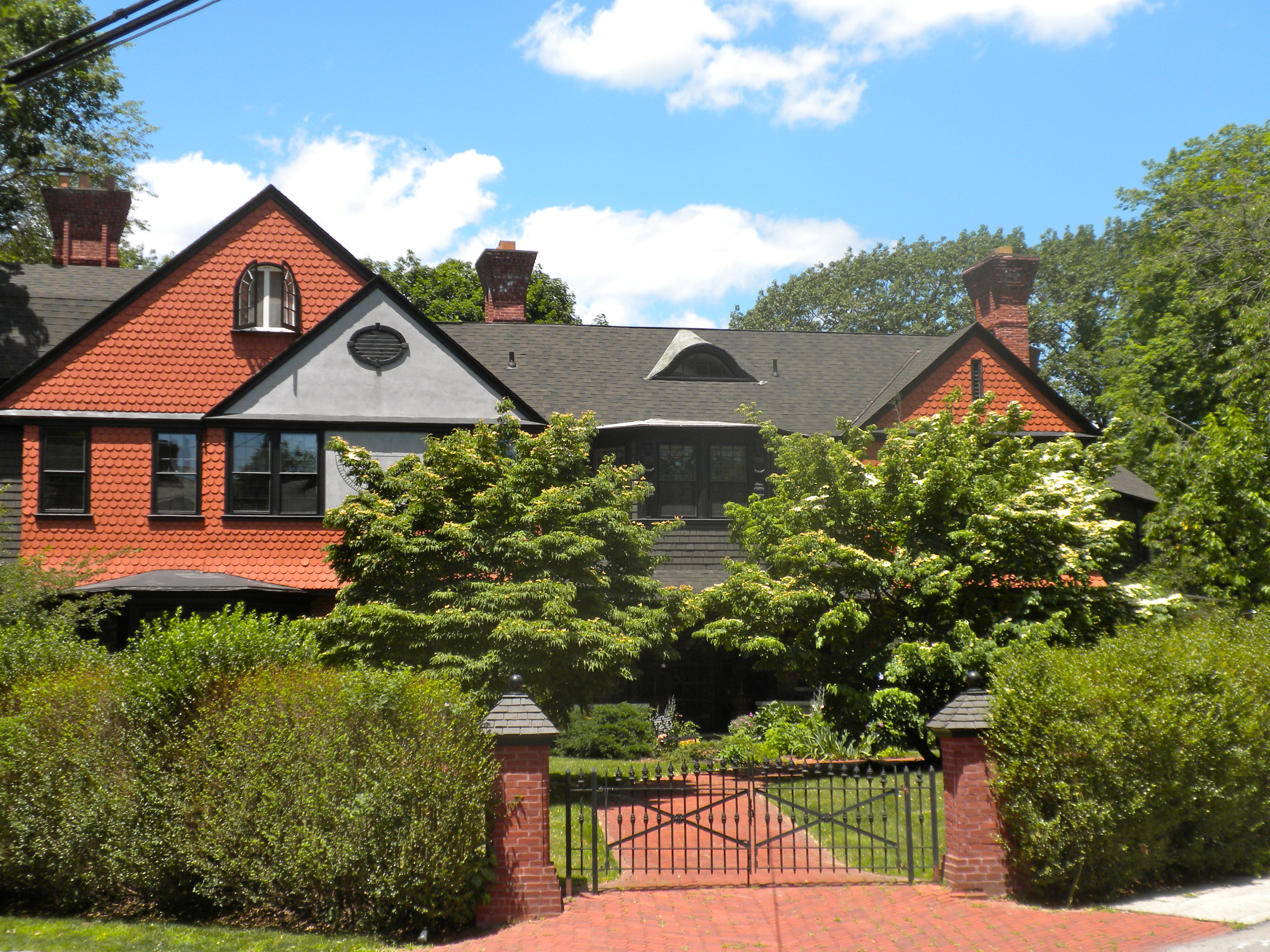
The Anglecot

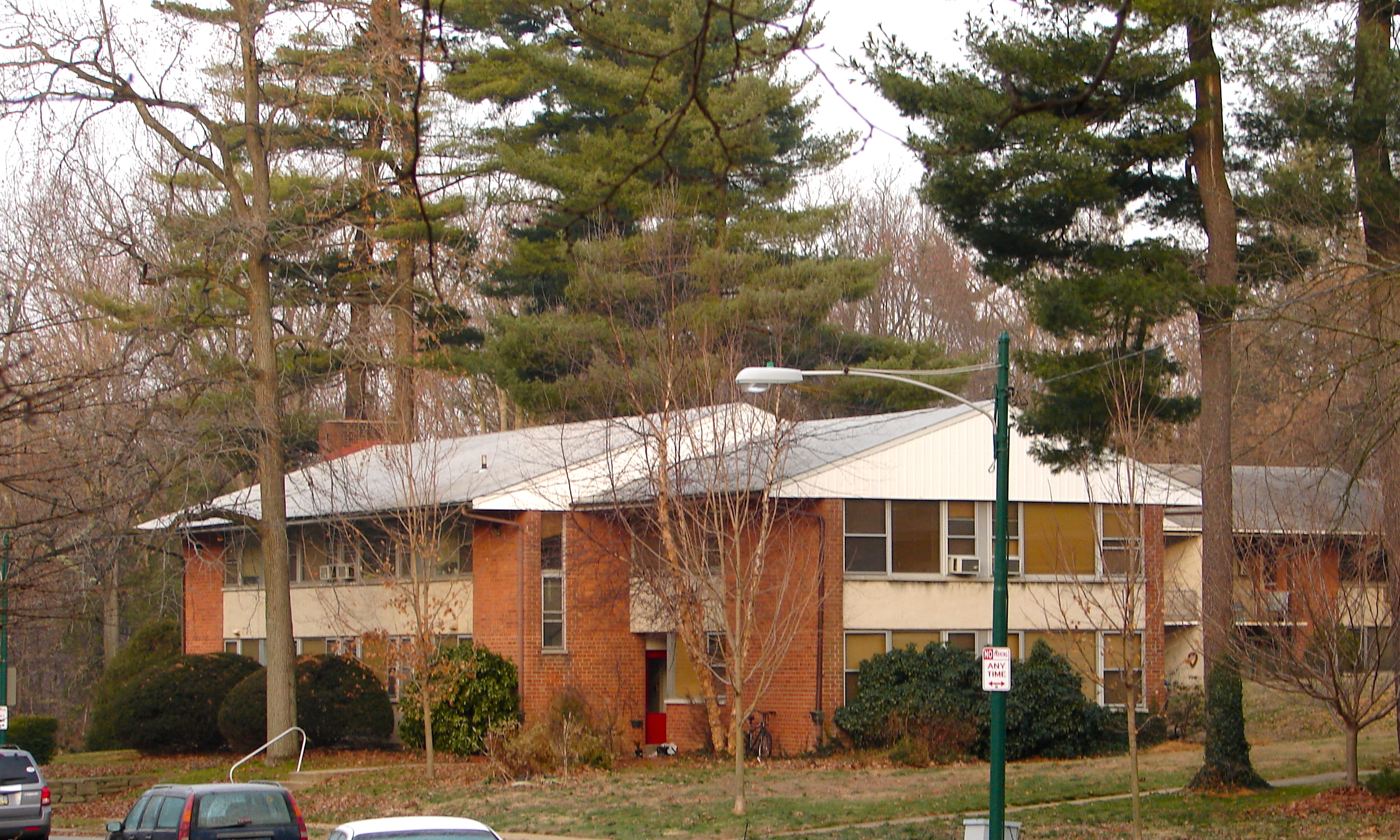
Cherokee Village Apartments

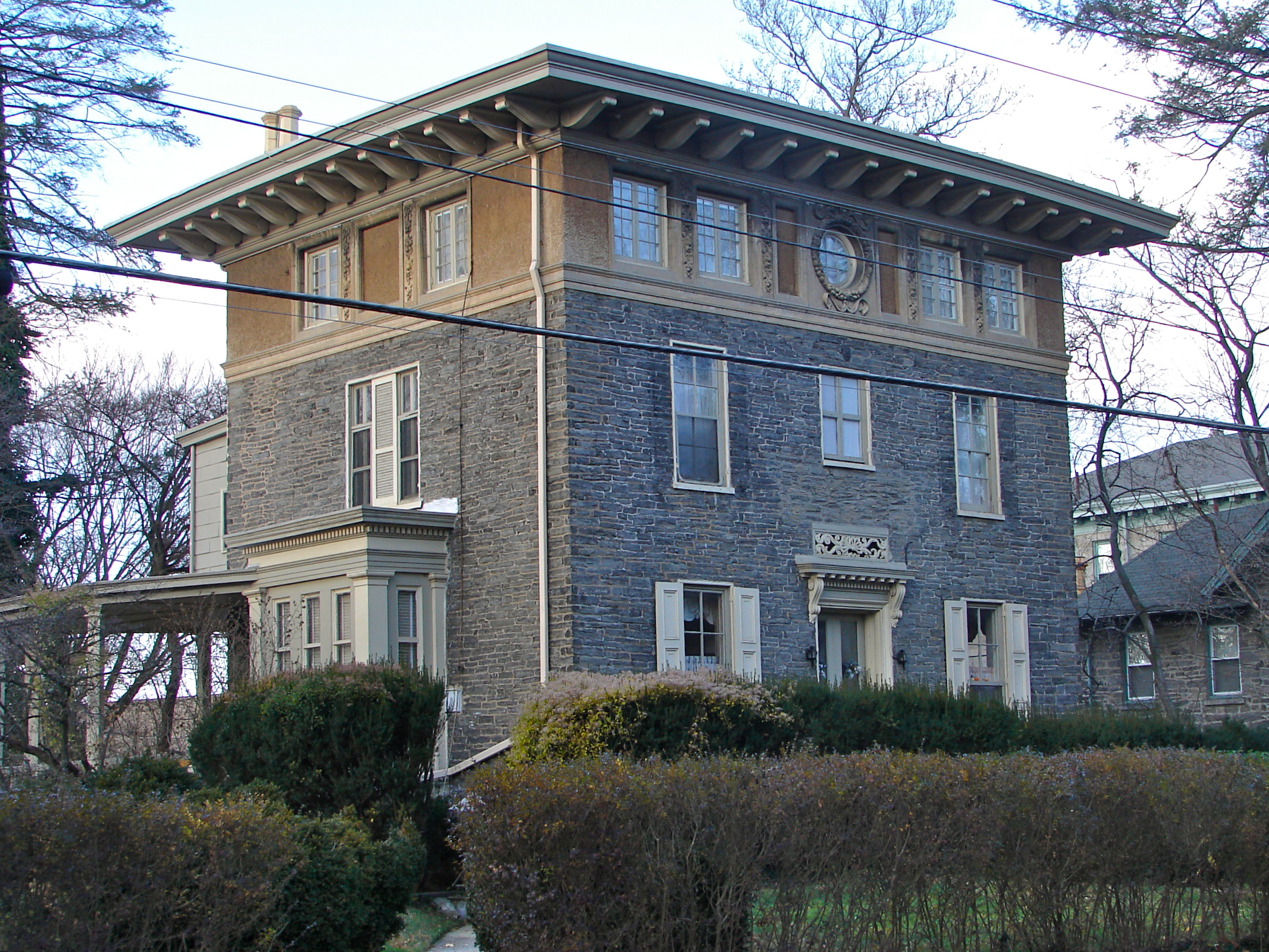
Sam Austin House

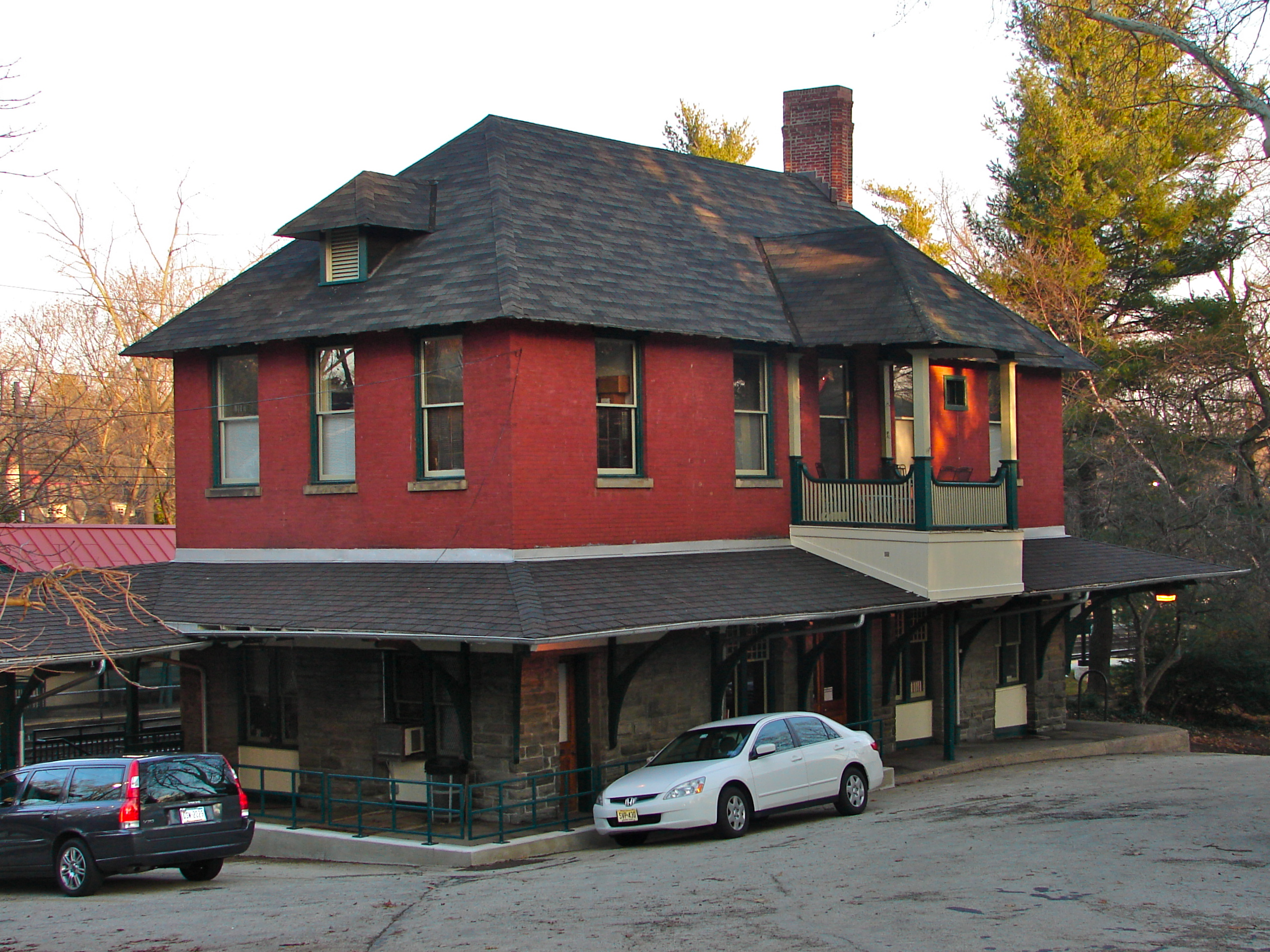
St. Martins SEPTA station

== See also ==
- Awbury Historic District
- Colonial Germantown Historic District
- RittenhouseTown Historic District
- Tulpehocken Station Historic District
