= Germantown High School (Philadelphia) =

Secondary school located in Philadelphia, Pennsylvania

Coordinates: 40.040°N 75.176°W

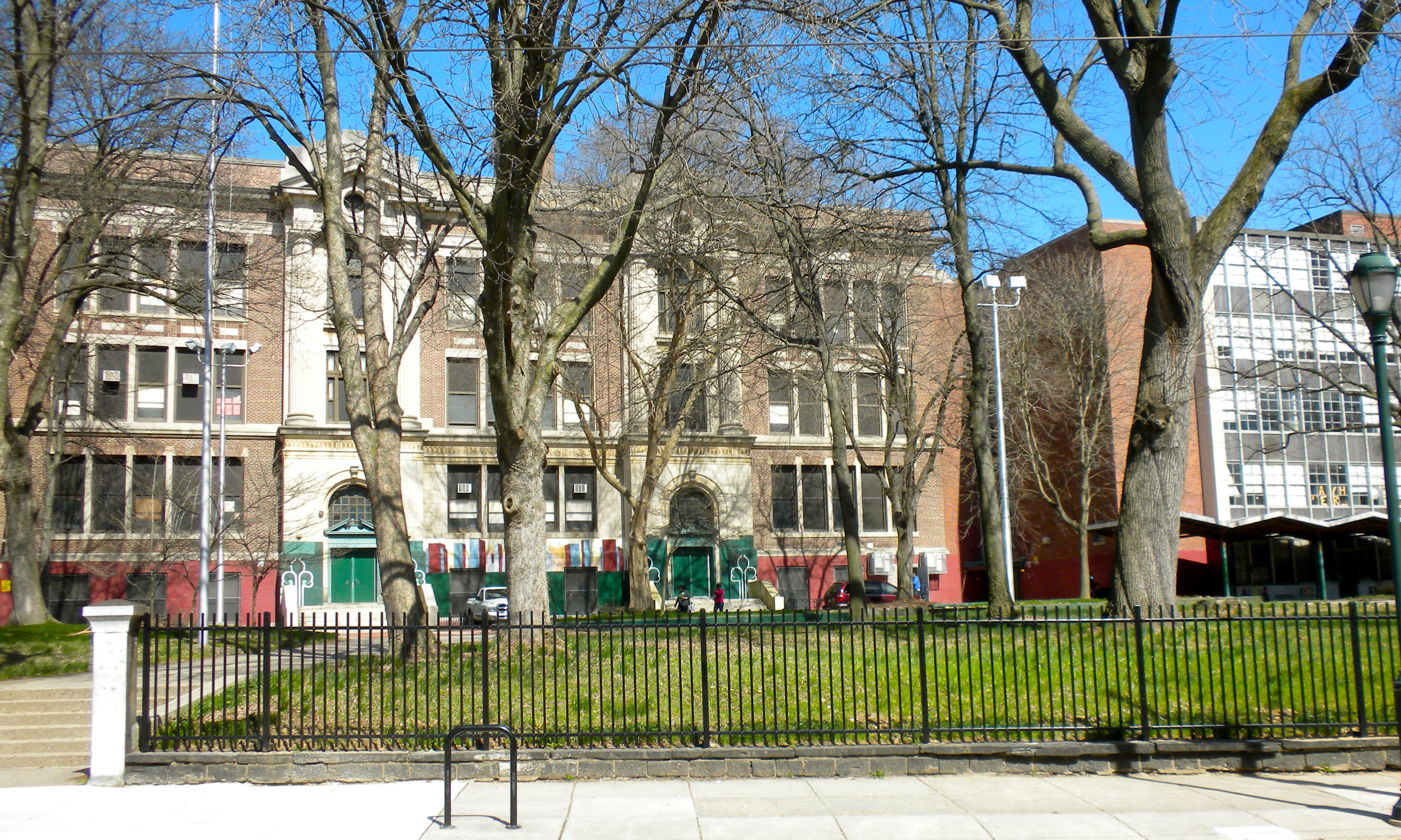

Information
- Established: 1914
- Closed: 2013
- Grades: 9-12 (1914-1972); 11-12 (1972-?); 9-12 (?-2013)
- Enrollment: 676 (2013)

Germantown High School was a secondary school in Philadelphia, Pennsylvania. Germantown High School graduated its final class on June 19, 2013 and closed its doors that week.

GHS, located in Germantown, was a part of the School District of Philadelphia. The school was built in 1914. Its students were mostly African-American, despite the previous German population of the region. Students came from the Logan, Germantown, Mt. Airy, Chestnut Hill, and Nicetown-Tioga sections of the city.

The team name was the Bears. In 1993-94 and 1995, the school's boys varsity basketball team was ranked first in Philadelphia.

== History ==
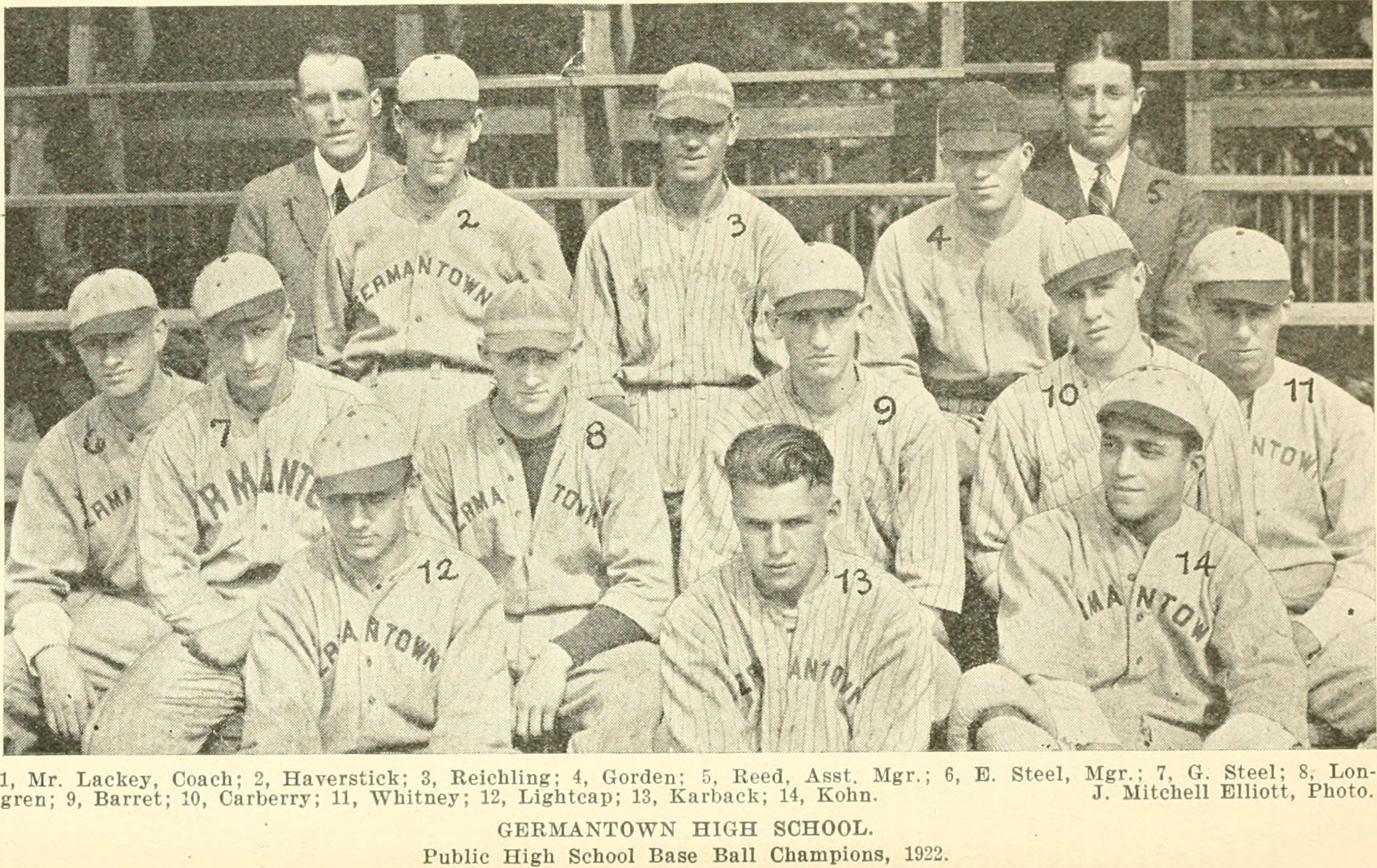
The 1922 Germantown High School baseball team

Germantown High became a grade 11-12 school after Martin Luther King High School, housing grades 9-10, opened on February 8, 1972. The school district used this arrangement since it intended to keep students in Northwest Philadelphia economically integrated. Some neighborhoods in proximity to King, such as East Mount Airy and West Oak Lane, wanted King to become a 9-12 school because Germantown High was located in proximity to poorer areas.

Germantown and King ultimately became separate 9-12 schools. The campuses are about 1 mile (1.6 km) apart.

Germantown High's peak student population was over 3,000. The enrollment declined due to the availability of magnet schools and charter schools. Prior to the school's 2013 closure, an entire wing had been blocked off and there were 676 students. In 2013 the students from Germantown were transferred to King.

In April 2019, the Germantown United CDC and the Keeping Society of Philadelphia filed a nomination authored by Oscar Beisert, Architectural Historian and Historic Preservationist, to list the building in the Philadelphia Register of Historic Places.

At its 691st Stated Meeting on March 13, 2020, the Philadelphia Historical Commission voted unanimously to designate the building and its grounds, a status which comes with protection from alteration and demolition, and regulatory authority over any future redevelopment of the property.

== Demographics ==
In 2013, the school had 676 students, mostly low income and African-American. Students in foster care and homeless students made up at least 10% of that student body.

== Academic performance ==
In 2013, the school's graduation rate was below 50%, 18% of students had proficiency in reading, and 15% had proficiency in mathematics.

== Athletics ==
American football players had to ride a bus to sports practice because Germantown High did not have an on-campus athletic field. King and Germantown were previously athletic rivals, but after 2013 American football team players of Germantown High joined King's team.

== Feeder patterns ==
Feeder middle schools into Germantown included Roosevelt Middle School. K-8 feeder schools into Germantown included Charles W. Henry School, Henry H. Houston School, John S. Jenks School, and Anna L. Lingelbach School. Students zoned to Henry, Houston, Jenks, and Lingelbach are now zoned to Roxborough High School. Students zoned to Roosevelt are now zoned to King High School.

== Alumni ==
- Linda Addison, maiden name Webster, multi-award winning author/poet 1970
- Belinda C. Anderson (born 1954), academic administrator
- Frankie Beverly, singer
- Carlos Bradley, NFL football player
- Steve Coleman, football player
- William Thaddeus Coleman Jr., 4th US Secretary of Transportation, and 2nd African American to serve in the US Cabinet.
- Bill Cosby, comedian, actor
- Linda Creed, American songwriter
- Bill Fleischman, sports journalist and professor
- Herman Frazier, Olympic Gold and Silver Medalist 1976
- Sam Greenblatt, CTO of HP, Dell
- Rick Lackman, football player
- Alfred Leopold Luongo, federal Judge
- Randy Owens (1959–2015), basketball player
- Will Parks, NFL player, Miami Dolphins
- Victor Potamkin, businessman and car dealership owner
- Frank K. Richardson, judge
- Mark Segal, journalist
- Archie Shepp, jazz saxophonist
- Mike Sojourner, basketball player, 10th overall pick of 1974 NBA draft
- Tammi Terrell, Motown singer
- The Showstoppers

== Faculty ==
- Anna Mullikin (1893–1975), PhD math teacher (1923–1959) and head of the math department
