= West Oak Lane, Philadelphia =

West Oak Lane
- Neighborhood of Philadelphia
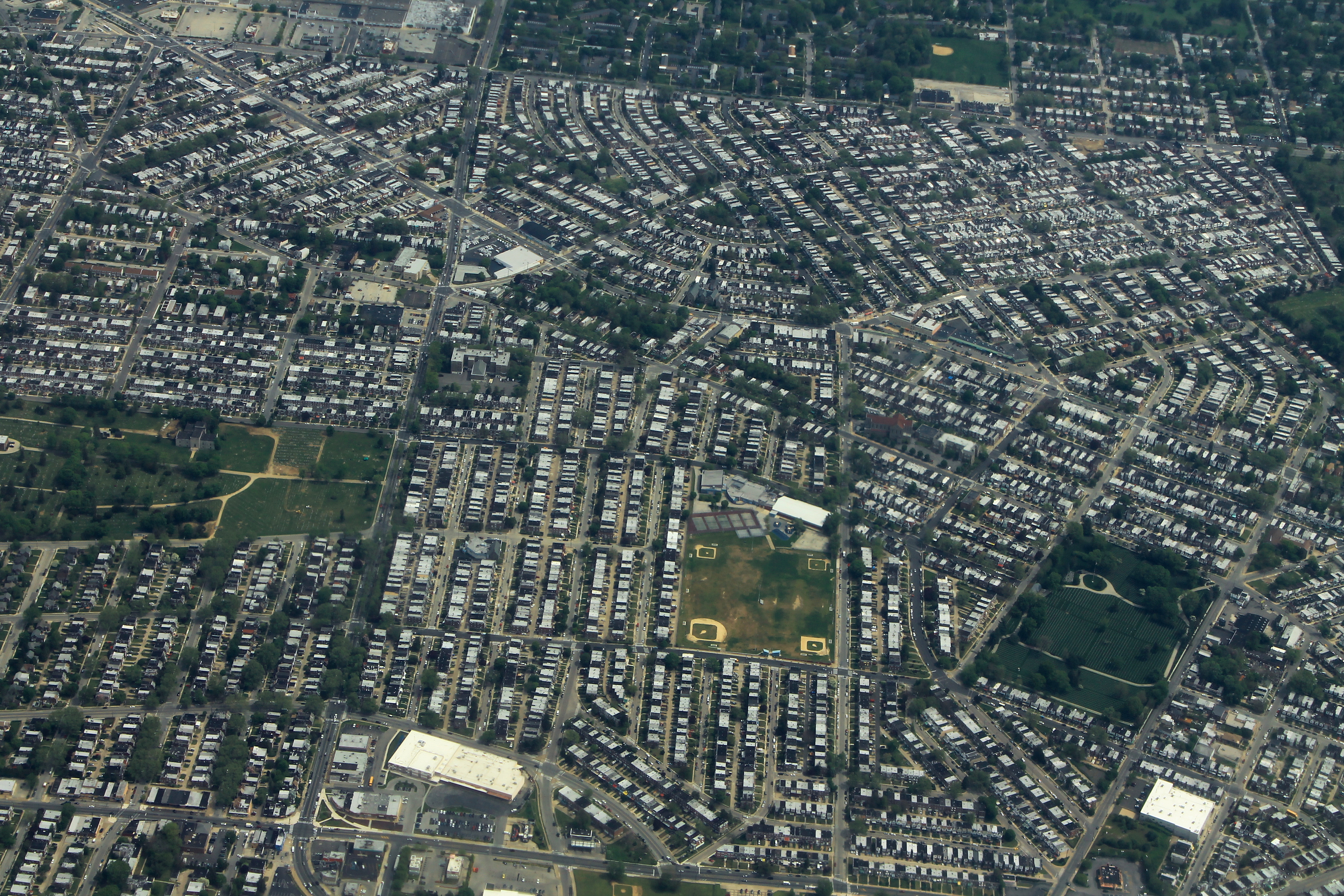
- Aerial view of West Oak Lane

- Location within Philadelphia
- Country: United States
- State: Pennsylvania
- County: Philadelphia
- City: Philadelphia
- Area codes: 215, 267 and 445

In the mid-1800s, Joseph Wharton, founder of the Wharton School at the University of Pennsylvania and co-founder of Bethlehem Steel, owned much of West Oak Lane. Although it was predominantly Caucasian from its inception until the mid-1960s, West Oak Lane is now one of Philadelphia's middle-class African American communities.

The neighborhood has distinct architecture that separates it from surrounding neighborhoods. Along with larger and sometimes detached houses, West Oak Lane has many tree-lined streets and small yards. In 2005, the 19126 and 19138 ZIP Codes, which contain West Oak Lane, had a median home sale price of $113,200. This was a 34-percent increase over the median price in 2004. The median home sale price as of April 2015 was $122,941, which was a 1.2% percent increase from the previous year.

== Boundaries ==
- Bounded by Cheltenham Avenue (beyond lay Cheltenham Township, Montgomery County, Pennsylvania)
- Bounded by Broad Street (beyond lay East Oak Lane, Philadelphia)
- Bounded by Washington Lane (beyond lay Cedarbrook, Philadelphia/Stenton)
- Bounded by Stenton Avenue; portion west of Wister Street (beyond lay East Germantown, Philadelphia)
- Bounded by Stenton Avenue; portion east of Wister Street (beyond lay Ogontz, Philadelphia/Belfield)
- West Oak Lane shares the 19138 zipcode with Ogontz, Philadelphia/Belfield and the eastern portion of Germantown, Philadelphia (between Chew & Stenton Avenues).

The 19126 Zip Code is shared with East Oak Lane, Philadelphia.

== Education ==
School District of Philadelphia operates public schools.

The Samuel W. Pennypacker School, William Rowen School and Gen. Louis Wagner Junior High School are listed on the National Register of Historic Places. Hope Charter School, Prince Hall Elementary School and West Oak Lane Charter School are also located in the area.

The district closed John L. Kinsey School, also on the historic register, in 2013.

Students zoned to Wagner are zoned to Martin Luther King High School.

La Salle University's campus extends on the border of West Oak Lane, Ogontz, and Germantown. on Olney and Wister.

== Other sites ==
Philadelphia National Cemetery and Ogontz Hall are on the NRHP. Erny Field is a baseball field that has hosted the Temple University baseball team, the Arcadia University baseball team, and the city's high school Public League and Catholic League baseball championships.

== Transportation ==
SEPTA's Route 6, once known as the Ogontz Avenue Line, is a former streetcar line and current bus route operated by the Southeastern Pennsylvania Transportation Authority (SEPTA). This was once a popular trolley line to Willow Grove Amusement Park (current location of the Willow Grove Park Mall). Buses replaced trolleys north of Cheltenham Avenue to Willow Grove on June 8, 1958. SEPTA voted to close the Route 6 trolley line on October 23, 1985. Route 6 was converted to bus operations on January 12, 1986. It currently serves the Olney Transportation Center to the south and the Cheltenham and Ogontz Loop (across from the Cheltenham Square Mall) to the north along Cheltenham Avenue. Routes 16 (once the Cheltenham portion of SEPTA's Route C), 22, 80 Express, H, and XH also serve the loop and the area. To the southernmost tip of the neighborhood, Routes K and 55 converge at the intersection of Old York Road, Broad Street, and 66th Avenue.

== Shopping ==
Many stores are on Stenton and Ogontz Avenues. Ogontz Avenue runs generally north, then northwest, as the spine of the neighborhood and the main business strip. Cheltenham Mall is at the end of Ogontz Avenue; the Cedarbrook Plaza mall is only five minutes away by car or bus.

== Demographics ==
According to Citydata.com in 2013, there were 42,390 people living in the area, with a population density of 24,517 people per square mile. The average household income was $41,275, and the average amount of rent paid per month was $708. There were 18,298 males and 24,626 females. The median age for males was 36.6 years, and the median age for females was 43.0 years. The average household had 2.8 people, and 27.1% of households were married couple families. 24.7% of households were single mother households. 26.9% of residents 15 and older had never been married at all. 6.2% of people living in the area were born in a foreign country.

The neighborhood has a lower income than 62.8% of neighborhoods in the US. 11.5% of children living in the area live in poverty, which is lower than 62.8% of neighborhoods in the country. In addition, 31.4% of the population works in executive, management, and professional occupations; 28.2% work service jobs, 22.9% have clerical, assistant, and tech support occupations, and 17.9% have jobs in manufacturing and laborer occupations.
