= Steve Coleman (American football) =

American football player (born 1950)

No. 76
- Position: Defensive end

Personal information
- Born: August 8, 1950 (age 76); Philadelphia, Pennsylvania, U.S.
- Listed height: 6 ft 5 in (1.96 m)
- Listed weight: 252 lb (114 kg)

Career information
- High school: Germantown (Philadelphia)
- College: Delaware State (1970–1973)
- NFL draft: 1974: undrafted

Career history
- Houston Oilers (1974)*; Denver Broncos (1974)
- * Offseason or practice squad member only
- Stats at Pro Football Reference

Steven Coleman (born August 8, 1950) is an American former professional football defensive end who played one season with the Denver Broncos of the National Football League (NFL). He played college football at Delaware State University.

== Early life and college ==
Steven Coleman was born on August 8, 1950, in Philadelphia, Pennsylvania. He attended Germantown High School in Philadelphia.

He was a member of the Delaware State Hornets football team from 1970 to 1973. The 1973 Hornets had an 0–11 record during Coleman's senior year.

== Professional career ==
Colemam signed with the Houston Oilers after going undrafted in the 1974 NFL draft but was later released.

He then signed with the Denver Broncos and played in two games for the team during the 1974 season. He became a free agent in May 1975 and re-signed with the Broncos on July 15. He was released on September 9, 1975. He stood 6'5" tall, weighed 252 pounds, and was listed as a defensive end during his pro career.
