= Charles S. Parmenter =

American chemist (1933–2025)

- Born: Charles Stedman Parmenter; October 12, 1933; Chestnut Hill, Philadelphia, U.S.
- Died: January 26, 2025 (aged 91); Bloomington, Indiana, U.S.
- Education: University of Pennsylvania; University of Rochester
- Occupation: Chemist

Charles Stedman Parmenter (October 12, 1933 – January 26, 2025) was an American chemist.

== Life and career ==
Parmenter was born in Chestnut Hill, Philadelphia, the son of Charles Leroy Parmenter and Hazeltene Stedman. He attended the University of Pennsylvania, earning his Bachelor of Arts degree in chemistry in 1955. After earning his degree, he served as a second lieutenant in the United States Air Force, which after his discharge, he attended the University of Rochester, earning his PhD degree in physical chemistry in 1963.

Parmenter served as a professor in the department of chemistry at Indiana University Bloomington from 1972 to 2008. During his years as a professor, in 1988, he was named a distinguished professor, and was elected as a member of the National Academy of Sciences in 1995.

== Death ==
Parmenter died on January 26, 2025, in Bloomington, Indiana, at the age of 91.
