= Samuel W. Pennypacker School =

- U.S. National Register of Historic Places
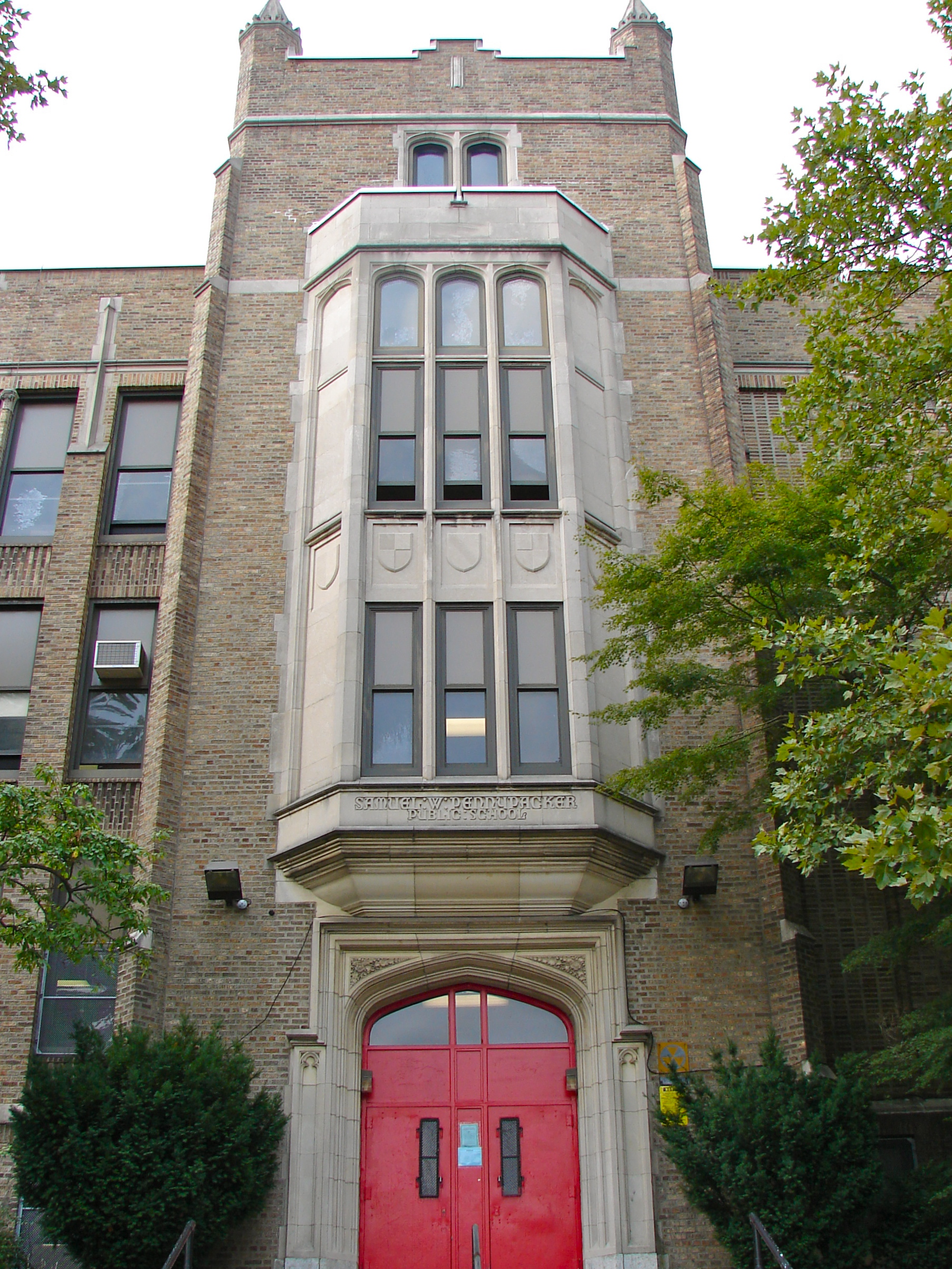
- Samuel W. Pennypacker School, September 2010

- Location within Philadelphia Location within Pennsylvania Location within the United States
- Location: 1858 E. Washington Ln., Philadelphia, Pennsylvania
- Coordinates: 40°3′54″N 75°9′34″W
- Area: 3.8 acres (1.5 ha)
- Built: 1929-1930
- Architect: Irwin T. Catharine
- Architectural style: Late Gothic Revival
- MPS: Philadelphia Public Schools TR
- NRHP reference No.: 88002314
- Added to NRHP: November 18, 1988

The Samuel W. Pennypacker School is a historic American elementary school in the West Oak Lane neighborhood of Philadelphia, Pennsylvania. It is part of the School District of Philadelphia.

It was added to the National Register of Historic Places in 1988.

== History and architectural features ==
Designed by Irwin T. Catharine, this historic structure was built between 1929 and 1930. A three-story, eight-bay, brick building that sits on a raised basement, it was created in a Late Gothic Revival style and features brick piers with terra cotta capitals, a projecting stone two-story bay, and four small towers at each corner. It was named for Pennsylvania Governor Samuel W. Pennypacker (1843-1916).

== Feeder patterns ==
Pennypacker feeds into King High School.
