= Rick Lackman =

American football player (1910–1990)

- Lackman with the Philadelphia Eagles

No. 15, 24
- Position: Halfback

Personal information
- Born: September 20, 1910; Philadelphia, Pennsylvania, U.S.
- Died: March 20, 1990 (aged 79)
- Listed height: 5 ft 11 in (1.80 m)
- Listed weight: 186 lb (84 kg)

Career information
- High school: Germantown (Philadelphia)
- College: None

Career history
- Philadelphia Eagles (1933–1935); Reading Keys (1936)
- Stats at Pro Football Reference

Richard H. Lackman (September 20, 1910 – March 12, 1990) was an American professional football halfback who played three seasons with the Philadelphia Eagles of the National Football League (NFL).

== Early life ==
Richard H. Lackman was born on September 20, 1910, in Philadelphia, Pennsylvania. He played high school football at Germantown High School in Philadelphia. He did not play college football.

== Professional career ==
Lackman signed with the Philadelphia Eagles in 1933. He had played semi-pro football before joining the Eagles. He played in four games for the Eagles during the 1933 season, rushing 17 times for 59 yards while also throwing an interception. Lackman appeared in eight games in 1934, recording four carries for nine yards and four catches for 83 yards. He played in all 11 games during his third year with the Eagles in 1935, totaling 22 rushing attempts for 56 yards and five receptions for 49 yards. The Eagles finished the year with a 2–9 record. He became a free agent after the season.

Lackman played in one game, a start, for the Reading Keys during the 1936 season. He wore jersey number 15 with the Keys.

== Personal life ==
Lackman died on March 12, 1990.
