= Chestnut Hill, Philadelphia =

Chestnut Hill
- Neighborhood
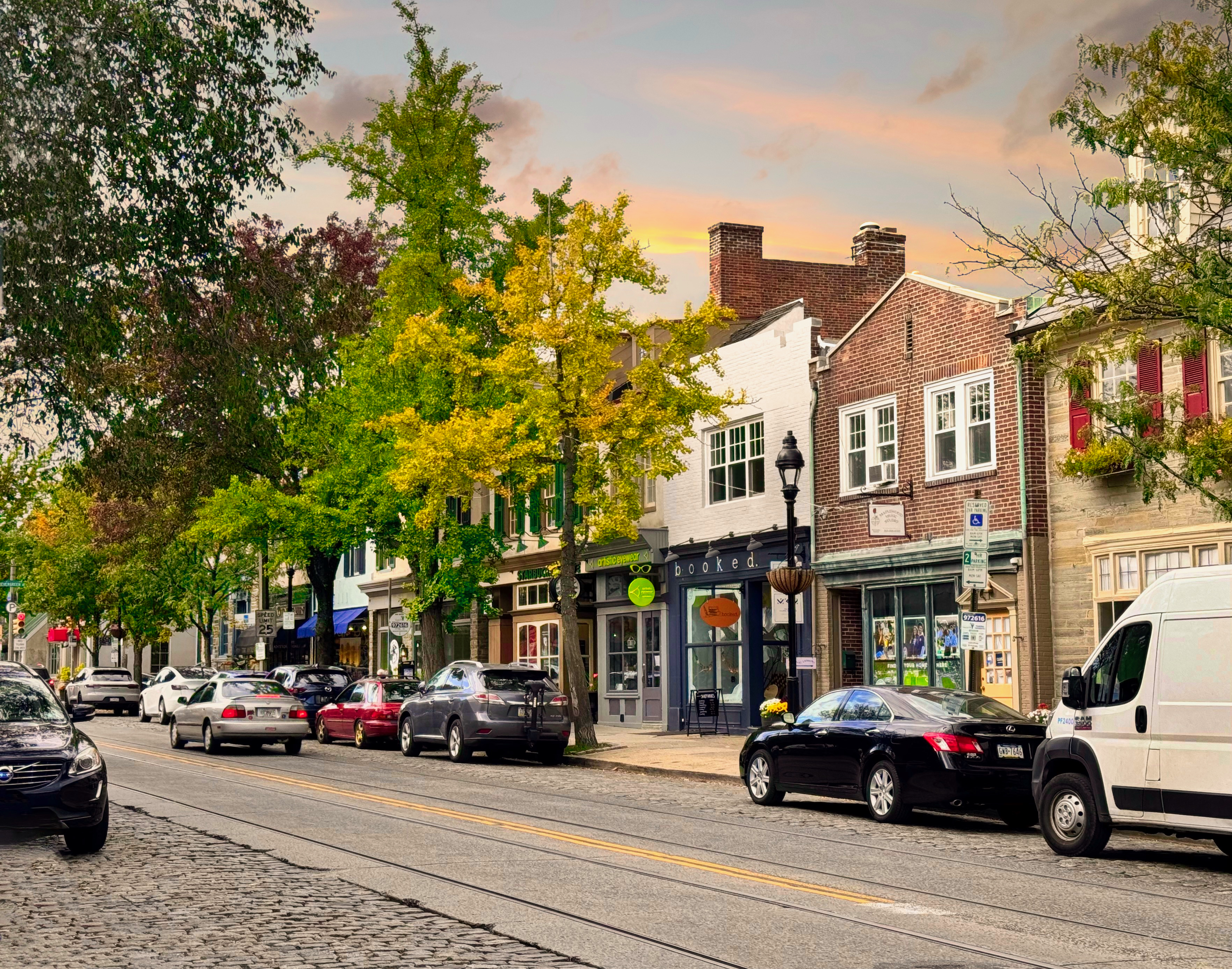
- The Chestnut Hill business district

- Location within Philadelphia
- Coordinates: 40°04′12″N 75°12′22″W
- Country: United States
- State: Pennsylvania
- County: Philadelphia
- City: Philadelphia
- ZIP Code: 19118
- Area codes: 215, 267 and 445

Chestnut Hill is a neighborhood in the Northwest Philadelphia section of Philadelphia, Pennsylvania, United States. It is known for the high incomes of its residents and high real estate values, as well as its private schools.

== Geography ==
=== Boundaries ===
Chestnut Hill is bounded as follows:

- on the northwest by Northwestern Avenue (a county line and city limit, beyond which lies a panhandle of Springfield Township, Montgomery County that juts into Whitemarsh Township);
- on the west by the Wissahickon Gorge (part of the Fairmount Park system) (beyond which lie Upper Roxborough and Andorra);
- on the northeast by Stenton Avenue (a county line and city limit, beyond which lie Erdenheim and Wyndmoor, both in Springfield Township); and
- on the southeast by the Cresheim Valley (part of Fairmount Park) (beyond which lies Mount Airy).

=== ZIP code ===
The USPS does not officially correlate neighborhood names to Philadelphia ZIP codes (all are called simply "Philadelphia" or "Phila"). However, the 19118 ZIP code is almost entirely coterminous with the cultural-consensus boundaries of Chestnut Hill.

== History ==
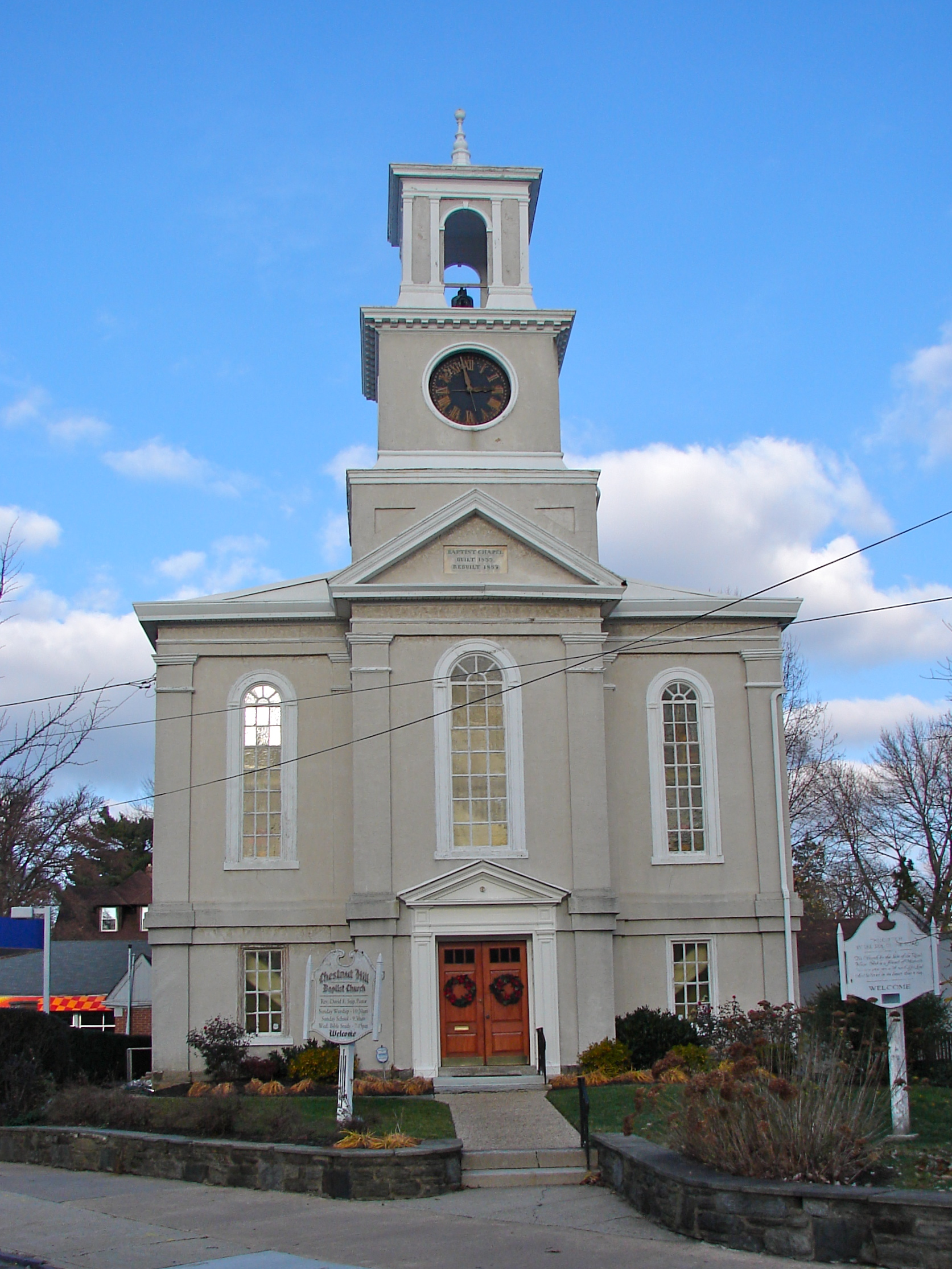
Chestnut Hill Baptist Church built 1835

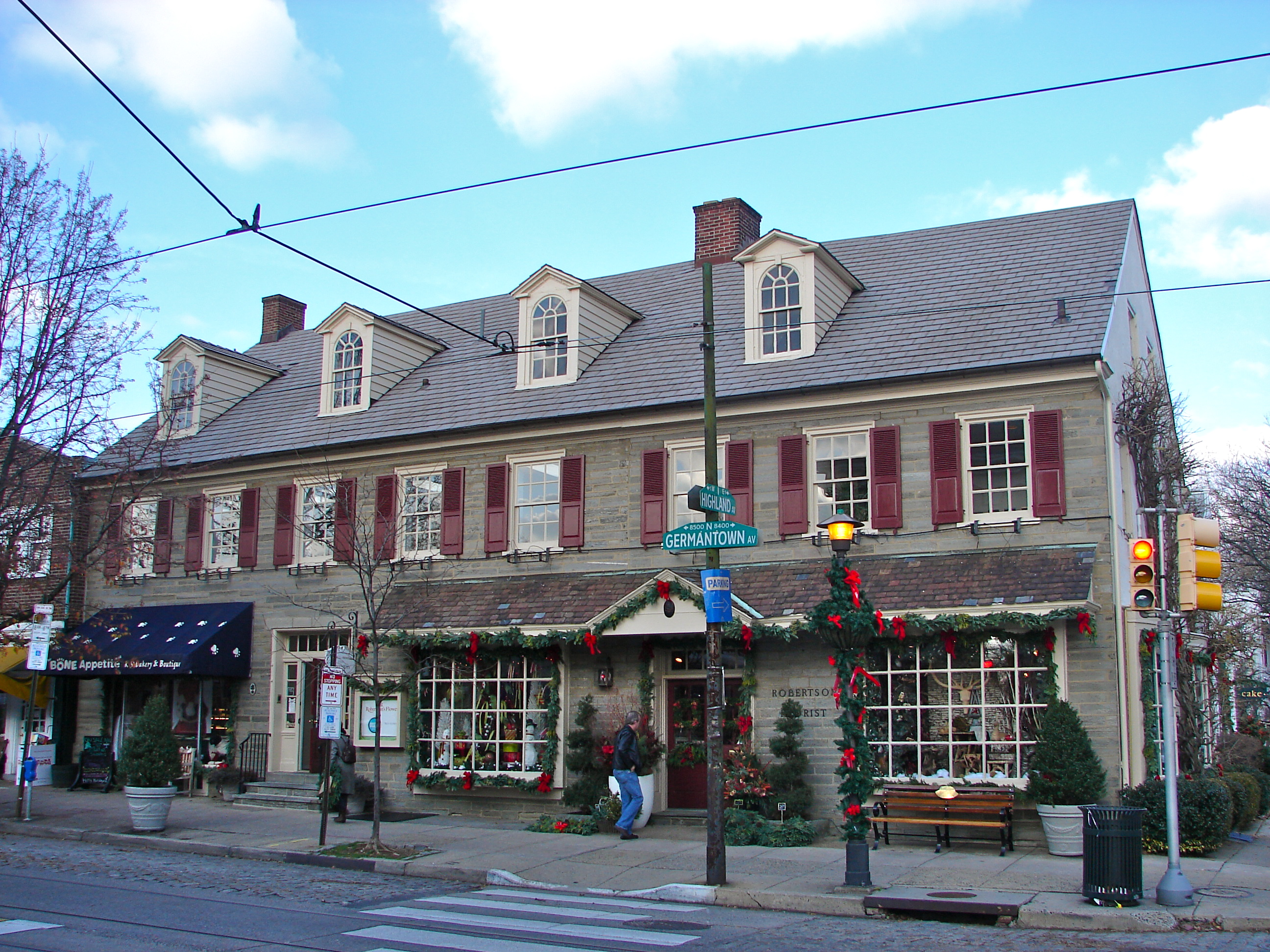
Old Cress Hotel at 8501 Germantown Avenue in Chestnut Hill

The village of Chestnut Hill was part of the German Township laid out by Francis Daniel Pastorius and came to include the settlements originally known as Sommerhausen and Crefeld, as well as part of Cresheim. It served as a gateway between Philadelphia and the nearby farmlands. During the American Revolutionary War era (late 18th century), the area was one of many summer vacation spots due to its higher elevation, 400–500 feet (120 to 150 m) above sea level, and cooler temperatures than the historic Center City. Chestnut Hill is still stereotypically known as one of the more affluent sections of Philadelphia. However, there are many residents who fall within lower/middle class incomes.

Chestnut Hill (along with many other towns and farmlands of Philadelphia County) became part of the City of Philadelphia in 1854 as part of the Act of Consolidation, when the County and the City became completely coterminous. In the same year, the Chestnut Hill Railroad (Chestnut Hill East Line) opened, making an easy commute to and from Center City. In 1884, a second railway line was added by the Philadelphia, Germantown and Chestnut Hill Railroad (Connecting Railway).

During the American Civil War, Chestnut Hill was home to Mower U.S. Army General Hospital, constructed to serve Union army soldiers.

From the mid-19th century through the mid-20th, the neighborhood served as both a "railroad suburb" and a "streetcar suburb" of Center City; although it was part of Philadelphia, it was a leafy outlying part functioning as a bedroom community. The neighborhood contains a wide variety of 19th and early 20th century residential buildings by many of the most prominent Philadelphia architects.

In 1985, the neighborhood was designated as the Chestnut Hill Historic District with the National Register of Historic Places. Citing its natural resources, architectural character, and thoughtful planning, the American Planning Association has recognized it among its Great Places in America.

== Historic and notable architecture ==
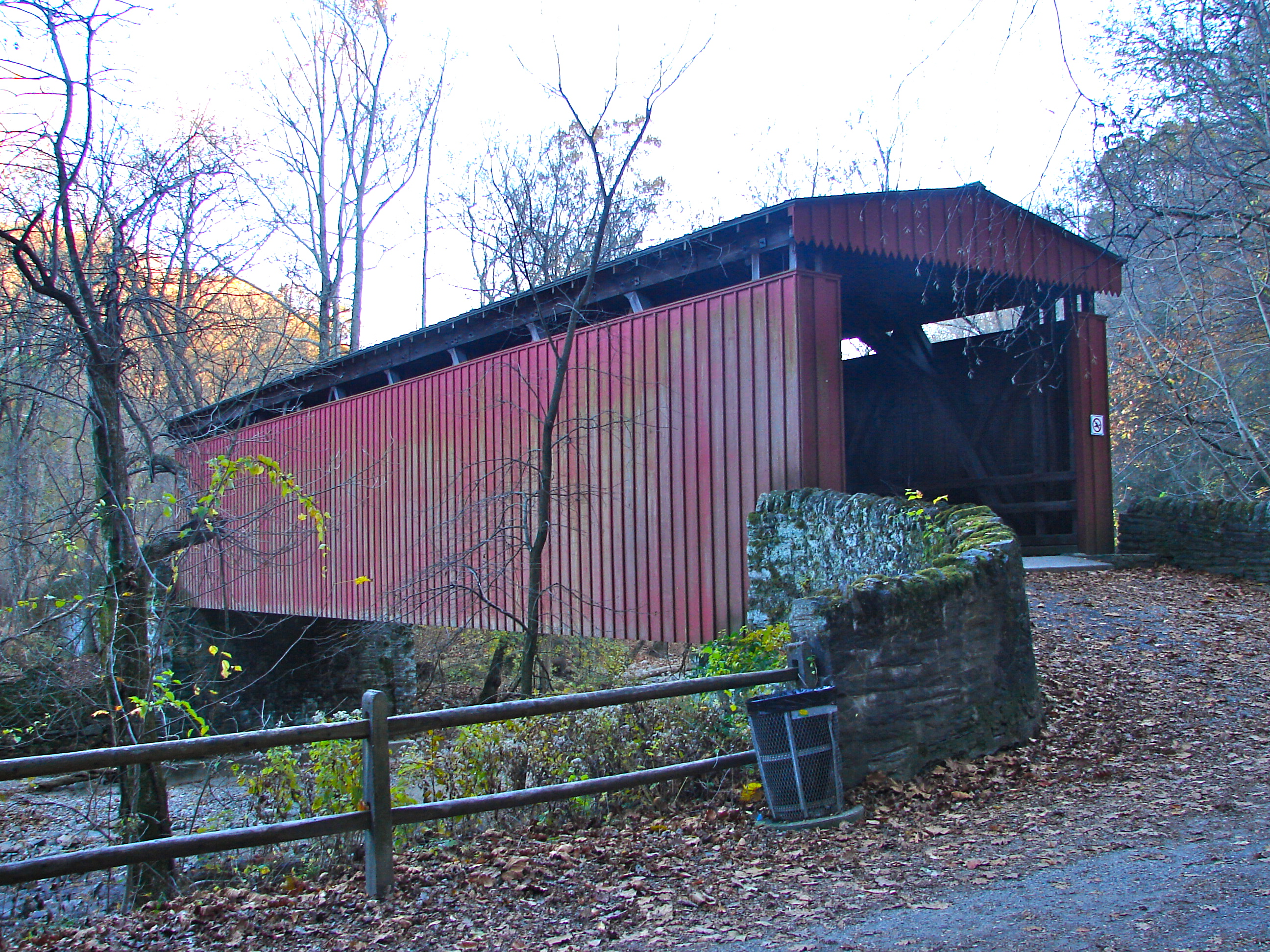
Thomas Mill Covered Bridge

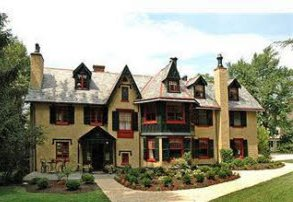
Inglewood Cottage on Bethlehem Pike

The Chestnut Hill listings on the National Register of Historic Places:

- Anglecot (1883), designed by Wilson Eyre.
- Chestnut Hill Historic District
- Druim Moir Historic District, includes Romanesque Revival mansion (1883–86), designed by G. W. & W. D. Hewitt.
- Graver's Lane Station (1883), designed by Frank Furness.
- John Story Jenks School (1922), designed by Irwin T. Catharine.
- Thomas Mill Bridge (across the Wissahickon Creek, the only traditional covered bridge in Philadelphia).
- Wissahickon Inn (now Chestnut Hill Academy) (1883–84), designed by G. W. & W. D. Hewitt.
- The Margaret Esherick House, designed by architect Louis Kahn (1959-1962), added to Register 2023.

Other historic and notable properties include:

- High Hollow, The George Howe House (1914–17), designed by George Howe
- Inglewood Cottage (1850), designed by Thomas Ustick Walter
- Vanna Venturi House (1962–64), designed by Robert Venturi

== Public transportation ==
Public transportation in southeastern Pennsylvania, which includes Philadelphia and the surrounding counties, is provided by SEPTA, the region's mass transit authority.

=== Regional rail (commuter rail) ===
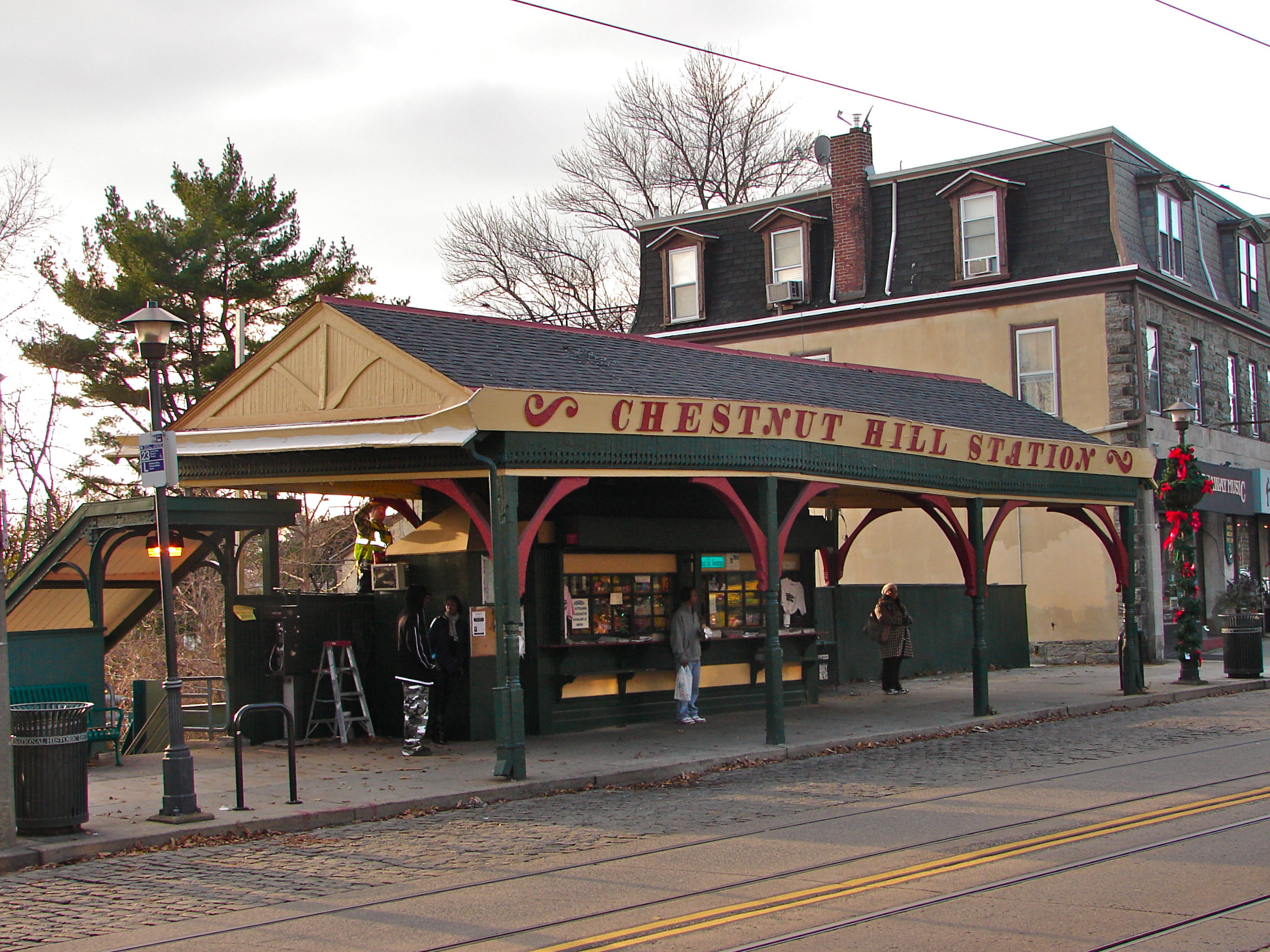
Chestnut Hill West SEPTA Station on Germantown Avenue

Two SEPTA Regional Rail commuter train lines serve Chestnut Hill: the Chestnut Hill East Line and Chestnut Hill West Line.

=== Buses ===
Chestnut Hill is served by SEPTA bus routes from both the City Transit Division (23, 77 and L) and the Suburban Division (94 and 97).

=== Trolleys ===
Trams in the southeastern Pennsylvania region are known as trolleys. The trolley network of this region was very extensive prior to World War II, but has shrunk since that era. Chestnut Hill was formerly served by trolleys. Trolley service to Chestnut Hill began in 1894, and trolley tracks still run down the Belgian-block-paved main street of the neighborhood, Germantown Avenue, which was served by SEPTA Route 23. SEPTA "temporarily suspended" regular trolley service in 1992. From 1992 until 1996, weekend-only service ran between Chestnut Hill and Mount Airy, re-branded The "Chestnut Hill Trolley." Sporadic trolley charter trips ran down Germantown Avenue and into North Philadelphia until 2003.

In 2010, the Pennsylvania Department of Transportation completed work on restoring segments of the trolley infrastructure and streetscape in Chestnut Hill, Mount Airy and Germantown. As of 2011, SEPTA spokespeople publicly state that there are no plans to reinstate trolley service on Route 23, despite claims to the contrary in their annual capital budget reports. The dismantling of Route 23 infrastructure is unpopular with a large segment of local residents.

== Education ==
=== Colleges and universities ===
- Chestnut Hill College

=== Primary and secondary schools ===
==== Public education ====
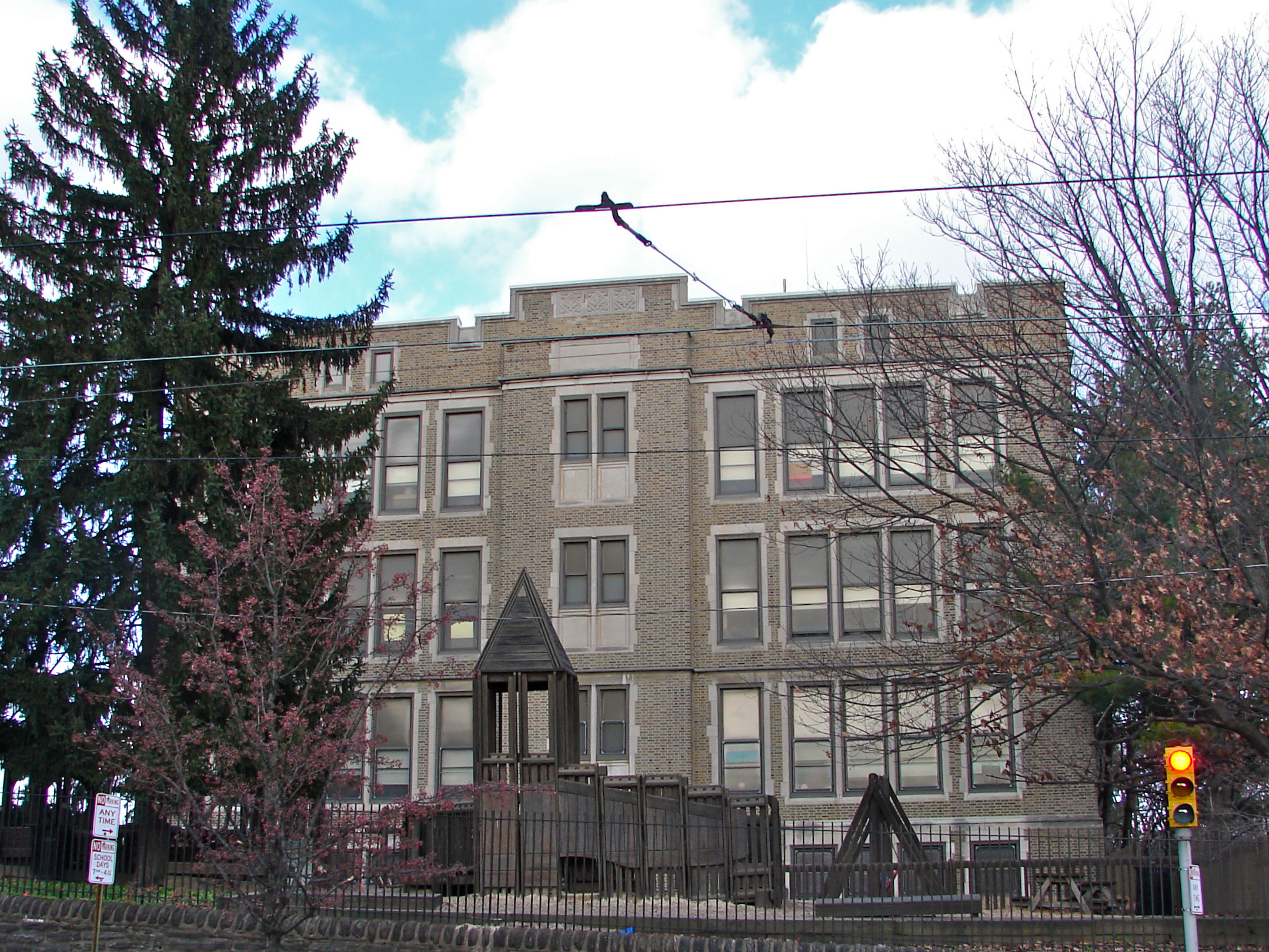
John Story Jenks School

Residents are zoned to schools in the School District of Philadelphia. Students in grades kindergarten through 8 are zoned to John Story Jenks School, while students in grades 9 through 12 are zoned to Roxborough High School.

Students were previously zoned to Germantown High School.

==== Private education ====
Chestnut Hill is home to several private schools.

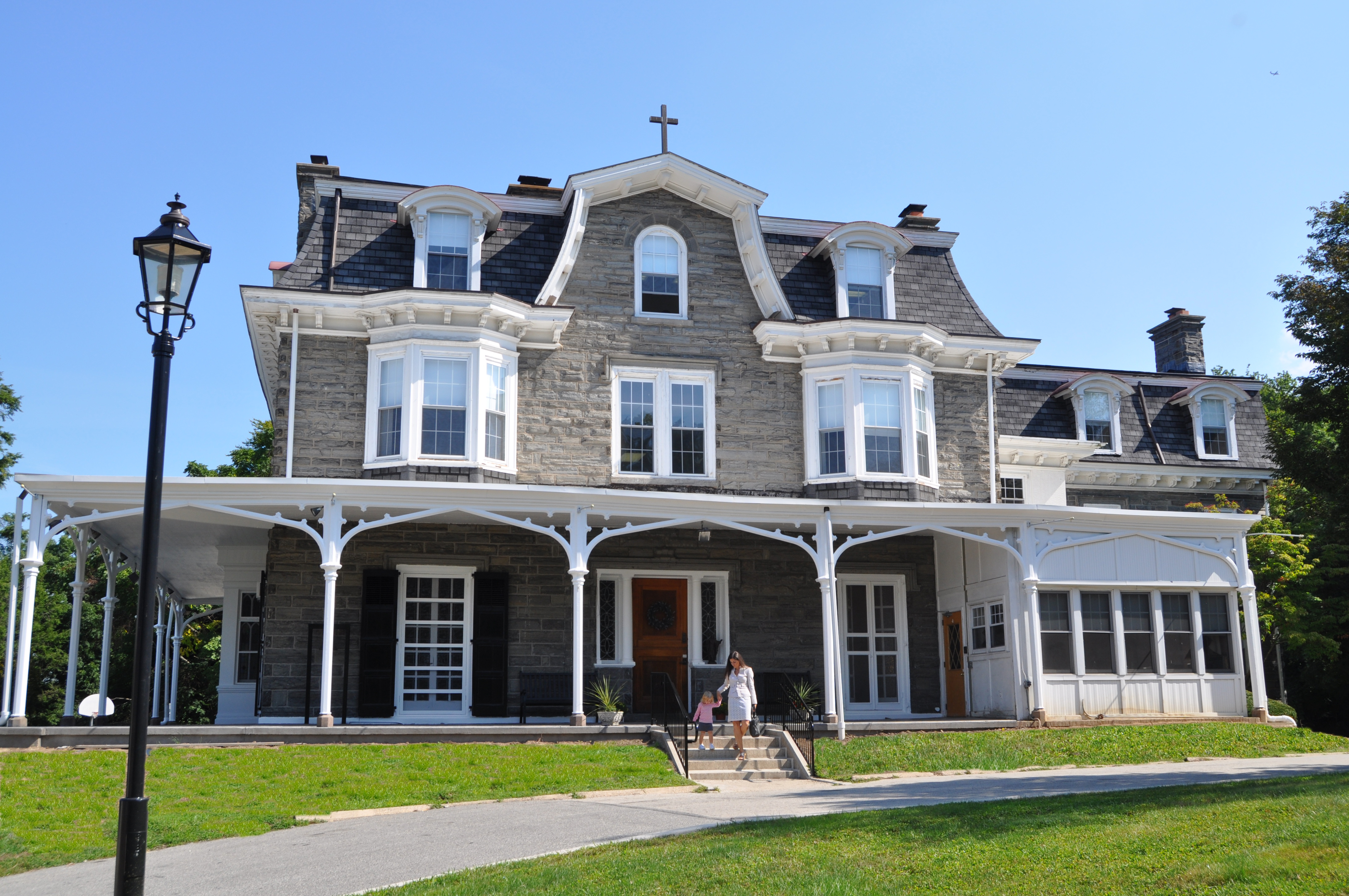

Norwood-Fontbonne Academy is an independent, catholic academy that educates students age 3 - 8th grade and offers two academic paths: Primary and Montessori.

Springside-Chestnut Hill Academy educates students in PreK - 12th grade.

The Crefeld School serves students in 7th grade - 12th grade.

=== Public libraries ===
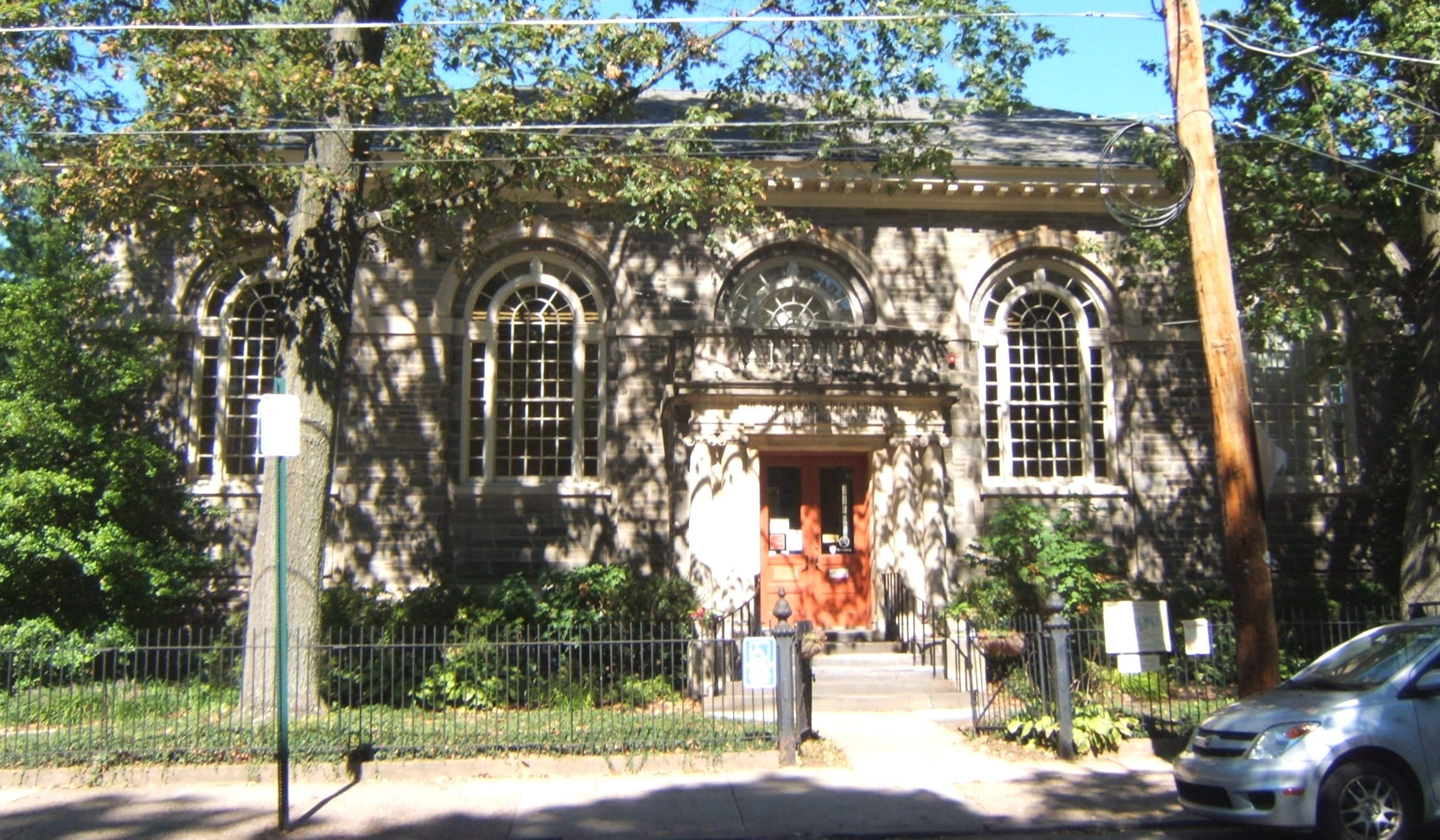
Chestnut Hill Library

Free Library of Philadelphia operates the Chestnut Hill Branch at 8711 Germantown Avenue.

== Parks, arboretums, and recreation ==
- Morris Arboretum of the University of Pennsylvania
- Pastorius Park
- Wissahickon Valley Park of the Fairmount Park system

The community previously held the Chestnut Hill Harry Potter Festival, but in 2018 the event was canceled since the copyright owners cracked down on for-profit uses of the brand. In 2017 there were 50,000 attendees to that year's 7th annual event.

In 2019, the festival resumed as the Witches & Wizards Festival.

== Other notable civic institutions ==
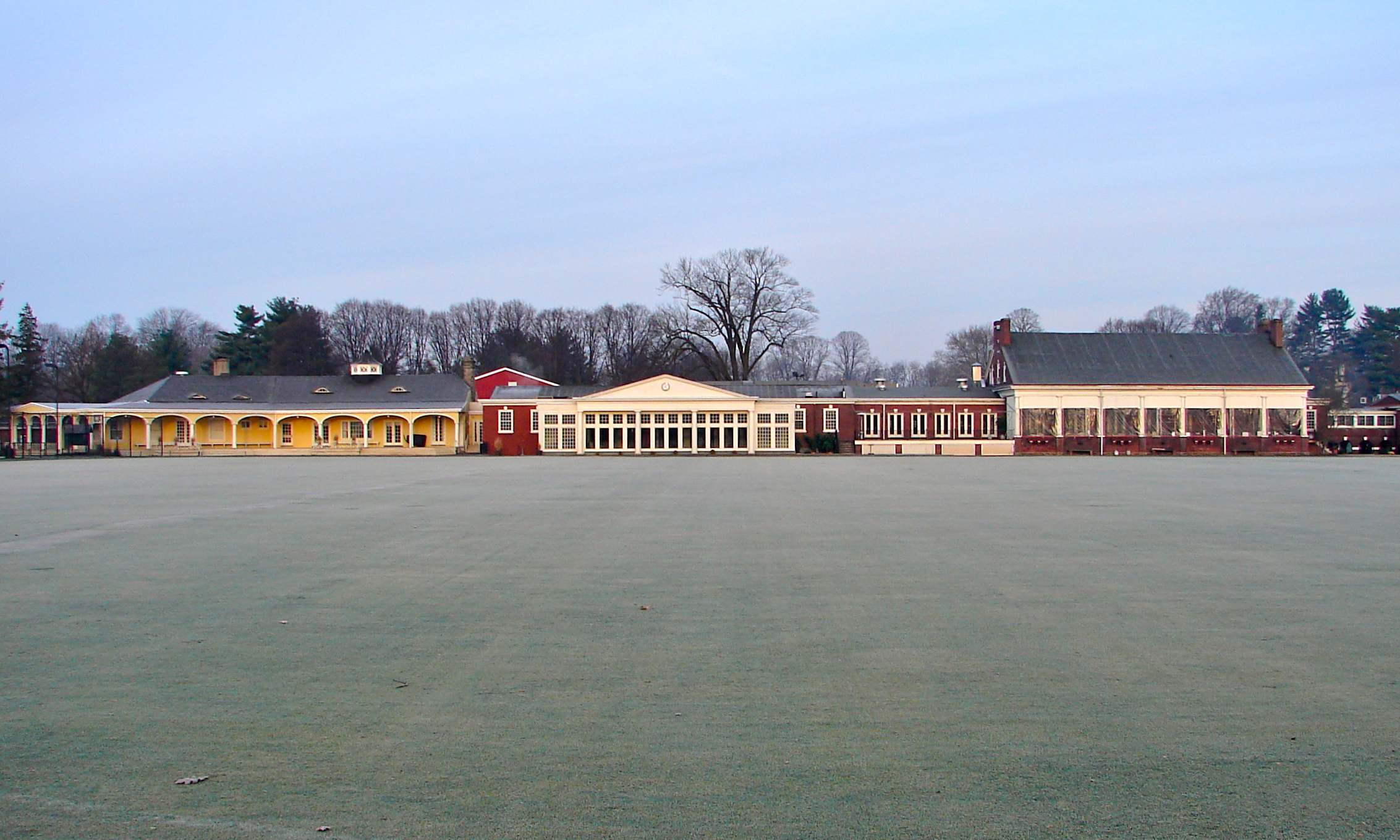
Philadelphia Cricket Club

- Philadelphia Cricket Club
- Wissahickon Skating Club
- Woodmere Art Museum

== Notable people ==
- R. Tucker Abbott, malacologist and author
- Willie Anderson, golfer, winner of four U.S. Opens
- E. Digby Baltzell, author and sociologist
- Maud Banks, tennis player
- Francis Bohlen (1868–1942), Algernon Sydney Biddle professor of law at the University of Pennsylvania Law School
- James Bond, ornithologist; namesake of Ian Fleming's fictional secret agent
- Adolph E. Borie merchant, civil war financier, Secretary of the Navy
- Joseph S. Clark, former U.S. senator from Pennsylvania and former mayor of Philadelphia
- Joe Daley, professional golfer
- Richardson Dilworth, former mayor of Philadelphia
- Eleanor Widener Dixon (1891-1966), socialite and philanthropist
- George Gordon Meade Easby, great-grandson of General George Meade
- Philo Taylor Farnsworth, (August 19, 1906 – March 11, 1971) was an inventor and television pioneer
- Melissa Fitzgerald, actress
- William J. Green, III, former mayor of Philadelphia
- Albert M. Greenfield, businessman, political activist, and philanthropist
- Henry H. Houston, railroad businessman and developer
- W. Thacher Longstreth, former City Councilman At-Large
- Alexander Lawton Mackall, journalist, editor, and gastronomic expert
- Alice Mason (real estate broker)
- David Morse, actor
- George M. Ottinger, artist
- Alec Ounsworth, musician (born 1977)
- Georges Perrier, former resident and celebrity chef, and former owner and chef at Le Bec Fin, and several other restaurants in Philadelphia.
- Charles S. Parmenter, chemist
- Christopher Stuart Patterson (born 1842), Dean of the University of Pennsylvania Law School
- Alan Porter, Major League Baseball umpire
- Henry C. Pitz, Illustrator
- Frank Rizzo, former police commissioner of Philadelphia and former mayor of Philadelphia
- Brian L. Roberts, CEO of Comcast Corporation
- Witold Rybczynski, architect and urban policy scholar
- Hugh Scott, U.S. Congressman and senator
- Denise Scott Brown, architect
- Frederick Winslow Taylor, engineer, management theorist, and consultant
- Marcus Tracy, professional soccer player with Danish club AaB
- Pearl Van Sciver, artist
- Robert Venturi, architect
- Jean Girard, race car driver
