= Anglecot =

Historic house in Pennsylvania, United States

- The Anglecot
- U.S. National Register of Historic Places
- U.S. Historic district – Contributing property
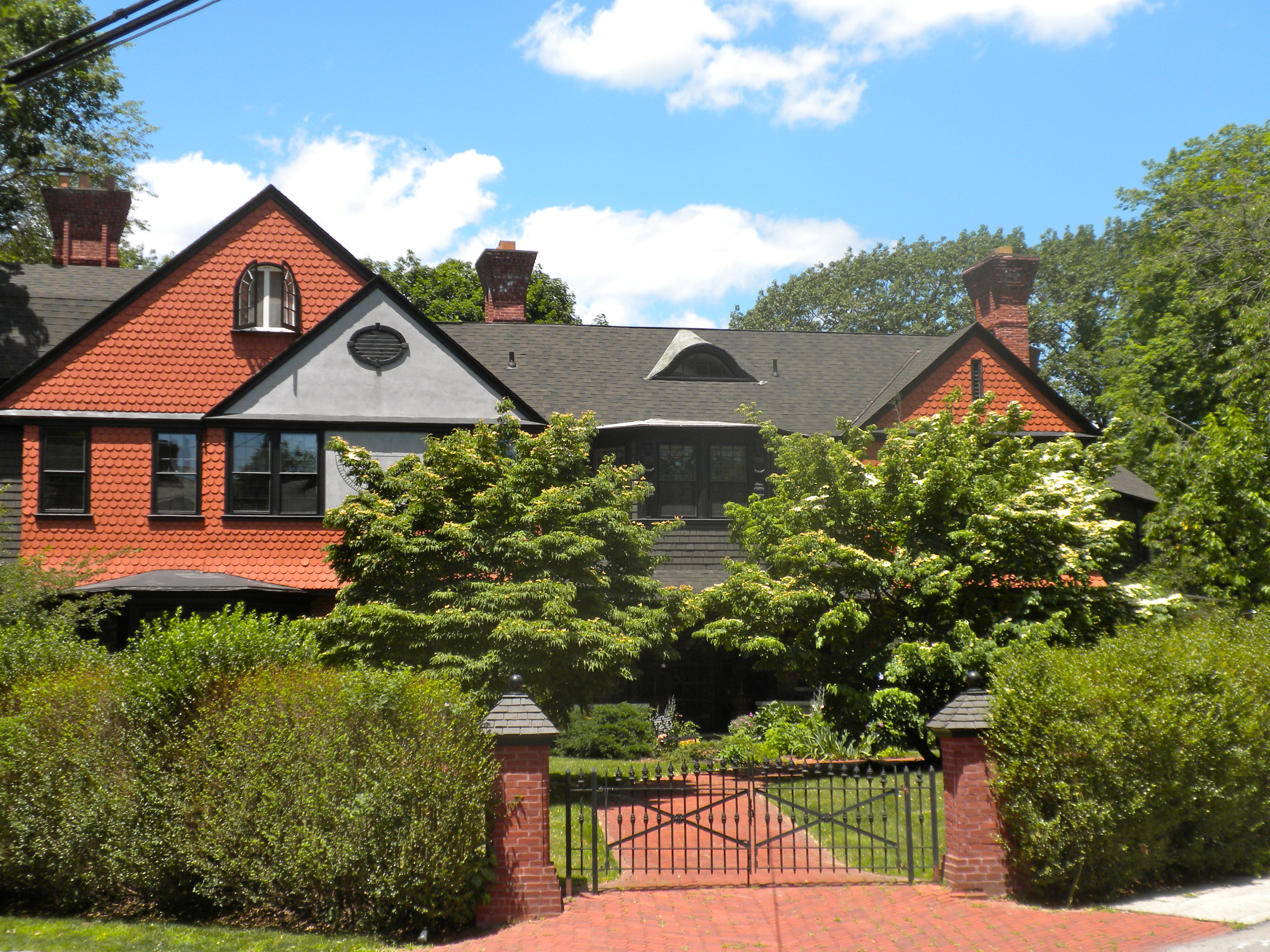

- Location within Philadelphia Location within Pennsylvania Location within the United States
- Location: Evergreen & Prospect Avenues; Philadelphia, Pennsylvania
- Coordinates: 40°4′51″N 75°12′14″W
- Area: 1 acre (0.40 ha)
- Built: 1883
- Architect: Wilson Eyre; John J. Boyle (sculptor)
- Architectural style: Queen Anne
- NRHP reference No.: 82003806
- Added to NRHP: April 19, 1982

The Anglecot, also known as the Potter Residence, is an historic residence in the Chestnut Hill neighborhood of Philadelphia, Pennsylvania, United States.

Designed by noted Philadelphia architect Wilson Eyre for Charles Adams Potter (1860-1925), a manufacturer of linoleum, it was added to the National Register of Historic Places in 1982.

== History and architectural features ==
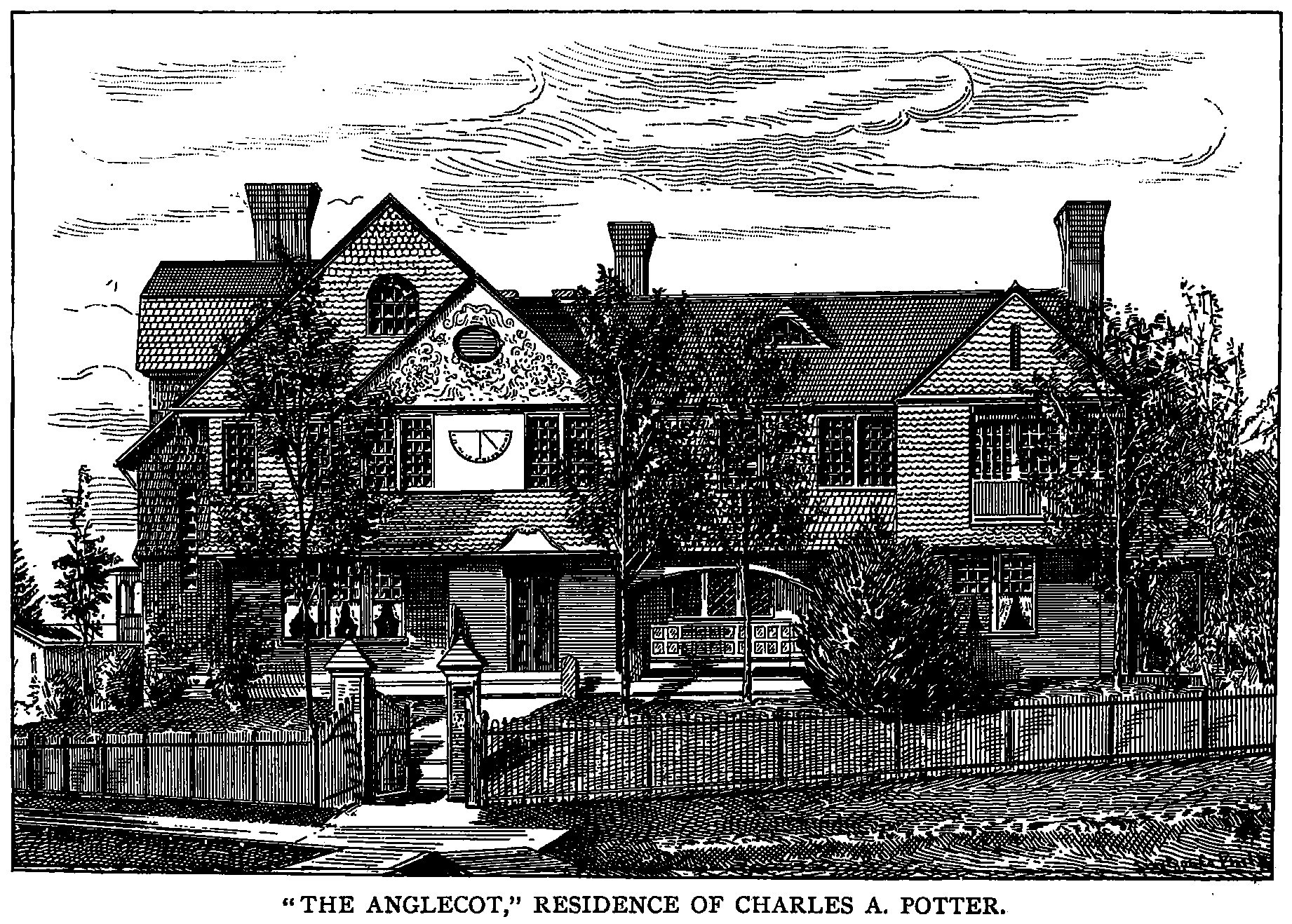
"Anglecot" in an 1889 woodcut.

This historic structure was named "Anglecot," a truncation of the phrase, "Angled Cottage," in recognition of its placement at a forty-five-degree angle, when it was built, to the intersection of Evergreen and Prospect Avenues in Chestnut Hill.

It was designed by noted Philadelphia architect Wilson Eyre for linoleum manufacturer Charles Adams Potter (1860-1925).

In 1903, Charles Potter and his wife hosted a debutante ball for fifty guests at Anglecot in honor of their daughter, Dorothy Potter. Their home was also the site of several other social events throughout that decade.

In 1914, Philadelphia-area newspapers reported that the Potter family and Margaret H. Spencer, the fiancée of their son, Charles A. Potter Jr., were forced to quarantine at the Potter's home when Spencer was diagnosed with scarlet fever while visiting Anglecot.

In April 1935, Herbert F. Diener, Inc. represented the estate of Anglecot's deceased owner, Charles Potter; Diener was responsible for granting a multi-year lease on the property to Dr. Joseph Van Horn.

Anglecot was converted into a sanatorium sometime before 1951, and continued to operate as a healthcare facility during the 1970s.

Added to the National Register of Historic Places in 1982, it is a contributing property of the Chestnut Hill Historic District.

It was then divided into nine condominiums between 1981 and 1983 by Richard Snowden and his grandmother, Virginia C. Wilmsen, who had formed Anglecot Associates to restore the home and place an easement on it to ensure its preservation.
