= Hope Charter School, Philadelphia =

Coordinates: 40.05627°N 75.15692°W

Information
- Closed: 2013
- Grades: 9-12

Hope Charter School was a free, public high school available to all 9th through 12th grade students, located in the West Oak Lane section of Philadelphia, Pennsylvania.

The school's charter was one of three schools whose charter was not renewed in September 2012 by the Philadelphia School Reform Commission. The school closed at the end of 2012-13 school year.
