= Ogontz Hall =

- U.S. National Register of Historic Places
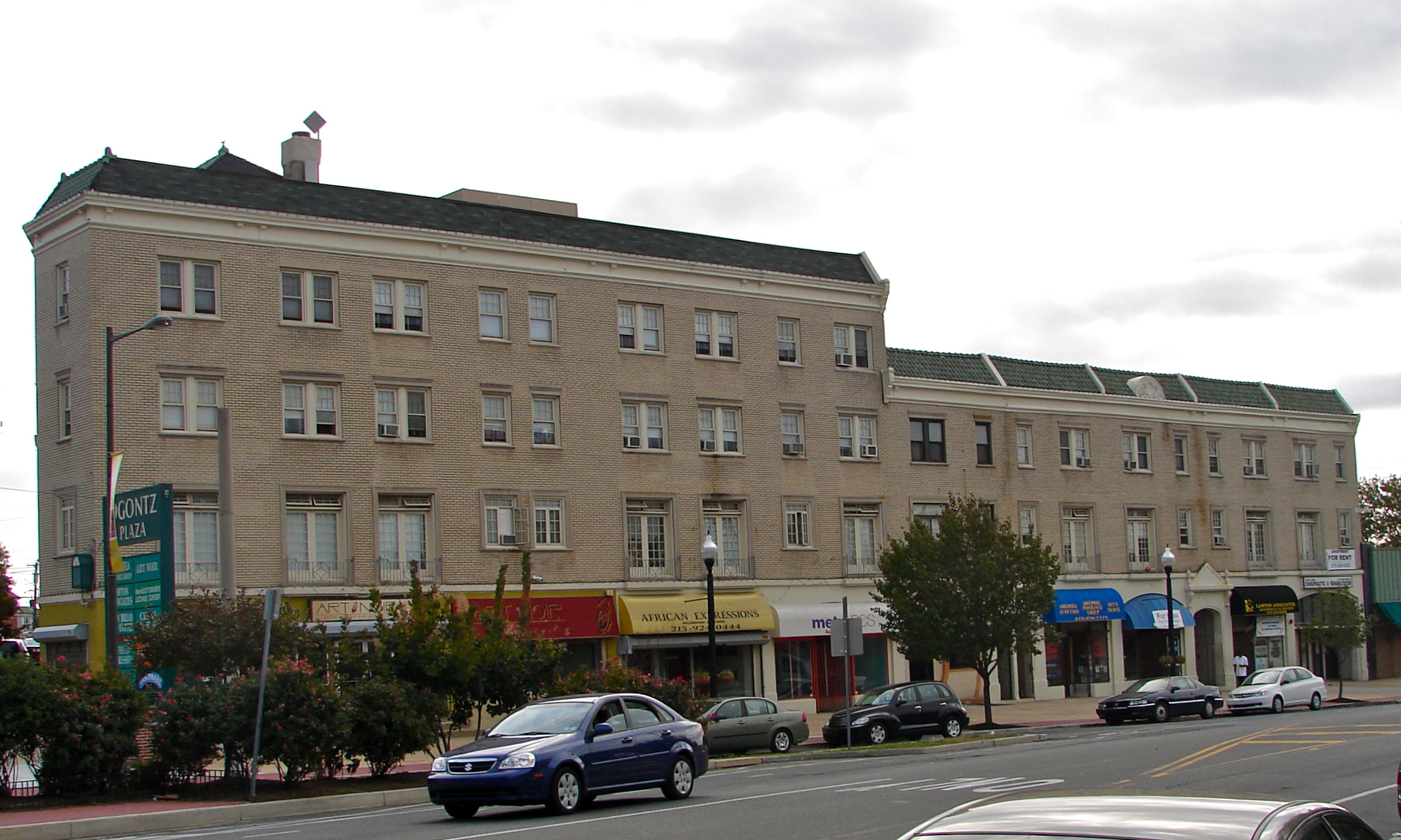
- Ogontz Hall, September 2010

- Location within Philadelphia Location within Pennsylvania Location within the United States
- Location: 7175-7165 Ogontz Ave., Philadelphia, Pennsylvania
- Coordinates: 40°3′51″N 75°9′9″W
- Area: 0.5 acres (0.20 ha)
- Built: 1929
- Architect: Murphy, G. Harold
- Architectural style: Colonial Revival, Other, Spanish Colonial Revival
- NRHP reference No.: 91001708
- Added to NRHP: November 14, 1991

Ogontz Hall is an historic, combined residential and commercial building complex in the West Oak Lane neighborhood of Philadelphia, Pennsylvania, United States.

The Hall was added to the National Register of Historic Places in 1991.

== History and architectural features ==
Built in 1929, it consists of six buildings, the primary one being the four-story Ogontz Hall; the others are three stories. The buildings share a commercial front. They have Spanish Colonial Revival architecture with a limestone and buff brick exterior and terra cotta tile roofing.
