= Martin Luther King High School (Philadelphia) =

Location
- 6100 Stenton Avenue; Philadelphia, Pennsylvania 19138; United States; 40.0560°N 75.1614°W

Information
- Type: Public high school
- Established: 1973
- School district: School District of Philadelphia
- Principal: Keisha Wilkins
- Teaching staff: 43.10 (FTE)
- Grades: 9–12
- Enrollment: 527 (2023–2024)
- Student to teacher ratio: 12.23
- Color
- Mascot: Cougar
- Website: Martin Luther King High School

Martin Luther King High School is a neighborhood public high school located in the East Germantown section of Philadelphia, Pennsylvania. It is located at the intersection of Stenton Avenue and Haines Street in Philadelphia. It is a neighborhood school, meaning no application is necessary for students who live in the West Oak Lane and Germantown neighborhoods of Philadelphia. It is named after Martin Luther King Jr.

== History ==
The school opened on February 8, 1972. Originally it housed grades 9-10, while nearby Germantown High School housed grades 11-12, as the school district intended to keep students in Northwest Philadelphia economically integrated. Multiple students were stabbed and hit with metal pipes during a December 5, 1972 altercation between gangs. Some neighborhoods in proximity to King, such as East Mount Airy and West Oak Lane, wanted King to become a 9-12 school because Germantown High was located near poorer areas. Eventually Germantown and King became separate 9-12 schools. The campuses are about 1 mile (1.6 km) apart.

Programs at King High include JROTC and Business and Computers Technology.

Their team mascot is the cougar.

As of the 2005-2006 school year, the school had a population of 1,780 students, mostly African-American. In the 2012-2013 school year King had 750 students. Germantown closed in 2013 and was merged into Martin Luther King High School, causing King's student body to increase to 1,178 for the 2013-2014 school year. A school district $304 million budget shortfall caused the schools to merge.

Germantown students later attended King High and the merger was the subject of the 2014 documentary We Could Be King, directed by Judd Ehrlich.

== Student body ==
As of 2013 King's student body is mostly low-income and African-American, and consists largely of those unable to get admission to magnet schools and charter schools. Students with special needs made up about a third of the student body.

== Standard dress code ==
King students are required to wear solid light-colored tops and solid dark-colored bottoms. Their school colors are purple and gold.

== Athletics ==
King has an on-campus athletic field and two weight rooms.

King was previously the athletic rival of Germantown high in football. King's football team won one game in 2012; this was after the other team forfeited. After Germantown closed in 2013 much of its athletic roster joined King's football team. Ed Dunn served as the volunteer head coach of the post-2013 King football team. He had previously worked as a mathematics teacher but had been laid off. In its first year as a merged team, the King football team won its first Philadelphia Public League championship after having nine straight wins.

== Feeder pattern ==
Feeder K-8 schools:

- Ana Blakiston Day School
- John F. McCloskey School
- Pastorius School
- Theodore Roosevelt School

Feeder middle schools:

- Gen. Louis Wagner Middle School
- Morris E. Leeds Middle School

Feeder elementary schools:

- Francis D. Pastorius Elementary School
- Franklin S. Edmonds Elementary School (feeds first into McCloskey)
- Ellwood Elementary School (feeds first into Wagner Middle)
- Julia Ward Howe Elementary School (feeds first into Wagner Middle)
- John B. Kelly Elementary School (feeds first into Roosevelt)
- James Logan Elementary School (feeds first into Roosevelt)
- Joseph Pennell Elementary School (feeds first into Wagner Middle)
- Samuel W. Pennypacker School (feeds first into McCloskey)
- William Rowen School (feeds first into Wagner Middle)
- Wister Elementary School (feeds first into Roosevelt)

The John L. Kinsey School fed into King prior to Kinsey's closure.

== Notable alumni ==
- Eve, musician
- Stefon Jackson, professional basketball player
- Raheem Jarbo, rapper and producer
- Wayne Marshall, professional basketball player
- Ready Rock C, beat boxer, songwriter, Grammy award winner
- Pamela Williams, musician and artist
