= Jenks Academy for the Arts and Sciences =

Location
- 8301 Germantown Ave. Philadelphia, Pennsylvania; 40°04′30″N 75°12′12″W

Information
- Type: Public
- Established: 1923
- Principal: Corinne Scioli
- Grades: K–8
- Colors: blue and gold
- Mascot: Jaguars
- Affiliation: School District of Philadelphia
- Website: John Story Jenks
- John Story Jenks School
- U.S. National Register of Historic Places
- U.S. Historic district – Contributing property
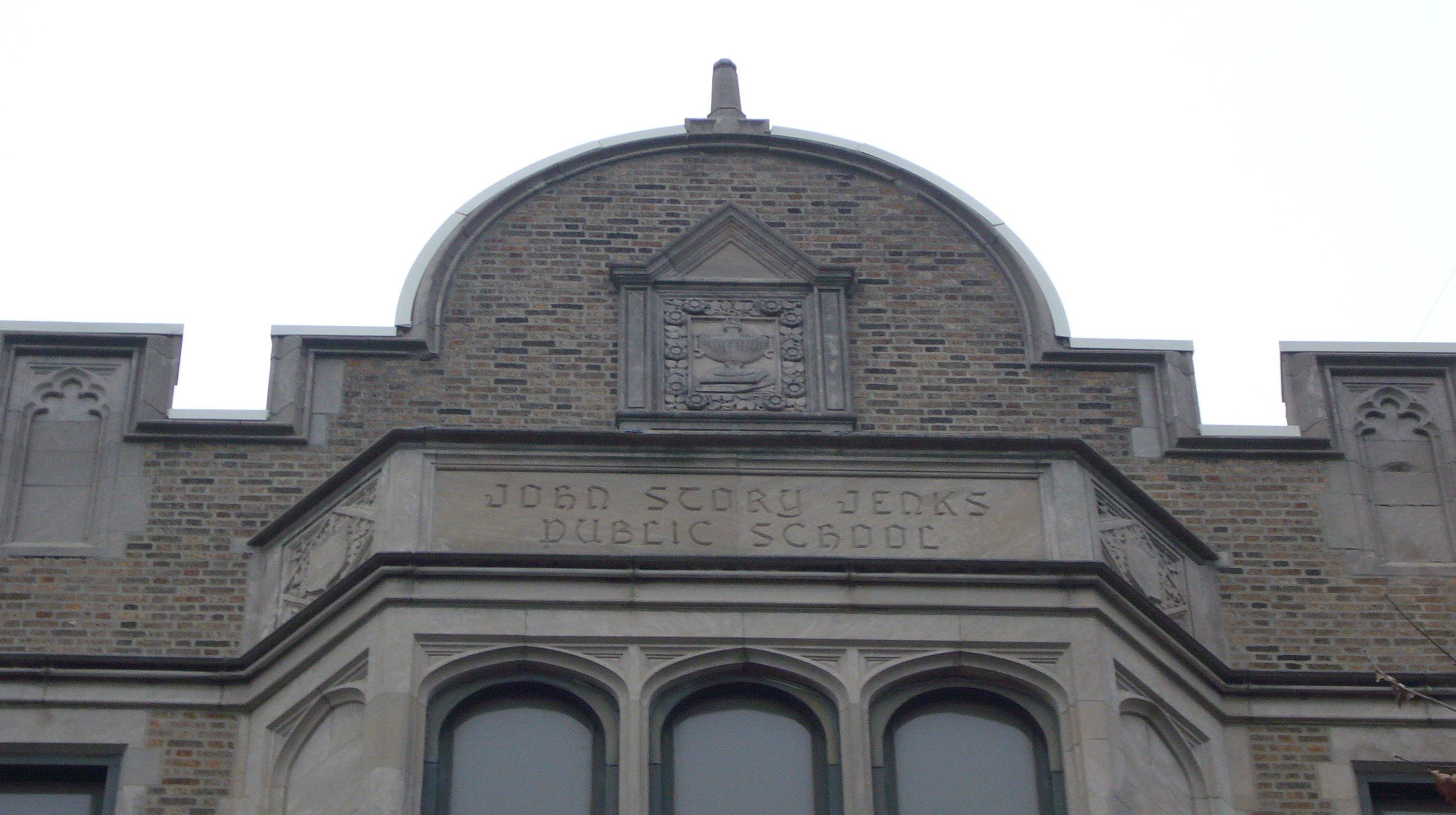

- Location within Philadelphia Location within Pennsylvania Location within the United States
- Built: 1922
- Built by: Cramp & Co.
- Architect: Irwin T. Catharine
- Architectural style: Late Gothic Revival, Tudor Revival
- MPS: Philadelphia Public Schools TR
- NRHP reference No.: 88002286
- Added to NRHP: November 18, 1988

Jenks Academy for the Arts and Sciences is a public K-8 school in the Chestnut Hill section of Philadelphia, Pennsylvania, and is part of the School District of Philadelphia. Jenks serves children from kindergarten through eighth grade and has a student population of about 600. There are two classes in each grade as well as specialized programs for life skills, inclusion/learning support and gifted support. Jenks students are required to wear school uniforms.

== History ==
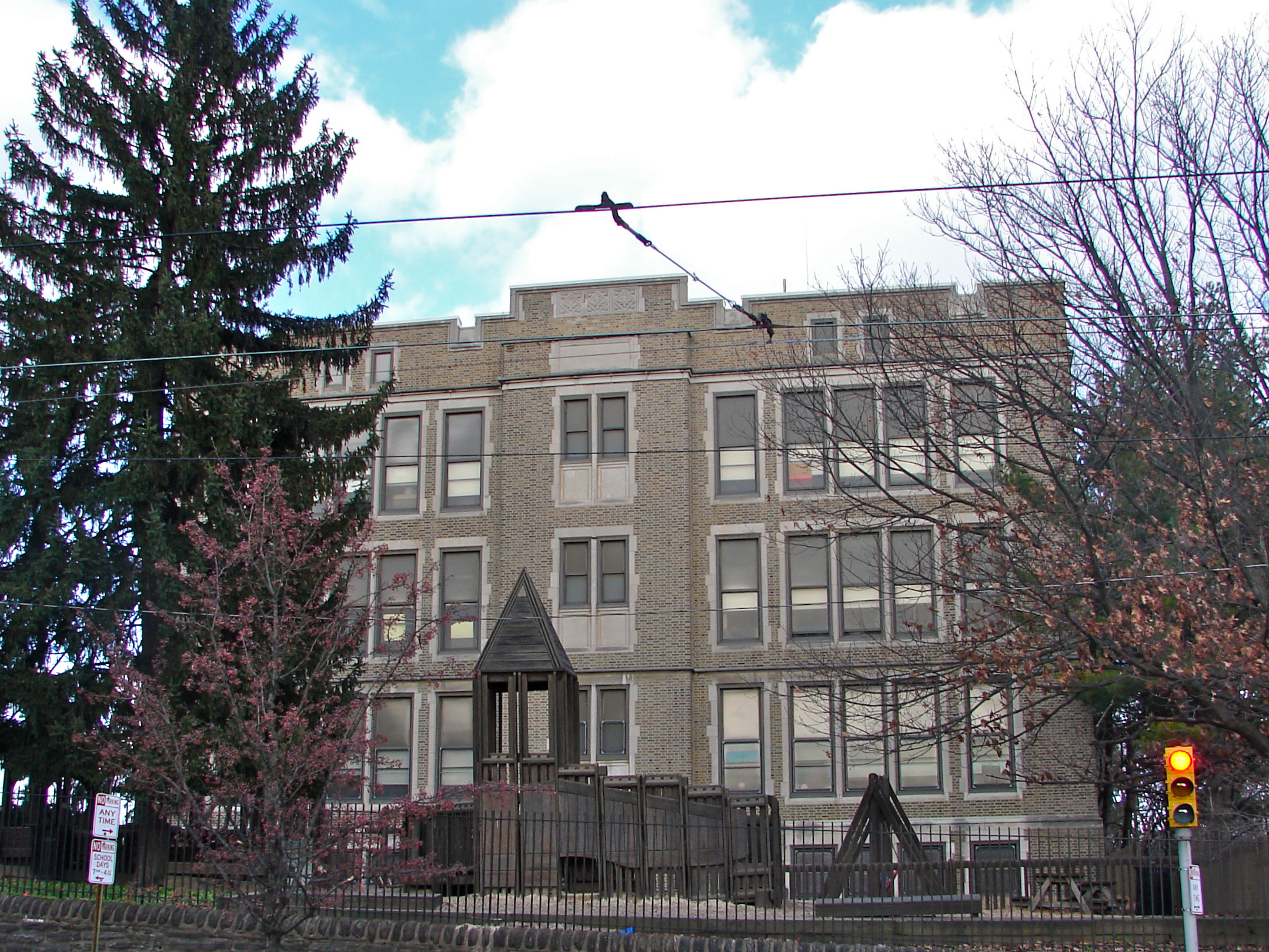
The school from Germantown Avenue

The school was built in 1922 as the John Story Jenks School. It was built in Tudor Revival/Late Gothic Revival style and designed by Irwin T. Catharine, longtime architect for the school district. The building is yellow brick and is relatively ornate with a parapet and stylized Flemish gable at the top of the building. It was built by Cramp & Co. The building was listed on the National Register of Historic Places in 1988.

Jenks was named after John Story Jenks (1839-1923), the merchant, of Randolph and Jenks, who was also a director of Pennsylvania Hospital, Philadelphia Trust Company, Western Savings Fund, Western National Bank and the Insurance Company of North America. He was a member of the Union League, the Historical Society of Pennsylvania and the American Philosophical Society. His home, Inglewood Cottage, designed by Cope & Stewardson, is also located in Chestnut Hill. He served on the Philadelphia Board of Education and was an avid collector and numismatist. He believed coin collecting was “instructive to any young girl or boy” for learning geography, history and languages.

In 2014, the school was renamed to Jenks Academy for the Arts and Sciences. The change came because of an increased focus on the STEM fields.

== Notable alumni ==
- Samantha Johnson - Miss Pennsylvania USA 2007

== Feeder patterns ==
Residents zoned to Jenks are zoned to Roxborough High School.

Residents zoned to Jenks were zoned to Germantown High School prior to Germantown's closure.
