= Inglewood Cottage =

Coordinates: 40.08286°N 75.20877°W

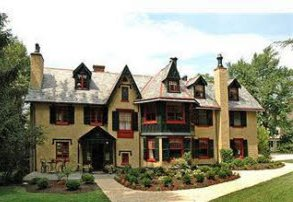

Inglewood Cottage is a Gothic Revival villa, built c. 1850, located at 150 Bethlehem Pike, in the Chestnut Hill section of Philadelphia, Pennsylvania. It was designed by famed American architect Thomas Ustick Walter, Fourth Architect of the U.S. Capitol, and built by Cephas Childs, a prominent Philadelphia lithographer and director of the Chestnut Hill Railroad. The home was among the first summer cottages built in and around Chestnut Hill, Philadelphia, Pennsylvania in the mid to late 19th century for wealthy Center City Philadelphians.

The home was owned for many years by John Story Jenks, a prosperous dry goods merchant, for whom the Philadelphia School District named The John Story Jenks Elementary School. Jenks's summer home, Inglewood, is adjacent to Inglewood Cottage in the same compound. Inglewood is a large Georgian Revival home designed, in its present form, by the architectural firm of Cope & Stewardson.

Jenks's daughter, Mary, and son-in-law, Joseph S. Lovering, and their family lived in the compound throughout much of the 20th century. Inglewood Cottage passed from Lovering family ownership in 1986, Inglewood in 1991.

Inglewood Cottage was modified greatly over the years, mostly by the Lovering family. It was enlarged and altered extensively in 1900 and 1906, by the architectural firm of Kennedy, Hays, & Kelsey, when a new dining room and kitchen were added. The 1906 addition and alterations were carried out by the contracting firm of George S. Roth & Sons. Later alterations included the addition of a solarium on the house's west side, a butler's pantry, gardener's privy, enclosed porch and balcony on the east side, and a garage and potting shed detached structure on the southeast corner of the grounds.

The present configuration of the home consists of six bedrooms (three on the second floor and three, including a large nursery, on the third); three full and two half baths (with high-tank toilets, clawfoot tubs, and period nickel-plated plumbing); two second-floor exterior balconies (one Juliette style); dressing room; library; den; parlor; solarium; breakfast room; dining room with built-in china storage; seven fireplaces (including four wood-burning, two coal-burning, and one gas log); a Franklin wood stove; period gourmet kitchen with original fir cabinets, seven-burner range, built-in refrigeration, and drawer dishwashers; wine storage cellar; cedar-lined closets; and a walk-in linen closet.

The home has undergone extensive restoration since 2004. In 2023, the property received historic designation from the Philadelphia Historical Commission. It is currently owned by Massimo Cristofanilli.
