= William Rowen School =

- U.S. National Register of Historic Places
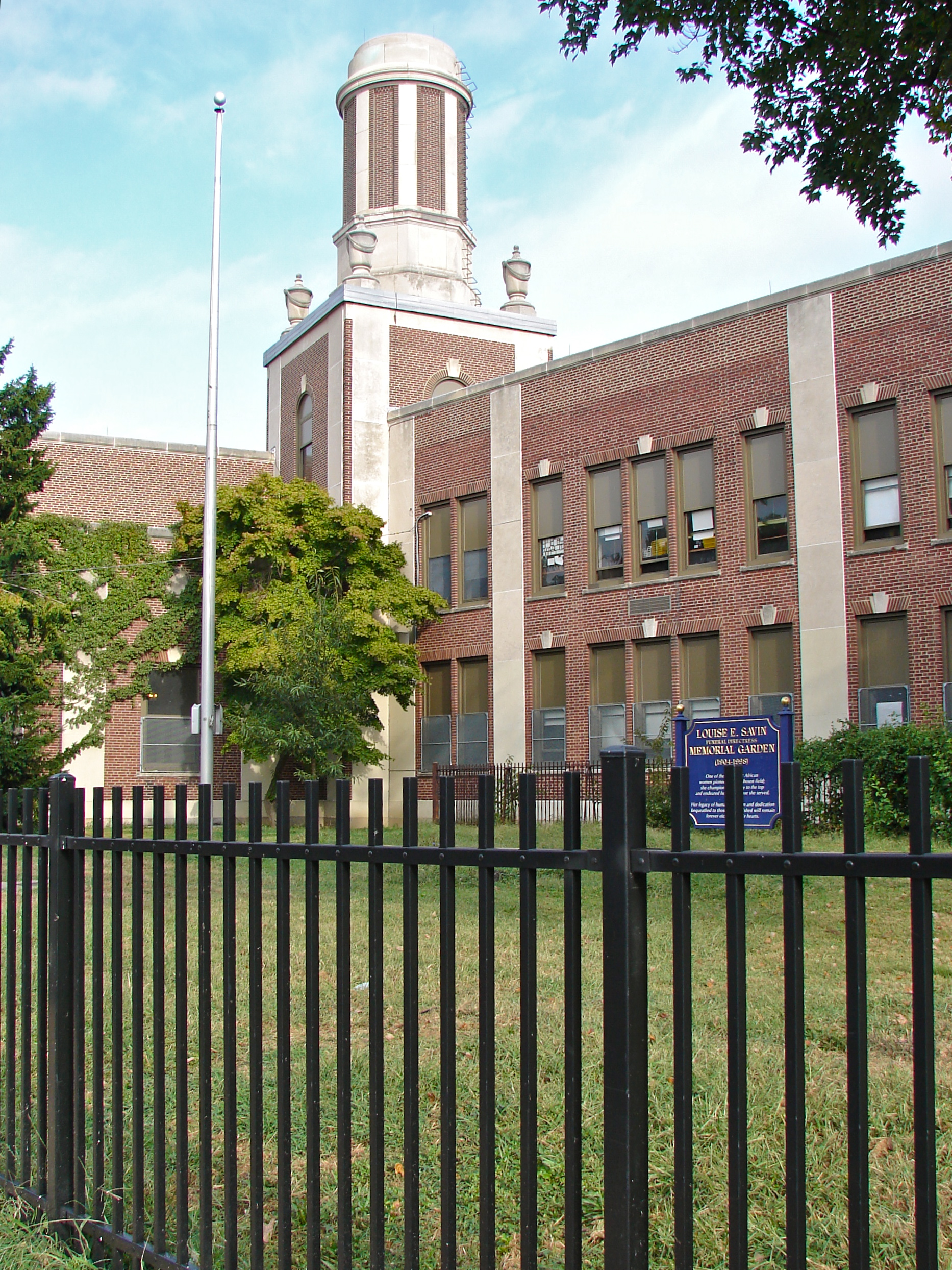
- William Rowen School, September 2010

- Location within Philadelphia Location within Pennsylvania Location within the United States
- Location: 6801 N. 19th St., Philadelphia, Pennsylvania
- Coordinates: 40°3′31″N 75°8′55″W
- Area: 2.5 acres (1.0 ha)
- Built: 1937
- Architect: Catharine, Irwin T.
- Architectural style: Georgian Revival, Moderne
- MPS: Philadelphia Public Schools TR
- NRHP reference No.: 88002318
- Added to NRHP: November 18, 1988

William Rowen Elementary School is a historic American elementary school in the West Oak Lane neighborhood of Philadelphia, Pennsylvania.

Part of the School District of Philadelphia, it was added to the National Register of Historic Places in 1988. The building was named after William Rowen, who had been a member of the Philadelphia Board of Education.

== History and architectural features ==
Designed by Irwin T. Catharine and built between 1937 and 1938, this historic building is a two-story, five-bay, brick building that was created in a Georgian Revival / Moderne-style. It features a large stone entrance and truncated steeple.

The building, which was dedicated on May 20, 1938, was named after William Rowen, a former, three-decade member of the Philadelphia Board of Education.

It was added to the National Register of Historic Places in 1988.

== Feeder patterns ==
Rowen feeds into King High School.
