= Gen. Louis Wagner Middle School =

- Gen. Louis Wagner Junior High School
- U.S. National Register of Historic Places
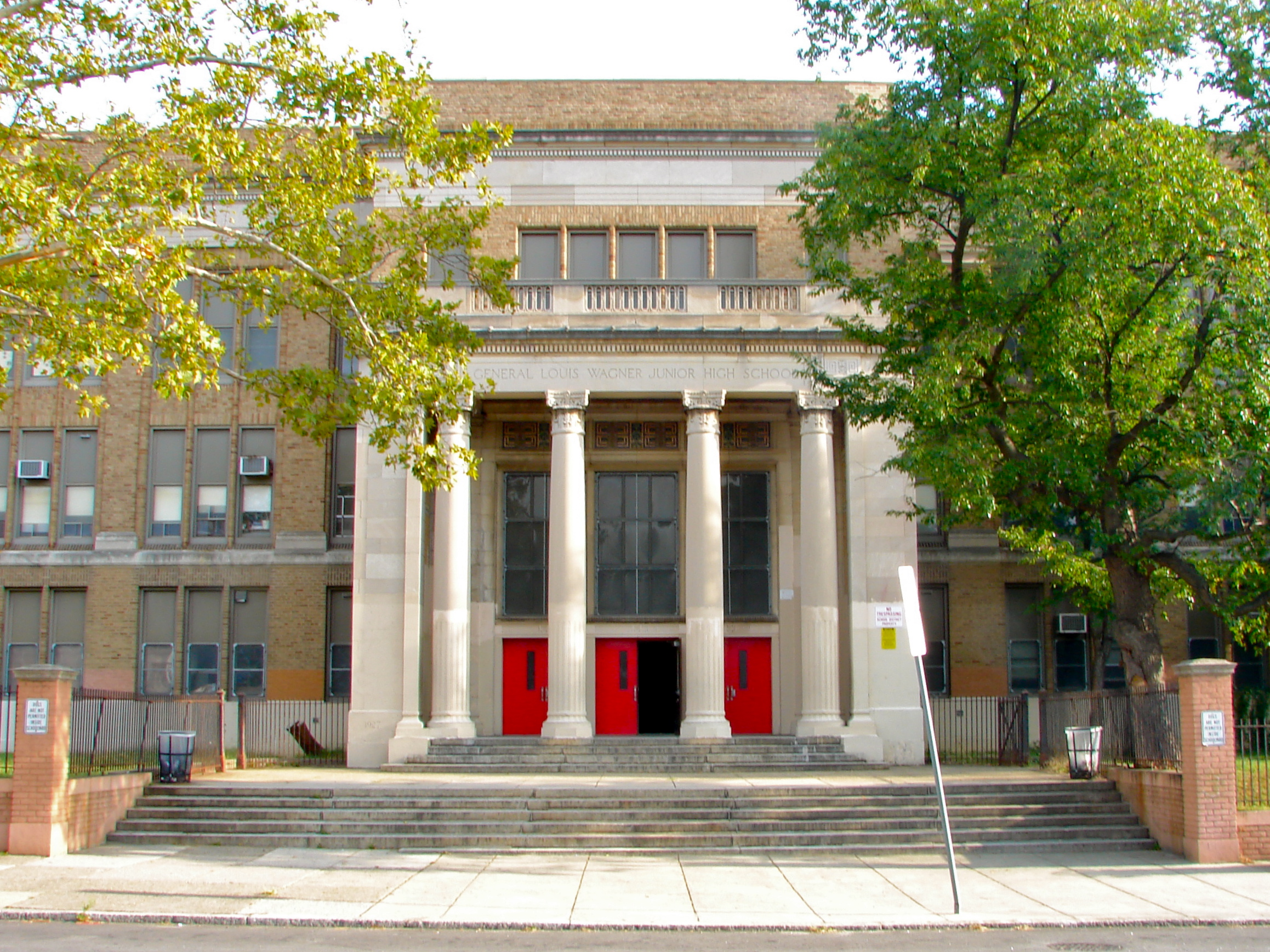
- Gen. Louis Wagner Junior High School, September 2010

- Location within Philadelphia Location within Pennsylvania Location within the United States
- Location: 1701 Chelten Ave., Philadelphia, Pennsylvania
- Coordinates: 40°03′06″N 75°08′51″W
- Area: 1 acre (0.40 ha)
- Built: 1927–1928
- Architect: Irwin T. Catharine
- Architectural style: Classical Revival
- MPS: Philadelphia Public Schools TR
- NRHP reference No.: 86003340
- Added to NRHP: December 4, 1986

General Louis Wagner Middle School, formerly General Louis Wagner Junior High School, is a historic middle school located in the West Oak Lane neighborhood of Philadelphia, Pennsylvania. It is a part of the School District of Philadelphia.

The building was designed by Irwin T. Catharine and built in 1927–1928. It is a three-story, 15 bay, yellow brick building in a Classical Revival-style. It features a projecting center entrance bay with portico and Ionic order columns.

It was added to the National Register of Historic Places in 1986.

Students continue to King High School.
