= Bluebell =

Bluebell, Bluebells, or Bluebelle may refer to:

== Plants ==
- genus Hyacinthoides
  - Common bluebell (H. non-scripta)
  - Spanish bluebell (H. hispanica)
  - Italian bluebell (H. italica)
- genus Muscari (perhaps more commonly known as grape hyacinth)
- genus Mertensia
  - Virginia bluebell (Mertensia virginica)
- Scottish bluebell (harebell) (Campanula rotundifolia)
- Australian royal bluebell (Wahlenbergia gloriosa)
- Texas bluebell (Eustoma russellianum)
- Desert or California bluebell (Phacelia campanularia)

== Places ==
=== Ireland ===
- Bluebell, Dublin, a suburb of Dublin, Ireland

=== United Kingdom ===
- Bluebell Lakes, five fishing lakes near Peterborough, England
- Blue Bell Hill, a hill between Rochester and Maidstone, Kent, England

=== United States ===
- Bluebell, Utah, United States, a census-designated place
- Bluebell Creek, United States, a tributary of the Yukon River in Alaska
- Bluebell Creek (Iowa), United States, a minor tributary of the Upper Mississippi River
- Bluebell Knoll, another name for Boulder Mountain (Utah)

== Entertainment ==
- Bluebell Records, an Italian independent record label active from 1959 to 1969
- The Bluebells, a 1980s Scottish indie new wave band
  - The Bluebells (EP), released in 1983
- The Bluebells, an earlier name of Labelle, an American all-female singing group of the 1960s and '70s
- "Bluebells" (song), a song by Patrick Wolf
- "The Bluebell", a song by Patrick Wolf from The Magic Position
- Bluebell (TV series), a British television drama series in 1986
- Bluebell, a fictional rabbit in the novel Watership Down
- Bluebell, a fictional troll from the miniseries The 10th Kingdom
- Bluebell, a fictional town that is the setting for the TV show Hart of Dixie
- "Bluebells", an episode of the television series Teletubbies
- Margaret Kelly (dancer) (1910–2004), nicknamed "Miss Bluebell", Irish dancer and founder of the Bluebell Girls
- Bluebell, a Chihuahua that plays Betty on Will Trent

== Ships ==
- HMS Bluebell, two Royal Navy ships
- USCGC Bluebell, a United States Coast Guard inland buoy tender
- Bluebelle (ship), a yacht that was the site of a multiple murder in 1961
- Bluebell (1906 ship), a ferry operated in Toronto from 1906 to 1955
- Bluebell, a harbour ferry involved in the Bluebell Collision in Newcastle, Australia

== Sports ==
- Bluebell United F.C., an Irish association football club originally based in Bluebell, Dublin
- Bluebelles, nickname of West Wallsend FC, a senior soccer club in New South Wales, Australia
- Dundonald Bluebell F.C., a Scottish football club based in Cardenden, Fife
- The Bluebell Stadium, a football stadium in Lisburn, County Antrim, Northern Ireland
- Bluebell Stakes, a Listed flat horse race in Ireland

== Other uses ==
- Bluebell Railway, a heritage line running along the border between East and West Sussex, England
- SECR P Class 323 Bluebell, a locomotive
- Bluebell Arboretum, near Smisby, South Derbyshire, England
- Bluebell Mine, Riondel, British Columbia, Canada
- Bluebell (colour)

== See also ==
- Blue Bell (disambiguation)
