= Steve Collett =

British angler and businessman

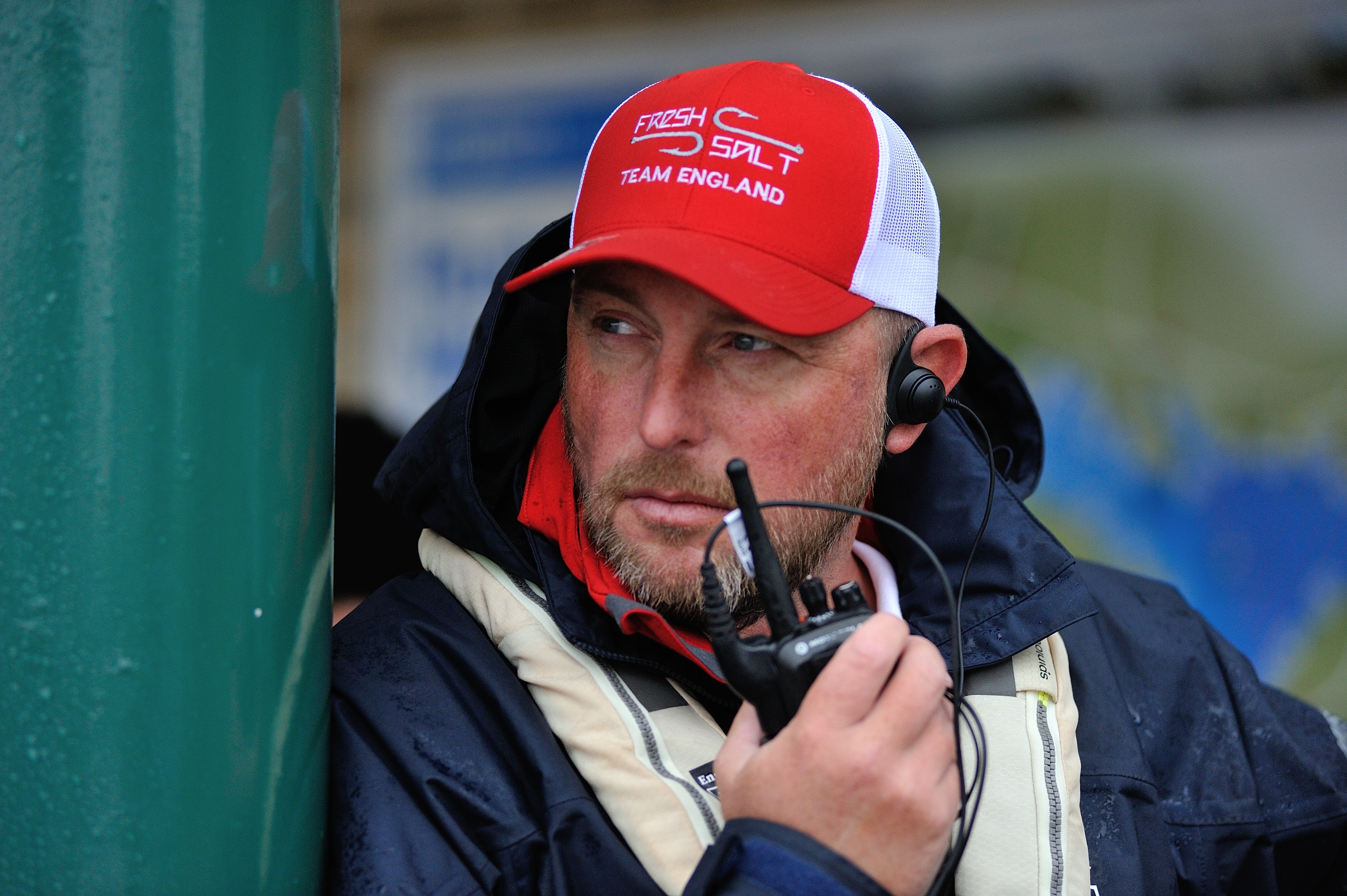
- Born: Stephen Keith Collett; 1972 (age 52–53); Wolverhampton, England
- Occupation(s): angler, journalist and businessman

Steve Collett (Born in 1972) is a British angler and businessman who currently writes in the Anglers Mail. He has written over 1000 articles for publications all over the world. He is best known for his lure fishing expertise and is currently the reigning British Champion and England Manager. Steve has also won the PDC (Professional Darts Championship) Charity cup twice.

Steve owns retailers specialising in fishing tackle equipment in the UK and Europe.

== Early life ==
Collett was born in Wolverhampton, England. Collett lived with his parents in the Whitmore Reans area.

== Career ==
Collett worked in the pharmaceutical industry before making his introduction into the fishing tackle world by joining Masterline international. Collett has been involved in bringing brands to the UK including Rapala Cortland Normark, and more recently the Deeper Fishfinder.

Collett made his writing debut in a publication called “the midland angler” and he writes regularly for the Angler's Mail every week. He has appeared in many fishing programmes including the Kingfisher Series for National Geographic. Steve has also won the PDC (Professional Darts Championship) Charity cup twice. The charity event run by ex-heavyweight Jes Harding raises thousands each year for good causes, and attracts sportspeople including Barry Hearn, Eddie Hearn, Steve Davis and darts legends past and present.

=== Angling ===
Collett is the only UK angler to hold major titles in every discipline of the sport including the prestigious Division one championship, and two times British Lure Angling Championship.

== Statistics ==
- 78: League Lure fishing wins.
- 2: British Lure Championships
- 1: European Street fishing title.
- 1: Division one champion
- 1: CRT European Champion
- 1: Troutmaster finalist
- 1: Penn shore angling champion.
- 84: Open wins.
- Fox rage lure fishing champion (watermark)
