= Benson (fish) =

Large carp in Northamptonshire, England

- Species: Cyprinus carpio
- Sex: Female
- Hatched: 1984
- Died: 4 August 2009 (aged 24–25)

Benson (1984 – 4 August 2009) was "Britain's biggest and best-loved" common carp. Benson's popularity was such that she was caught 63 times in 13 years, although the accessibility that made her popular was also the cause of controversy among angling's elite. She has also been referred to as "the people's fish" and was voted by readers of Angler's Mail as Britain's Favourite Carp in 2005.

The fish, who was female, was originally one of a pair: her original companion, Hedges, disappeared in a flood of the River Nene in 1998. Both fish were named due to a hole in Benson's dorsal fin that resembled a cigarette burn, in a reference to Benson & Hedges. At her peak weight, in 2006, she weighed 64 pounds 2 ounces (29.1 kg).

Benson died on 4 August 2009, aged 25. At the time of her death, she weighed the same as a large dog and was worth £20,000. The owner of the lake where she lived alleged that she was accidentally poisoned by anglers using uncooked tigernuts as bait, though evidence points to the contrary (see section on death below). Another possible cause of death was the complications during egg production.

== Fame ==
Benson lived in the Kingfisher Lake at the Bluebell Lakes complex, at Tansor just outside Oundle in Northamptonshire. She was one of approximately 150 carp in Bluebell Lakes, which are managed "to provide the best environment for growth potential of the fish". Steve Broad, editor of UK Carp magazine, ascribed Benson's fame to "her accessibility":

Among keen anglers there are about only 20 carp that can be seriously called "household names". Benson was near the top of that league. The thing that made Benson famous was her accessibility. Unlike other big carp, she was a day-ticket fish – anyone could go along and try to catch her.

However, this very accessibility made the fish controversial among the sport's elite: "Everyday anglers loved her because there was a chance they could have their photo taken with one of the big fish ... some serious anglers did not like her because she was open to everyone."

Benson's record of being caught so often masks her unpredictability. "There was a period when Benson was caught every Monday for six weeks. Then it seemed that she disappeared for the next 12 months"

== Death ==
The Daily Telegraph reported in August 2009 that the fish had been "poisoned":

A quantity of uncooked nuts, which are toxic to fish who swell up because they cannot process them, were found nearby on the bank. Owner of Bluebell Lakes Tony Bridgefoot, 53, said he feared the fish had been killed by "irresponsible anglers" ... "It seems her demise was caused by the introduction of foods that are harmful to fish."

It has since been confirmed that the most likely cause of death was not nut poisoning, but rather reproductive complications due to gravidity.

Benson's successor as a popular and very large common carp may come from the same haunt. "The same complex where Benson lived boasts a lot of promising 40 lb fish. There's one—the Z-Fish—that is ounces under 50 lb and still growing."
