= Bluebell Creek =

Bluebell Creek can refer to:

- Bluebell Creek (Alaska), a tributary of the Yukon River
- Bluebell Creek (Iowa), a minor tributary of the Upper Mississippi River
