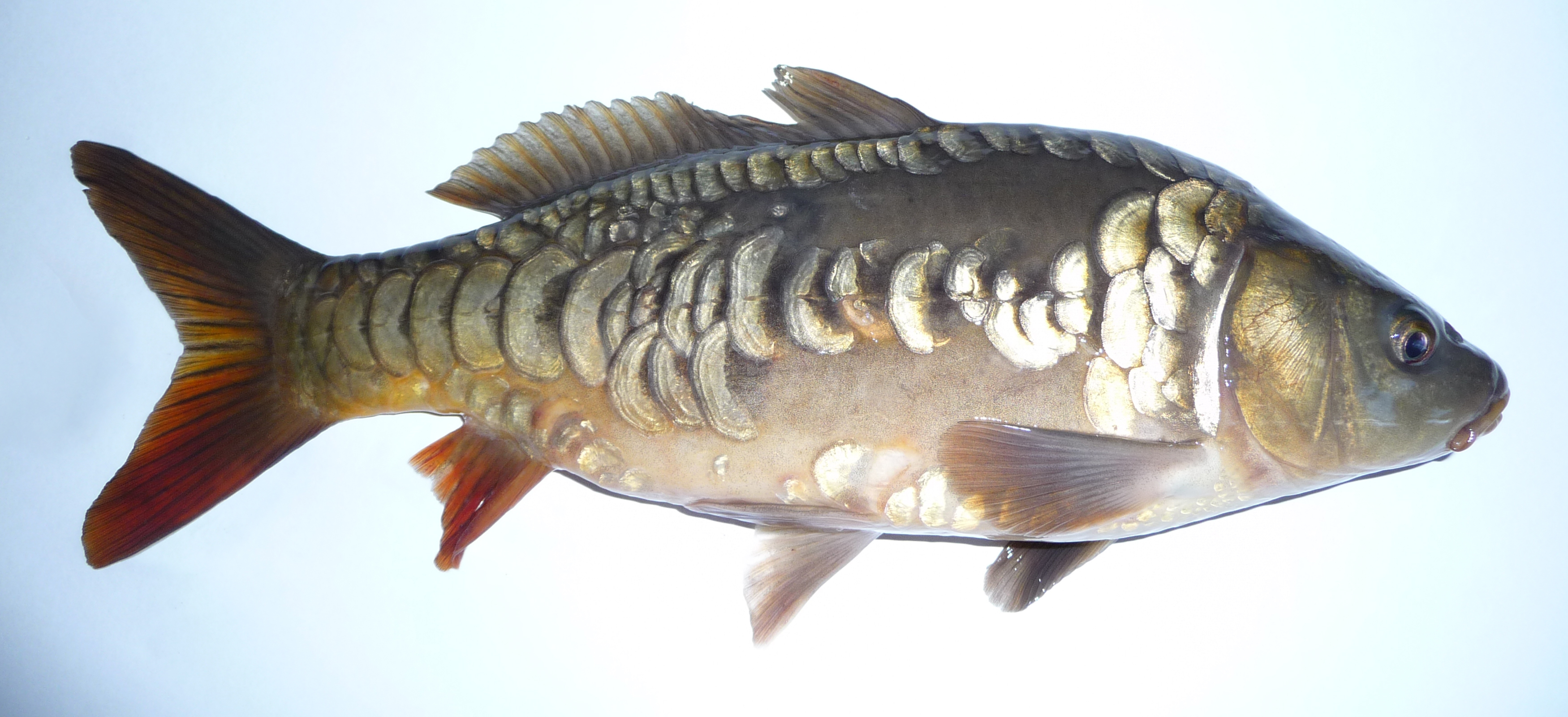

Scientific classification
- Kingdom: Animalia
- Phylum: Chordata
- Class: Actinopterygii
- Division: Teleostei
- Order: Cypriniformes
- Family: Cyprinidae
- Genus: Cyprinus
- Species: C. carpio
- Subspecies: C. c. carpio

Trinomial name
- Cyprinus carpio carpio Linnaeus, 1758

= Cyprinus carpio carpio =

Subspecies of fish

Cyprinus carpio carpio is a subspecies of the common carp that is commonly found in Europe. They are native to much of Europe (notably the Danube and Volga Rivers) and can also be found in the Caucasus and Central Asia. Mitochondrial DNA analysis shows a difference between C. carpio carpio and Cyprinus rubrofuscus. They are omnivorous in nature and feed on mollusks, insects, crustaceans and seeds. Though dark in color, there are some wild caught specimens which are colored orange (maybe domesticated ones that are only released into the rivers). This subspecies has also been domesticated in European ponds for hundreds of years. They are considered as a naturalized species in most US states.
