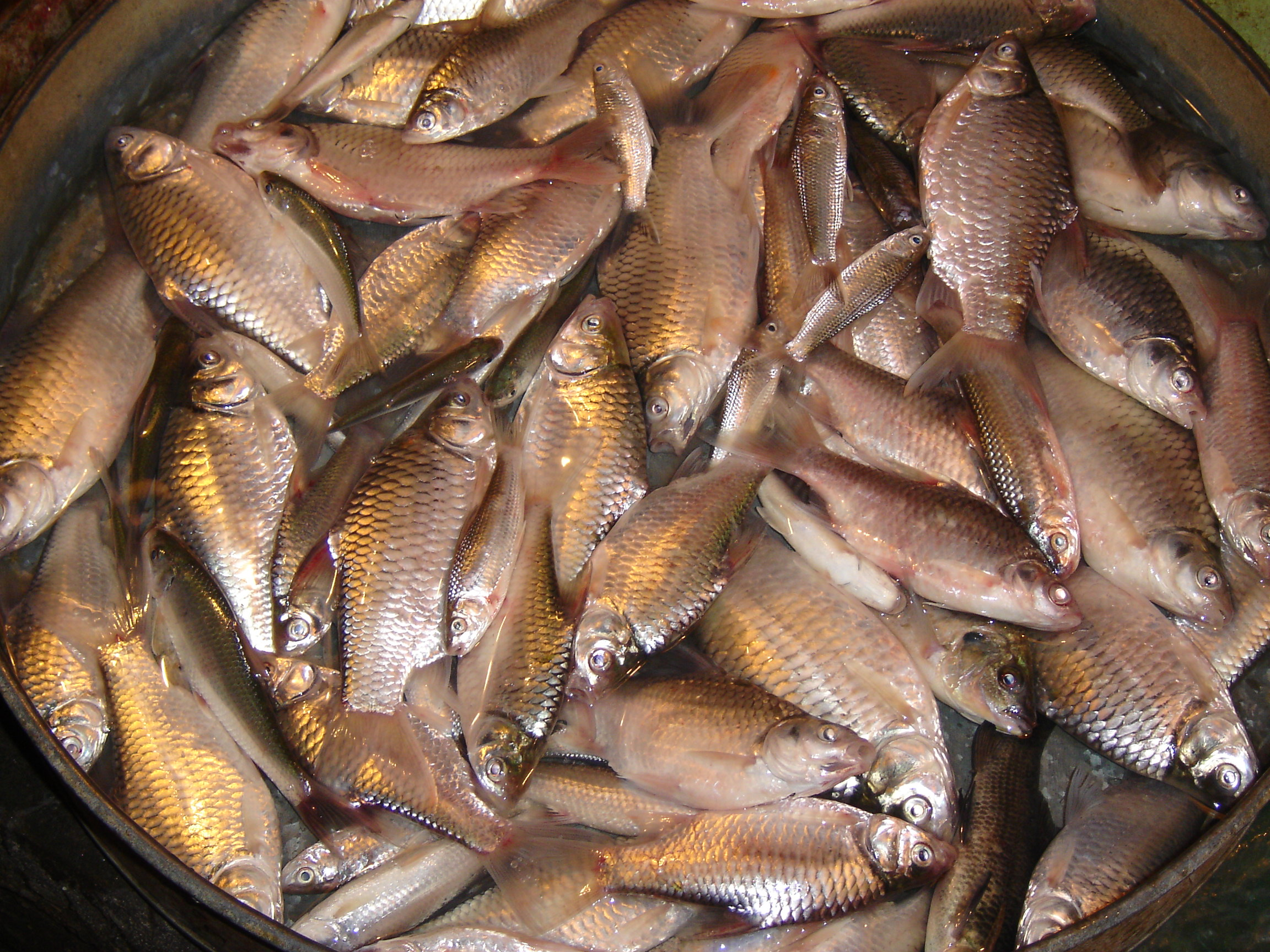

Scientific classification
- Kingdom: Animalia
- Phylum: Chordata
- Class: Actinopterygii
- Order: Cypriniformes
- Family: Cyprinidae
- Subfamily: Cyprininae
- Hybrid: Cyprinus carpio × Carassius auratus

Synonyms
- Carpio kollarii (Heckel, 1836)

= Kollar carp =

Hybrid fish

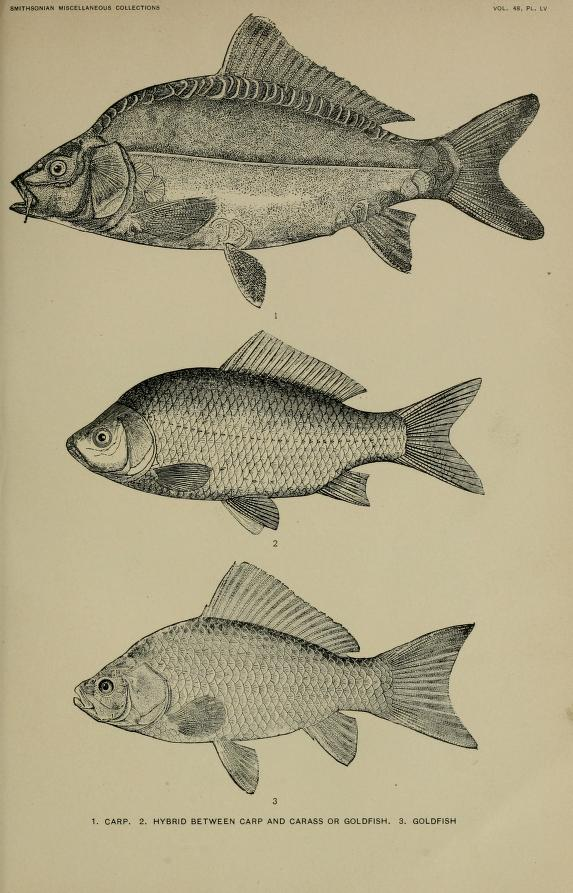
These drawings compare the Kollar carp (center) to the Eurasian carp (Cyprinus carpio, top) and the goldfish (Carassius auratus, bottom).

The Kollar carp (Cyprinus carpio x Carassius auratus) is a hybrid fish obtained by crossing common carp (Cyprinus carpio) and goldfish (Carassius auratus). Described by the Austrian zoologist Johann Jacob Heckel, its common name pays tribute to his compatriot, entomologist Vincenz Kollar. Although this carp is most often found in fish farms, they have also been recorded from the wild.

== Diet ==
The Kollar Carp has a wide variety of diet options. It includes aquatic plants, insects, and smaller fish. This type of diet makes it an omnivore and a benthic feeder. It does have pharyngeal teeth which resemble human molars and therefore help with being able to consume smaller fish, and insects.
