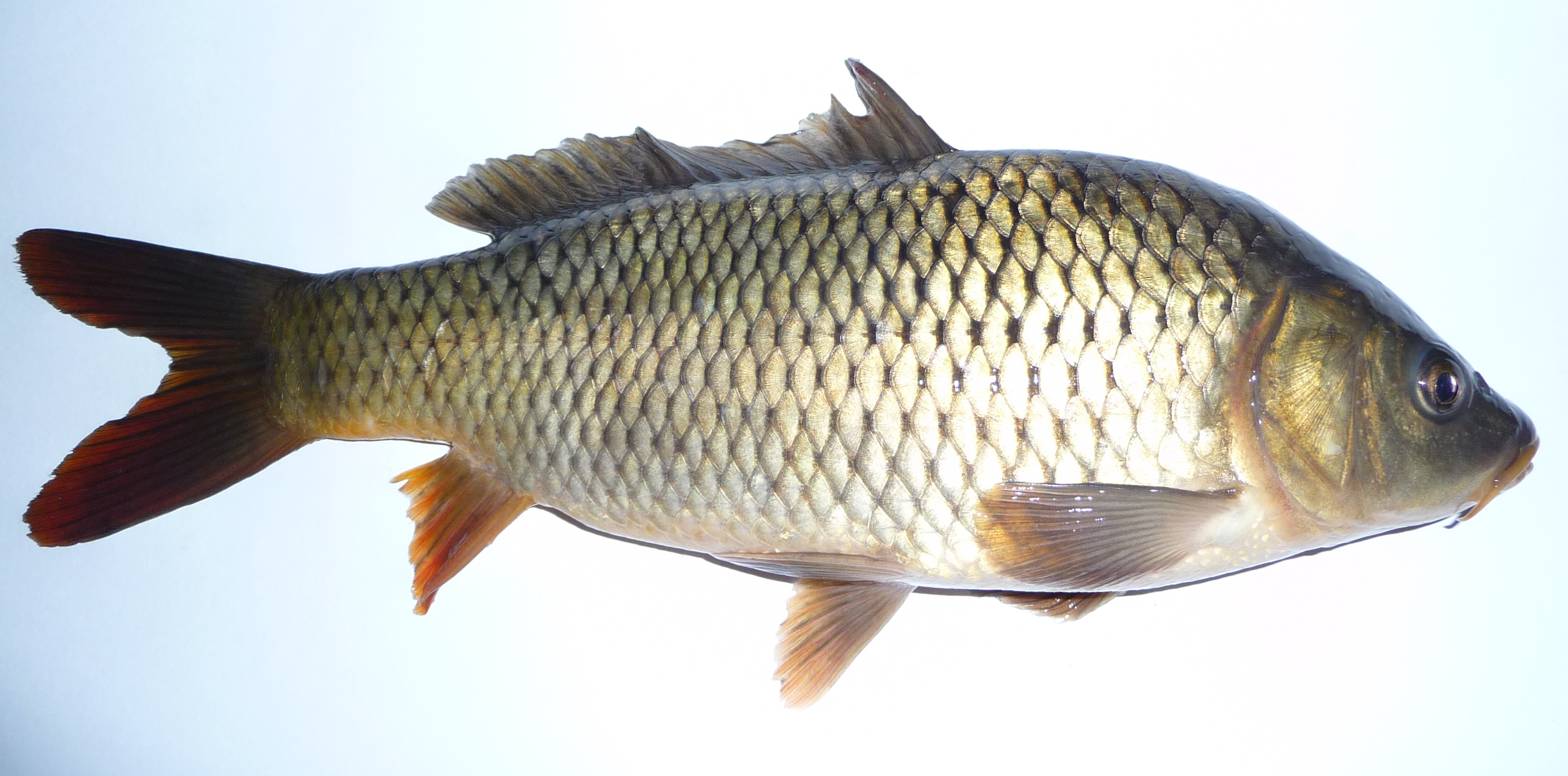

Conservation status
- Least Concern (IUCN 3.1)

- Secure (NatureServe)

Scientific classification
- Kingdom: Animalia
- Phylum: Chordata
- Class: Actinopterygii
- Division: Teleostei
- Order: Cypriniformes
- Family: Cyprinidae
- Subfamily: Cyprininae
- Genus: Cyprinus
- Species: C. carpio

Binomial name
- Cyprinus carpio Linnaeus, 1758
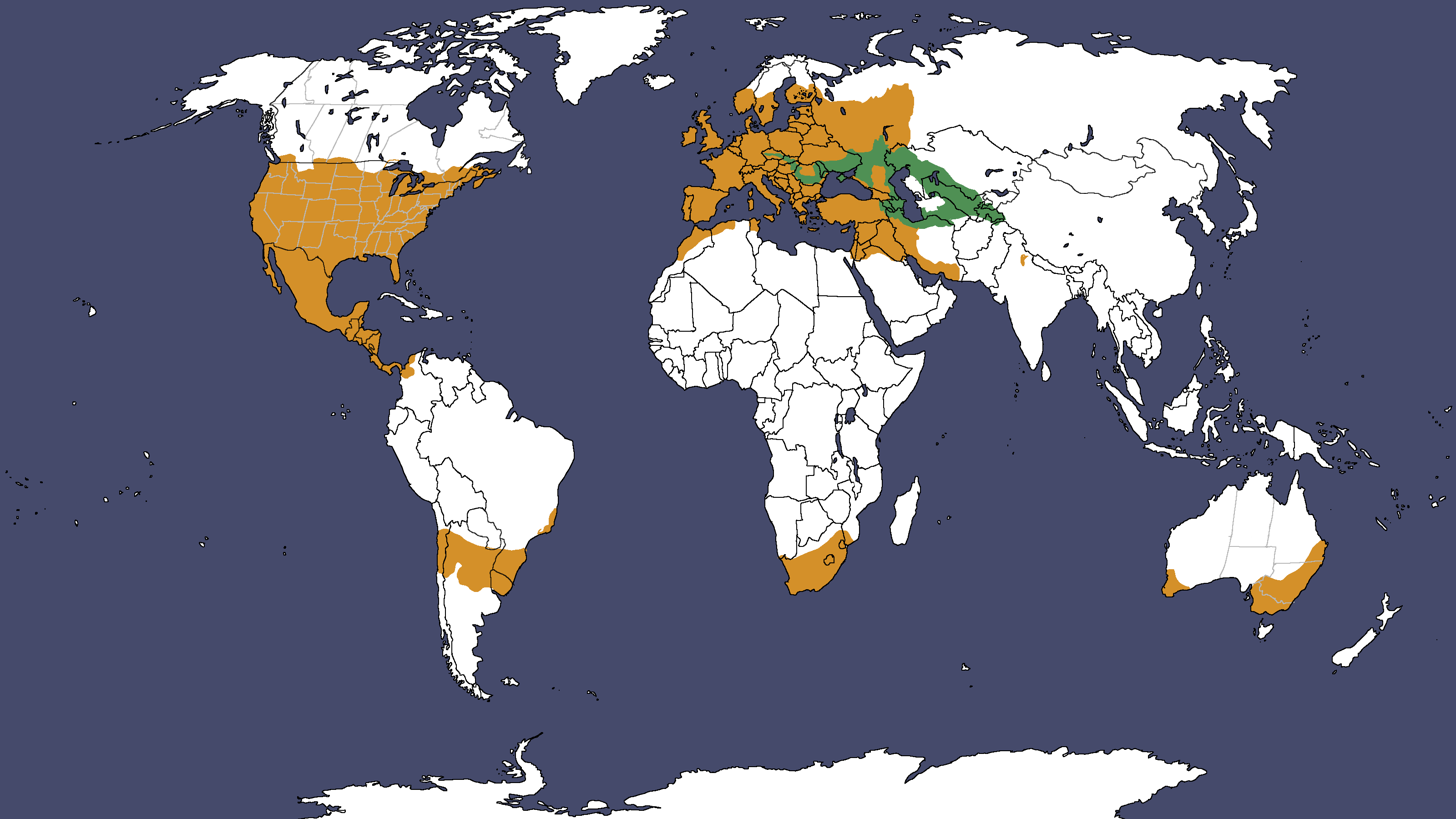
- native range introduced range

= Common carp =

Species of fish

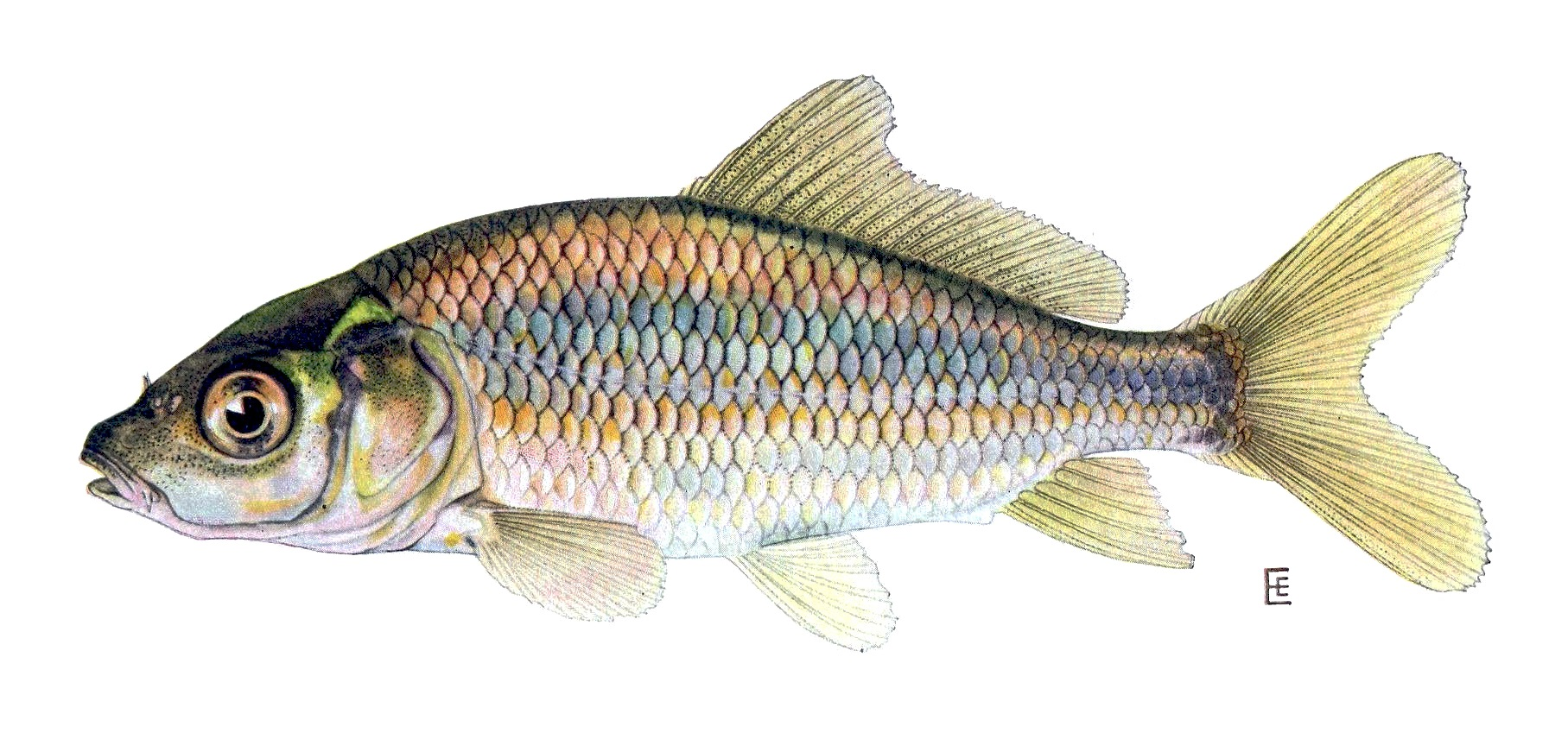
Painting by Ellen Edmonson

The common carp (Cyprinus carpio), also known as European carp, Eurasian carp, or simply carp, is a widespread freshwater fish of eutrophic waters in lakes and large rivers in Europe and Asia. The native wild populations are considered vulnerable to extinction by the International Union for Conservation of Nature (IUCN), but the species has also been domesticated and introduced (see aquaculture) into environments worldwide, and is often considered an invasive species, being included in the list of the world's 100 worst invasive species. It gives its name to the carp family, Cyprinidae.

== Taxonomy ==
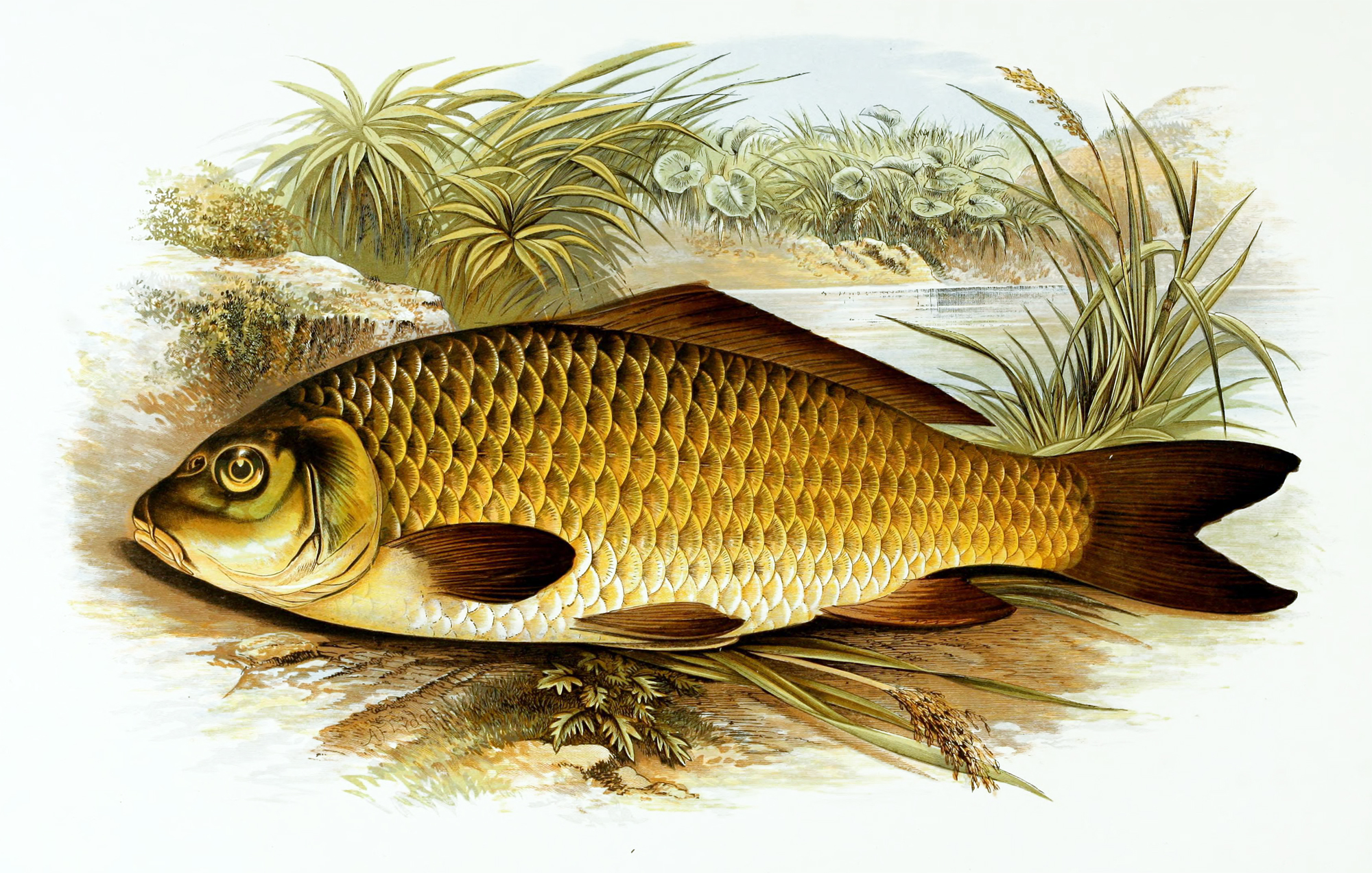
Common carp by Alexander Francis Lydon

The type subspecies is Cyprinus carpio carpio, native to much of Europe (notably the Danube and Volga Rivers).

The subspecies Cyprinus carpio haematopterus (Amur carp), native to eastern Asia, was recognized in the past, but recent authorities treat it as a separate species under the name Cyprinus rubrofuscus. The common carp and various Asian relatives in their pure forms can be separated by meristics and also differ in genetics, but they are able to interbreed. Common carp can also interbreed with the goldfish (Carassius auratus); the result is called Kollar carp. Another artificial hybrid is ghost carp, which is bred between common carp and Japanese Purachina koi. The large variations of colours produced make ghost carp a popular commercial species.

== History ==
The common carp is native to Europe and Asia, and has been introduced to every part of the world except the poles. They are the third-most frequently introduced fish species worldwide, and their history as a farmed fish dates back to Roman times. Carp are used as food in many areas, but are also regarded as a pest in several regions due to their ability to out-compete native fish stocks. The original common carp was found in the inland delta of the Danube River about 2000 years ago and was torpedo-shaped and golden-yellow in colour. It had two pairs of barbels and a mesh-like scale pattern. Although this fish was initially kept as an exploited captive, it was later maintained in large, specially built ponds by the Romans in south-central Europe (verified by the discovery of common carp remains in excavated settlements in the Danube Delta area). As aquaculture became a profitable branch of agriculture, efforts were made to farm the animals, and the culture systems soon included spawning and growing ponds. The common carp's native range also extends to the Black Sea, Caspian Sea, and Aral Sea.

Both European and Asian subspecies have been domesticated. In Europe, domestication of carp as food fish was spread by monks between the 13th and 16th centuries. The wild forms of carp had already reached the delta of the Rhine in the 12th century, probably with some human help. Variants that have arisen with domestication include the mirror carp, with large, mirror-like scales (linear mirror – scaleless except for a row of large scales that run along the lateral line; originating in Germany), the leather carp (virtually unscaled except near dorsal fin), and the fully scaled carp. Koi carp (錦鯉 (nishikigoi) in Japanese, 鯉魚 (pinyin: lĭ yú) in Chinese) is a domesticated ornamental variety that originated in the Niigata region of Japan in the 1820s, but its parent species is likely the East Asian carp, possibly C. rubrofuscus.

== Physiology and life history ==
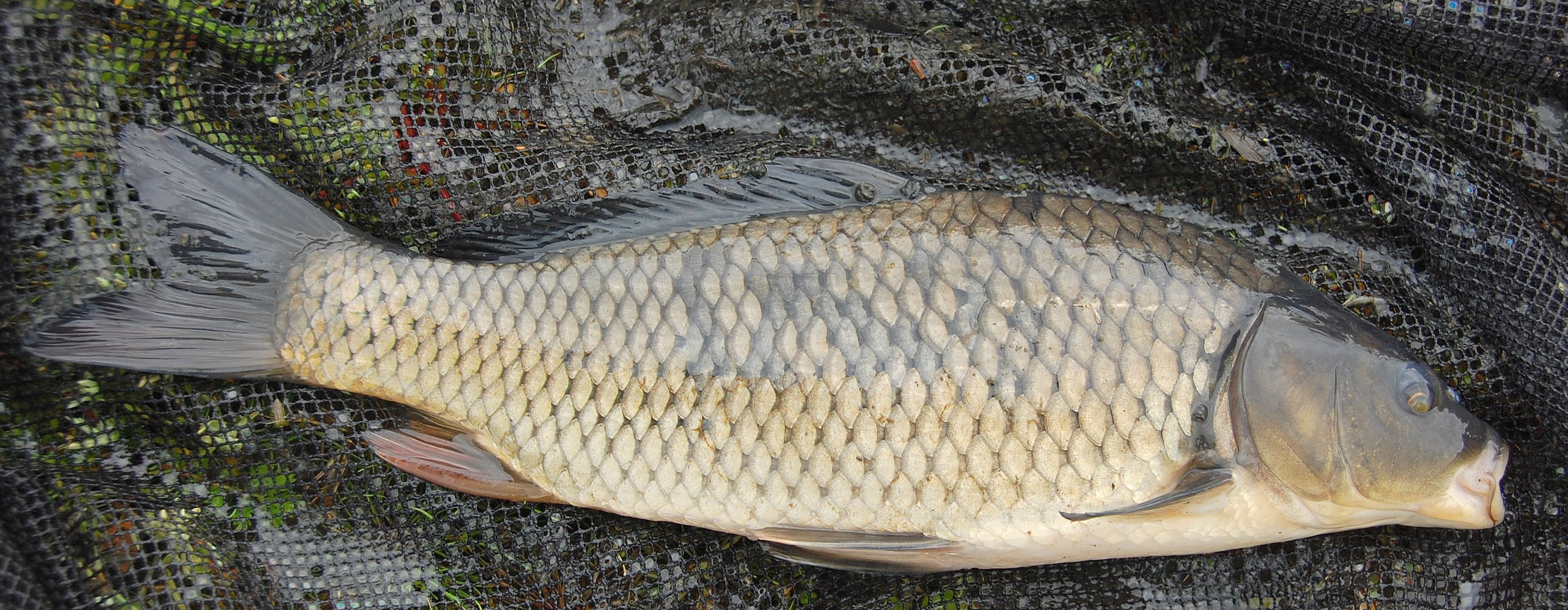
Dutch wild carp

The carp has a robust build, with a dark gold sheen that is most prominent on its head. Its body is adorned with large, conspicuous scales that are very shiny. It has large pectoral fins and a tapering dorsal fin running down the last two-thirds of its body, getting progressively higher as it nears the carp's head. Its caudal and anal fins may either be a dark bronze or washed with a rubbery orange hue. Two or three spines are on the anal fin, the first being serrated, and the dorsal fin has three or four anterior spines, the first of which is also serrated. The mouth of the carp is downward-turned, with two pairs of barbels, one pair at the corners of the upper lip, and the other on the lower. Wild common carp are typically slimmer than domesticated forms, with body length about four times body height, red flesh, and a forward-protruding mouth. Common carp can grow to very large sizes if given adequate space and nutrients. Their average growth rate by weight is about half the growth rate of domesticated carp. They do not reach the lengths and weights of domesticated carp, which (range, 3.2–4.8 times) can grow to a maximum length of 120 centimetres (47 in), a maximum weight of over 40 kilograms (88 lb). The longest-lived common carp documented was of wild-origin (in non-native habitat of North America), and was 64 years of age. The largest recorded carp, caught by British angler, Colin Smith, in 2013 at Etang La Saussaie Fishery, France, weighed 45.59 kilograms (100.5 lb). The average size of the common carp is around 40–80 cm (16–31 inches) and 2–14 kg (4.4–30.9 lb).

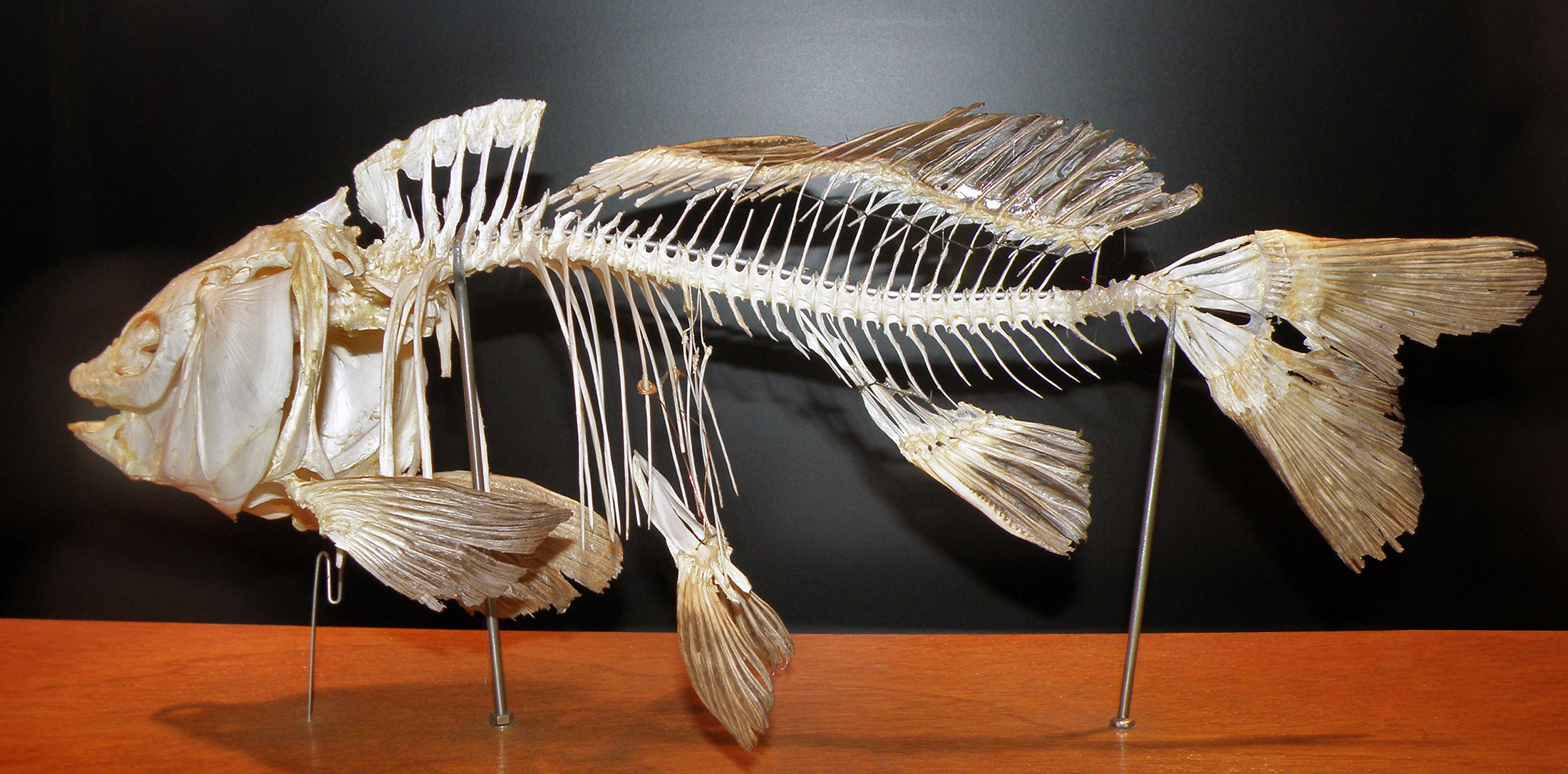
The skeleton of a European carp

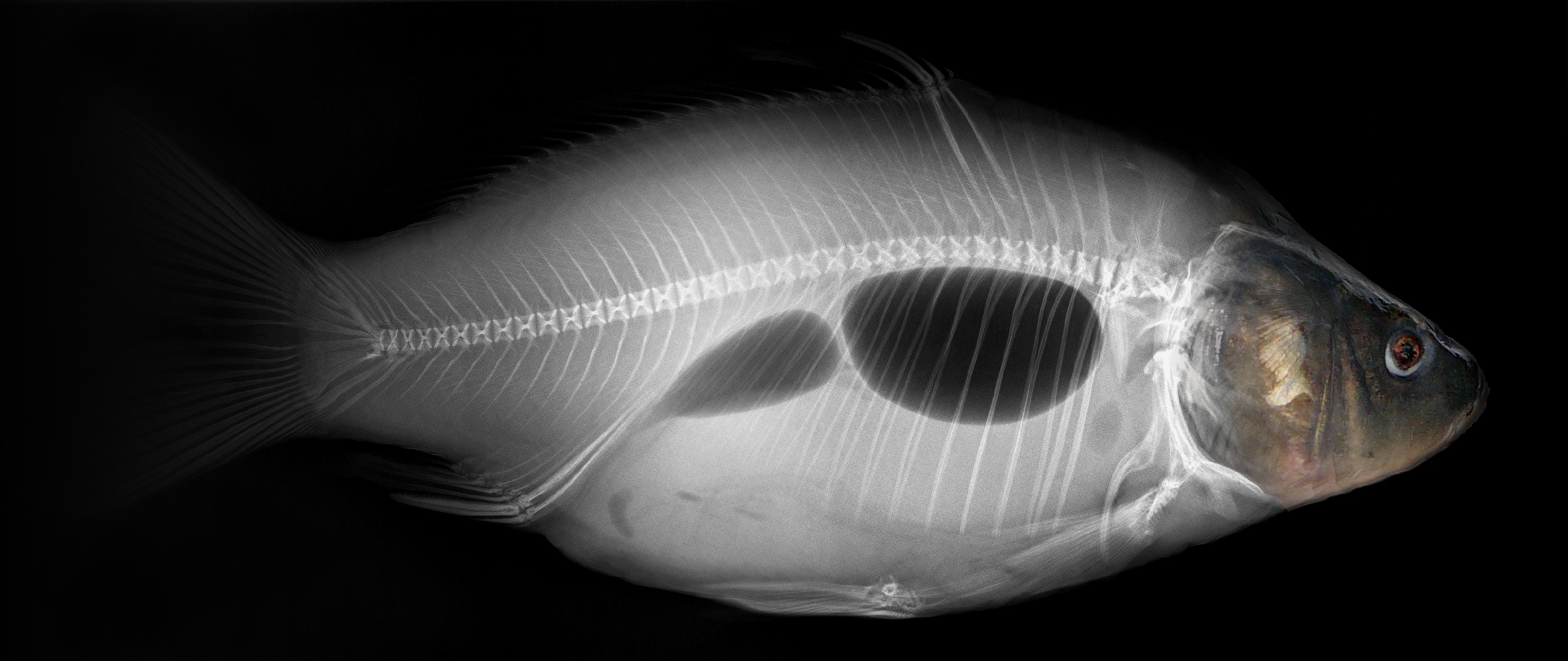
European carp x-ray

=== Habitat ===
Although tolerant of most conditions, common carp prefer large bodies of slow or standing water and soft, vegetative sediments. As schooling fish, they prefer to be in groups of five or more. They naturally live in temperate climates in fresh or slightly brackish water with a pH of 6.5–9.0 and salinity up to about 0.5%, and temperatures of 3 to 35 °C (37–95 °F). The ideal temperature is 23 to 30 °C (73–86 °F), with spawning beginning at 17 to 18 °C (63–64 °F); they easily survive winter in a frozen-over pond, as long as some free water remains below the ice. Carp are able to tolerate water with very low oxygen levels, by gulping air at the surface.

=== Diet ===
Common carp are omnivorous. They can eat a herbivorous diet of aquatic plants, plant tubers, and seeds, but prefer to scavenge the bottom for insects, crustaceans (including zooplankton and crawfish), molluscs, benthic worms, fish eggs, and fish remains. Common carp feed throughout the day, with the most intensive feeding at night and around sunrise.

=== Feeding mechanisms ===
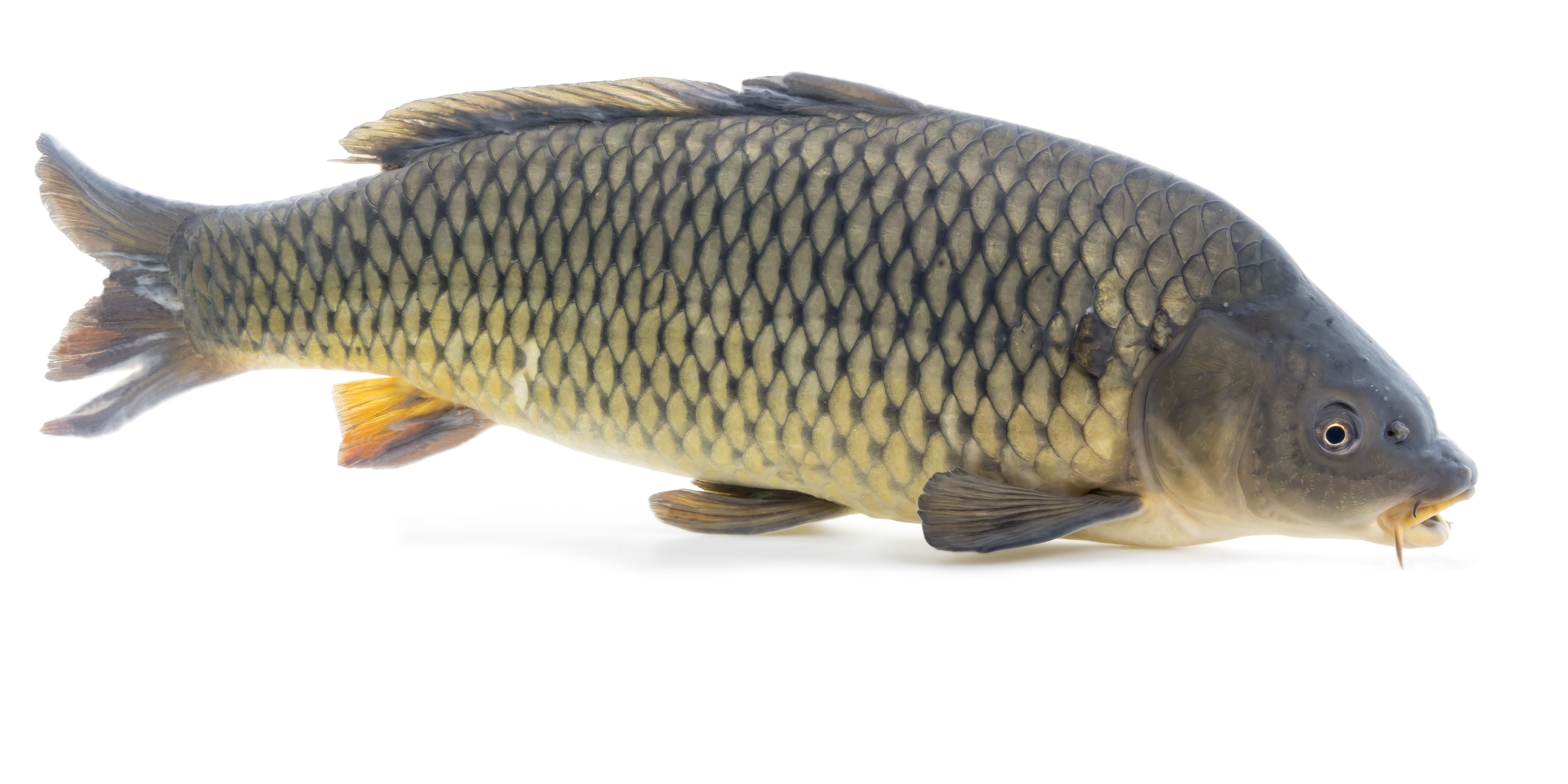
22 inch long common carp

Common carp are benthic feeders and root in sediment for food items. Their barbels may help to feel for food embedded in the sediment, like plant tubers or annelids. Carp pick up sediment by generating suction and mouth the content to identify and select food items by taste and size. Gill rakers form a branchial sieve that may aid in food separation, but the carp is also able to clamp down on food items it detects using a muscular palatal pad and inferior postlingual organ. The sediment is passed back and forth between the mouth and pharynx repeatedly as food is found. The carp may end up spitting out sediment, which contributes to water turbidity.

While common carp have no oral teeth, 10 pharyngeal teeth are used for crushing or grinding food. The carp has no stomach, and the intestinal length can vary based partially on dietary composition in early life.

=== Reproduction ===
An egg-layer, a typical adult female can lay 300,000 eggs in a single spawn. Although carp typically spawn in the spring, in response to rising water temperatures and rainfall, carp can spawn multiple times in a season. In commercial operations, spawning is often stimulated using a process called hypophysation, where lyophilized pituitary extract is injected into the fish. The pituitary extract contains gonadotropic hormones, which stimulate gonad maturation and sex steroid production, ultimately promoting reproduction.

=== Predation ===
A single carp can lay over a million eggs in a year. Eggs and fry often fall victim to bacteria, fungi, and the vast array of tiny predators in the pond environment. Carp that survive to the juvenile stage are preyed upon by other fish such as the northern pike and largemouth bass, and several birds (including cormorants, herons, goosanders, and ospreys) and mammals (including otter and mink).

=== Salinity ===
Common carp are quite salt tolerant compared to other types of freshwater fish, research studies showed that they can withstand salinity of at least 12 g/L (12 ppt).

== Mirror carp ==
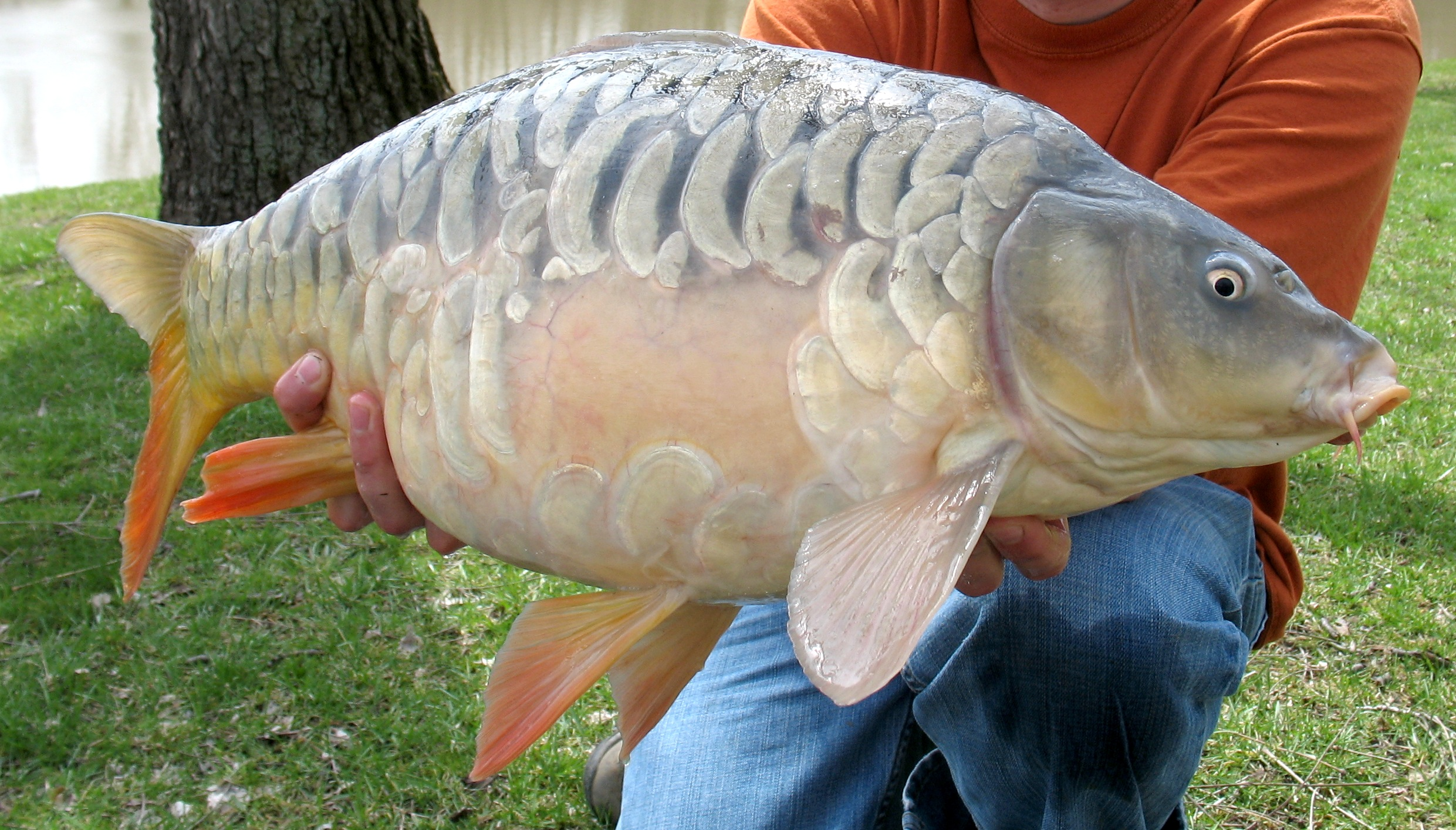
A 12 lb (5.4 kg) mirror carp

Mirror carp, regionally known as Israeli carp, (Note: This vernacular name most likely owes to the Israeli development of a mirror carp strain called "Dor-70" that has been widely exported, although these fish, introduced to the United States in the 1950s, are distinguishable from other fish called mirror carp according to Fishes of Arkansas.) are a type of domesticated fish commonly found in Europe but widely introduced or cultivated elsewhere. They are a variety of the common carp (Cyprinus carpio) developed through selective breeding. The name "mirror carp" originates from their scales' resemblance to mirrors.

=== Genetics ===
The most striking difference between mirror and common carp is the presence of large, mirror-like scales on the former. The mirror-scale phenotype is caused by a genetic mutation present at one of two scale trait loci, denoted by their S and N alleles, respectively. The genotype that produces a mirror scale phenotype is "ssnn" (all recessive), while wild-type carp may have either SSnn or Ssnn genotype. The "S" locus has been identified as containing the gene encoding fibroblast growth factor receptor Fgfr1A1, which was duplicated during the course of carp evolution and consequently does not typically produce lethal phenotypes when only one locus is mutated. The "N" locus has not been identified, but is hypothesized to have bearing on the development of embryonic mesenchyme.

Contrary to popular belief, a leather carp is not always a mirror carp without scales. Similar to mirror carp, leather, or "nude" carp, are homozygous recessive at the "S" locus, but unlike mirror carp, true leather carp are heterozygous for a dominant mutant allele at the "N" locus (ssNn genotype). (Note: Homozygosity for the dominant "N" allele is lethal. Heterozygosity reduces viability.) Leather carp also have reduced numbers of red blood cells and slower growth rates than scaled carp. Mirror carp from Hungarian and Asian stocks have been observed to have fewer pharyngeal teeth than scaled carp, while nude carp had fewer still.

A population of mirror carp in Madagascar (there an invasive species) was found to have reverted to full scale cover after being introduced from France in the early twentieth century. The feral Malagasy carp still possessed large scales due to their mirror phenotype, but had increased scale coverage approaching that of wild-type carp. Hubert et al. (2016) found that the recessive allele at the "S" locus was still fixed in the population. They believe that the phenotypic reversion was due to compensation by quantitative trait loci as a result of a selective disadvantage for partial scaling in the wild, perhaps related to an impairment in parasite resistance.

== Introduction into other habitats ==
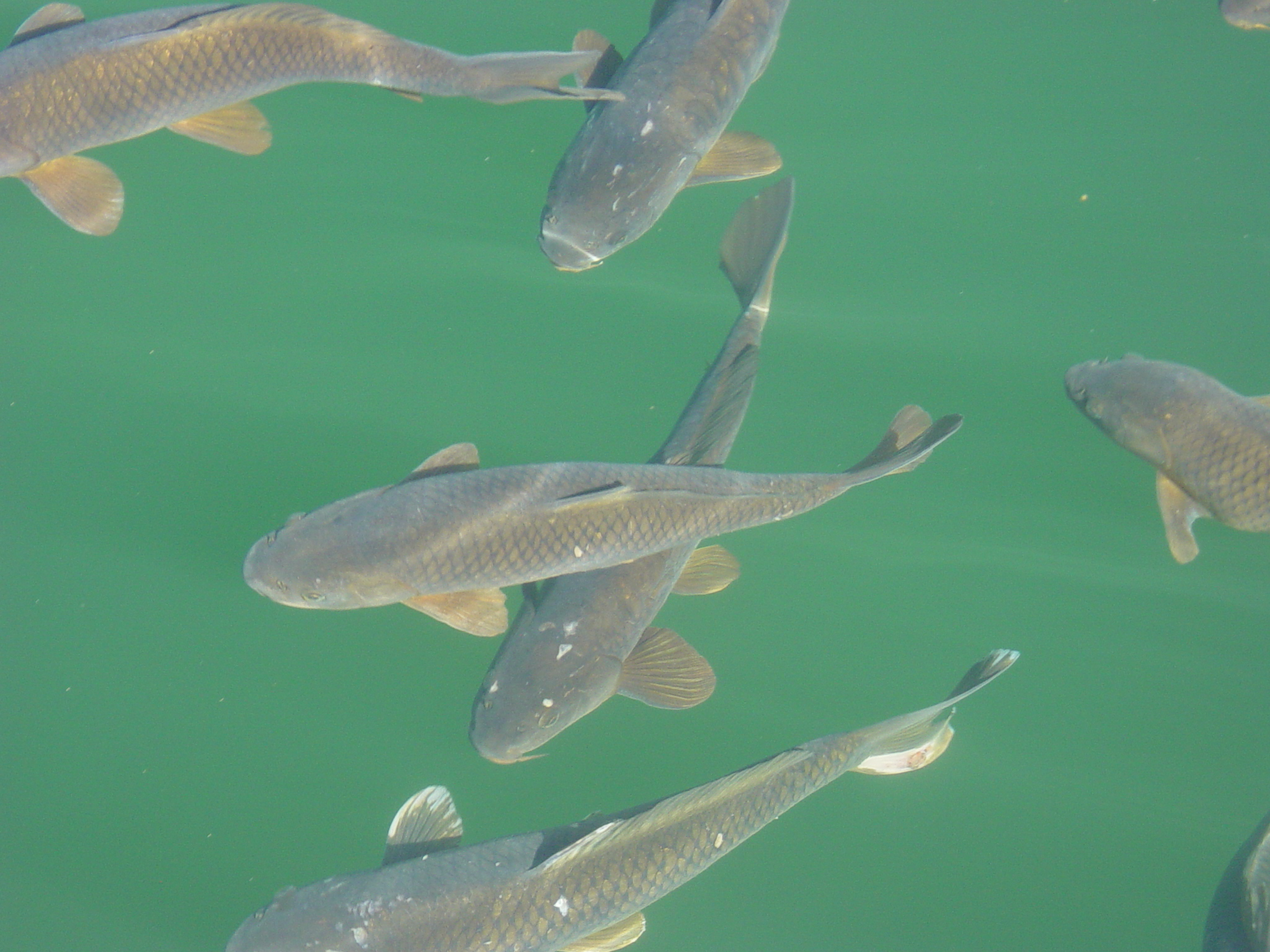
Carp in Lake Powell, Arizona

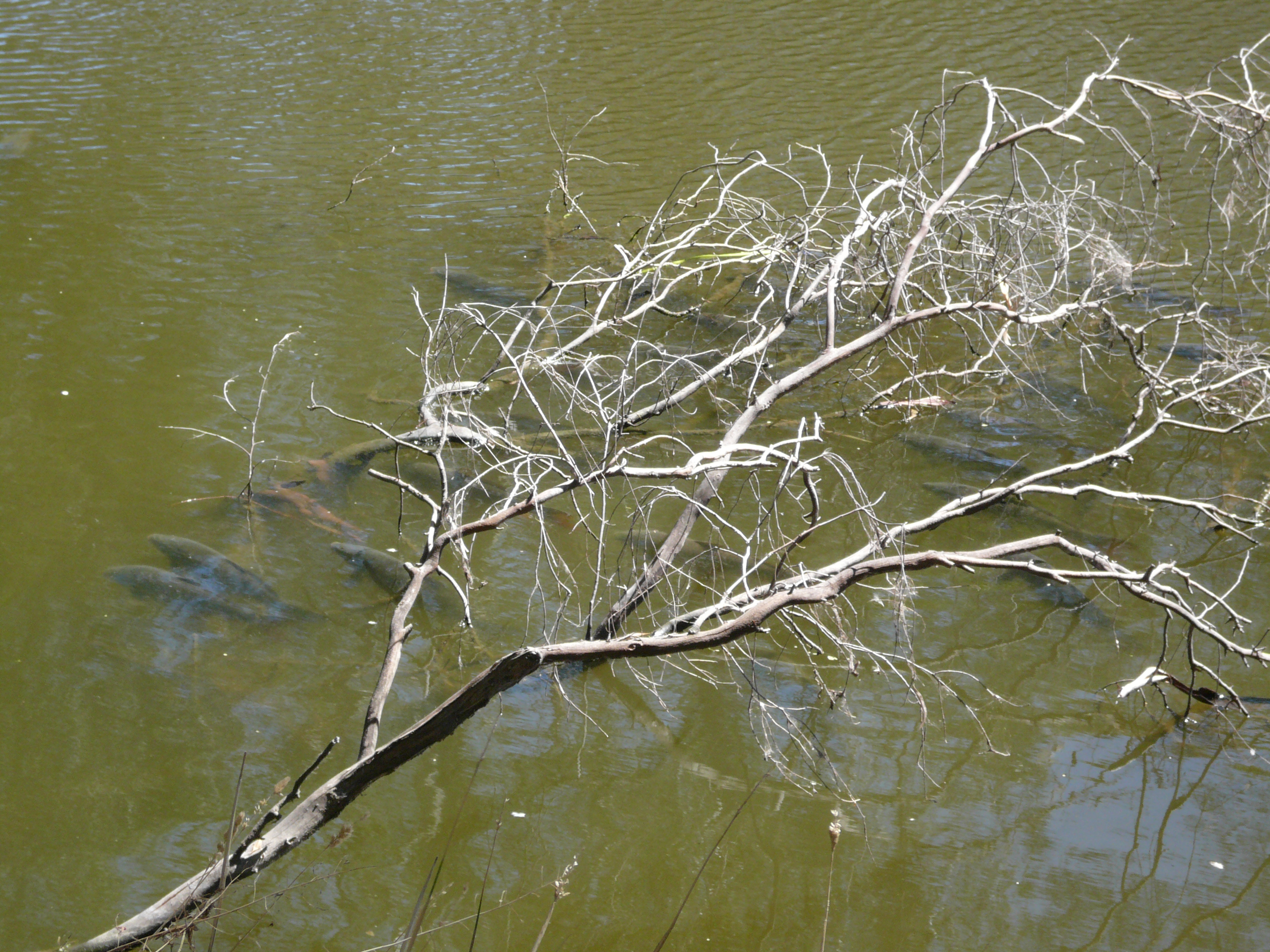
Carp in the Maribyrnong River, Australia

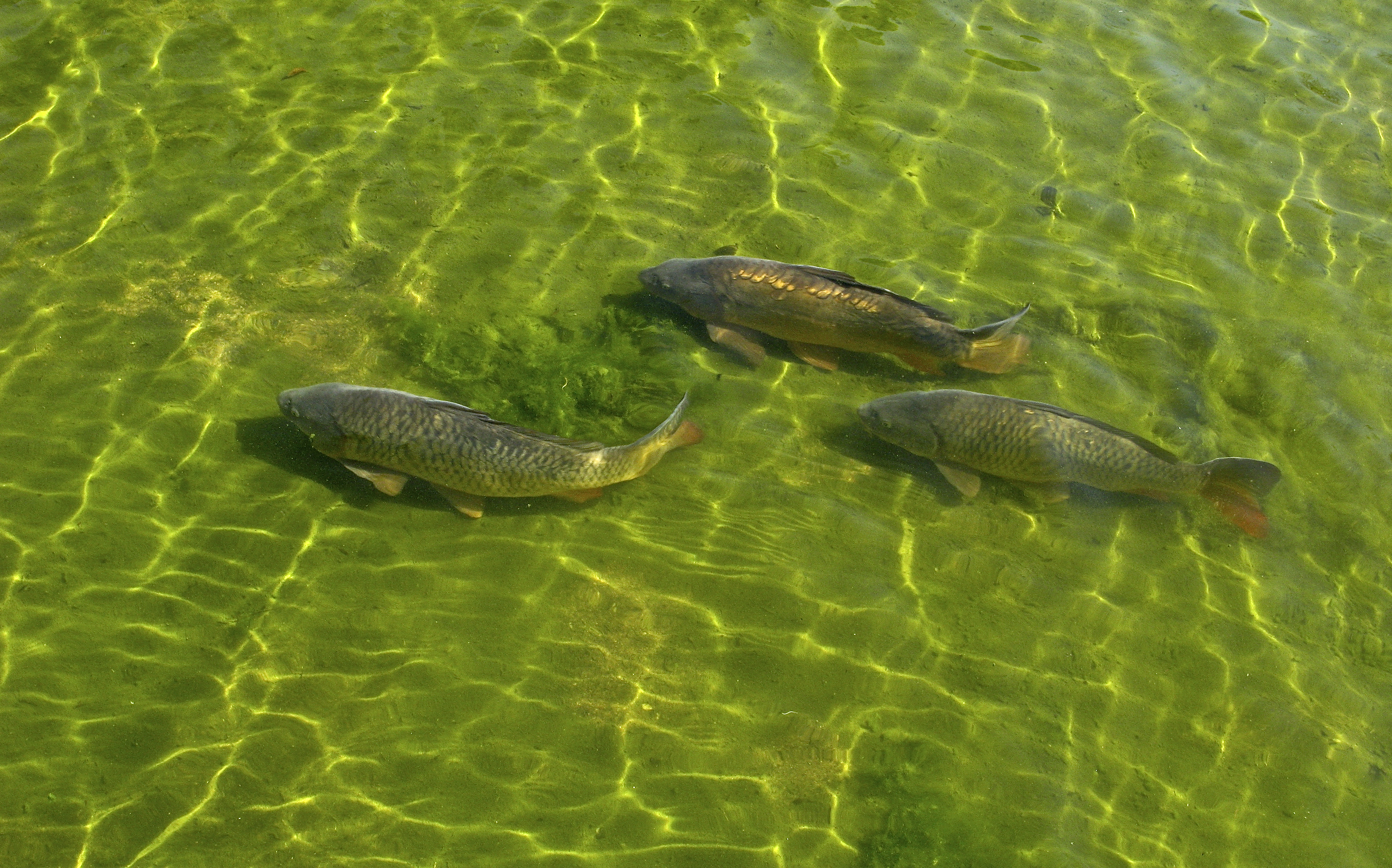
Carp in the duck pond in Herbert Park, Dublin, Ireland

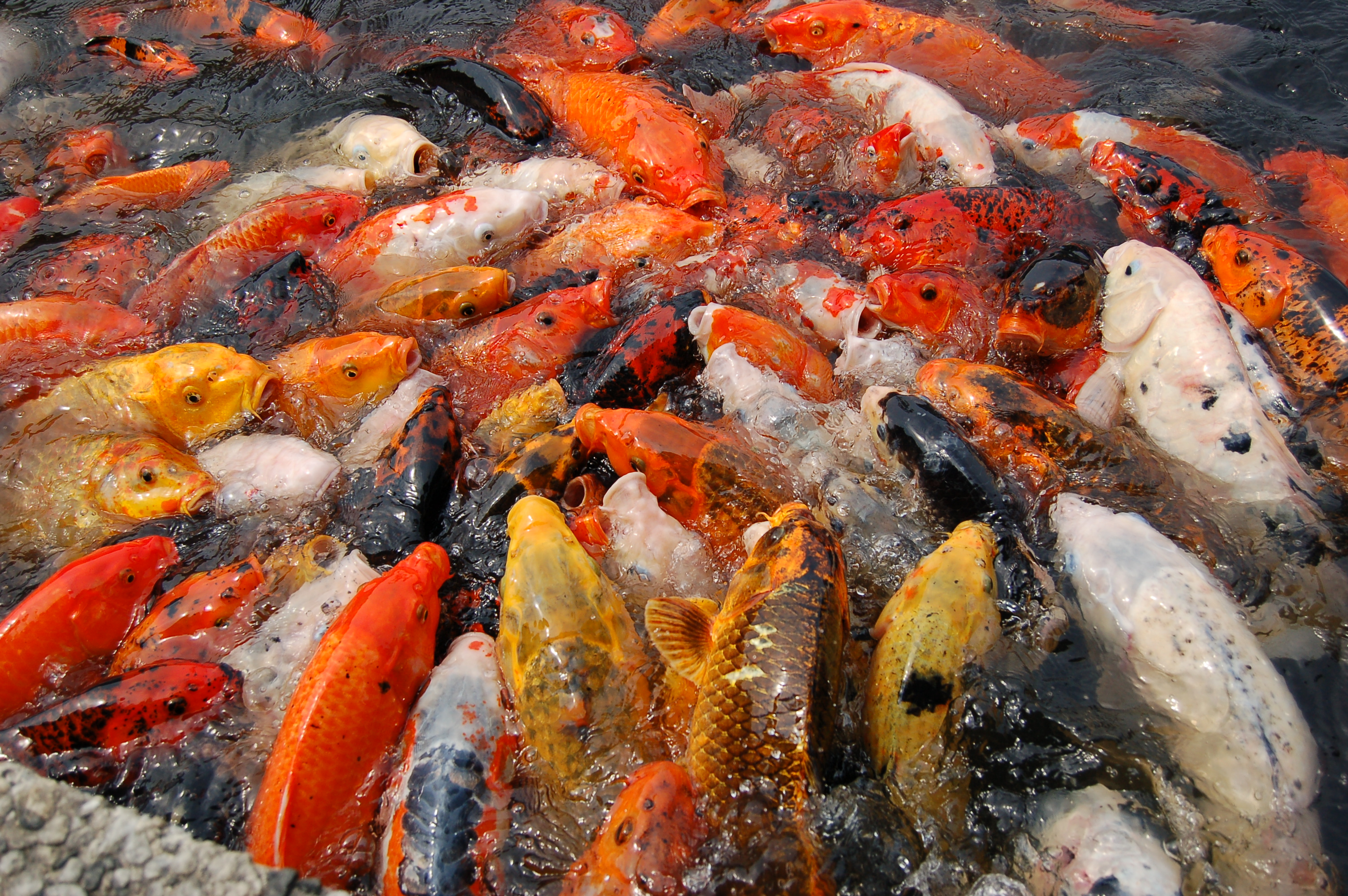
Koi feeding. The koi are ornamental varieties of domesticated carp and are kept in garden ponds. Although the koi's parent species has been considered the common carp, recent authorities believe it originates from an East Asian carp, possibly Cyprinus rubrofuscus.

Common carp have been introduced to most continents and some 59 countries. In absence of natural predators or commercial fishing, they may extensively alter their environments due to their reproductive rate and their feeding habit of grubbing through bottom sediments for food. In feeding, they may destroy, uproot, disturb and eat submerged vegetation, causing serious damage to food sources and habitats of native duck (such as canvasbacks) and fish populations.

In 2020, scientists demonstrated that a small proportion of fertilized common carp eggs ingested by waterfowl survive passing through the digestive tract and hatch after being retrieved from the feces. Birds exhibit strong preference for fish eggs, while cyprinids produce hundreds of thousands of eggs at a single spawning event. These data indicate that despite the low proportion of eggs surviving the digestive tract of birds, endozoochory might provide a potentially overlooked dispersal mechanism of invasive cyprinid fish. If proven under natural circumstances, endozoochorous dispersal of invasive fish could be a strong conservation concern for freshwater biodiversity.

=== Australia ===
Carp were introduced to Australia over 150 years ago but were not seen as a recognised pest species until the "Boolarra" strain escaped in the 1960s. After spreading throughout the Murray–Darling Basin, aided in part by massive flooding in 1974, but also potentially through interbreeding with carp strains already present, they have established themselves in every Australian state and territory except for the Northern Territory. In Victoria, the common carp was declared a noxious fish species in 1962, and the quantity a fisherman can take is unlimited. In South Australia, it is an offence for this species to be released back to the wild. An Australian company produces plant fertilizer from carp.

Efforts to eradicate a small colony from Lake Crescent in Tasmania, without using chemicals, have been successful, but the long-term, expensive and intensive undertaking is an example of both the possibility and difficulty of safely removing the species once it is established One controversial proposal, is to control common carp numbers by exposing them to the carp-specific koi herpes virus with its high mortality rate. In 2016, the Australian Government announced plans to release this virus into the Murray–Darling Basin in an attempt to reduce the number of invasive common carp. Much work has been undertaken on the potential for this approach as part of the National Carp Control Plan. However, the environmental safety and efficacy has been questioned. The CSIRO has previously investigated a technique for genetically modifying carp so that they only produce male offspring.

=== North America ===
Common carp were brought to the United States in 1831. In the late 19th century, they were distributed widely throughout the country by the government as a food fish, but they are now rarely eaten in the United States, where they are generally considered pests. As in Australia, their introduction has been shown to have negative environmental consequences.

In Utah, the common carp's population in Utah Lake is expected to be reduced by 75 percent by using nets to catch millions of them, and either giving them to people who will eat them or processing them into fertilizer. This, in turn, will give the declining population of the native June sucker a chance to recover. Another method of control is to trap them with seine nets in tributaries they use to spawn, and exposing them to the piscicide rotenone. This method has been shown to reduce their impact within 24 hours and greatly increase native vegetation and desirable fish species. It also allows native fish to prey more easily on young carp.

Common carp are thought to have been introduced into the Canadian province of British Columbia from the neighboring Washington state. They were first noted in the Okanagan Valley in 1912, as was their rapid growth in population. Carp are currently distributed in the lower Columbia (Arrow Lakes), lower Kootenay, Kettle (Christina Lake), and throughout the Okanagan system.

== Common carp aquaculture ==
Global aquaculture production of common carp (Cyprinus carpio) in million tonnes from 1950 to 2022, as reported by the FAO

Common carp contributed around 4.67 million tons on a global scale during 2015–2016, roughly accounting for 7.4% of the total global inland fisheries production. In Europe, common carp contributed 1.8% (0.17 Mt) of the total inland fisheries production (9.42 Mt) during 2015–2016. It is a major farmed species in European freshwater aquaculture with production localized in central and eastern European countries. The Russian Federation (0.06 Mt) followed by Poland (0.02 Mt), Czech Republic (0.02 Mt), Hungary (0.01 Mt) and Ukraine (0.01 Mt) represents about 70% of carp production in Europe during 2016. In fact, the land‐locked central European countries rely heavily on common carp aquaculture in fishponds. The average productivity of carp culture systems in central European countries ranges between 0.3 and 1 ton ha−1. The European common carp production, in terms of volume, reached its peak (0.18 Mt) during 2009–2010 and has been declining since. Carp farming is often criticized as an anthropogenic driver of eutrophication of inland freshwater bodies - especially in the Central Eastern European Region (CEER). There has been some debate between environmentalists and carp farmers concerning eutrophication of water bodies, manifested into lobbying at ministry levels surrounding fishpond legislations. European carp aquaculture in fish ponds most likely has a lower nutrient burden to the environment than most food production sectors in the European Union.

== As food and sport ==
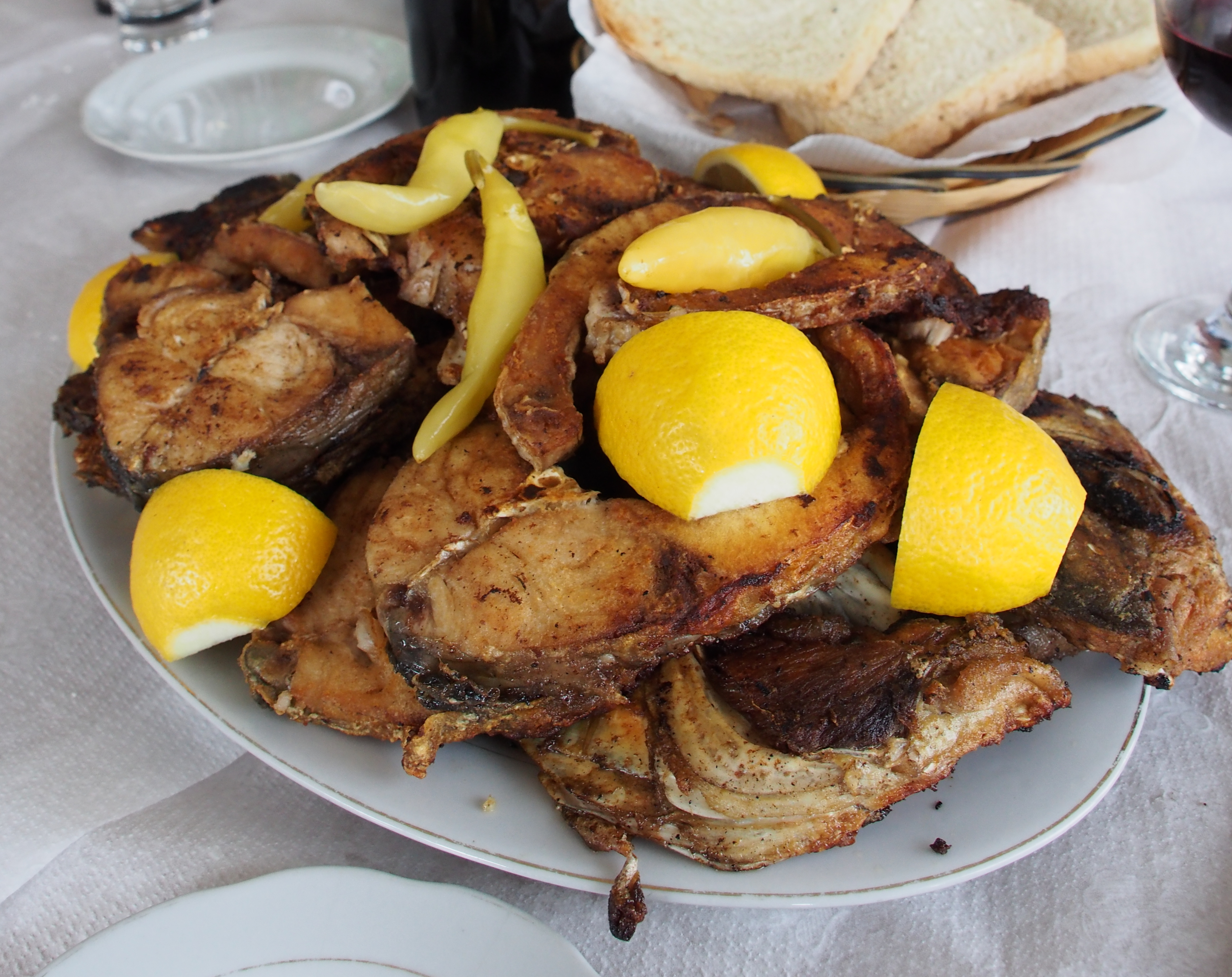
Lake Prespa carp, as served

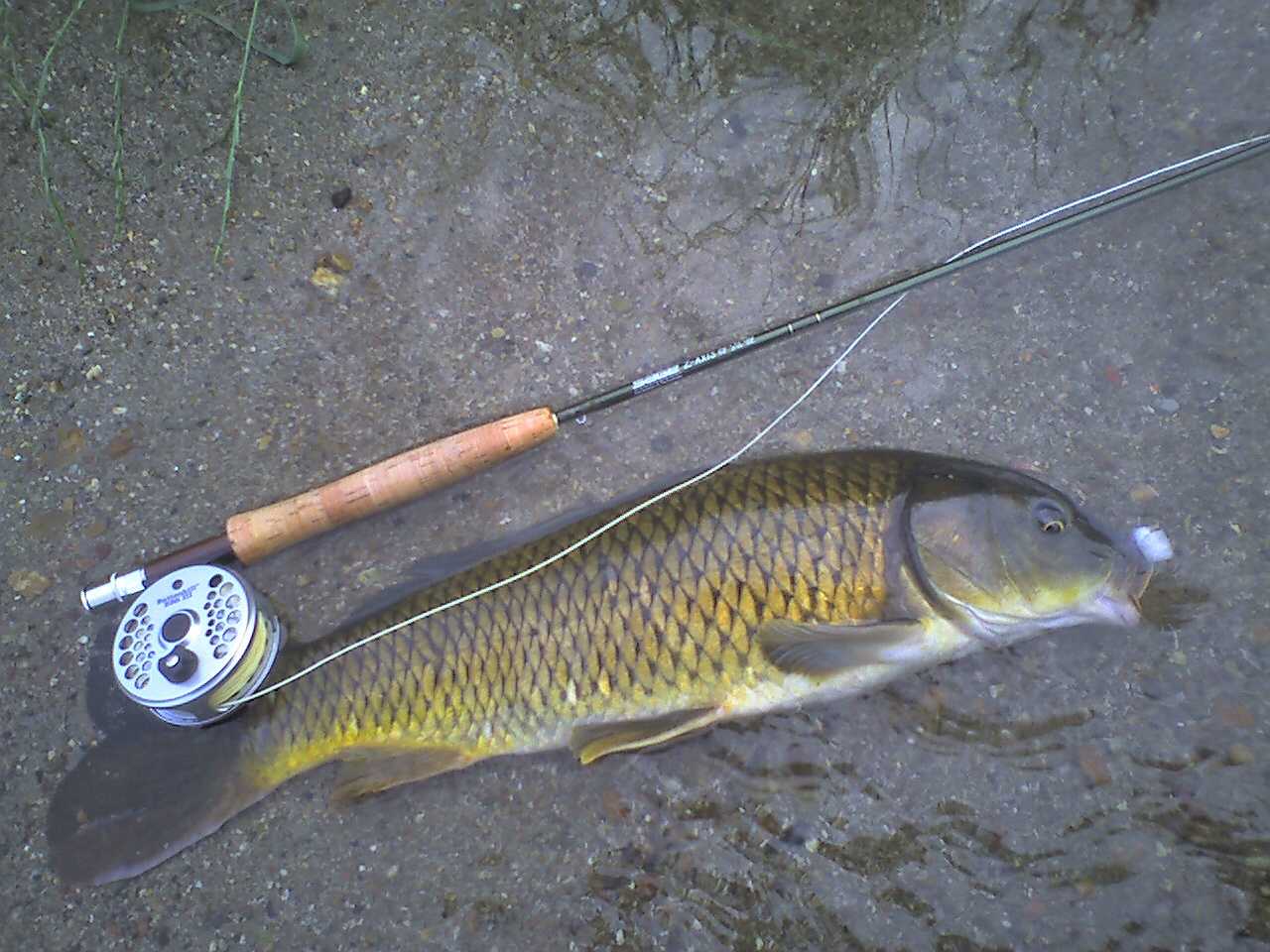
European carp caught with an artificial fly

=== Breeding and fishing ===
The Romans farmed carp and this pond culture continued through the monasteries of Europe and to this day. In China, Korea, and Japan, carp farming took place as early as the Yayoi period (c. 300 BC – AD 300).

The annual tonnage of common carp produced in China alone, not to mention the other cyprinids, exceeds the weight of all other fish, such as trout and salmon, produced by aquaculture worldwide. Roughly three million tonnes are produced annually, accounting for 14% of all farmed freshwater fish in 2002. China is by far the largest commercial producer, accounting for about 70% of carp production. Carp is eaten in many parts of the world both when caught from the wild and raised in aquaculture.

Common carp are extremely popular with anglers in many parts of Europe, and their popularity as quarry is slowly increasing among anglers in the United States (though they are still generally considered pests and destroyed in most areas of the U.S.), and southern Canada. Carp are also popular with spear, bow, and fly fishermen.

=== Food culture ===
In Central Europe, it is a traditional part of a Christmas Eve dinner. Hungarian fisherman's soup, a specially prepared fish soup of carp alone or mixed with other freshwater fish, is part of the traditional meal for Christmas Eve in Hungary along with stuffed cabbage and poppy seed roll and walnut roll. A traditional Czech Christmas Eve dinner is a thick soup of carp's head and offal, fried carp meat (sometimes the meat is skinned and baked instead) with potato salad or boiled carp in black sauce. A Slovak Christmas Eve dinner is quite similar, with soup varying according to the region and fried carp as the main dish. Also in Austria, parts of Germany, and Poland, a fried carp is one of the traditional dishes on Christmas Eve. Carp are mixed with other common fish to make gefilte fish, popular in Jewish cuisine..

Carp is rich in collagen, an essential component for healthy joints. Among all fish, carp has a high collagen content. Unlike other animal products, which are hard to digest, carp is gentle on our digestive system. In 100 grams of carp, there are only about 100 calories, and the unsaturated omega-3 fatty acids it contains protect the heart, circulatory system, and brain, lower levels of bad cholesterol, and have anti-cancer effects. Nutritionists also emphasize that carp protein can successfully replace beef or pork, is easily digestible, and is recommended even for people with stomach problems. Baking in the oven preserves all the health-promoting properties of carp and makes the dish lower in calories.

In Western Europe, the carp is cultivated more commonly as a sport fish, although there is a small market for it as a food fish.

In the United States, carp is mostly ignored as a food fish. Almost all U.S. shoppers bypass carp, due to a preference for filleted fish as opposed to cooking whole. Carp have smaller intramuscular bones called y-bones, which makes them a whole fish species for cooking.

When Eurasian Carp was introduced to Lake Toba in Sumatra, it was adapted to be used for the traditional dish Arsik.

== Gallery ==
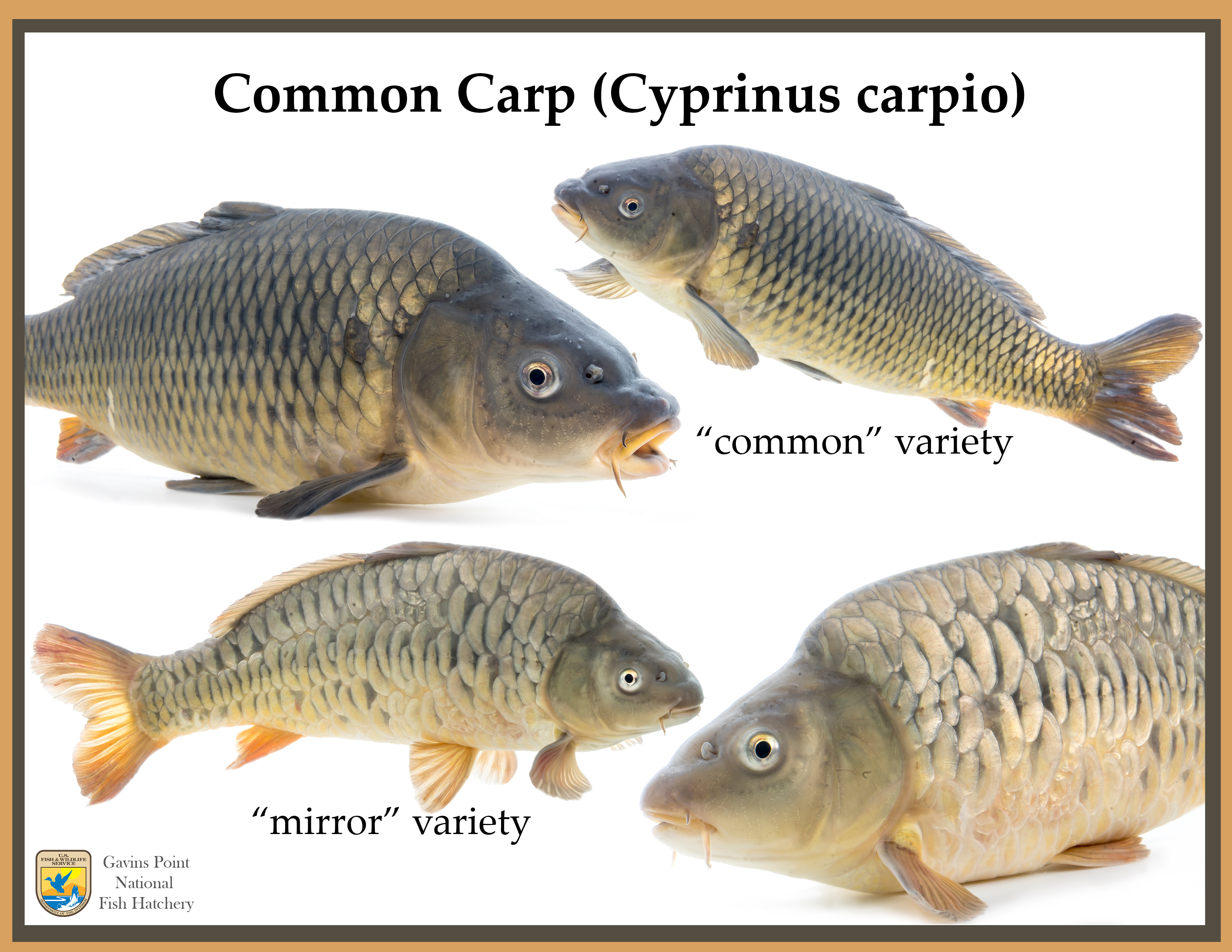

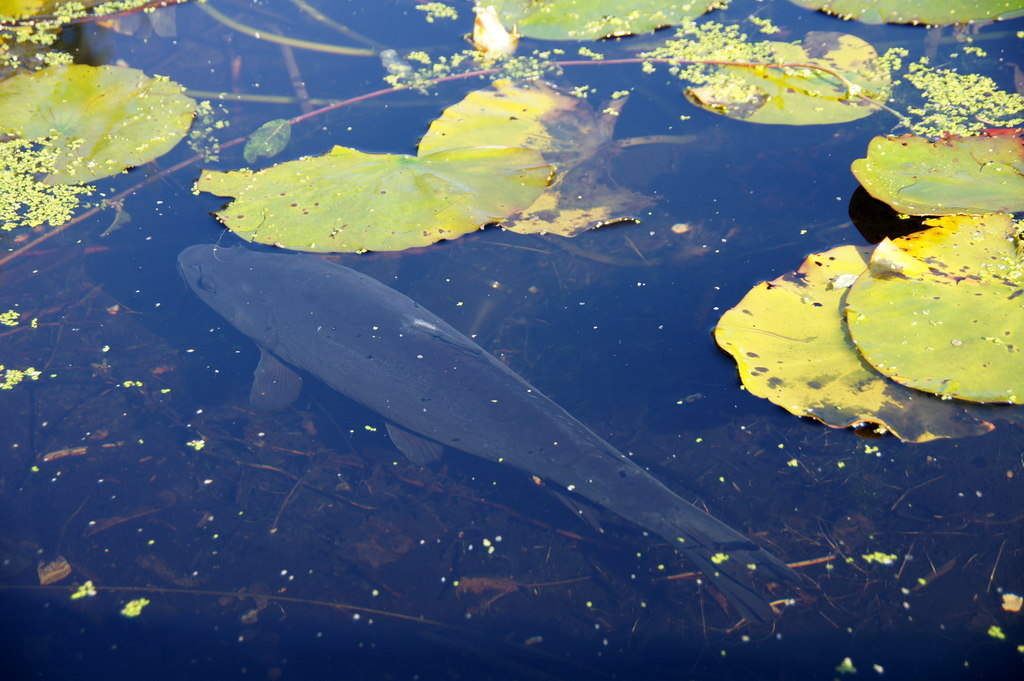

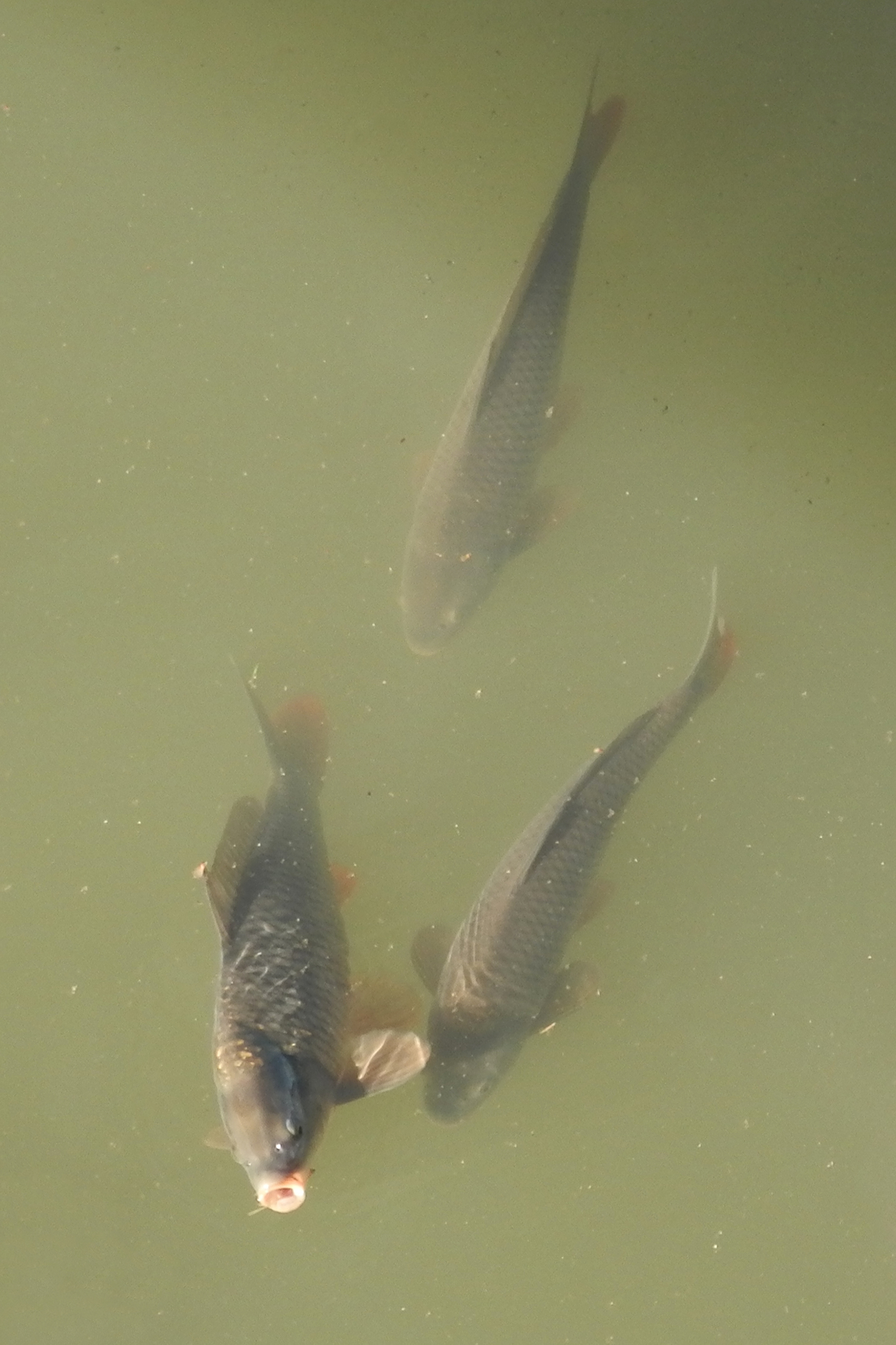

== See also ==
- List of freshwater aquarium fish species
- Japanese white crucian carp
- Rough fish
- Benson, a notable common carp
- Mud carp
