= Bluebell Arboretum =

Woodland garden in Derbyshire, England

Coordinates: 52.766°N 1.491°W

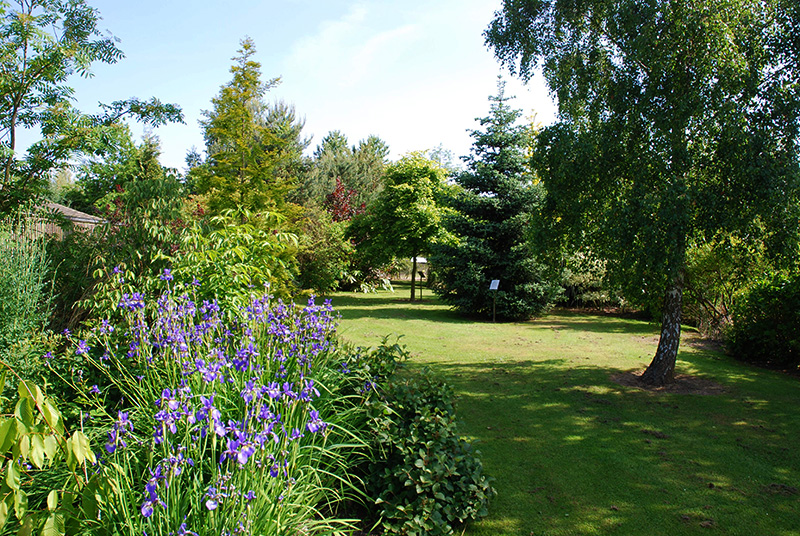
Bluebell Arboretum in Summer.

Bluebell Arboretum is an arboretum and associated plant nursery near the village of Smisby in South Derbyshire, England. It is a Royal Horticultural Society recommended garden, comprising a large selection of rare trees, shrubs and climbers growing in a woodland garden. Planting was started by the owners, Suzette and Robert Vernon (a Royal Horticultural Society committee member and Chelsea Flower Show judge) in 1992 on what was then a six acre (2.2 hectare) meadow, just under 500 feet (150 metres) above sea level. The arboretum was officially opened by Roy Lancaster, OBE VMH in 1997, and has since been expanded and is now open to the public throughout the year, excluding Sundays during the winter months.

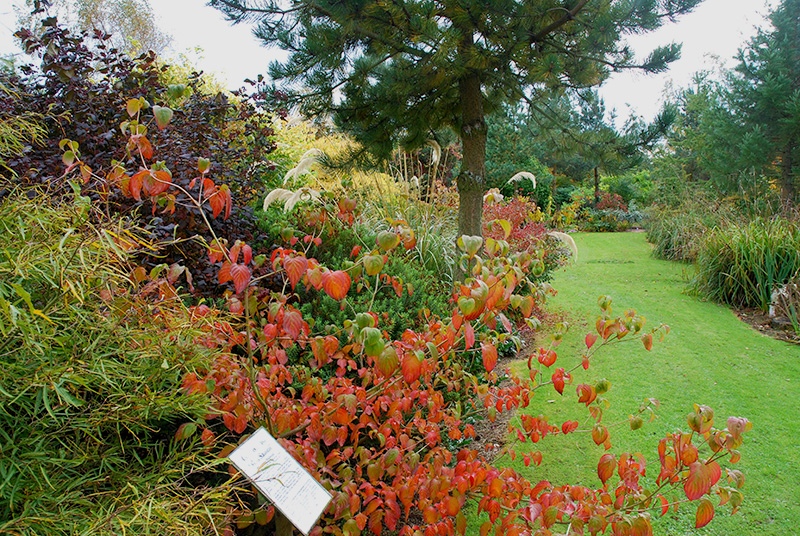
A4 information labels are prevalent throughout the Arboretum, such as can be seen below this Autumn colour.

In the garden emphasis is placed on its educational potential; its collection is extensive and well-labelled and there are many posters describing points of botanical/ecological interest, designed to stimulate further interest in trees, especially amongst younger visitors. The collection includes numerous species and cultivars from Northern Asia, North America and other temperate regions around the world; it includes cultivars of Cornus kousa (Chinese dogwood), Liquidambar styraciflua (American sweetgum), Liriodendron (tulip tree) and various Betula (birch) species, as well as other woody plants from many different genera.

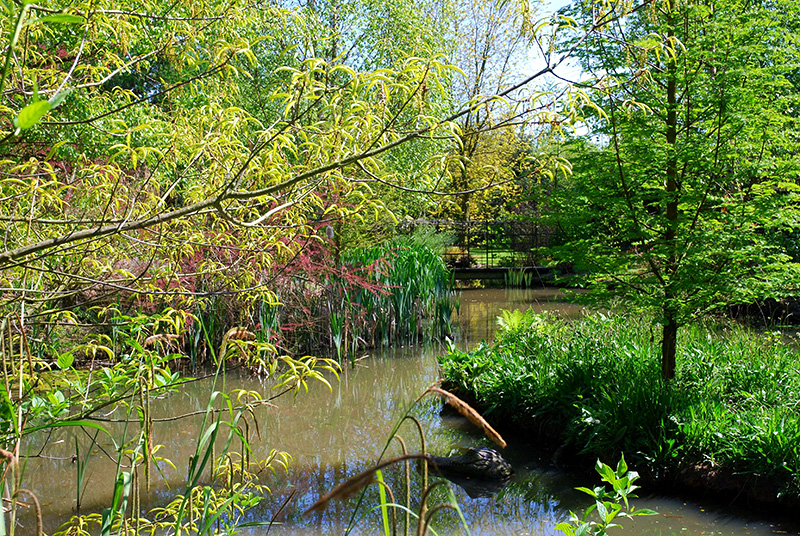
Springtime at Bluebell Arboretum.

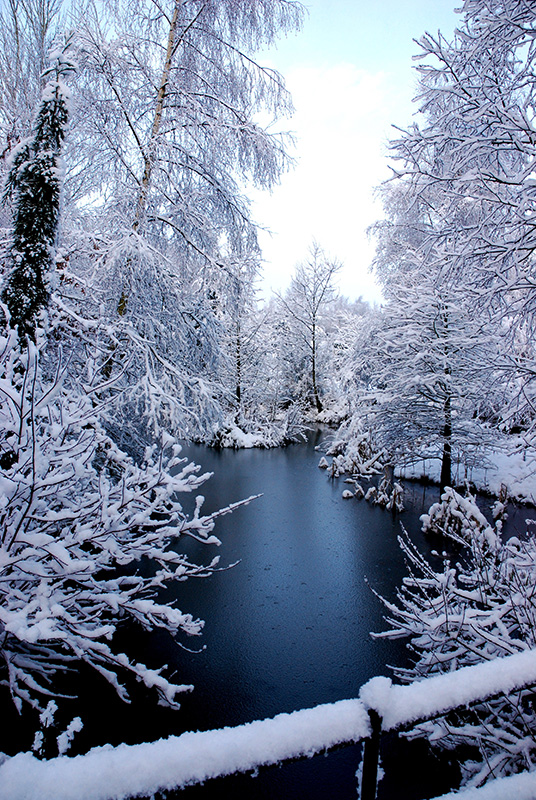
Winter trees at Bluebell Arboretum.

The arboretum includes a 2007 planting of 75 Sequoiadendron giganteum, the well-known giant redwood from the mountains of Southern California, and this area of the arboretum is intended to become a redwood grove in the future. Britain's first "Singing Sequoia" was commissioned in BlueBell Arboretum in spring, 2013; this automated musical and educational feature is amongst a group planting of Coastal Redwoods, which fully-grown in California are the tallest trees in the world. The aim of this planting is to create a small-scale representation of a Californian redwood forest, complete with sword ferns, 'Polystichum munitum', growing beneath the redwoods and skunk cabbages, 'Lysichiton americanus', in a nearby damp area.

In May 2004, the arboretum was given the 'Greenwatch Award' by Derbyshire County Council for Environmental Sustainability, and was featured for its autumn colour in October 2007 in the BBC's Gardeners' World. The arboretum also regularly holds open days for the National Gardens Scheme charity.
