= Deeper Fishfinder =

Fish sonar produced in Lithuania

Deeper Smart Sonar is a wireless, castable echo-sounder compatible with iOS and Android smartphones and tablets. Wi-Fi connection enabled to maximize both the distance between the sounder and the device holder up to 330 ft / 100 m and the depth range up to 260 ft / 80 m. The scanning frequency allows the device to capture fast-moving objects and the scanning resolution measures small objects.

== Usage ==
Deeper sonar can be cast to any spot in the water. While floating on the water surface it connects to a smart device and transmits information which is used for finding fish, getting depth information, exploring bottom contour and vegetation, and temperature.

== Operation ==
Operation of Deeper is based on echolocation and wi-fi technologies. Echolocation is a method for detecting and locating objects submerged in water. When a sound signal is produced, the time it takes for the signal to reach an object and for its echo to return is issued to calculate the distance between the sonar and the object. Wi-Fi allows transference of the sonar readings to a smartphone or tablet from up to 330 ft / 100 meters.

== Technical specifications ==
Deeper sonar can be cast from varying heights and positions.

Technical specifications
Size	2.5 in / 65 mm diameter
Weight	3.5oz /100 g
Construction	ABS
Compatibility	From iOS 8.0 and Android 4.0 to the latest iOS and Android devices as of November 2015
Connection	Wi-fi
Wi-fi range	Up to 330 ft / 100 meters. Depends on the OS and smartphone model
Depth range	2 ft (0.5 m) to 260 ft (80 m)
Operational temperature	-4F to 104F/ -20C to 40C
Sonar type	Dual beam
Frequency & (cone)	290 kHz (15°) / 90 kHz (55°)
Internal battery	Lithium polymer, 3.7V rechargeable, 850mAh
Power supply	Micro USB B type, 5V DC, 450mA max

== App ==
Deeper app is compatible with iOS 8.0 and Android 4.0 to the latest iOS and Android devices as of November 2015. Features:

- Real-time mapping & offline maps
- Unlimited data history
- Ice fishing mode
- Solunar calendar, notes, camera, social media sharing
- Sleep feature to pause battery use when in water (low power-consumption mode)

== See also ==
- Fishfinder
