= HMS Bluebell =

Two ships of the British Royal Navy have been named HMS Bluebell, after the bluebell flower.

- HMS Bluebell (1915) was an Acacia-class sloop in service from 1915 to 1930.
- HMS Bluebell (K80) was a Flower-class corvette launched in 1940 and sunk by a torpedo in 1945.
