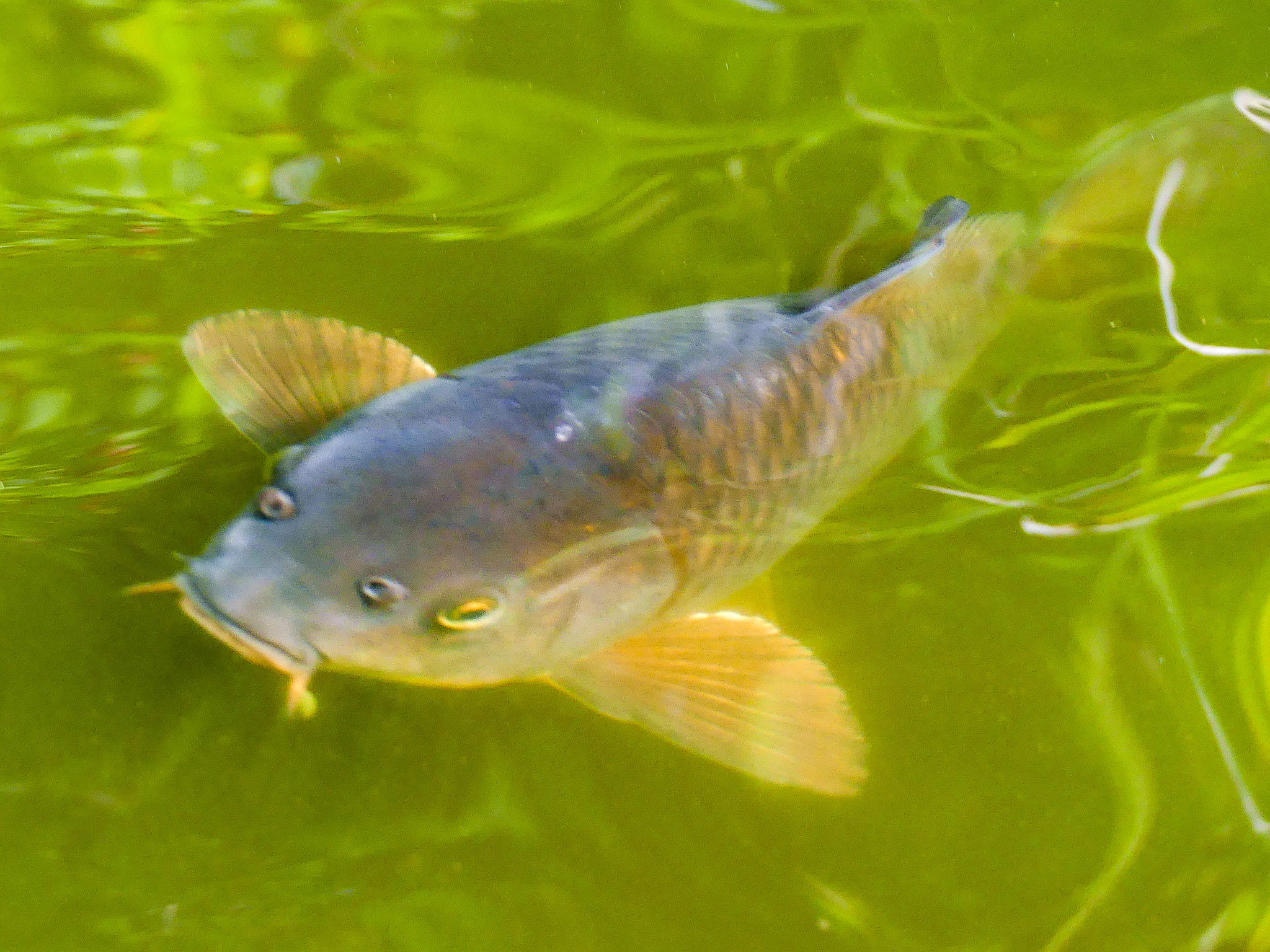

Conservation status
- Least Concern (IUCN 3.1)

Scientific classification
- Kingdom: Animalia
- Phylum: Chordata
- Class: Actinopterygii
- Division: Teleostei
- Order: Cypriniformes
- Family: Cyprinidae
- Genus: Cyprinus
- Species: C. rubrofuscus

Binomial name
- Cyprinus rubrofuscus Lacépède, 1803

Synonyms
- Cyprinus carpio haematopterus Temminck & Schlegel, 1846; Cyprinus viridiviolaceus Lacépède, 1803

= Cyprinus rubrofuscus =

Species of Cyprinid fish

Cyprinus rubrofuscus, or the Amur carp, is a species of freshwater fish belonging to the Cyprinidae family. It is the ancestral form of some domesticated koi fish, which are well known for their striking colors as an ornamental species. Often mistaken for the common carp (Cyprinus carpio), the species originated in eastern Asia but has since been widely distributed and cultured across the world. Common names include Amur carp and South China carp.

== Description ==
C. rubrofuscus is characterized by a fusiform body shape, varying in roundness. The typical size ranges from 30–60 centimetres (12–24 in), weighing in at around 50–350 grams (0.11–0.77 lb) depending on the life stage. It has large, bright elasmoid scales, which fully overlap and sit in the dermis pocket. The thin and elongated dorsal fin runs down the posterior half of the body, and it has large pectoral fins. The Amur carp typically has 29 to 33 (+2–3) lateral line scales, and 18–22.5 dorsal rays which are branched. The most posterior anal ray is bony and serrated, and it has a lightly forked caudal fin. The sub-terminal mouth is turned downwards and is protrusible. Like many other bottom-feeding cyprinids, C. rubrofuscus has four barbels which function to detect food and receive other mechanical stimuli.

C. rubrofuscus can be differentiated from C. carpio by its lower number of lateral line scales (29–33 vs. 33–37), as well as its higher number of dorsal rays (18–22 vs. 17–20). C. carpio typically exhibits grey and bronze coloration, while the wild coloration of C. rubrofuscus tends to be a silver body with red pelvic, anal, and caudal fins. However, some wild stocks in Laos are reported to have a solid grey coloring.

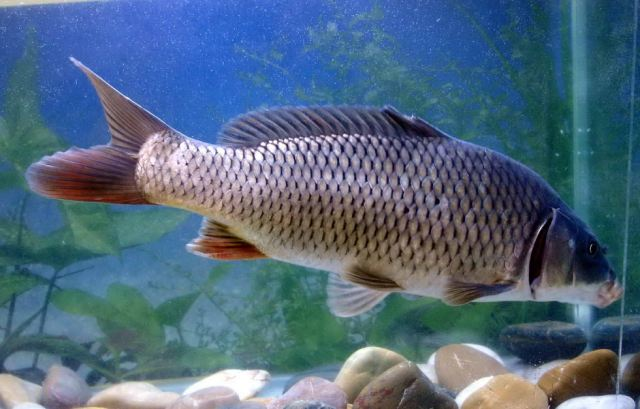
Red coloration of fins

In scientific literature, the species is often listed as C. carpio haematopterus, a synonym. Historically, the classification of Amur carp has been debated, with some sources considering it as an eastern Asian subspecies of the common carp (C. carpio). However, other studies have found genetic differences between the two, and only recently has it become recognized by authorities (such as ITIS and the IUCN Red List) as its own distinct species.

Within the population in Eastern Asia, some studies have looked into the differences between northern (“haematopterus”) and southern (“viridiviolaceous”) populations, but later studies have determined that they do not share a common ancestor.

== Genetics ==
The mitogenome of C. rubrofuscus is 16,582 base pairs long. It contains 13 protein coding, 22 tRNA, and two rRNA genes. After phylogenetic analysis, a tree was constructed using the maximum likelihood method. This classifies the grouping of Cyprinus based on the complete mitogenome. While this particular study lists C. rubrofuscus as a subspecies, it has since gained standing as its own species. However, as carp have been extensively transferred across Europe and Asia for centuries, studies have noted that the mixture of genetic lineages have made it difficult to determine clear phylogenetic boundaries.

Artificial selection has led to some amount of hybridization between C. rubrofuscus and other carp species within the aquaculture sector. As such, accurate identification of strains can be difficult. Still, various carp strains such as Ropsha have been confirmed to be directly crossed with wild Amur carp. Furthermore, studies into the Stavropol carp strain have revealed that Amur carp genes within the strain are a result of wild Amur genetic introgression.

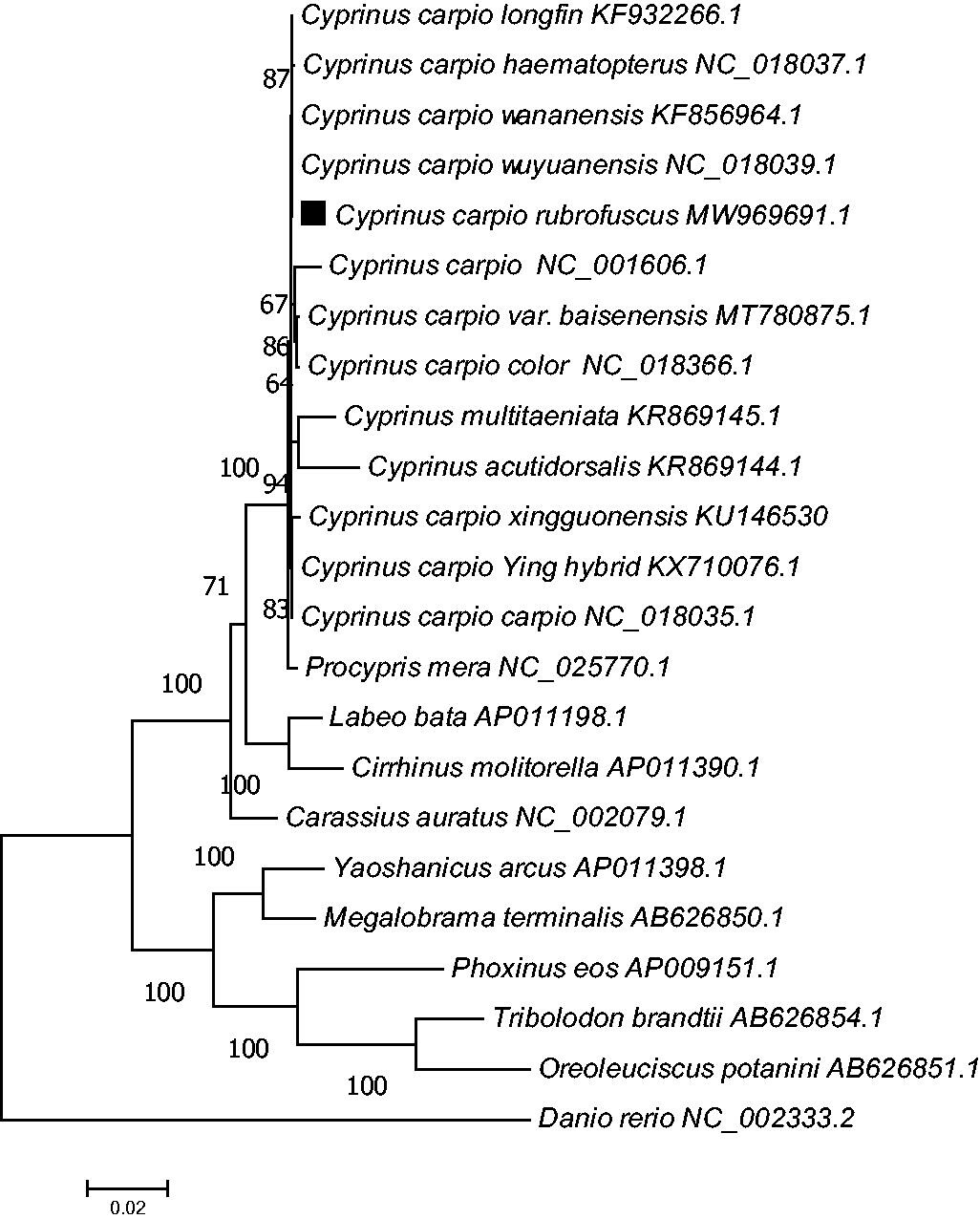
Phylogenetic tree of C. rubrofuscus (indicated by a black square)

== History ==
C. rubrofuscus has long been cultured as a food fish in regions including South China. Since the Han dynasty, carp have been polycultured along with rice, a practice that maximizes land use and productivity. The rice-fish aquaculture system allows nutrients to be recycled between plants and animals, with the fish providing fertilizer from their waste products and eliminating pests from the paddies. Although the exact origin of this ancient practice is still debated, carp have been farmed in China for over 1,500 years. The Amur carp’s general hardiness and rapid growth rate make it a suitable choice for cultivation, and it continues to be cultured in these systems in the modern age.

During the 1930s, the Soviet Union developed a breeding program to crossbreed Amur Carp to several other strains of carp including the Ropsha, Ukrainian, and Angelinskii. The primary objective was to enhance the hardiness and growing range by incorporating the cold tolerance genes of the Amur. A genetic study identified these cold tolerance genes, and linked them to similar genes to pufferfish and blue tilapia. These programs successfully produced hybrids that tolerated low temperatures, and they remain in cultivation in Southern regions of Russia.

=== Relationship to Koi ===
Carp have been cultured in Japan for over two thousand years. Koi, or nishigikoi, is believed to be artificially selected from both the Amur carp and the native Japanese carp based on genetic data. As C. rubrofuscus was commonly believed to be a subspecies of C. carpio, it follows that some literature refers to koi as C. carpio (or C. carpio carpio).

== Distribution ==
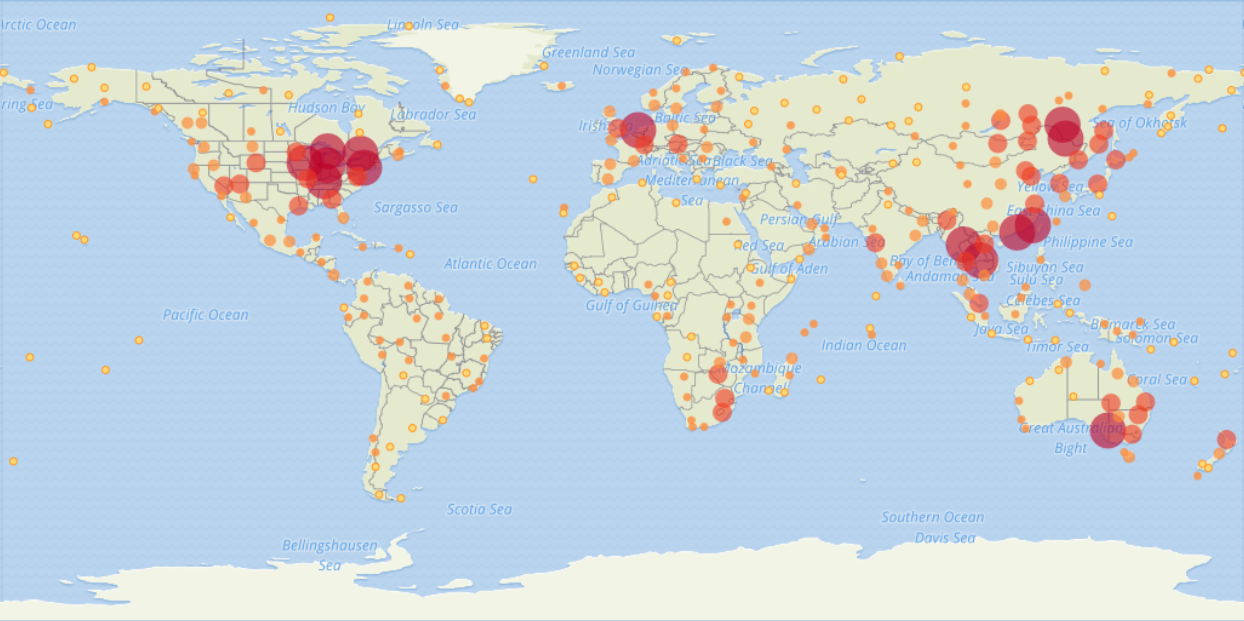
Reported occurrences according to GFIB

Originating from Eastern Asia, the native range of the Amur carp is in Mongolia, Russia, China, Laos, and Vietnam. It is found in mostly freshwater environments such as the Amur and Red River drainage basins and ponds, but is tolerant to slightly brackish water. C. rubrofuscus has been widely introduced throughout ponds in southeastern Asia, and is distributed for aquaculture purposes. In regards to distribution data, most reports group both ornamental Koi and the wild Amur carp. At present, it can not be determined which of the two the occurrence points represent.

== Habitat ==
Found in lakes and rivers, the species prefers slower flowing water of variable depth around 2 metres (6.6 ft). However, it is tolerant of a wide range of turbidity and flow conditions. It is an omnivorous bottom-feeder, with a diet consisting of benthic organisms and detritus such as arthropods, larvae, and weeds. The ratio between these feeds vary seasonally between wet and dry months depending on what is more readily available.

The Cyprinus genus is well known for its high tolerance to varying environmental conditions. C. rubrofuscus is further distinguished by its particularly high resistance to cold temperatures, high alkalinity, and low oxygen conditions.

== Biology and ecology ==
=== Lifecycle ===
The carp life cycle can be categorized into five groups: adults, eggs, larvae, young, and subadults. Fully grown carp possess the most tolerance for variable conditions, and prefer to live in schools. Adults will seek out sheltered, shallow water with low velocity to spawn. Carp eggs typically hatch within two to eight days, depending on the water temperature. Once hatched, larvae develop quickly and fry may travel upstream or downstream. Fingerlings will feed on the water column, but transition to bottom-feeding as they mature.

Use of the scales to age carp is the most common, but counting the growth rings of otoliths remains the most accurate method.

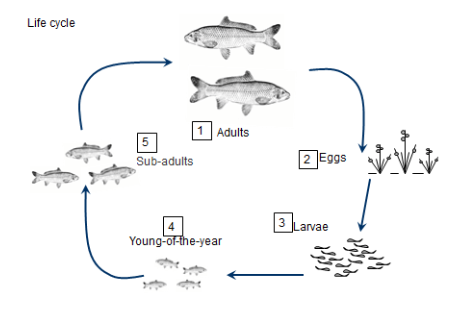
Carp life cycle

=== Growth and maturation ===
Carp growth is shown to be faster in warmer temperatures, but varies between time of year and habitat. Males reach sexual maturity around one year of age, while females take around two. Female carp are capable of laying a vast quantity of eggs, and can spawn multiple times a year.

== Conservation status ==
The International Union for Conservation of Nature (IUCN) assessed Amur carp to be of Least Concern due to its large distribution. It currently has no known widespread threats to the species as of 2022. However, official distribution data has not been updated since 2010, and the population trend remains listed as unknown.

While wild populations remain underreported, Amur carp serves as an increasingly popular species for freshwater aquaculture in Asia. Research on both Amur genetics and culture remains ongoing. A large-scale evaluation of Amur carp done in Kolkata, India found that it consistently outperformed those of other local Indian carp stocks across different environments and aquaculture systems. The evaluation notes that its notable growth performance and generalist feeding habits have allowed it to surpass the favor of C. carpio. The study further suggests that phasing out other common carp stocks in favor of Amur carp will increase production and culture potential to meet growing demands. Another study conducted in Uttarakhand, India further supported superior growth rates in Amur carp compared to the common carp. These findings suggest that the Amur carp will continue to find success in the aquaculture sector.

== See also ==
- Common carp
- Koi
- Aquaculture in East Asia
