= Bluebell Lakes =

Lakes in England

Coordinates: 52.52°N 0.456°W

Bluebell Lakes are a series of five fishing lakes in Tansor near Peterborough. The five lakes are Kingfisher, Swan, Bluebell, Sandmartin and Mallard. The lakes have carp up to 64 pounds (29 kg), tench to 14 pounds (6.4 kg), catfish to 130 pounds (59 kg), pike to 41 pounds (19 kg), bream to 18 pounds (8.2 kg), perch to 4 pounds (1.8 kg), roach to 2 pounds (0.91 kg) and crucian carp to 4 pounds (1.8 kg).

The lakes were home to what The Guardian described as "the UK's most famous fish", a large carp nicknamed "Benson", who was 60 pounds (27 kg) at her peak. Benson died in 2009, aged 25.
