= Bluebell Creek (Iowa) =

River in Iowa, United States

Coordinates: 42.70777°N 91.02846°W

Bluebell Creek is a very minor tributary of the Upper Mississippi River, confined mainly to Millville Township in Clayton County, Iowa, but rising in Liberty Township in Dubuque County. It enters the Mississippi just south of where the Turkey River meets the Big River.

== See also ==
- List of rivers of Iowa
