= Angler's Mail =

British fishing magazine

- Cover of Angler's Mail, 10 May 2011.
- Editor: Tim Knight
- Categories: Coarse fishing
- Frequency: Weekly
- Founded: 1964
- Company: Future plc
- Country: United Kingdom
- Based in: London
- Language: English
- Website: www.anglersmail.com

Angler's Mail was a weekly angling magazine published in London, UK, by Future plc.

The magazine covers aspects of modern coarse fishing, and is on sale every Tuesday priced £2.20. Its latest audited average weekly sales were 30,606 for the Jan-Dec 2016 according to the Audit Bureau of Circulations.

The Angler's Mail released its final issue on October 27, 2020 after publishing for 56 years.

== Initial launch ==
Angler's Mail was first published on green newsprint in 1964 by Echo Publications, a small publishing house in the West End of London.

In autumn 1965, the late John Ingham, then on sports desk at The People newspaper, owned by Odham Press, heard Echo were to close Angler's Mail because the circulation had fallen to 8,000 to 9,000 a week.

John said: "I spoke to the then editor of The People and suggested it would make a very useful addition because Echo were heavily into angling. He gave it his support and it was bought for £8,000 in January 1966. I recruited new staff for a relaunch on May 6. Unfortunately the editor of The People went home after a long meeting about the relaunch and dropped dead, but it still went ahead.

== Editors and history ==
John Ingham became founding editor in 1966. He served 20 years with Angler's Mail and 40 years with Odhams, which became IPC Magazines (now TI Media). Until John retired, not one, single computer was allowed inside the IPC offices (then King's Reach Tower) because of the unions, until Murdoch's revolution at Wapping. John wrote an angling column for The People until he died aged 88 at the end of 2011.

Roy Westwood became editor in 1986 and finally retired from the staff in 2002. During Roy's editorship Angler's mail became the UK's first all-colour UK angling magazine, ready for the start of the new coarse fishing season in June 1991. During the 1990s, Roy developed monthly magazine Stillwater Trout Angler. Angler's Mail also had sister titles in Coarse Angling (edited by Colin Mitchell) and, briefly, Improve Your Sea Fishing. All three magazines are no longer published. Roy continued to contribute to Angler's Mail as a photographer.

In 2002 Tim Knight became Angler’s Mail editor. Today he is the second longest-serving current staff member, behind features editor Richard Howard (who started in January 1987).

== Sister publications ==
2009 saw Angler's Mail's second publication of an annual magazine, Carp Tips. The fourth issue of Angler's Mail's annual Where To Fish magazine was also published in 2009.

== Demise ==
In October 2020, Angler's Mail announced over social media that on October 27, the last issue will be released. The publisher's Parent group, Future plc, had made the decision to close the title. The decision was most likely as a result of the financial challenges the print industry experienced throughout the COVID-19 pandemic. Various anglers across the UK, including the likes of Matt Hayes voiced their grief over the end of the Publisher over its 56-year history.
