= SEPTA Route 79 =

Route 79

Overview
- System: Southern District
- Operator: SEPTA City Transit Division
- Began service: 1912 (trolleys); 1956 (bus service); 1961 (trackless trolleys); 2003 (bus service)

Route
- Locale: Philadelphia
- Communities served: South Philadelphia, Point Breeze
- Start: 29th & Snyder Streets or 41st & Market
- Via: Snyder Avenue, University City
- End: Columbus Commons
- Length: 3.0 mi (4.8 km)

Service
- Ridership: 5,066 (2019 weekday average)
- Annual patronage: 1,519,800 (FY2019)
- Timetable: Route 79 schedule

Route 79 is a former streetcar and trackless trolley line and current bus route, operated by the Southeastern Pennsylvania Transportation Authority (SEPTA) in South Philadelphia, Pennsylvania, United States. The line runs between the Point Breeze neighborhood and the vicinity of Pier 70 along the Delaware River. It became part of the Philadelphia trolley bus system when trackless trolleys (the local term for trolley buses) replaced buses in 1961. Trackless trolley service was suspended in 2003, and the authority later decided against restoring trackless trolley service. Trolley cars had previously served Route 79 from 1912 until 1956.

== Route description ==
For buses that terminate at 40th & Market (or 41st & Market), buses start on Market Street, then make a right turn onto 41st Street, then, they make a right turn onto Powelton Avenue. After passing 40th Street, buses make a right turn onto 38th Street. Once continuing, they continue onto University Avenue, then 34th Street. Buses make a left turn onto Grays Ferry Avenue. Buses towards 40th & Market use 30th Street, while buses to Columbus Commons use 29th Street. Buses make a left turn onto Snyder Avenue (See below for continuing routing). For buses to 40th & Market, to reach Grays Ferry Avenue, Route 79 Buses make a right turn from Snyder Avenue to Vare Avenue. Then they make a right turn onto Hope Street, then towards 30th Street.

The line continues at 29th Street and Snyder Avenue, and then heads east along Snyder Avenue. At 25th Street, a viaduct above the street and the line is for a former Pennsylvania Railroad rail spur designed to serve neighborhood industries. Major intersections along this line include 22nd Street, Passyunk Avenue, and Broad Street, where commuters can connect to Snyder station on the Broad Street Line, along with a RiteChoice Pharmacy, which serves as an auxiliary bus stop for Greyhound and other intercity buses. The next major crossings are at 12th and 11th Streets which carry the southbound and northbound segments of Route 45, originally the southern portion of Route 23.

Just east of Front Street and under I-95, Route 79 runs through Snyder Plaza. Besides the former Route 29 trolley bus, other connections to Route 79 in this area include SEPTA bus routes 7, 64. Eastbound buses turn north on Dilworth Street until they reach Christopher Columbus Boulevard, near Pier 70. The route then turns down Christopher Columbus Boulevard until it reaches Snyder Street and head west again before passing by another shopping center known as Columbus Commons.

All buses are ADA-compliant, and contain bicycle racks. Overnight "Night Owl" service is available.

== History ==
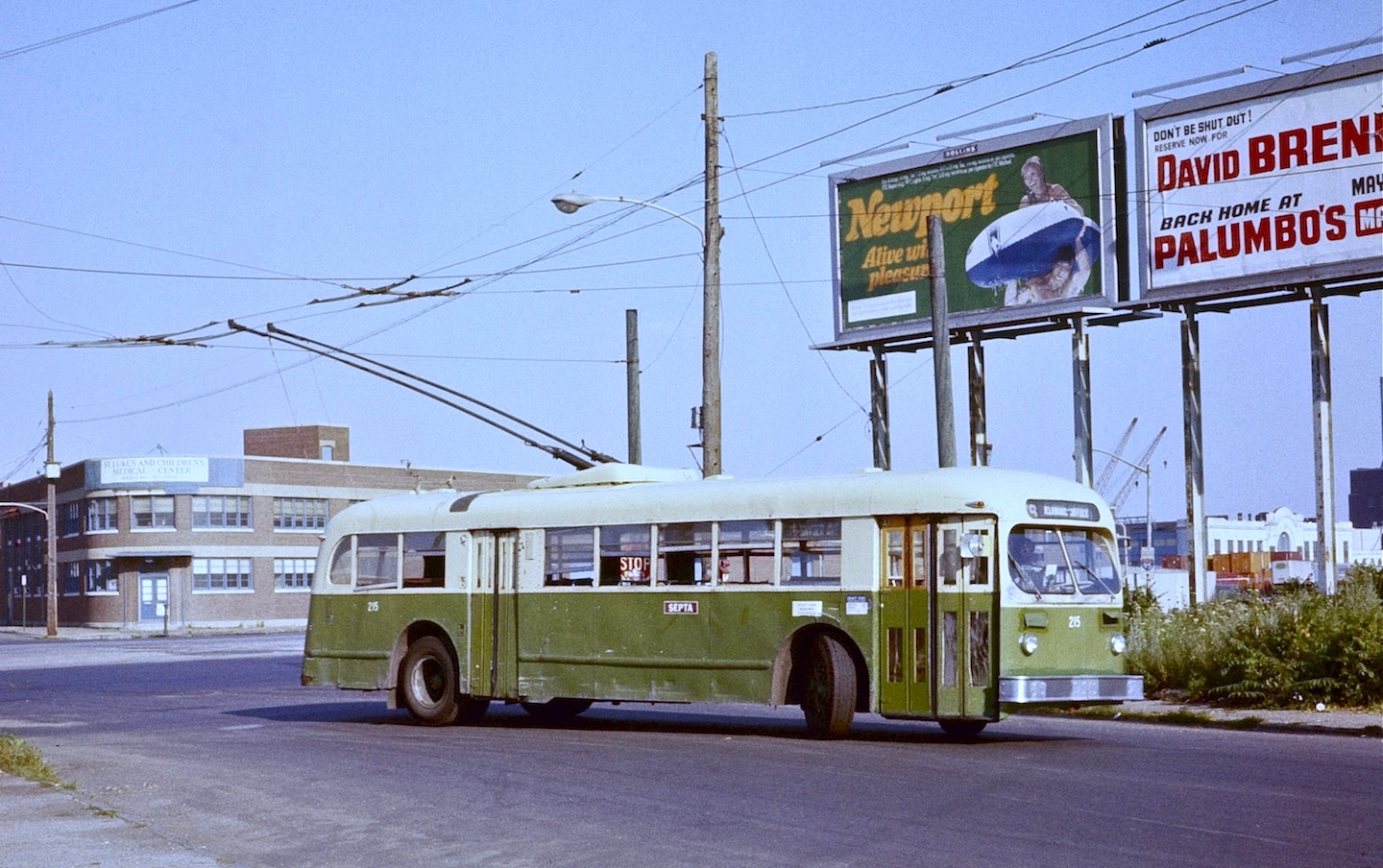
SEPTA Route 79 in 1978, when it was using a 31-year-old ACF-Brill TC44 trolley bus (No. 215)

Route 79 opened as a streetcar line along Snyder Avenue on January 1, 1912. It was converted to buses on October 28, 1956, and less than five years later was converted to trackless trolley service, on June 18, 1961. The route was operated by the Philadelphia Transportation Company from 1940 to 1968.

=== End of trolley bus service ===
In 2002–2003, all five SEPTA routes that were using trolley buses were indefinitely converted to diesel buses – SEPTA Routes 59, 66, and 75 in June 2002 and Route 29 in mid- to late February 2003. On Route 79, trolley buses were used in service for the last time on June 30, 2003. At the time, Route 79's service had been the last remaining trolley bus service in Philadelphia, and the 2003 cessation of trolley bus service was expected to be permanent, on all five routes. However, in early 2004 SEPTA began to consider reinstating trolley bus service at Frankford Division after the authority was informed that it would be required to repay some Federal Transit Administration funds used in the 2002–2006 renovation of that garage (including renewal of the yard wires) if trolley bus service did not resume.

Ultimately, trolley bus service on Routes 59, 66 and 75 was restored in 2008, with new trolley buses. A proposal to restore trolley bus service along Route 79 (along with 29) was considered by SEPTA in 2006, after the authority had placed an order for 38 new trolley buses for the three reinstated routes. However, in October 2006 the SEPTA board voted against any further consideration of purchasing new trolley buses to allow Routes 29 or 79 to be restored, a decision that effectively eliminated the possibility that trolley bus service might return to either of the two routes.

=== Bus service ===
As part of a pilot program, in 2016 SEPTA placed an order for 25 new battery electric buses from Proterra, Inc. They, along with two overhead charging stations, were purchased using a $2.6-million Federal Transit Administration grant, entering service on routes 29 and 79 in 2017, returning electric propulsion to these routes after nearly 15 years of diesel operation. However, the buses were pulled from service in February 2020 following the discovery of cracks in the bus frames. Combined with a battery fire involving one of these buses at a SEPTA depot and the bankruptcy of Proterra, Inc., this has led to the expectation that the buses will not return to service.

On March 23, 2023, SEPTA released a new draft plan for Bus Revolution, SEPTA's bus network redesign. As part of the plan, Route 79 would be extended to 40th Street station via University Avenue to provide better connections from South Philadelphia to University City, West Philadelphia, and the Market-Frankford Line. The line would also be extended on its eastern end to shopping at Pier 70. These changes remained in the final plan, which was approved on May 23, 2024. On August 23, 2026, Route 79 finally was extended to University City.

== See also ==
- Trolleybuses in Philadelphia
