= SEPTA Route 29 =

Bus route in South Philadelphia

Route 29
- Tasker-Morris Streets Crosstown; Pier 70 to 33rd–Dickinson

Overview
- System: Southern District
- Operator: SEPTA City Transit Division
- Began service: 1913 (streetcar); 1947 (trolleybus); 2003 (bus service)

Route
- Locale: Philadelphia
- Communities served: South Philadelphia, Grays Ferry
- Start: 33rd & Dickinson Streets
- Via: Tasker Street (westbound); Morris Street (eastbound)
- End: Pier 70 Shopping Center
- Length: 3.5 mi (5.6 km)
- Annual patronage: 1,297,500 (2019)
- Timetable: Route 29 schedule

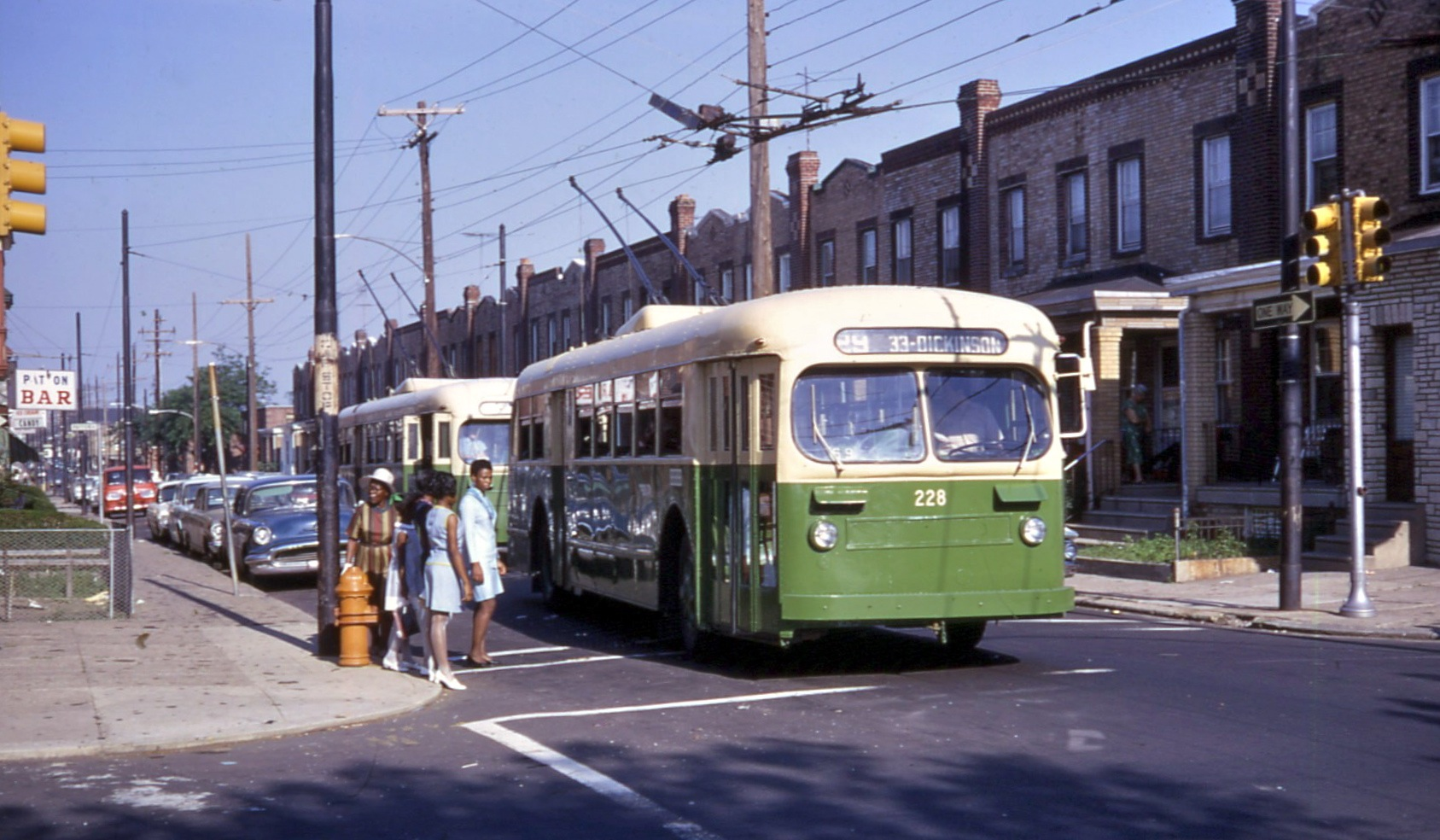
Trolley buses on route 29 in 1968

Route 29 is a former streetcar and trackless trolley line and current bus route, operated by the Southeastern Pennsylvania Transportation Authority (SEPTA) in South Philadelphia, Pennsylvania, United States. The line runs between the Gray's Ferry neighborhood and the vicinity of Pier 70 along the Delaware River.

Route 29 was a streetcar line from its inception in 1913 until 1947, and a trolley bus line until 2003, and was formerly part of the Philadelphia trolley bus system.

== Route description ==
Unlike the nearby SEPTA Route 79, Route 29 runs primarily along one-way streets. Eastbound buses run primarily along Morris Street, while westbound buses run primarily along Tasker Street. The west end of the Tasker Street segment turns north at 33rd Street, then east at Dickinson Street, then south at 32nd Street before heading east to Morris Street. Recent redevelopment of the Gray's Ferry area has disrupted this pattern.

At 25th Street, a viaduct above the two streets is for a former Pennsylvania Railroad rail spur designed to serve neighborhood industries. Major intersections along this line include 22nd Street, and Broad Street and connect to Tasker-Morris Station on the Broad Street Line. The next major crossings are at 12th and 11th Streets which carry the southbound and northbound segments of SEPTA Route 45. Route 45 was originally the southern segment of Route 23 until the line was split in half in 2015. Passyunk Avenue runs southwest to northeast in between these two intersections.

Connections at Pier 70 include 7, 25, 64, and 79.

All buses are ADA-compliant, and contain bicycle racks.

== History ==
Route 29 streetcar service started on November 16, 1913, replacing Route 7 crosstown streetcar service on Tasker and Morris Streets. Streetcar service ended on August 9, 1947, and the route was temporarily converted to buses on August 10 in preparation for its conversion to trackless trolley service, which began operation on December 14, 1947. The route was operated by the Philadelphia Transportation Company from 1940 to 1968.

=== End of trolley bus service ===
In 2002–2003, all five SEPTA routes that were using trolley buses were indefinitely converted to diesel buses – SEPTA Routes 59, 66, and 75 in June 2002 and Routes 29 and 79 in February and June 2003, respectively. Trolley buses were used in service on Route 29 for the last time in mid-February 2003, the actual last day of trolley bus operation being an unknown date between February 15 and February 22, 2003. A temporary route change, necessitated by major construction in the area, which detoured the service onto streets not equipped overhead trolley wires, took effect on February 23, requiring diesel buses to take over all Route 29 service for an initially indefinite period. However, because of heavy snowfall and other factors the week before the route change, the actual last use of trolley buses on this route may have been as early as the 15th, with diesel buses being substituted on a day-to-day basis until the February 23 route change. On the same date, the route was extended beyond the overhead wires at its eastern end, from Front Street to the Pier 70 Shopping Center.

A proposal to restore trolleybus service along Route 29 (along with Route 79) was considered by SEPTA in 2006, after the authority had placed an order for 38 new trolley buses for Routes 59, 66 and 75, all of which returned to trolleybus service in 2008. However, in October 2006 the authority's board voted against any further consideration of purchasing new trolley buses to allow Routes 29 or 79 to be restored, a decision that effectively eliminated the possibility that trolley bus service might return to Routes 29 and 79.

=== Bus service ===
As part of a pilot program, in 2016 SEPTA placed an order for 25 new battery electric buses from Proterra, Inc. They, along with two overhead charging stations, were purchased using a $2.6-million Federal Transit Administration grant, entering service on routes 29 and 79 in 2017, returning electric propulsion to these routes after nearly 15 years of diesel operation. However, the buses were pulled from service in February 2020 following the discovery of cracks in the bus frames. Combined with a battery fire involving one of these buses at a SEPTA depot and the bankruptcy of Proterra, Inc., this has led to the expectation that the buses will not return to service.

== See also ==
- Trolleybuses in Philadelphia
