= 40th Street station (SEPTA) =

Rapid transit station in Philadelphia

40th St
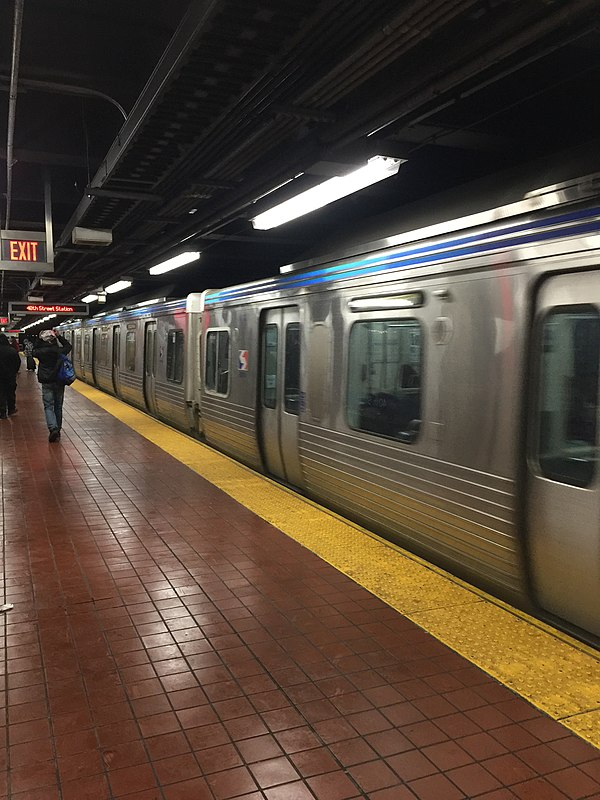
- 40th Street station platform

General information
- Location: 40th and Market Streets; Philadelphia, Pennsylvania
- Coordinates: 39°57′25″N 75°12′07″W
- Owner: SEPTA
- Platforms: 2 side platforms
- Tracks: 2
- Connections: SEPTA City Bus: 30, 40, 79, LUCY

Construction
- Structure type: Underground
- Accessible: Yes

History
- Opened: November 6, 1955
- Rebuilt: 2017

Services
Preceding station	SEPTA Metro	Following station
46th Street toward 69th Street T.C.	L (SEPTA Metro)	34th Street toward Frankford T.C.
On Sunday nights, Monday mornings, and other detours
41st & Lancaster toward 63rd–Malvern/Overbrook	diverted service	Terminus
42nd & Baltimore toward 61st–Baltimore/Angora	diverted service	Terminus
42nd & Chester toward Yeadon or Darby T.C.	diverted service	Terminus
42nd & Woodland toward Darby T.C.	diverted service	Terminus
42nd & Woodland toward 80th Street/Eastwick	diverted service	Terminus
Former services
Preceding station	Philadelphia Transportation Company	Following station
46th Street toward 69th Street	Market Elevated	36th Street Closed 1955 toward Frankford
46th Street toward 69th Street	Market Elevated	34th Street toward Frankford
Location

40th Street station is an underground station on the SEPTA Metro L, located the intersection of 40th Street and Market Street in Philadelphia, Pennsylvania, on the line between the Spruce Hill and Powelton Village neighborhoods in the University City District of West Philadelphia. The station serves a major shopping corridor of West Philadelphia on 40th Street, as well as the campus of the University of Pennsylvania, which lies three blocks south of the station.

The station is served by SEPTA City Bus routes 30, 40, 79 and LUCY. The station also serves as the inbound terminal for the SEPTA subway-surface trolley lines when services are diverted from the Market Street tunnels –– on Sundays & Mondays from 12:00 a.m. to 5:00 a.m. and during any other unforeseen circumstances. All T trolley routes (except T1, which boards on Filbert Street west of 40th Street a quarter block north of Market Street) start their outbound trips at the intersection of 40th Street and Market Street, just outside entrances to the Market–Frankford platforms. Inbound trips end on Filbert Street just east of 40th Street a quarter block north, and transferring passengers then have to walk south on 40th Street to the Market-Frankford entrances at Market Street.

== History ==
40th Street station was opened on November 6, 1955 by the Philadelphia Transportation Company, built to replace the elevated station that opened in 1907 as part of Philadelphia Rapid Transit Company's (PRT) original Market Street subway–elevated line from 69th Street to 15th Street, which was elevated west of 23rd Street.

The PRT announced a project to bury the elevated tracks between 23rd to 46th streets in the 1920s. The tunnel from 23rd to 32nd streets was completed by 1933, but construction on the remaining segment was put on hiatus due to the Great Depression and World War II. The PRT went bankrupt in 1939 and was reorganized as the PTC, which began building the rest of the tunnel in 1947.

The station was renovated in 2017, making it accessible to people with disabilities. Two elevators were installed, one for each platform, each of the four entrance stairwells were covered with artistic screens, and underground lighting and tiles were replaced. The project was completed on October 21, 2017, at a total cost of $10.9 million.

== Station layout ==
The station has two side platforms with separate fare control on either side. West of the station, the tracks climb out of a portal near 44th Street and run west as an elevated line.

== Image gallery ==
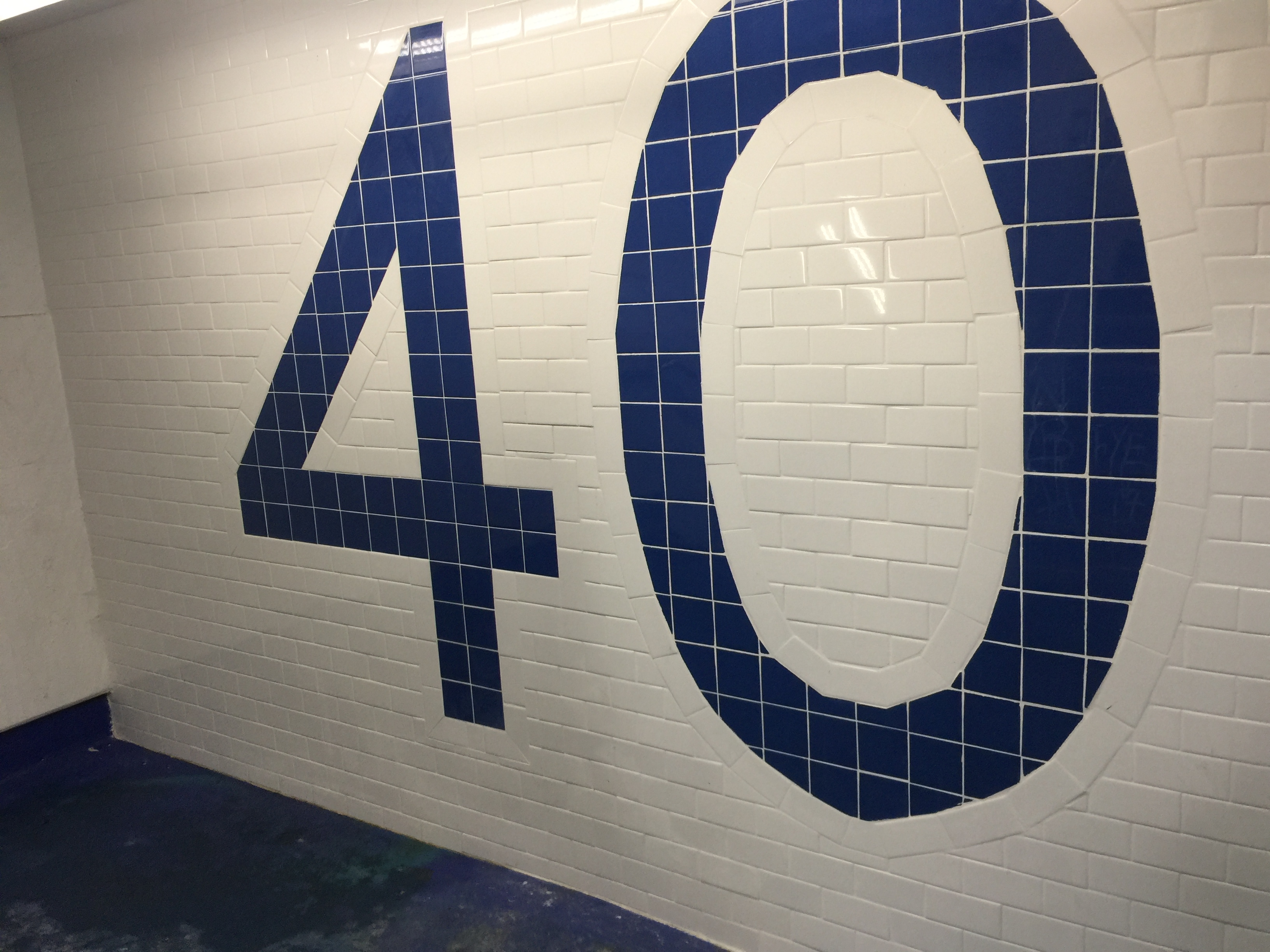
New stairwell tile installed in 2017

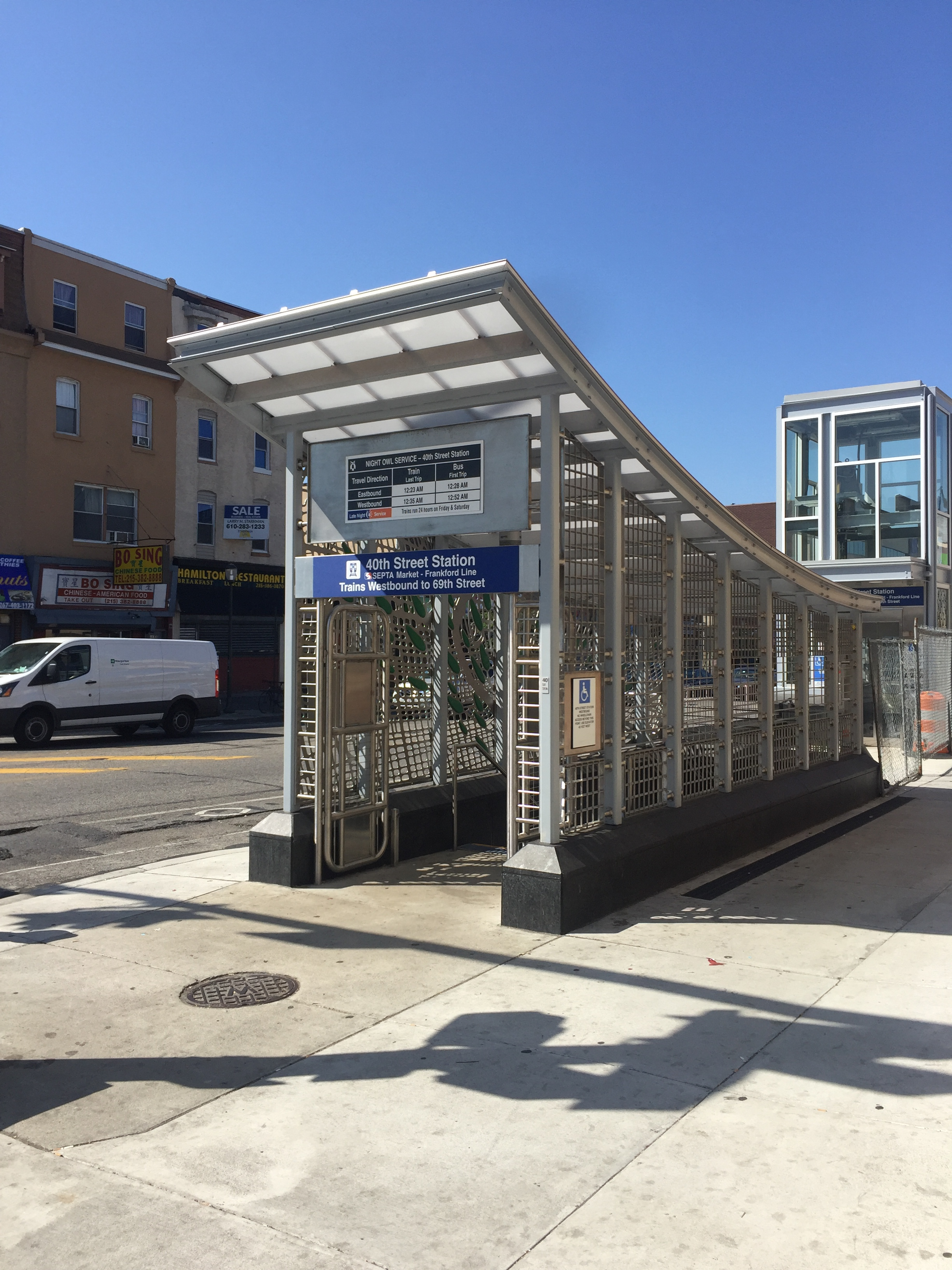
Newly-designed station entrance built in 2017

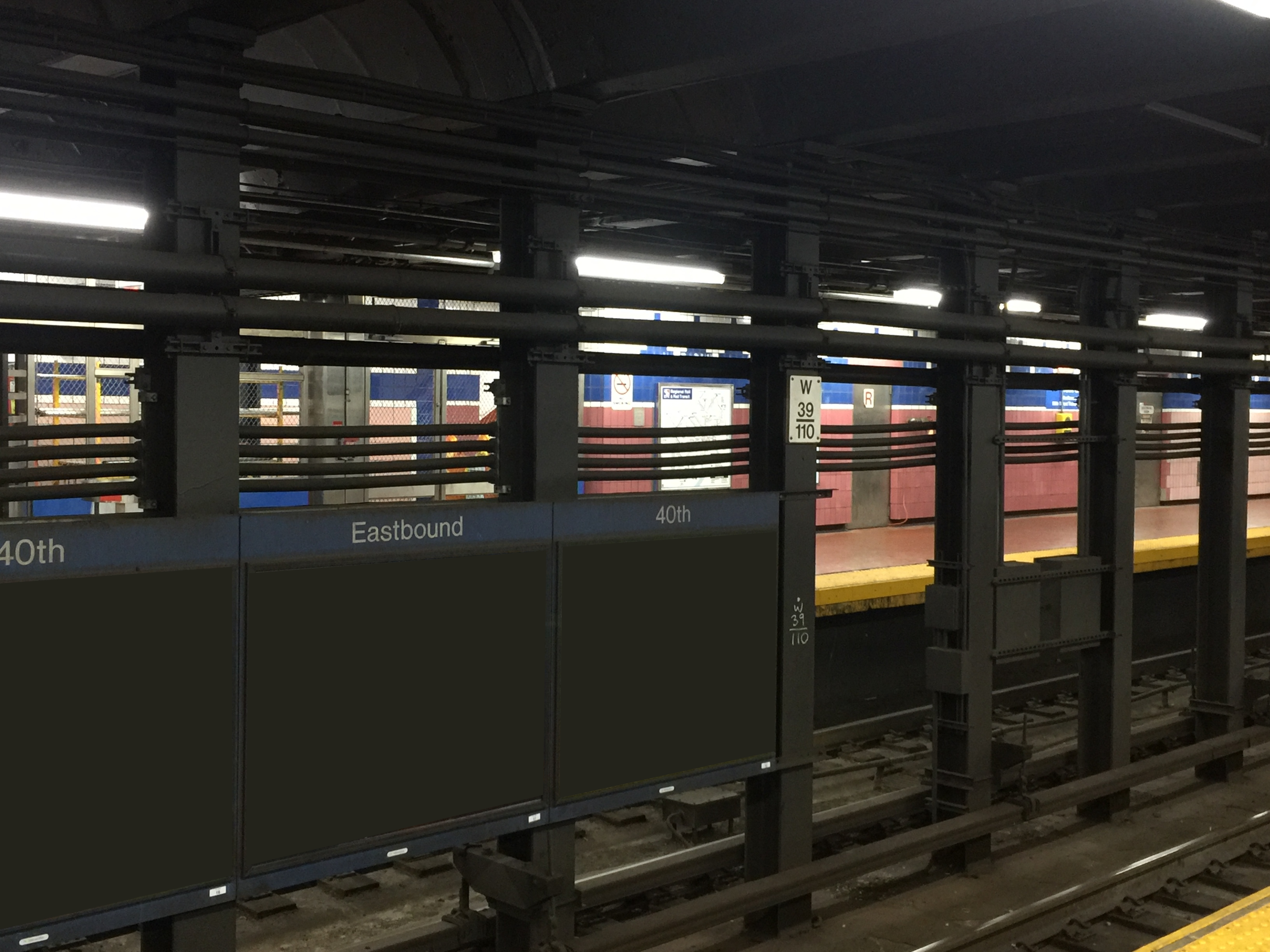
Underground platform

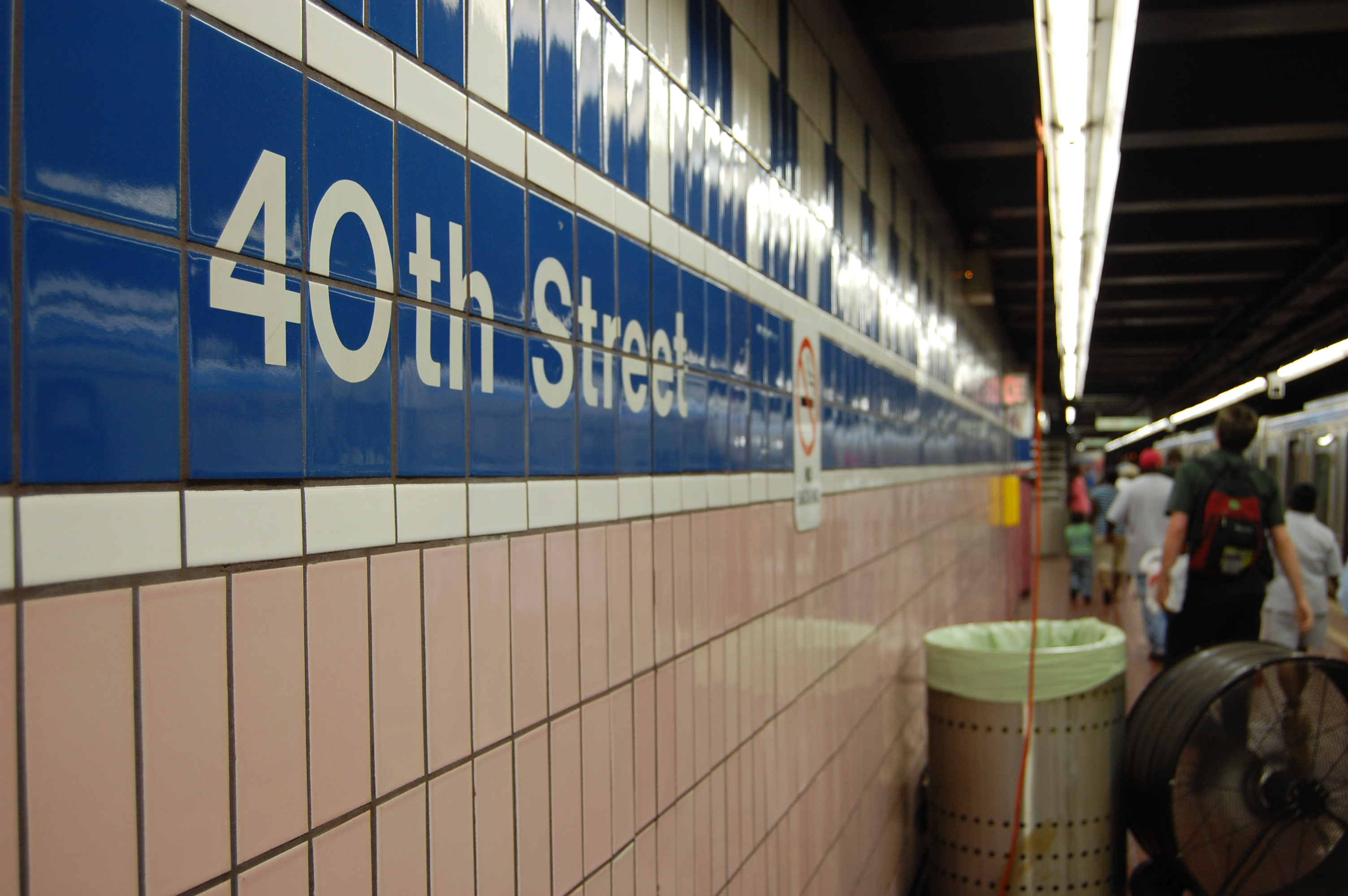
Old 40th Street station signage from 2007

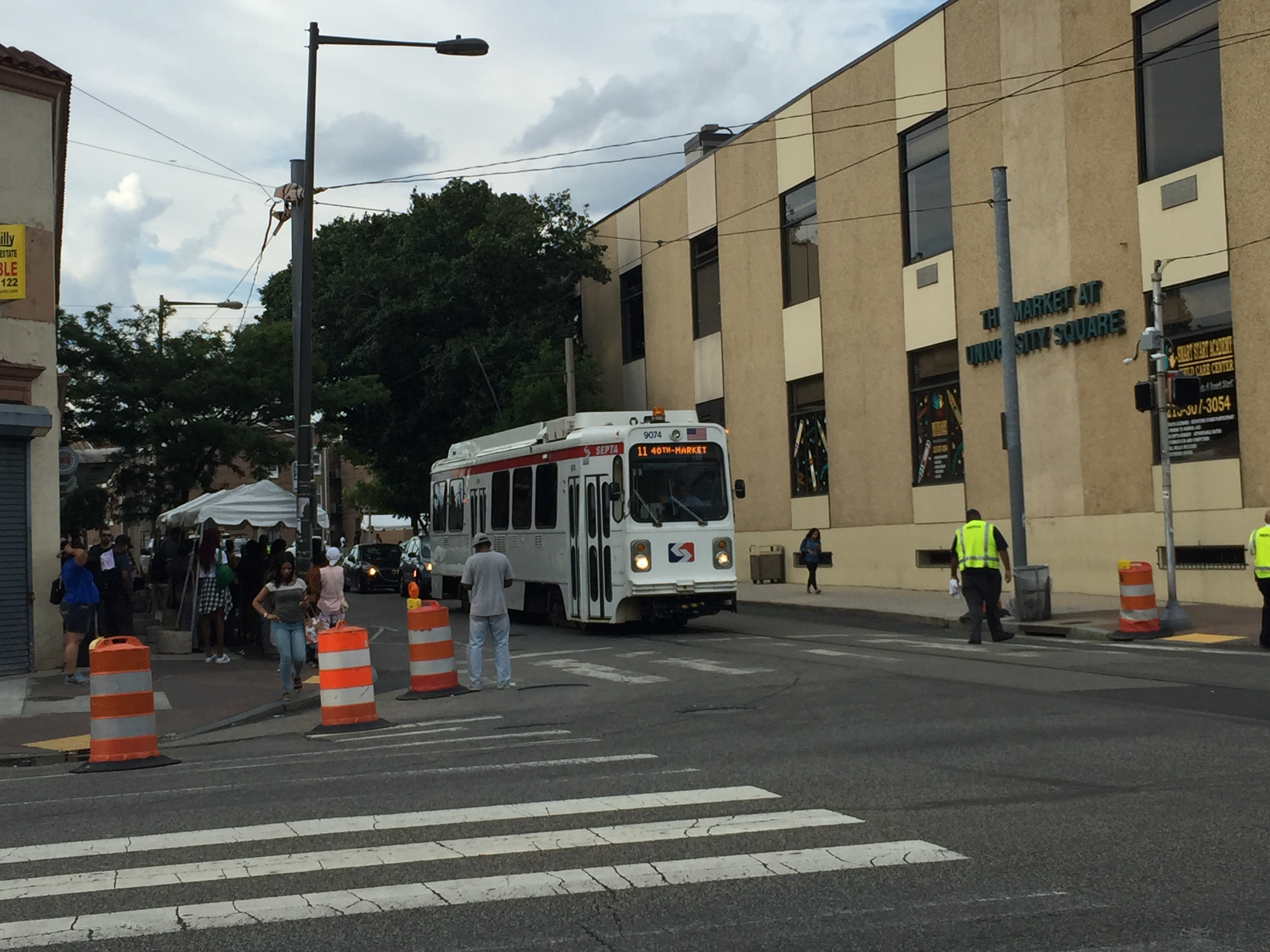
Diverted trolley at surface level
