= Frankford Avenue Bridge =

- U.S. National Register of Historic Places
- Philadelphia Register of Historic Places
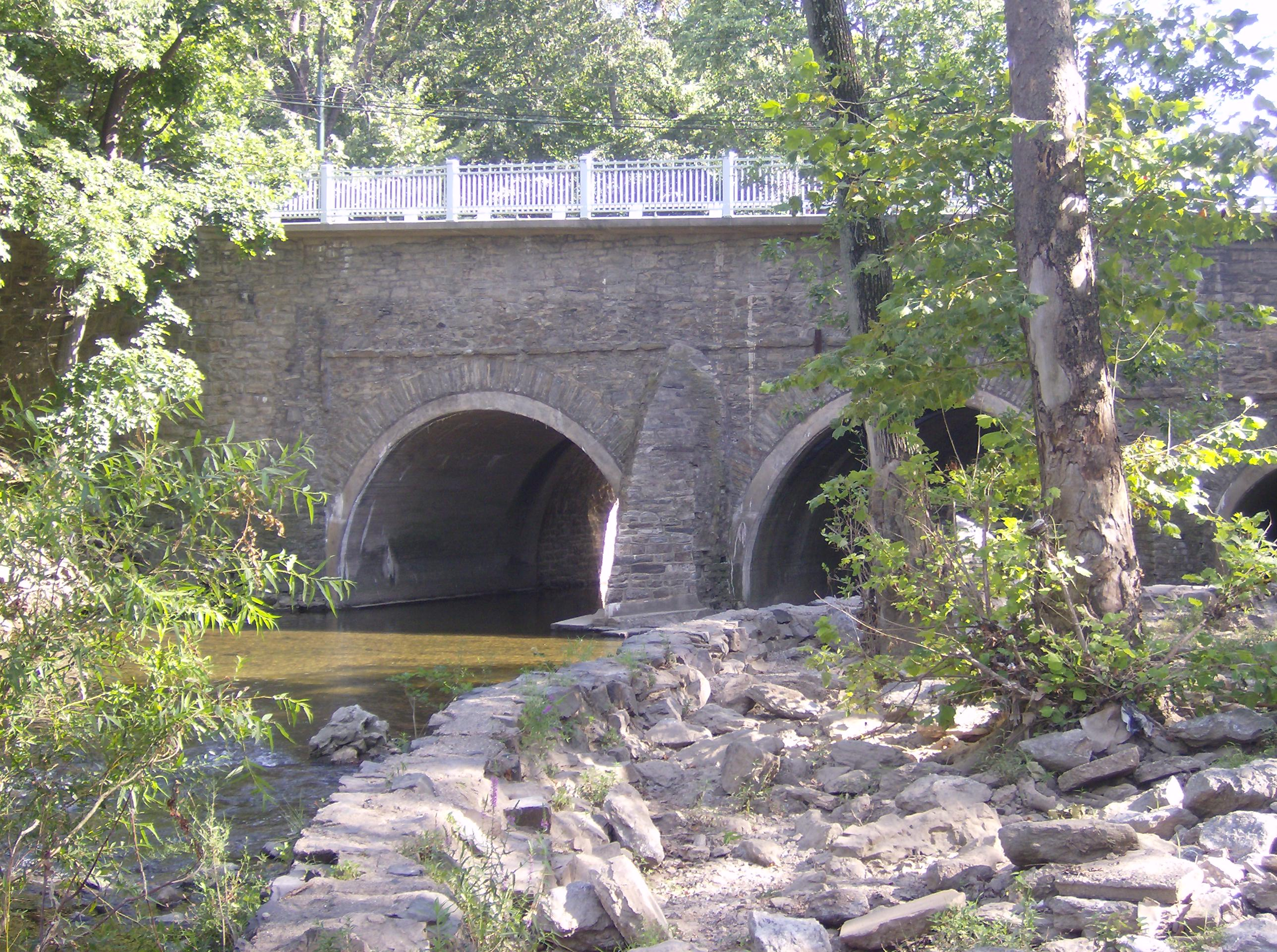

- Location within Philadelphia Location within Pennsylvania Location within the United States
- Location: US 13 (Frankford Avenue) – Philadelphia, Pennsylvania
- Coordinates: 40.043526°N 75.020553°W
- Built: 1697
- MPS: Highway Bridges Owned by the Commonwealth of Pennsylvania, Department of Transportation TR
- NRHP reference No.: 88000803
- Added to NRHP: June 22, 1988

The Frankford Avenue Bridge, also known as the Pennypack Creek Bridge, the Pennypack Bridge, the Holmesburg Bridge, and the King's Highway Bridge, erected in 1697 in the Holmesburg section of Northeast Philadelphia, in the U.S. state of Pennsylvania, is the oldest surviving roadway bridge in the United States. The three-span, 73-foot-long (22 m) twin stone arch bridge carries Frankford Avenue (U.S. Route 13), just north of Solly Avenue, over Pennypack Creek in Pennypack Park.

The bridge was designated a National Historic Civil Engineering Landmark by the American Society of Civil Engineers in 1970. It was listed in the National Register of Historic Places in 1988.

== Construction ==
The bridge, built at the request of William Penn to connect his mansion with the new city of Philadelphia, was an important link on the King's Highway that linked Philadelphia with cities to the north (Trenton, New York, and Boston). On March 10, 1683, the Pennsylvania General Assembly passed a law requiring the building of bridges across all of the rivers and creeks along all of the King's Highway in Pennsylvania, from the Falls of the Delaware (at Trenton, N.J.) to the southernmost ports of Sussex County (now part of the state of Delaware). The bridges, which were to be completed within 18 months, were to be ten feet wide and include railings along each side. The areas on either side of the bridges were to be cleared to facilitate horse and cart traffic. Each bridge was to be built by male inhabitants of the surrounding area; those who failed to appear were to be fined 20 shillings.

In 1970, the bridge earned an award by the American Society of Civil Engineers, Philadelphia Section, as an outstanding engineering achievement and a historic civil engineering landmark. A bronze plaque was placed on the western parapet in commemoration.

== Notable travelers ==
Anyone who traveled to Philadelphia by horseback or coach from the northern colonies crossed over the bridge, including delegates to the First or Second Continental Congresses, such as John Adams, from Massachusetts. In 1789, George Washington crossed the bridge on his way to his first presidential inauguration in New York.

== Improvements ==
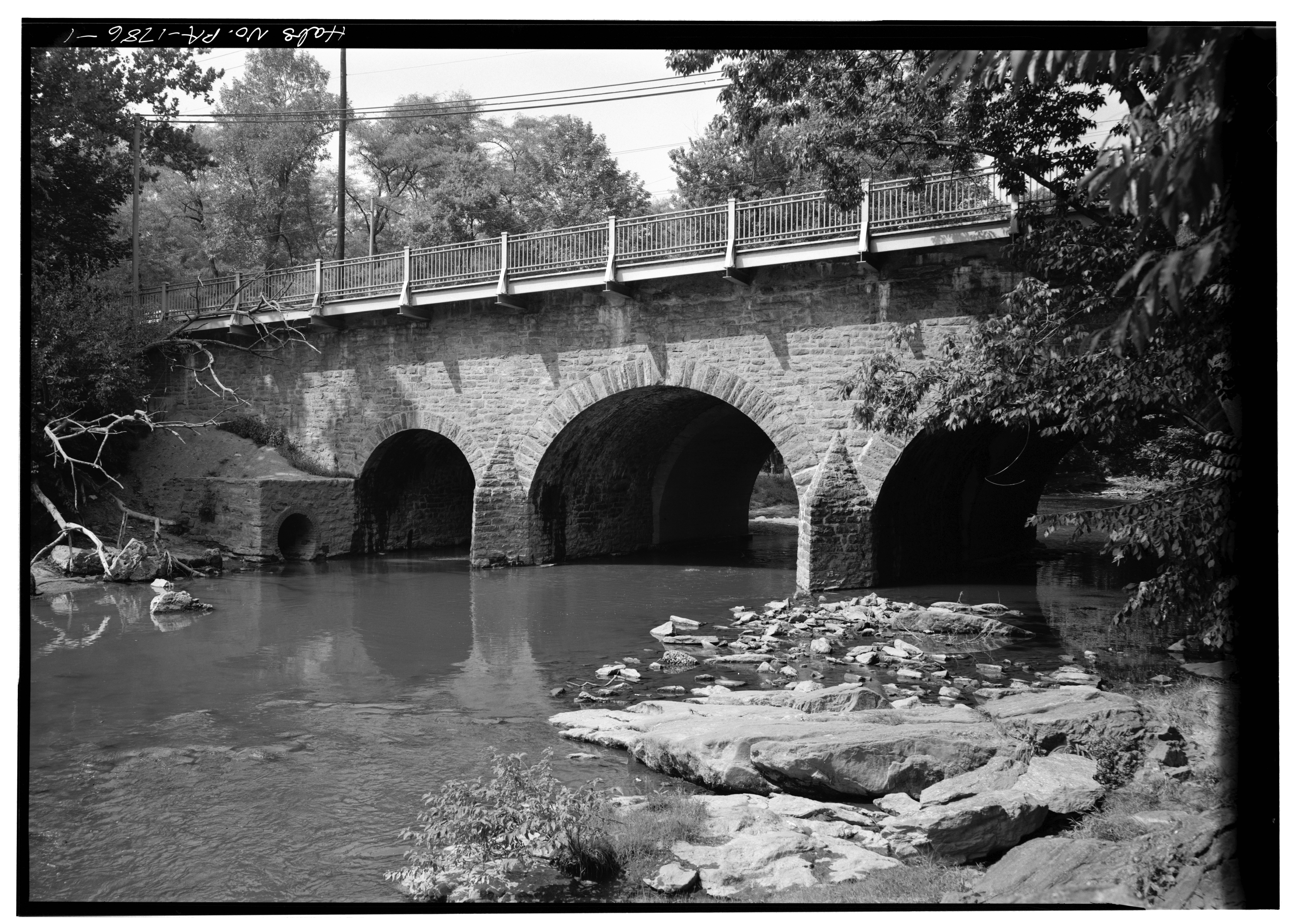
Photo from the Historic American Buildings Survey.

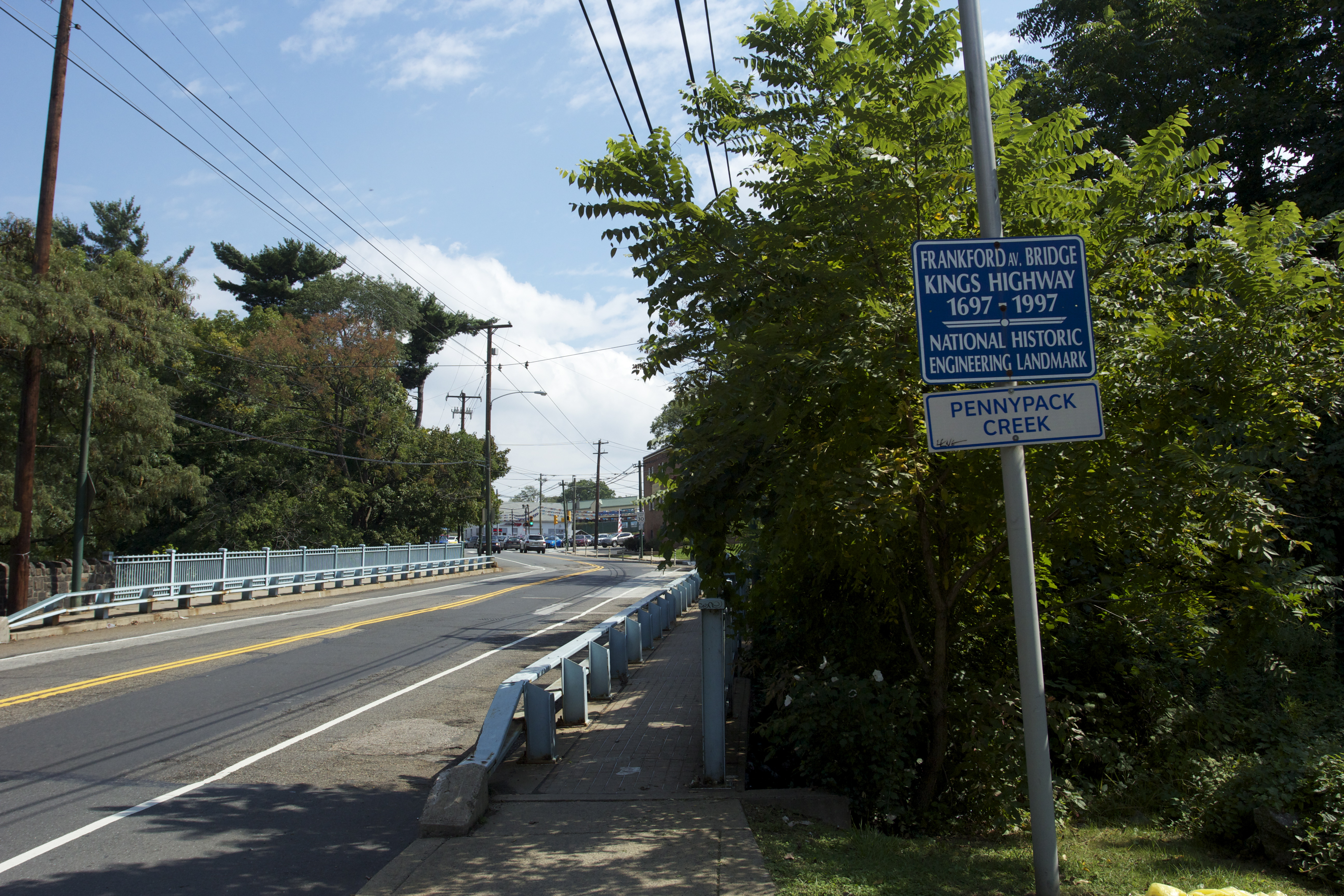
Frankford Ave. Bridge looking North.

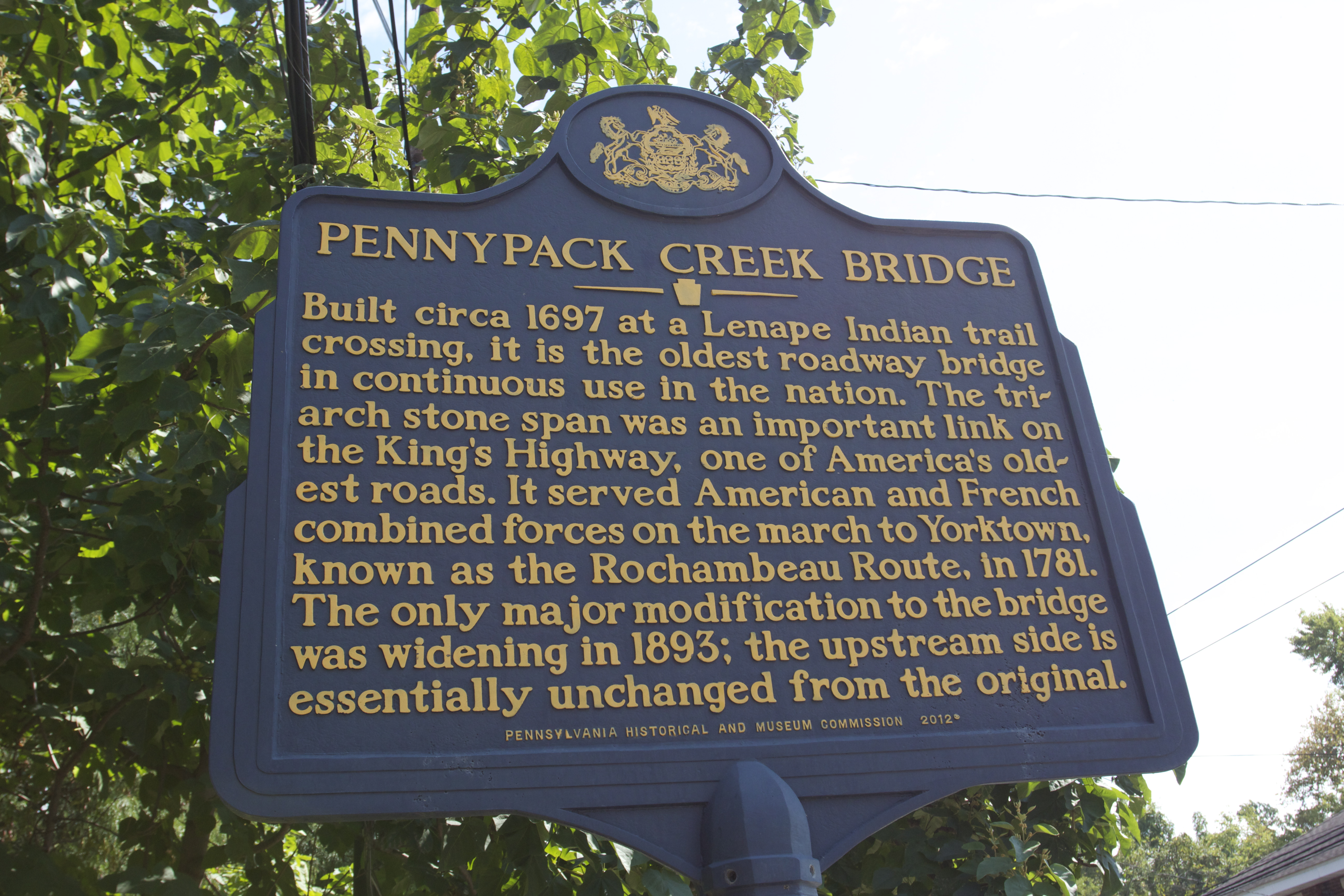
Historical Marker

In 1803, the bridge was paved with macadam, and at its south end a toll booth was erected, remaining in operation until 1892 when the turnpike was purchased by the city of Philadelphia. The bridge was widened in 1893 to accommodate streetcars, which commenced service in 1895, and again in 1950 to better accommodate automobile traffic. It remains in use today. The bridge was reconstructed during 2018.

== Transportation ==
SEPTA's trackless trolley route 66, which was formerly a streetcar, crosses the bridge on its journey from Frankford Transportation Center to Torresdale.

== Honors ==
The bridge was designated a National Historic Civil Engineering Landmark by the American Society of Civil Engineers in 1970. It was listed in the National Register of Historic Places in 1988.

== See also ==
- List of bridges documented by the Historic American Engineering Record in Pennsylvania
- Frankford Avenue Bridge over Poquessing Creek, built 1904, also on the National Register.
