= 46th Street station (SEPTA) =

Rapid transit station in Philadelphia

46th St
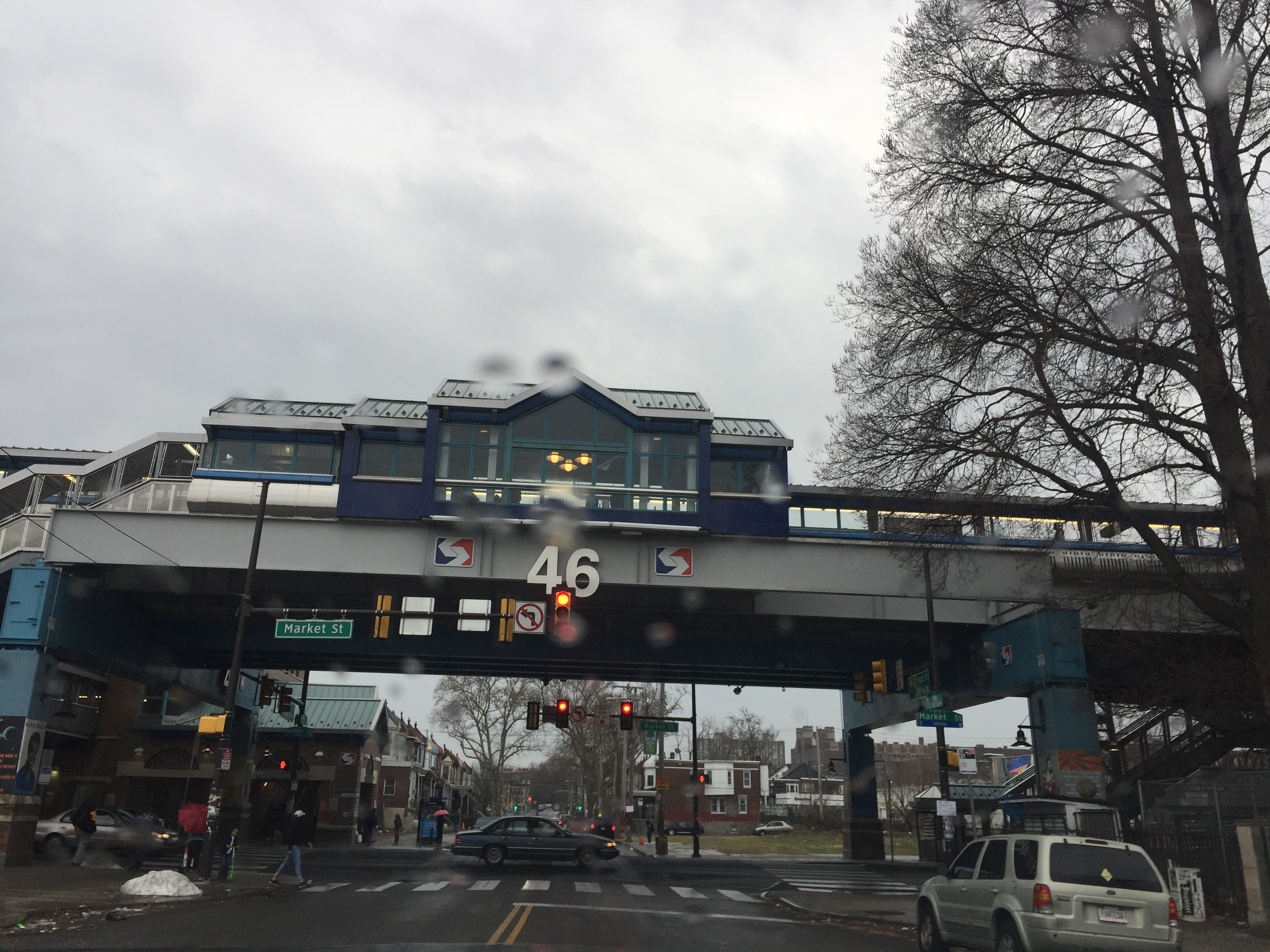
- The station exterior as viewed from 46th Street

General information
- Location: 46th and Market Streets; Philadelphia, Pennsylvania
- Coordinates: 39°57′31″N 75°12′51″W
- Owner: SEPTA
- Platforms: 2 side platforms
- Tracks: 2
- Connections: SEPTA City Bus: 31, 64

Construction
- Structure type: Elevated
- Accessible: Yes

History
- Opened: March 4, 1907
- Rebuilt: 2008

Services
Preceding station	SEPTA Metro	Following station
52nd Street toward 69th Street T.C.	L (SEPTA Metro)	40th Street toward Frankford T.C.
Former services
Preceding station	Philadelphia Transportation Company	Following station
52nd Street toward 69th Street	Market Elevated	40th Street toward Frankford
Location

46th Street station is an elevated SEPTA Metro rapid transit station in Philadelphia, Pennsylvania. It is located above the intersection of Farragut, 46th, and Market Streets in the Mill Creek and Walnut Hill neighborhoods of West Philadelphia, and serves the L.

The station is also served by SEPTA bus routes 31 and 64.

== History ==
46th Street station is one of the original Market Street Elevated stations built by the Philadelphia Rapid Transit Company; the line opened for service on March 4, 1907 between 69th Street and 15th Street stations.

The station was closed from June 2006 to April 2008 as part of a multi-phase reconstruction of the entire western Market Street Elevated. The renovated station, which included new elevators, escalators, lighting, and other infrastructure, as well as a new brick station house, reopened on April 14, 2008, The project resulted in the station becoming compliant with the Americans with Disabilities Act.

== Station layout ==
The station has two side platforms. The station house is located at the southeast corner of Market and Farragut streets, but there are also two exit-only staircases descending to the west side of the intersection.

Immediately east of the station, the trains go underground into the Market Street subway. A stub from when the elevated section used to continue along Market Street was once present, but was removed when the structure was replaced during renovations.
