= Arrott Transit Center =

Rapid transit station in Philadelphia

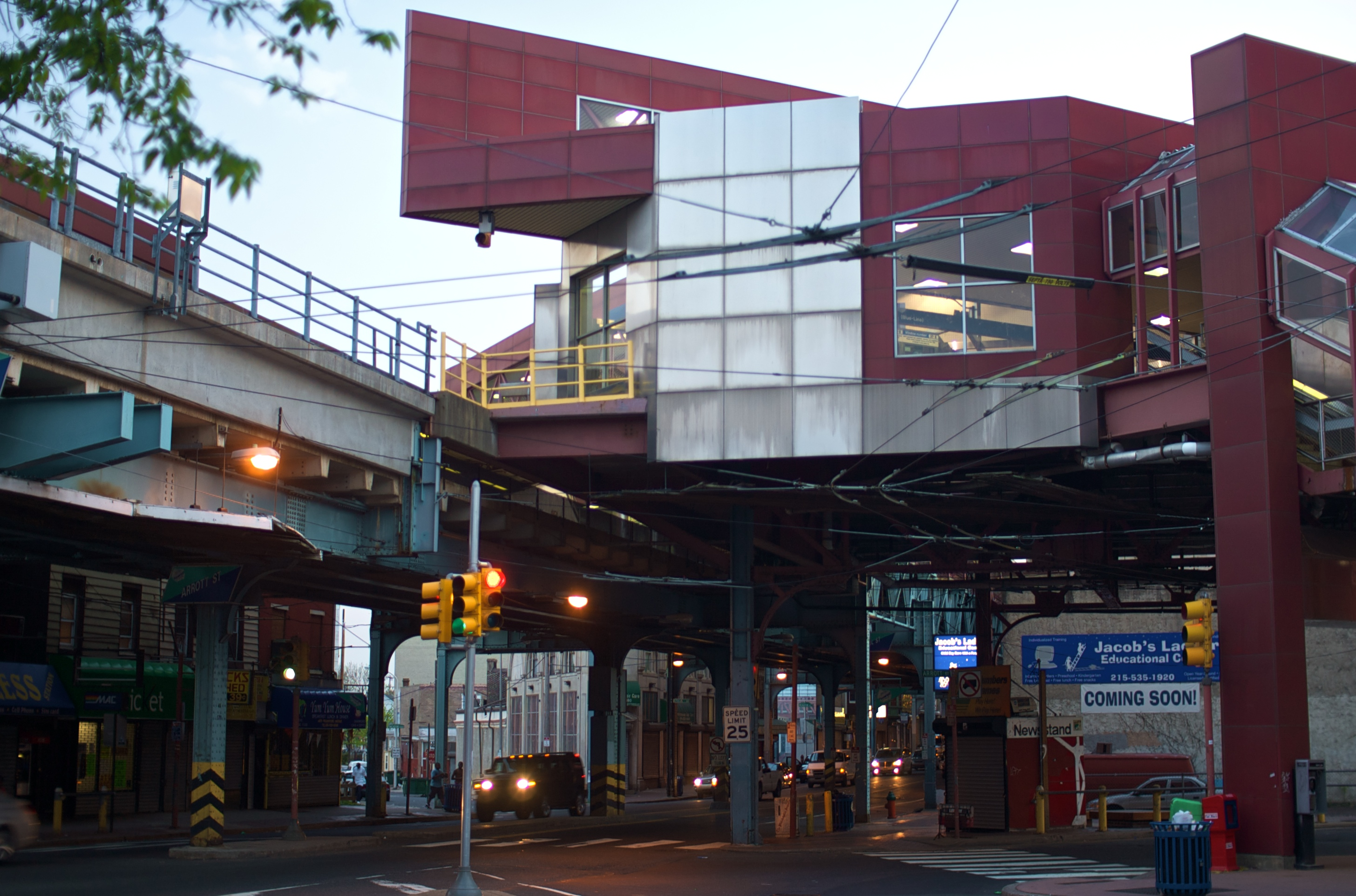

General information
- Location: 4700 North Frankford Avenue; Philadelphia, Pennsylvania
- Coordinates: 40°00′58″N 75°05′03″W
- Owner: City of Philadelphia
- Operator: SEPTA
- Platforms: 2 side platforms
- Tracks: 2
- Connections: SEPTA City Bus: 3, 5, 41, 59, 75, K

Construction
- Structure type: Elevated
- Accessible: Yes

History
- Opened: November 5, 1922
- Rebuilt: 2018
- Former names: Margaret–Orthodox (1922–2014); Arrott Transportation Center (2014–2025)

Services
Preceding station	SEPTA Metro	Following station
Church toward 69th Street T.C.	L (SEPTA Metro)	Frankford T.C. Terminus
Location

Arrott Transit Center is an elevated rapid transit station and bus station serving SEPTA Metro L trains and SEPTA City Bus routes. It is located at the intersection of Frankford Avenue, Oxford Avenue, Arrott Street, Paul Street, and Margaret Street in the Frankford neighborhood of Northeast Philadelphia, Pennsylvania. The terminal was originally known by two separate names, Margaret–Orthodox station for the Market–Frankford Line and Arrott Bus Terminal for bus routes.

SEPTA bus and trackless trolley service include routes 3 (33rd Street./ Cecil B Moore Avenue.-Frankford T.C), 5 (Front St./Market St.-Frankford T.C.), 41 (Wissahickon Ave./Chelten Ave-Bridesburg), 59 (Arrott T.C.-Castor Ave./Bustleton Ave.), 75 Arrott T.C.-Wayne Junction, and K East Falls-Arrott T.C.

== History ==
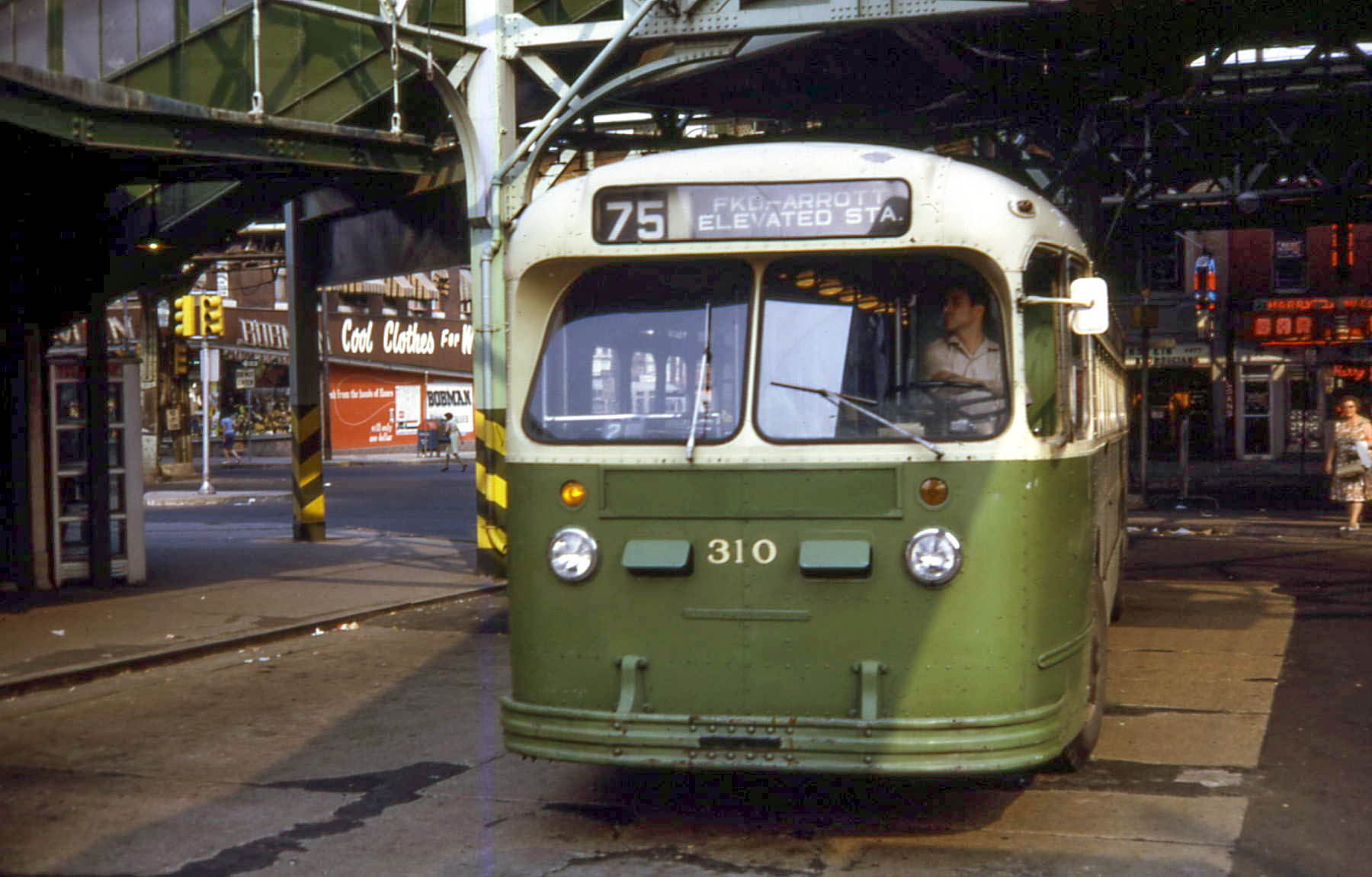
Front close-up of Philadelphia Transportation Company trolleybus 310 emerging from Arrott Transit Center in 1967.

Arrott Transit Center is part of the Frankford Elevated section of the line, which began service on November 5, 1922, as Margaret–Orthodox–Arrott station.

Between 1988 and 2003, SEPTA undertook a $493.3 million reconstruction of the 5.5-mile (8.9 km) Frankford Elevated line adjacent the station. The line had originally been built with track ballast and was replaced with precast sections of deck. Unlike other non-terminal stations on the Frankford El, this station was not immediately reconstructed.

From winter 2016 to winter 2018, SEPTA rebuilt the station platforms, stairways, roof canopies, and lighting at a cost of $39.86 million. Elevators and tactile warning strips were also installed, bringing the station to ADA accessibility requirements. During this project, the station was renamed from Margaret–Orthodox to Arrott Transportation Center. It was initially proposed to cost $20 million and be completed from 2011 to 2013.

== Station layout ==
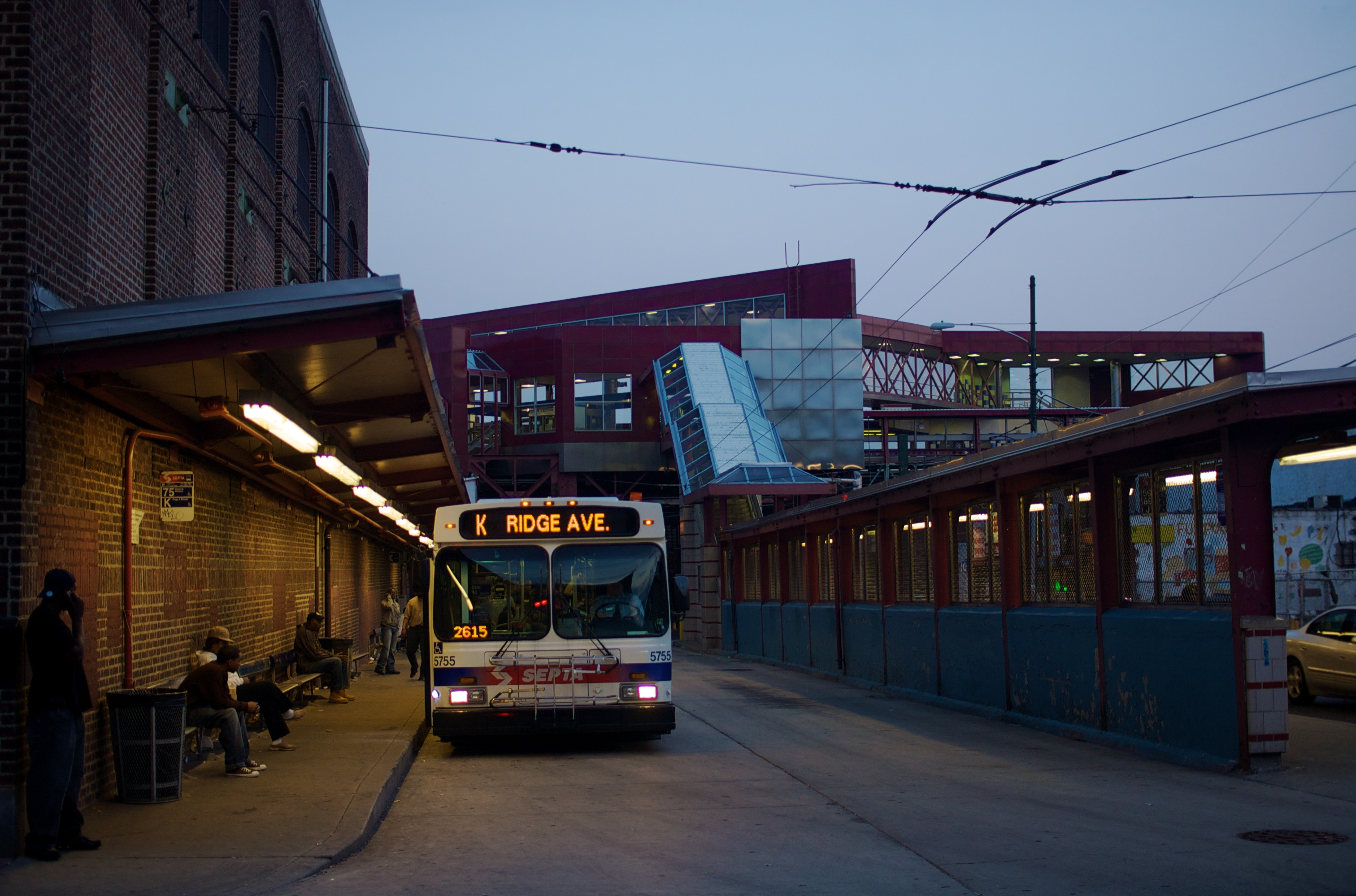
Route K at the bus terminal

The Market–Frankford station entrance is at the west side of the five-way intersection, located between Arrott Street and Oxford Avenue. There is another staircase directly serving the bus berths located on Arrott Street between Frankford Avenue and Griscom Street. The eastbound Market–Frankford platform has two exit-only staircases from the eastbound platform, serving the southeast corners of Overington Street and Frankford Avenue and Margaret Street and Frankford.
