= Trolleybuses in Philadelphia =

Trolleybus system in Philadelphia, Pennsylvania

Philadelphia trolleybus system

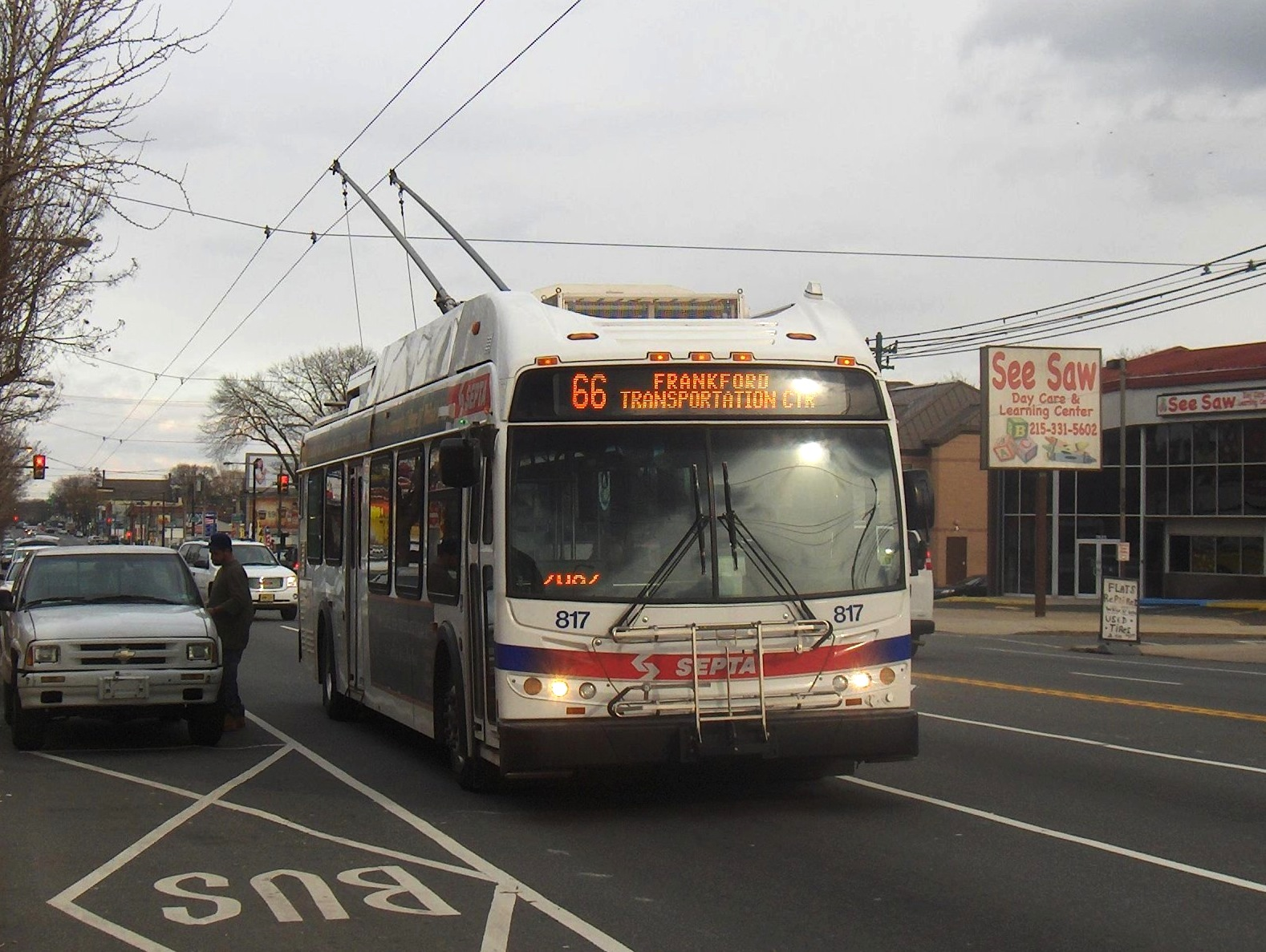
- A New Flyer E40LFR en route to Frankford Transportation Center

Operation
- Locale: Philadelphia, Pennsylvania, United States
- Open: October 14, 1923
- Operators: 1923–40: Philadelphia Rapid Transit Company; 1940–68: Philadelphia Transportation Company (PTC); 1968–present: Southeastern Pennsylvania Transportation Authority (SEPTA).

Infrastructure
- Electrification: Parallel overhead lines, 600 V DC

Statistics
- Website: http://www.septa.org SEPTA

The Philadelphia trolleybus system forms part of the public transportation network serving Philadelphia, in the state of Pennsylvania, United States. It opened on October 14, 1923, and is now the second-longest-lived trolleybus system in the world. One of only four such systems currently operating in the U.S., it presently comprises three lines and is operated by the Southeastern Pennsylvania Transportation Authority (SEPTA), with a fleet of 38 trolleybuses, or trackless trolleys as SEPTA calls them. The three surviving routes serve North and Northeast Philadelphia and connect with SEPTA's Market–Frankford rapid transit line.

== History ==
The first trackless trolley (trolley bus) service in Philadelphia was operated by the Philadelphia Rapid Transit Company, which had been established in 1902 by the merger of several then-independent transit companies operating within the city and its environs. Through a reorganization, the company became the Philadelphia Transportation Company (PTC) on January 1, 1940. The PTC was transferred from private to public ownership on September 30, 1968, when SEPTA (formed in 1964) took it over.

Of more than 300 trolley bus systems in operation worldwide (as of 2011), Philadelphia's is the second-oldest, exceeded in longevity only by that of Shanghai, China (in operation since 1914). That also makes it the oldest system in the Western Hemisphere.

The three Northeast Philadelphia trolley bus lines operating out of Frankford Depot, and the two South Philadelphia lines which operated out of Southern Depot, always existed in isolation from each other; there was never any trackless route or non-revenue 2-wire connection between those two networks. In addition, from 1941 to 1961, there were actually three disconnected trackless networks in the city, as PTC Route 61 operated out of Ridge Depot (closed on December 4, 1960) and did not connect with any other trackless line. (Pre-MBTA Boston, and the former Toronto system, also featured two or more disconnected trolleybus networks.)

=== 20th century ===
The city's first trolley bus line was route 80-Oregon Avenue, an east–west route in South Philadelphia which ran from 22nd Street to Delaware Avenue, a distance of 5.6 miles (9.0 km). Service began on October 14, 1923, with a fleet of 10 vehicles: nine 23.2-foot (7.1 m) built by the J. G. Brill Company (a major U.S. streetcar manufacturer) and called the "Rail-less Car" model, and one experimental unit built by the Commercial Truck Company (the only trolley bus ever built by that company). A tenth Brill unit was acquired the following year. All were replaced by more modern Brill T30 trolley buses in 1935.

After the opening of route 80, 18 years would pass before a second trolley bus line was opened. Route 61-Ridge Avenue became a trolley bus line on October 5, 1941, converted from streetcar operation. It was a much longer (11 miles) and more heavily used route. It ran from the Manayunk neighborhood, in the northwest, to the city center (locally known as Center City), and ultimately it was the only trolley bus route ever to serve Philadelphia's city center. PTC purchased 50 new, larger Brill trolley buses for this conversion, bought another 10 in 1942 and six vehicles from Pullman-Standard in 1944.

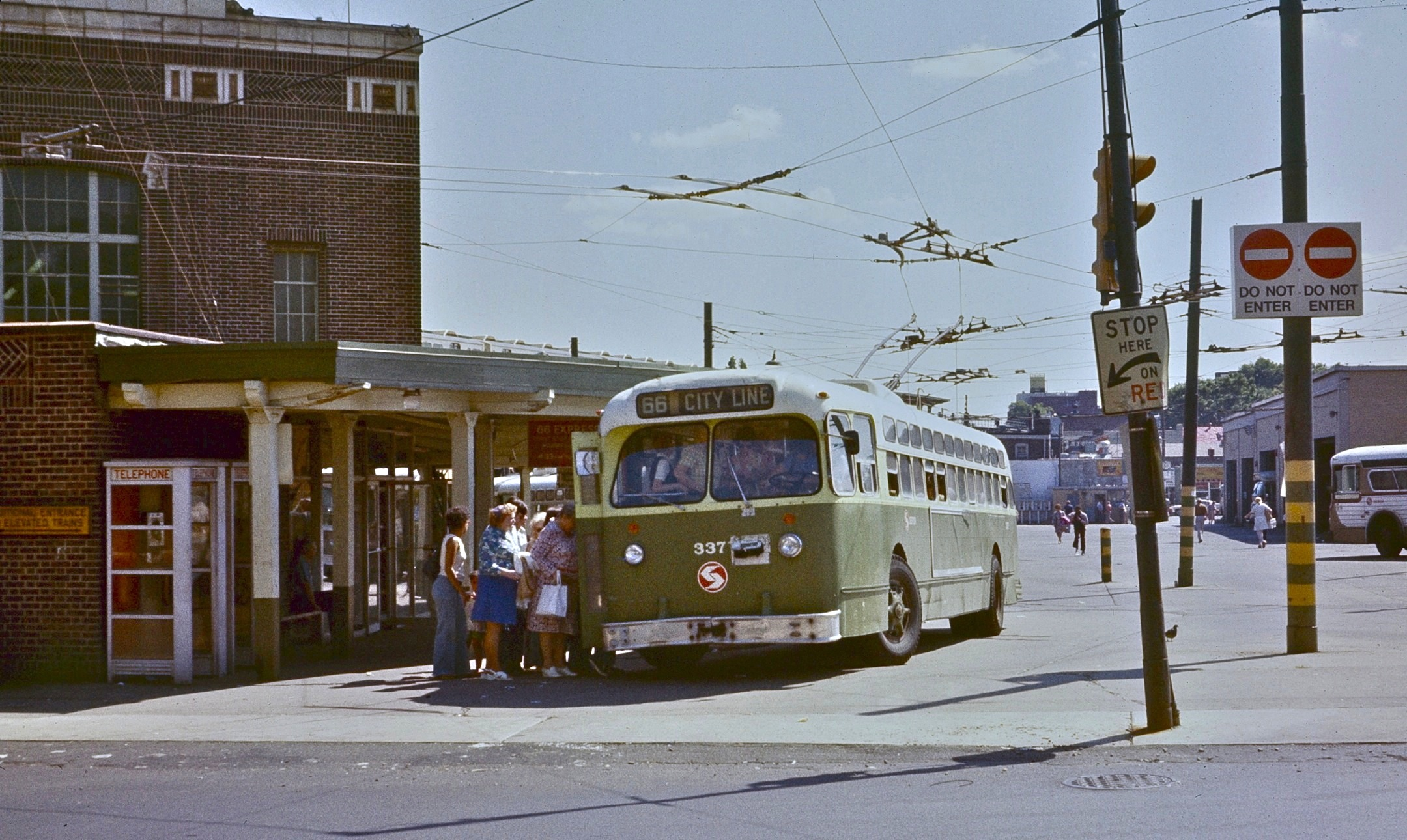
A 1955 Marmon-Herrington trolley bus loading on route 66 in 1978

A total of five additional routes were opened later: 29-Tasker-Morris in 1947, 75-Wyoming Avenue in 1948, 59-Castor Avenue in 1950, 66-Frankford Avenue in 1955, and lastly 79-Snyder Avenue in June 1961. However, routes 80 and 61 were converted to diesel buses in May 1960 and March 1961, respectively, so the system never had more than six routes in operation concurrently. The conversion of route 79 may have been prompted by a desire or need by PTC to make use of some of the trolley coaches made surplus by the conversion of routes 61 and 80 to diesel buses.

The five trackless routes in place in mid-1961 continued to be served by trolley buses for the next four decades, and three remain so in 2025. The rush hour service on route 66 includes several express trips, and one section of Frankford Avenue is equipped with a second set of trolleybus wires (in each direction) to enable trolley buses on express runs to pass those on local service. (A second section of express wires, located farther out along route 66, between Ryan Street and Rhawn Street, was removed around 2007, its scheduled use having been reduced to just one trip per day by 1998.) Route 66 also has "Night Owl" (all-night) service.

By 2001, the number of trolley buses needed for peak-period service had declined to 66, and consequently many of the 110 AM General trolley buses had been retired and used as sources of parts for the remaining units.

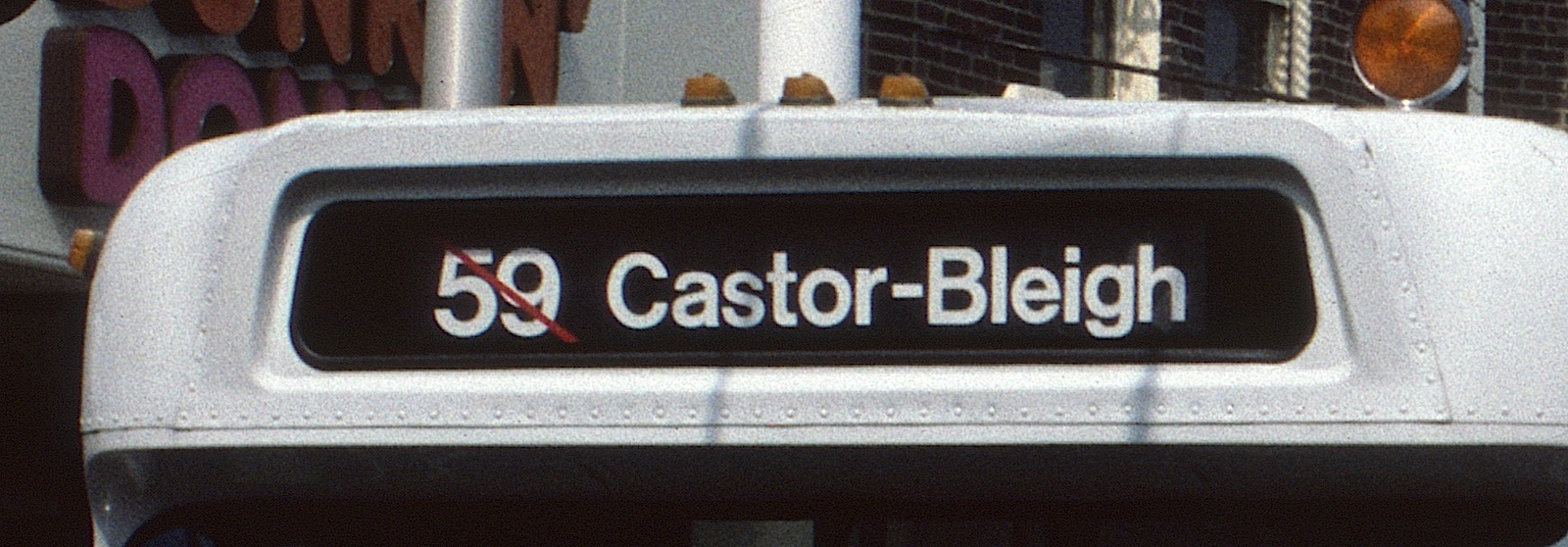
The slash mark, for short-turn trips, on a route 59 trolley bus, when the fleet still had rollsign-type destination signs

Until the retirement, in 2003, of the last trolley buses with rollsign-type destination signs, short-turn trips were indicated to riders by a red "slash" through the route number (known as a barré in British English, and barrata or barrato in Italy, where such practice was also common). Also used on Philadelphia's streetcar routes, this practice was very uncommon on trolley buses in North America.

=== 21st century ===
Until June 2002, five SEPTA routes used trolley buses, using AM General vehicles built in 1978–79. Routes 29, 59, 66, 75, and 79 used trolley buses, but were converted to diesel buses for an indefinite period starting in 2002 (routes 59, 66, 75) and 2003 (routes 29, 79). In the case of routes 59, 66 and 75, which are based at SEPTA's Frankford depot (garage), the initial reason for the conversion to buses was major reconstruction of the garage and the adjacent Market-Frankford "El" viaduct, and construction of a new Frankford Terminal. That work necessitated the temporary removal of the overhead trolley wires used by trolley buses both at the garage and along the deadhead route (running along Frankford Avenue, directly beneath the El viaduct) connecting routes 59 and 75 to the garage. Other reasons prompted the suspension of trolley bus service on routes 29 and 79, in 2003. At the time, the cessation of trolley bus service was expected to be permanent; the 110 AM General vehicles that had provided service on SEPTA's then-five trolley bus routes never returned to service (and all were scrapped in 2006).

However, in early 2004 SEPTA began to consider reinstating trolley bus service at Frankford Division after the authority was informed that it would be required to repay some Federal Transit Administration (FTA) funds used in the 2002–2006 renovation of that garage (including renewal of the yard wires) and the adjacent route 66 terminal if trolley bus service did not resume. In early 2006, the authority ordered 38 new New Flyer low-floor trolley buses, enough for routes 59, 66 and 75. In October 2006, the SEPTA board voted not to order additional vehicles for routes 29 and 79, and those routes became permanently operated with diesel buses. However, electric propulsion on these routes was expected to be resurrected upon the delivery of 25 new battery electric buses in 2017 using an FTA grant.

The pilot new low-floor trolley bus arrived in June 2007, for testing, but not in passenger service. The production-series vehicles were delivered in 2008 and began to enter service in April, enabling a resumption of trolley bus service in Philadelphia after a suspension of nearly 5 years. Trolley bus service resumed on routes 66 and 75 on April 14, 2008, and on route 59 the following day, but it was initially limited to just one or two vehicles on each route, as new trolley buses gradually replaced the motor buses serving the routes over a period of several weeks.

In October 2023, the system became only the second trolley bus system in world history to reach 100 years of age, after the system in Shanghai, China.

== Routes ==
=== Current ===
Trolley buses currently still operate on only the following three SEPTA routes:

Route 59	Arrott Transit Center – Oxford Avenue – Castor Avenue – Bells Corner, Rhawnhurst
Route 66	Frankford Transit Center – Frankford Avenue – Gregg Loop, Holmesburg – City Line Loop, Torresdale
Route 75	Arrott Transit Center – Wyoming Avenue – Wayne Junction, Nicetown

=== Former ===
Route 29	33rd & Dickinson – Water Street via Tasker Street (eastbound) and Morris Street (westbound)
Route 61	Container Loop to 8th & Walnut via Ridge Avenue, Manayunk
Route 79	Delaware Avenue – 29th Street via Snyder Avenue
Route 80	Front & Oregon to 22nd & Passyunk via Oregon Avenue

== Fleet ==
Fleet numbers	Quantity	Year built	Manufacturer	Model No.	Notes
51–59	9	1923	Brill	Rail-Less Car	
60	1	1923	Berg	B4	
61	1	1923	Brill	Rail-Less Car	Demonstrator purchased in 1924; originally built for Detroit Department of Street Railways
71–78	8	1935	Brill	T-30	
101–150	50	1941	ACF-Brill	40-SMT	Serial numbers 691–740
151–160	10	1942	ACF-Brill	40-SMT	Serial numbers 752–761
191–196	6	1944	Pullman-Standard	41-CS-100-44CX	
201–265	65	1947–48	ACF-Brill	TC-44	Serial numbers 423–487
301–343	43	1955	Marmon-Herrington	TC-49	Last trolleybuses built by M-H for a U.S. system; serial numbers 15467–509
471–498	28	1949	Marmon-Herrington	TC-46	Serial numbers 10777/804–830
800–909	110	1979–80	AM General	10240-E	Nos. 800–809 wheelchair lift-equipped; serial numbers SC123.0210–219/110–209
800–837	38	2007–08	New Flyer	E40LFR	low-floor buses

=== Past fleet, through the 1970s ===
Philadelphia's first trackless trolleys were supplied by the J. G. Brill Company in 1923. Brill was based in Philadelphia, but was one of the largest manufacturers of trolley cars (streetcars, or trams) in the world from the 1890s to the 1920s (last making streetcars in 1941), and produced trolley buses from 1921 to 1954. Philadelphia purchased more trolley buses from Brill than from any other manufacturer, a total of 133. However, vehicles were also purchased from other builders, most notably Marmon-Herrington (71 units) and AM General (110).

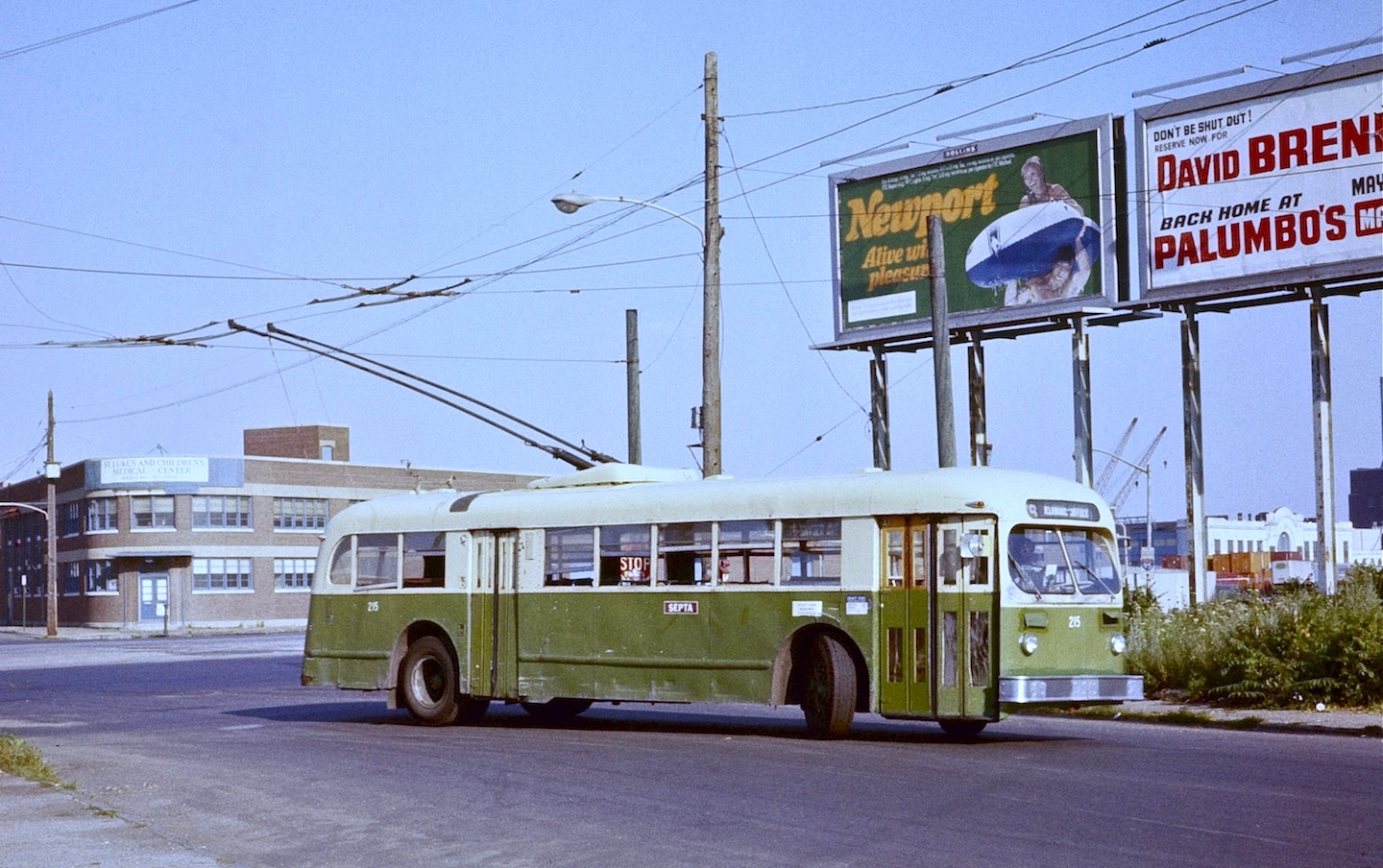
Already 31 years old at the time, ACF-Brill TC44 trolley bus 215 turning at the east end of route 79 in 1978

The original fleet of ten 23-foot-2-inch (7.06 m) Brill "Rail-less Cars" of 1923–24 was replaced in 1935 by eight Brill T30 vehicles, another short vehicle. With the conversion of the major Ridge Avenue route (61) to trolley buses in 1941, Philadelphia Transportation Company (PTC) again turned to Brill for the needed additional vehicles. PTC purchased 60 Brill trolley coaches (as such vehicles were then commonly called in the U.S.) in 1941–42, this time of the larger model 40SMT that the manufacturer had introduced in 1938. In 1944, six new trolley coaches were purchased from Pullman-Standard, but that small batch was not followed by any other purchases from Pullman. In 1947, PTC purchased another 65 Brill vehicles, these being ACF-Brill model TC44, Brill having merged in 1944 with American Car and Foundry Company. Some of these 1947 TC44 trolley buses remained in service on the Philadelphia system as late as 1981.

The next purchases were from the Marmon-Herrington Company. PTC brought 28 of that builder's model TC46 in 1949 and then 43 of the larger model TC49 in 1955. These were the last trolley buses acquired for more than two decades. Most of the older, pre-war trolley buses were scrapped in the 1960s. SEPTA took over the transit system in 1968, and by the 1970s the normal operating practice was for the Brill TC44 trolley buses to be used on the two South Philadelphia routes, 29 and 79, and Marmon-Herrington vehicles to be used on the three Northeast Philadelphia routes, 59, 66 and 75.

=== Post-1970s ===
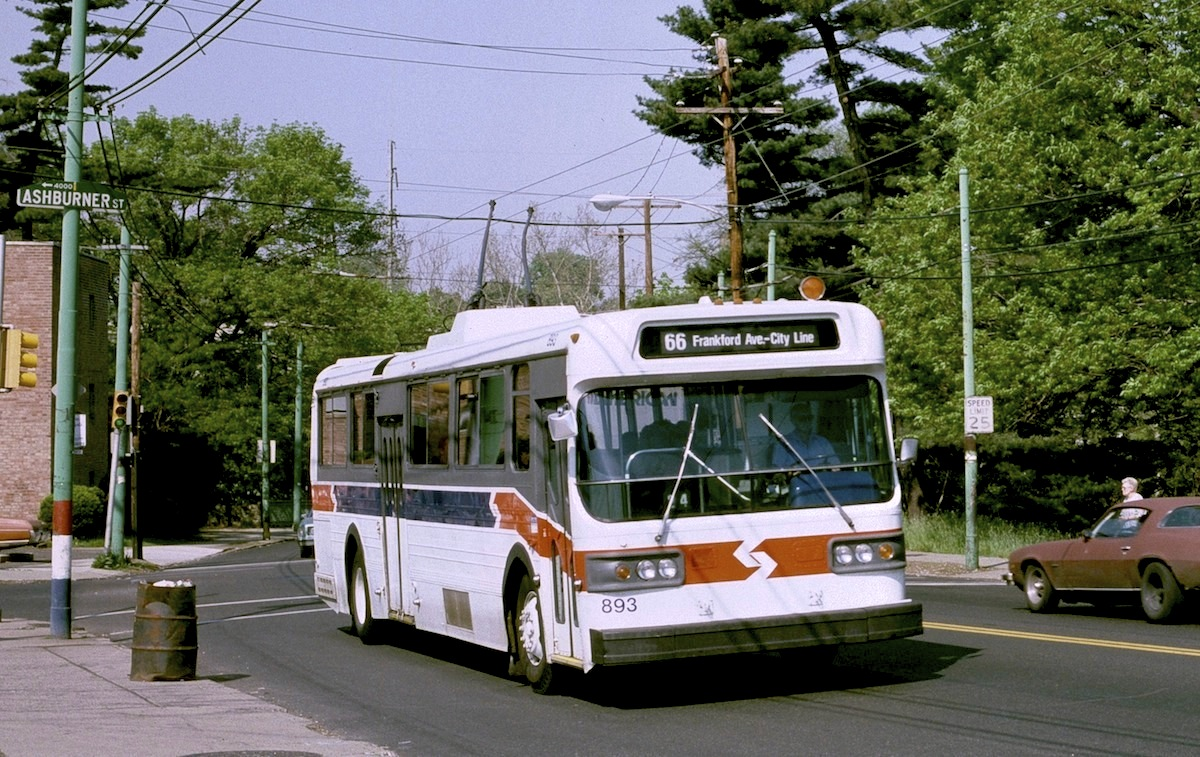
SEPTA AM General trolley bus 893 on Frankford Avenue in 1987

In the late 1970s, SEPTA partnered with Seattle's trolley bus system to place a joint order with AM General for new trolley buses, 110 for Philadelphia and 109 for Seattle. Numbered 800–909 in SEPTA's fleet, these 40-foot (12 m) vehicles were model 10240T, but had the same body style as Flyer Industries' model E800, used on several other U.S. and Canadian trolley bus systems from the 1980s to the 2000s, because the two manufacturers had worked together on the body design. These 219 vehicles were the only trolley buses AM General ever built. The first one built, SEPTA's No. 800, was tested on the Dayton trolley bus system in fall 1978. The remainder of SEPTA's 110 units were built in 1979, and they arrived and entered service in 1980. They were the system's first air-conditioned trolley buses. The last active Brill and Marmon-Herrington trolley buses were retired in 1981.

Because of service reductions in the 1980s and 1990s, the number of trolley buses needed for scheduled peak-period service on the five routes had declined to only 51 (plus spares) by at least the mid-1990s. Forty-four of the 110 AM Generals were placed in storage and later used for parts; in 2002, these were sold for scrap. The remaining 66 were placed in storage when all five routes were converted temporarily to diesel buses in 2002 and 2003. That conversion was later made permanent for routes 29 and 79. The stored AM General trolley buses, which were already 24 years old by 2003, did not return to service and were scrapped in mid-2006, but earlier the same year, SEPTA placed an order with New Flyer Industries for 38 new low-floor trolley buses. Philadelphia's AM General trolley buses operated in service for the last time on June 30, 2003, the last day of trolley bus service on route 79. They were the last AMG-built trackless trolleys in service anywhere, because the only other transit system to use such vehicles, Seattle, retired its last AM Generals in March 2003. For the 38 new vehicles from New Flyer, SEPTA reused the same fleet-number series as had been used for the AM Generals; the Flyers are numbered 800–837.

=== Current fleet ===
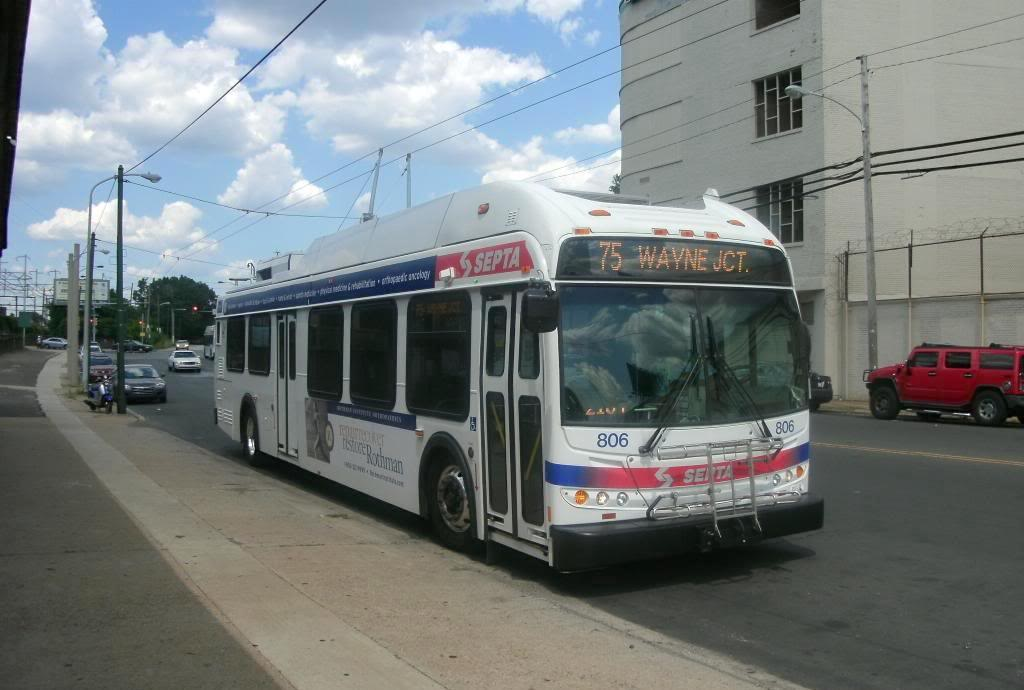
A New Flyer E40LFR from the current fleet at the west end of route 75

The present Philadelphia trackless trolley fleet consists of 38 conventional-configuration (two-axle) trolley buses:

Fleet numbers	Quantity	Year built	Manufacturer	Electrical equipment	Model No.	Configuration
800–837	38	2007–2008	New Flyer	Vossloh Kiepe	E40LFR	Standard (two-axle), low-floor

SEPTA placed its order for these trolley buses in February 2006. The first vehicle was delivered in June 2007, and the remaining 37 were received by SEPTA during 2008. These trolley buses have a diesel-driven auxiliary power unit, which provides electric power to the motors to enable limited operation away from overhead trolley wires.

=== Preserved vehicles ===
A few retired Philadelphia trolley buses have been saved for historical preservation, including at public museums. 1947-built ACF-Brills 205 and 210 were acquired by the Shore Line Trolley Museum in 1981, when withdrawn from service in Philadelphia. Number 205 is in operating condition, and in 2009 it became the first trolley bus ever to operate at the museum (powered normally, from overhead wires), when it tested the first section of a short trolley bus line that is under construction there. The Seashore Trolley Museum's collection includes ex-Philadelphia trolley bus 336, a 1955 Marmon-Herrington TC49; it is not currently in operating condition. A few other ex-Philadelphia ACF-Brill and Marmon-Herrington trolley buses have been saved by private individuals, including one Marmon TC46. No other types of Philadelphia trolley buses, such as AM Generals or earlier types of Brill vehicles, have been preserved.

== See also ==
- List of trolleybus systems in the United States
- SEPTA City Transit Division surface routes
