= SEPTA Route 66 =

Trackless trolley route in Philadelphia, US

Route 66
- Frankford-Knights to Frankford Transportation Center

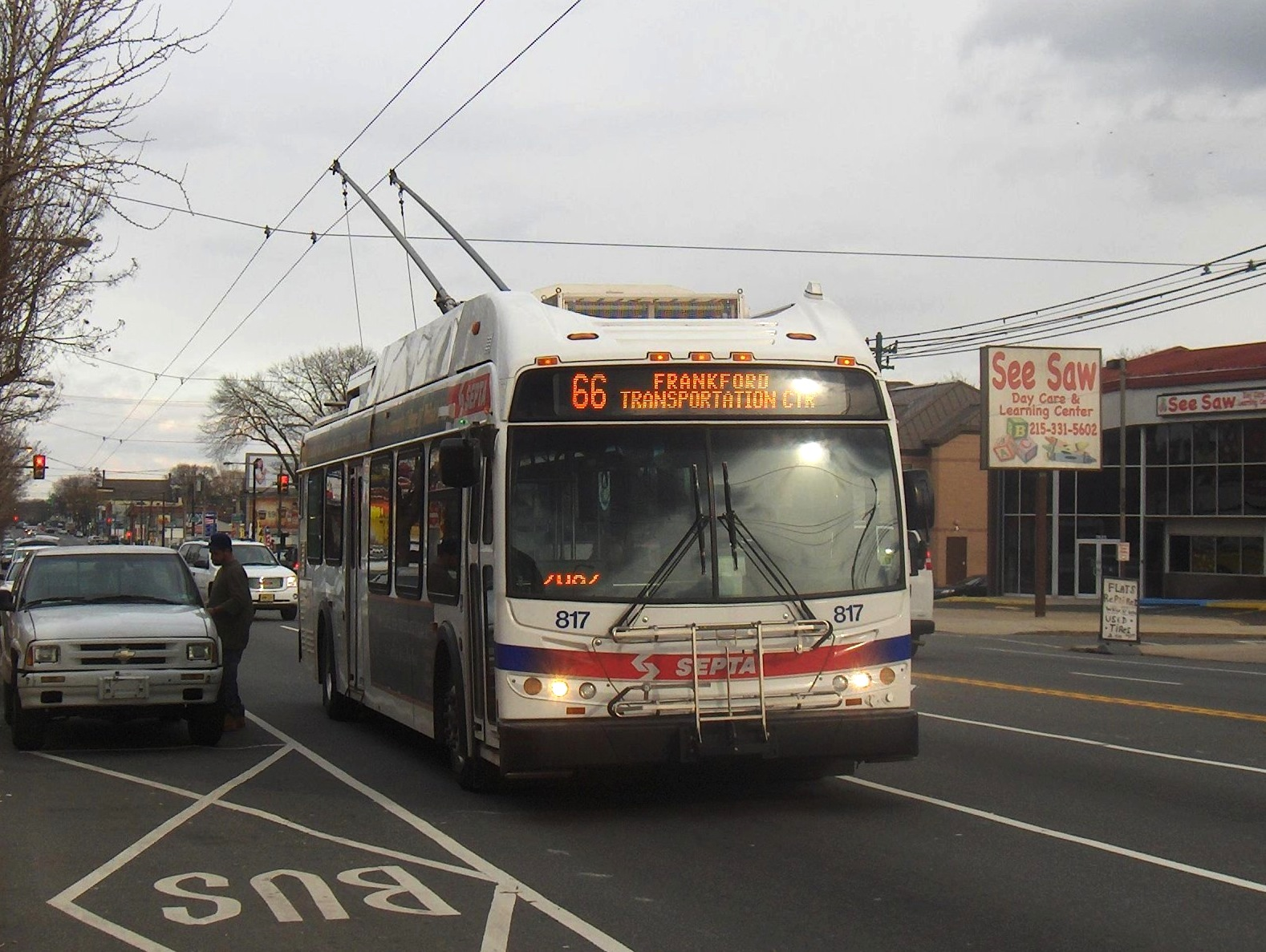
- Route 66 trackless trolley on the 7300 block of Frankford Avenue

Overview
- System: Frankford District
- Operator: SEPTA City Transit Division
- Began service: 1955 (trackless trolleys)

Route
- Locale: Philadelphia
- Communities served: Northeast Philadelphia
- Start: Frankford Transportation Center
- Via: Frankford Avenue
- End: Frankford Avenue & Knights Road (City Line Loop)
- Length: 6.1 miles (9.8 km)

Service
- Ridership: 8,950 (2019 weekday average)
- Annual patronage: 2,607,562 (FY2019)
- Timetable: Route 66 schedule
- Map: Route 66 map

Route 66 is a trackless trolley route operated by the Southeastern Pennsylvania Transportation Authority in Northeast Philadelphia, Pennsylvania, United States. It connects the Market–Frankford Line at the Frankford Transportation Center to Wissinoming, Mayfair, Holmesburg, and Torresdale along Frankford Avenue, which is US 13 and includes the historic, colonial Frankford Avenue Bridge. It is one of three surviving routes of the Philadelphia trolley bus system. From 1940 to 1968, the route was operated by the Philadelphia Transportation Company (PTC).

== Route description ==
The route's northern/eastern terminus is at City Line Loop, located at Frankford Avenue and Knights Road in Morrell Park. However, some weekday trips are truncated to Gregg Loop, located at Gregg Street and Frankford Avenue. Some weekday rush hour trips begin/end at Frankford and Cottman Avenue in the city's Mayfair neighborhood. The service includes express trips in rush hour, and additional sets of overhead wires to allow express trolley buses to pass 'local' (stopping) trolley buses have been in place for many years.

== History ==
Originally a streetcar line, Route 66 was converted to trolley buses (locally called trackless trolleys) in 1955. The last day of streetcar operation was July 30, 1955, and then diesel buses were temporarily used for six weeks, while work to modify the overhead wires for trolley buses took place. Trolley bus service began operating on the part of the route between Bridge Street Terminal (now known as Frankford Transit Center) and Gregg Street on September 11, 1955, and on October 2, 1955, the new trolley bus service was extended to City Line Loop, which has been the outer end of the line ever since.

In June 1961, PTC introduced express service on Route 66, initially in the northbound/outbound direction only, but with southbound express service added in September 1962. To facilitate this change, the company installed a reversible bus lane and additional sets of overhead trolley bus wires in the center of Frankford Avenue on a part of the route, to allow express trolley buses to pass vehicles serving all stops. One section had three sets of overhead wires (the center set for use by express trips) and another had four sets, and express trips operated only in the peak direction (inbound in the morning, outbound in the afternoon). In 1981, the route section between Frankford Terminal and St. Vincent Street was modified from three sets of wires to four, and an additional part of the route, farther out, was equipped with express wires, between Ryan Street and Rhawn Street. By 1998, use of the outer section of express wires had been reduced to just one trip per day, and in 2007 – when SEPTA was renewing the overhead wires in preparation for a resumption of trolley bus service on Route 66 after a suspension of more than five years – that set of express wires was removed, because there were no longer any Route 66 trips scheduled to operate as expresses on that section, beyond Ryan Street. The section of Frankford Avenue east of Cottman Avenue retained four sets of wires, the two inner sets used by express trolley buses.

Diesel buses were substituted beginning June 2002 because of reconstruction of Frankford Depot (garage) and the adjacent Market–Frankford "El" line (now known as the L line) viaduct and station, but trackless service was restored in April 2008.

All of the vehicles currently in use are ADA-compliant and equipped with bicycle racks. "Night Owl" service is also available, and rush hour service includes both local and express trips.

== See also ==
- Trolleybuses in Philadelphia

== Gallery ==
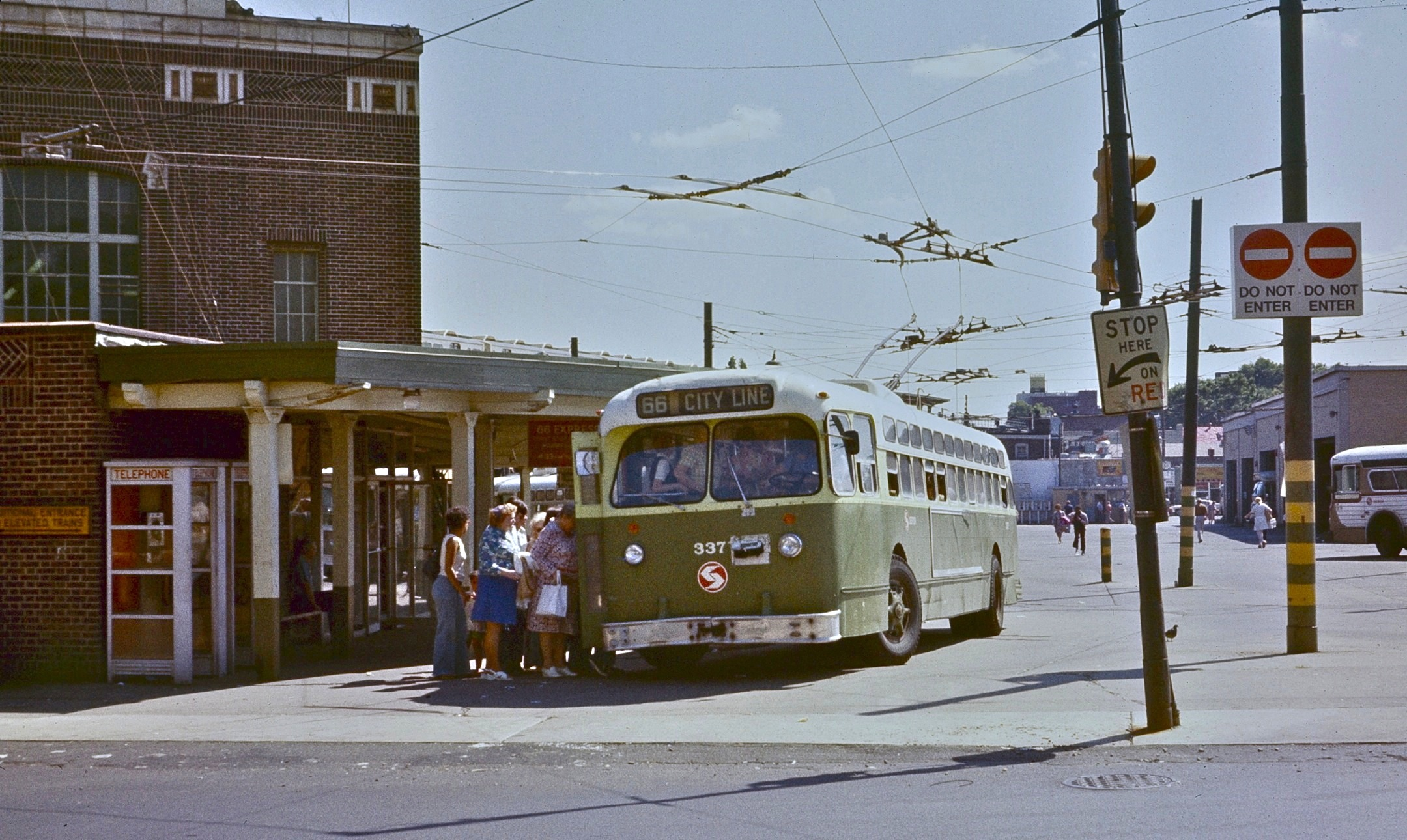
An older trackless trolley loading on route 66 in 1978
