= SEPTA Route 75 =

Trackless trolley line in Philadelphia, Pennsylvania

Route 75
- Wayne Junction to Arrott Transportation Center

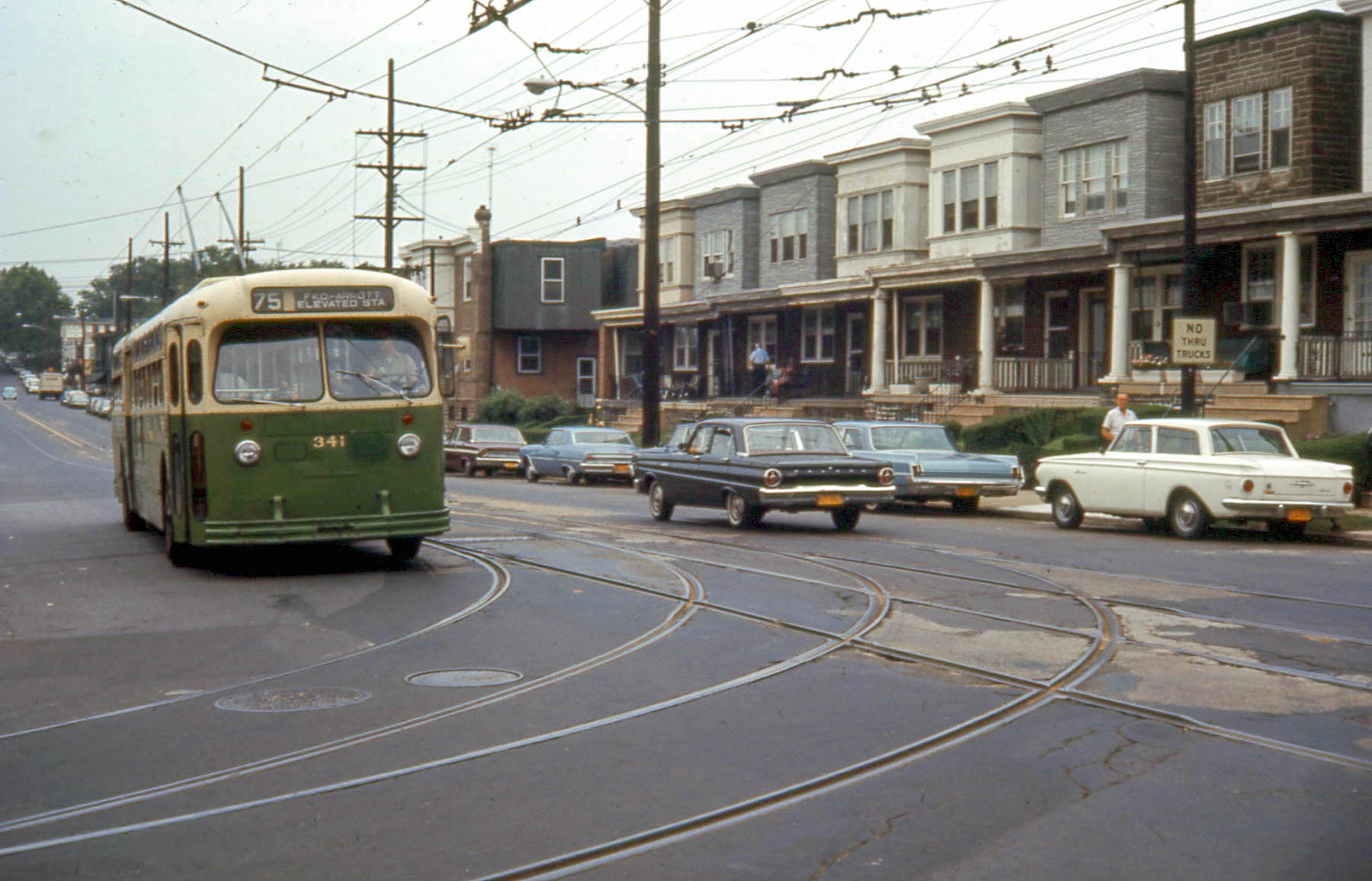
- Route 75 at 3rd & Wyoming in 1967, when the route was still operated by the Philadelphia Transportation Company. The tracks shown are for Route 50, which operated as a trolley until 1980.

Overview
- System: Frankford District
- Operator: SEPTA City Transit Division
- Began service: 1948 (trackless trolleys)

Route
- Locale: Philadelphia
- Communities served: Nicetown
- Start: Wayne Junction station
- Via: Wyoming Avenue
- End: Arrott Transportation Center

Service
- Ridership: 2,616 (2019 weekday average)
- Annual patronage: 758,034 (FY2019)
- Timetable: Route 75 schedule
- Map: Route 75 map

Route 75 is a trackless trolley route operated by SEPTA in North and Northeast Philadelphia, Pennsylvania, United States. It connects to the Market–Frankford Line (now known as the L line) at Arrott Transportation Center Station, and runs primarily along Wyoming Avenue. Route 75 connects to the Wyoming (BSL station) local line and goes to Wayne Junction in Nicetown. It is one of three surviving routes of the Philadelphia trolley bus system.

== Route description ==
The route is operated by trolleybuses, locally called trackless trolleys, which replaced streetcars (trolley cars) on the route on April 19, 1948, following one day of temporary bus operation. As far back as 1922, the President of Philadelphia Rapid Transit recommended converting the route into a feeder route for the Market-Frankford Line. The route originally continued east from Margaret-Orthodox elevated station to Richmond Street, in the Bridesburg neighborhood, but the last day of operation to Bridesburg was April 2, 1966.

All of the vehicles currently in use are ADA-compliant, and equipped with bicycle racks. Diesel buses temporarily replaced trackless trolleys on route 75 in June 2002, but trackless service was restored in April 2008.

== See also ==
- Trolleybuses in Philadelphia
