= SEPTA Route 59 =

Route 59
- Castor–Bustleton to Arrott Transportation Center

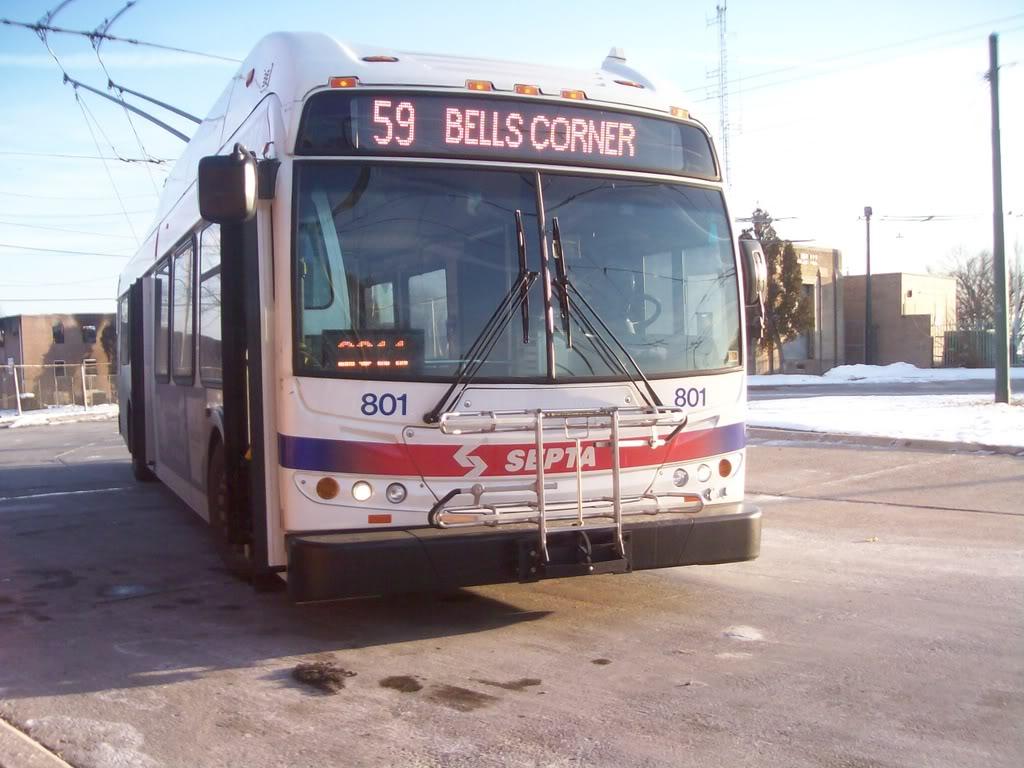
- Route 59 trackless trolley en route to Bells Corner

Overview
- System: Frankford District
- Operator: SEPTA City Transit Division
- Began service: 1950 (trackless trolleys)

Route
- Locale: Philadelphia
- Communities served: Northeast Philadelphia
- Start: Bells Corner Loop (Castor and Bustleton Avenues)
- Via: Castor Avenue, Oxford Avenue
- End: Arrott Transportation Center
- Length: 4.1 miles (6.6 km)

Service
- Journey time: 17 minutes
- Ridership: 4,068 (2019 weekday average)
- Annual patronage: 1,182,018 (FY2019)
- Timetable: Route 59 schedule
- Map: Route 59 map

Route 59 is a trackless trolley line operated by SEPTA that runs from the Market–Frankford Line (now known as the L line) at Arrott Transportation Center Station to Bells Corner in Rhawnhurst, primarily along Oxford and Castor Avenues. Major stops along the route include Oxford Circle and the Alma Loop in Castor, which is near a shopping center and a junior high and senior high school. It is one of three surviving routes of the Philadelphia trolley bus system.

The trackless trolleys (or trolleybuses) replaced trolley cars (streetcars) on the route on in June 25, 1950.

Diesel buses temporarily replaced trackless trolleys on route 59 in June 2002, because of reconstruction of Frankford Depot (garage) and the adjacent Market-Frankford "El" viaduct and station, which required the temporary removal of the overhead trolley wires used by trackless trolleys both at the garage and along the deadhead route (under the El viaduct) connecting route 59 to the garage. However, trackless service was restored in April 2008. All of the vehicles currently in use are ADA-compliant and equipped with bicycle racks.

== See also ==
- Trolleybuses in Philadelphia
