= Frankford Transit Center =

Passenger transportation center in Philadelphia

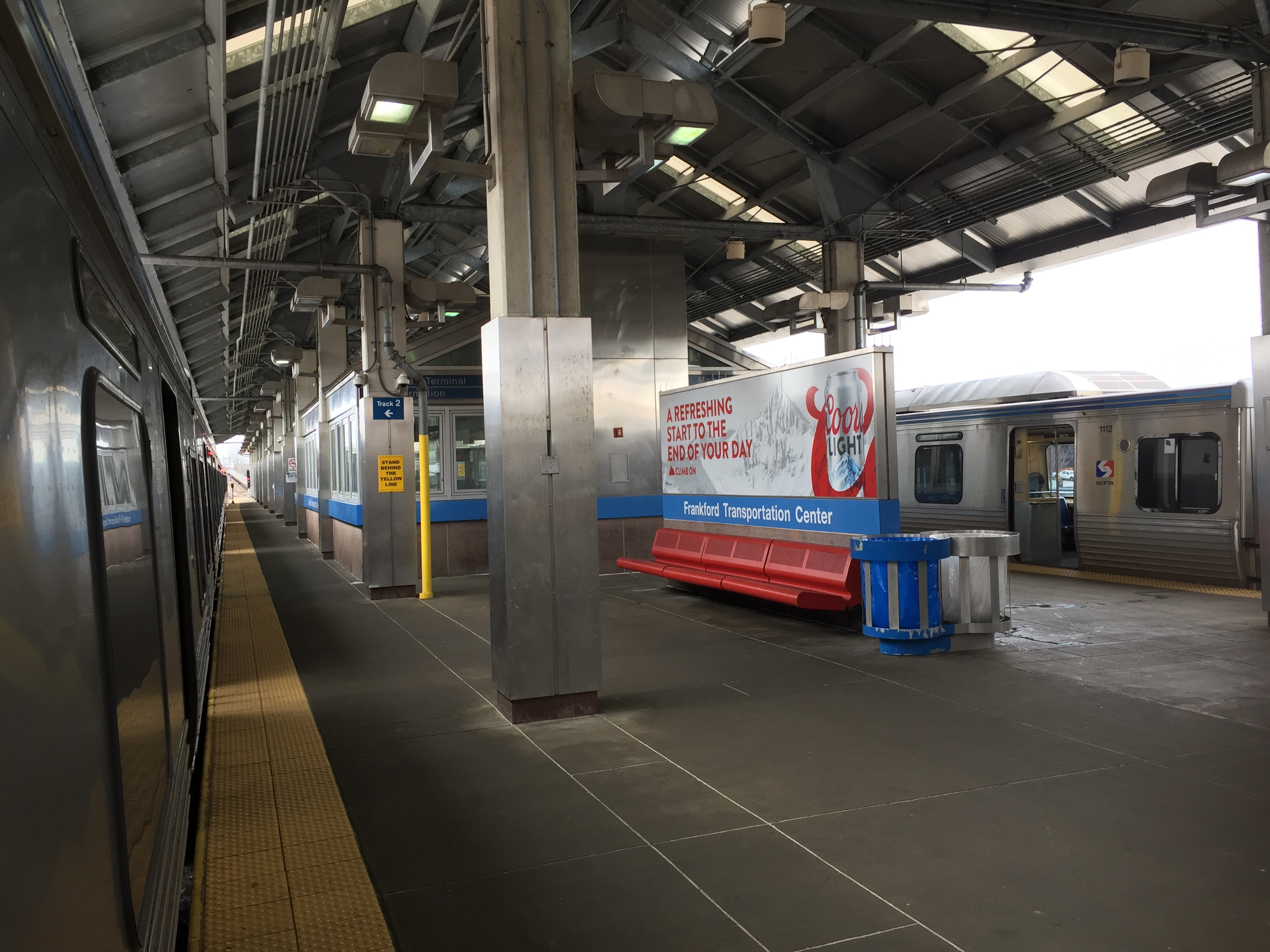
- Frankford Transit Center platform

General information
- Location: 5233 Frankford Avenue; Philadelphia, Pennsylvania
- Coordinates: 40°01′24″N 75°04′37″W
- Owner: SEPTA
- Platforms: 1 island platform
- Tracks: 2
- Connections: SEPTA City Bus: 3, 5, 8, 14, 19, 20, 24, 25, 26, 50, 58, 67, 72, 73, 82, 84, 88, Boulevard Direct; SEPTA City Bus: 66

Construction
- Structure type: Elevated
- Parking: 989 spaces
- Accessible: Yes

History
- Opened: November 5, 1922
- Rebuilt: 1986, 2003–2006
- Former names: Bridge–Pratt (1922–2003); Frankford Transportation Center (2003–2025)

Services
Preceding station	SEPTA Metro	Following station
Arrott T.C. toward 69th Street T.C.	L (SEPTA Metro)	Terminus
Location

Frankford Transit Center is a transportation terminal in the Frankford section of Philadelphia, Pennsylvania, United States. It was known as the Bridge–Pratt station until 2003, then as Frankford Transportation Center until 2025. The station was completely reconstructed from 2003 to 2006. Frankford Transit Center is the eastern terminus of the SEPTA Metro's L service as well as a terminal for SEPTA bus routes. Trains heading westbound terminate at 69th Street Transit Center.

== Services ==
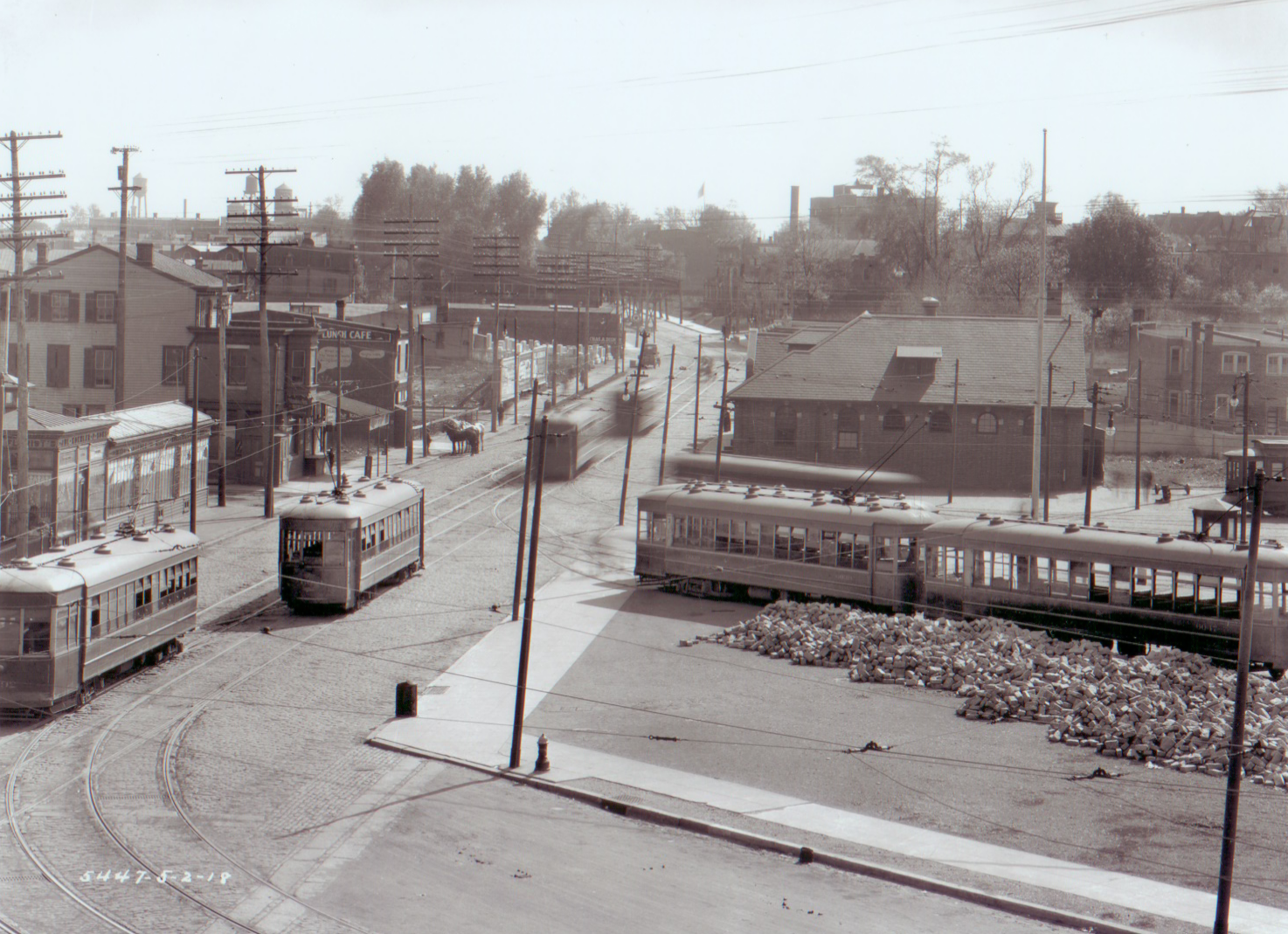
Frankford Terminal in 1918, before the construction of the L

Frankford Transit Center is a terminal for many SEPTA bus routes and serves as the eastern terminus of the L, a subway-elevated rapid transit line run by SEPTA.
