= Philadelphia Transportation Company =

Philadelphia public transit operator (1940-1968)

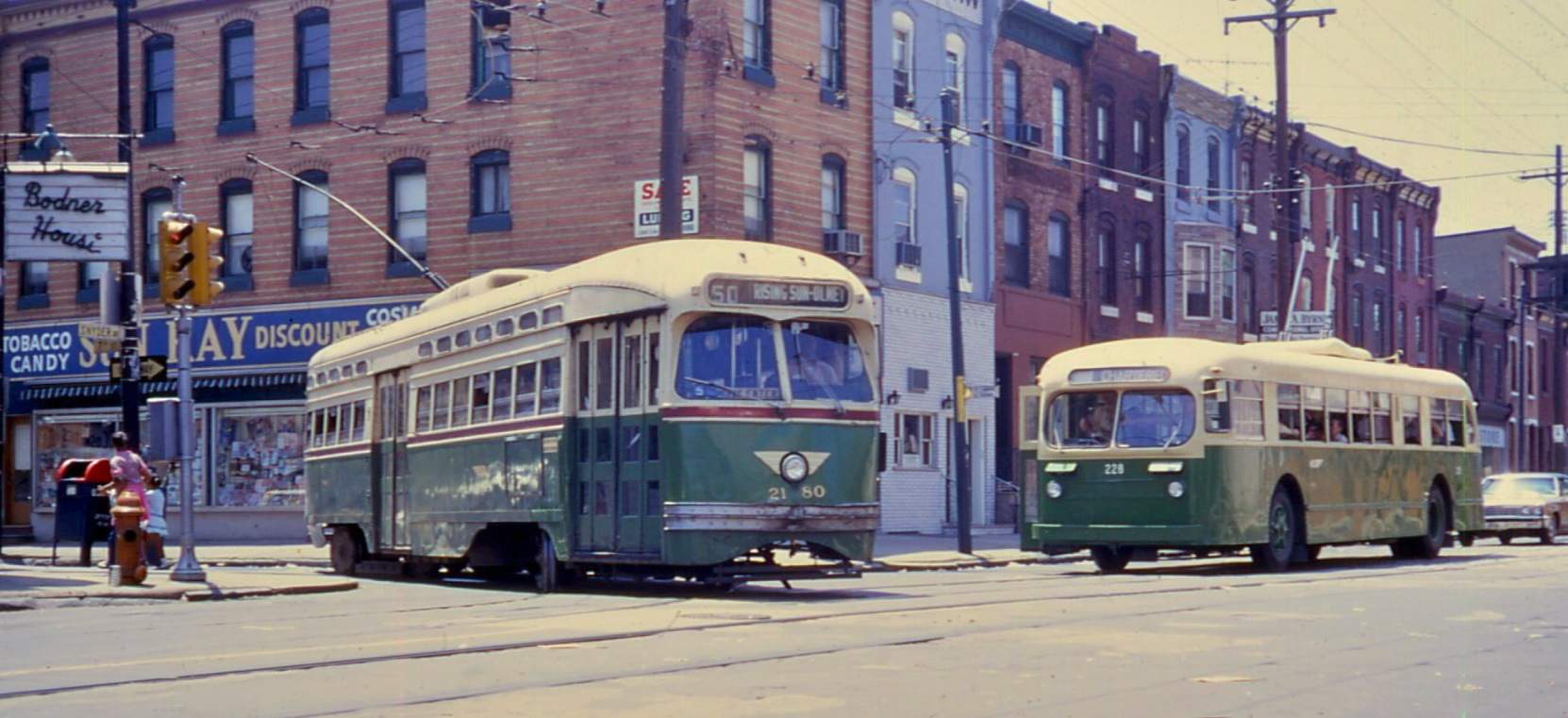
- A PCC-type trolley and a Brill trackless trolley of PTC, wearing the company's standard paint scheme of green-and-cream in 1968 at 7th Street & Snyder Avenue

Overview
- Locale: Philadelphia, Pennsylvania, U.S.
- Transit type: Rapid transit; Trolley/Streetcar; Motor bus; Trolley bus
- Headquarters: 200 W. Wyoming Avenue, Philadelphia, Pennsylvania

Operation
- Began operation: January 1, 1940
- Ended operation: September 30, 1968 (taken over by SEPTA)

Technical
- Track gauge: 4 ft 8 1/2 in (1,435 mm) (Broad Street Subway); 5 ft 2 1/4 in (1,581 mm) (streetcar/trolley lines and Market–Frankford Line)

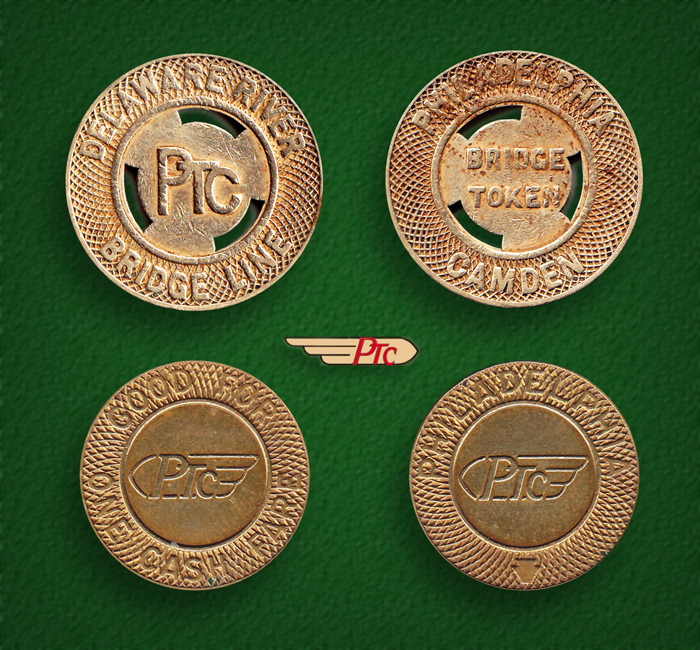
PTC fare tokens

The Philadelphia Transportation Company (PTC) was the main public transit operator in Philadelphia, Pennsylvania, from 1940 to 1968. It operated a citywide system of bus, trolley, and trackless trolley (trolleybus) routes, the Market-Frankford Elevated (now L), the Broad Street subway (now B), and Delaware River Bridge Line (now PATCO Speedline).

A private company, PTC was the successor to the Philadelphia Rapid Transit Company (PRT), in operation since 1902, and was the immediate predecessor of the Southeastern Pennsylvania Transportation Authority (SEPTA). Organizationally, its legacy continues as SEPTA's City Transit Division.

== History ==
The earliest predecessors to the PTC were an extensive network of independent and competing horsecar lines that carpeted the city and nearby suburbs shortly after the Civil War. These generally ran every few minutes at speeds comparable to walking pace, but saved the effort.

In general, streetcar lines in the city attempted to route through the central business district. Towards this end, several operated in an "L" shape, such traveling north/south on one radial into Center City, and then east/west on the other. The majority of the lines were single track in the city and ran in one direction, due to the narrow street widths. A rare exception was the double track along 8th Street in Center City, around which developed the city's shopping district.

During the late 19th century, the horsecar lines were replaced first by cable cars and then, in the 1890s, electrified trolleys. The greater capital investment required by these latter systems prompted corporate consolidation, and eventually all the city's street railroads were unified into the Union Traction Company (UTC) in 1895.

The UTC also unified the city's transfer system, such that the first streetcar ride on any line cost 5¢ (the regulatory maximum; $2 in 2025 money), but transferring to the next streetcar cost only 3¢. As the transfer passes had no expiration date, passengers would buy large blocks for future use, and the policy worked similarly to a fare reduction to 4¢ for the diligent commuter.

The new UTC was affiliated with local grandees, but extremely unpopular with the general public. During an 1895 conductors' strike, non-workers supported the strikers with violence, vandalism, and a boycott of the limited operations the company could put together with strikebreakers. Following a change in local politics, the city attempted to break the UTC's monopoly in 1901, awarding franchises for grade-separated rapid transit lines to entrants affiliated with the new administration. Instead, the UTC bought out the new companies, forming the Philadelphia Rapid Transit Company (PRT) to operate all forms of public transit in the city.

In 1907, the PRT built the first portion of modern Philadelphia's rapid transit system: the Market Street Elevated. By 1911, improvements to service had made the PRT relatively popular. Part of PRT's newfound popularity arose from an investment in new rolling stock, including the custom-designed Nearside streetcar. In the 1910s, the PRT began trialing motorized buses to supplement or replace its trolley services.

The 1920s were turbulent for the PRT. The city's rapid transit system expanded with the Market Street line's Frankford Extension, and the PRT broke ground on the incipient Broad Street Subway. Nevertheless, "knowledgeable people noted that the money from trolley operations was drying up." As early as 1919, President Thomas E. Mittens had begun attempting to remove financiers from the PRT's board of directors. In 1925, Mittens, threatening bankruptcy, first obtained a fare increase to 8¢. Then, he attempted to extort the Philadelphia Electric Company, which supplied PRT most of its power, into a merger or lowered electric rates, by opposing regulatory approval of the Conowingo Dam.

PTC was established on January 1, 1940, by the merger of the PRT and several smaller, then-independent transit companies operating in and near the city. PTC operated the rapid transit lines in Philadelphia, principally the Market–Frankford, Broad Street, and Delaware River Bridge Lines, leasing their fixed infrastructure from the City of Philadelphia. PTC's network also included the Philadelphia trolleybus system, which was much smaller, along with numerous bus lines.

Suburban transit lines at the time were operated by other private companies, including the Philadelphia Suburban Transportation Company, known as Red Arrow Lines (now D (SEPTA Metro)), the Southern Penn Bus Company (various bus lines), and the Philadelphia and Western Railroad (Norristown and Strafford interurban lines).

Among PTC's first actions was to begin replacing its aging fleet of vehicles. In 1940, the company placed orders for 130 PCC streetcars, 50 trackless trolleys, and 53 motor buses.

In 1944, during World War II, white PTC workers engaged in a wildcat strike aimed at preventing the promotion of African American employees to conductors and other positions. The strike ended when President Franklin D. Roosevelt ordered troops into the city to run the cars.

In 1955, majority control of PTC was acquired by the National City Lines holding company, which had a record of replacing trolleys with buses in other cities. NCL followed suit in Philadelphia. In 1954, the PTC trolley system included 45 lines, using more than 1,500 trolley cars. Between 1954 and 1958, three-fourths of the trolley lines were abandoned, and 984 trolley cars had been scrapped, replaced by 1,000 new buses. In the year 1956 alone, Philadelphia Electric estimated that revenue from PTC declined 16% due to the substitution of new gasoline-powered vehicles.

The Southeastern Pennsylvania Transportation Authority (SEPTA) was established in 1964, as part of efforts by the Pennsylvania legislature to coordinate government subsidies to various transit and railroad companies in southeastern Pennsylvania. The provision of public transit service was becoming increasingly unprofitable in the 1950s and 1960s, and cities across the country were municipalizing their transit systems or creating regional public transit authorities. SEPTA acquired the Philadelphia Transportation Company, taking possession of PTC at noon on September 30, 1968. The total price paid to PTC stockholders for the purchase was $47.9 million (equivalent to $338 million in 2025).

== See also ==
- Transportation in Philadelphia
