= Transportation in Philadelphia =

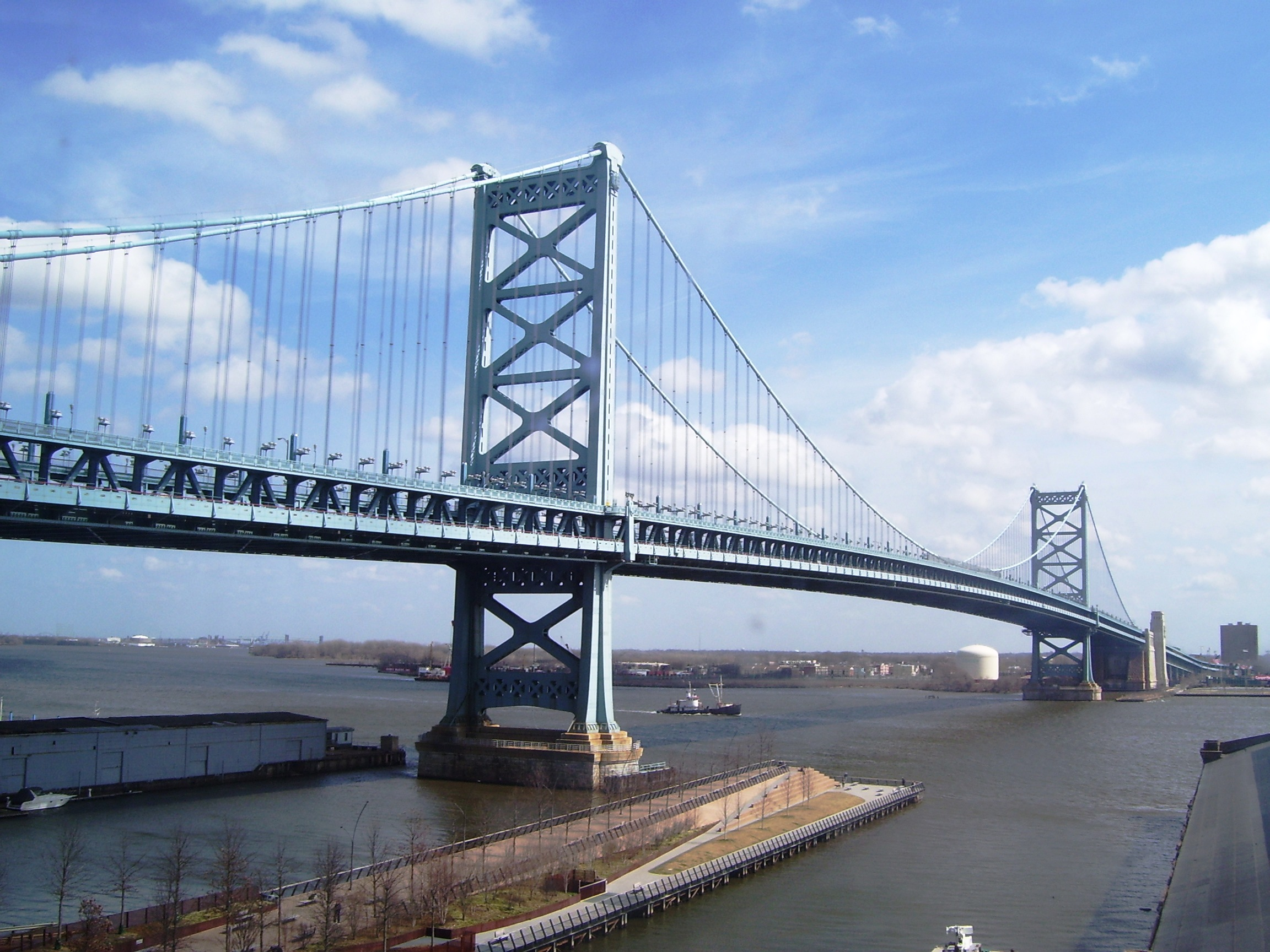
Benjamin Franklin Bridge, once the world's longest suspension span, connects Philadelphia with Camden, New Jersey.

Transportation in Philadelphia involves the various modes of transport within the city and its required infrastructure. In addition to facilitating intracity travel, Philadelphia's transportation system connects Philadelphia to towns of its metropolitan area and surrounding areas within the Northeast megalopolis.

The city is crossed by the Delaware Expressway (Interstate 95 or I-95) and the Schuylkill Expressway (I-76), which are the principal thoroughfares for intercity traffic. The Vine Street Expressway (I-676) travels between I-76 and I-95 in Center City Philadelphia, and the Roosevelt Boulevard (U.S. Route 1) carries crosstown traffic in northern Philadelphia.

Philadelphia's public transit system is mainly operated by SEPTA, which maintains an extensive system utilizing buses, rapid transit, commuter rail, trolleys, and the Philadelphia trackless trolley (trolleybus) system. The main rail station of Philadelphia is 30th Street Station, which has access to 13 SEPTA Regional Rail routes and 11 Amtrak intercity rail routes. Philadelphia International Airport, the primary airport of Philadelphia, is a hub for domestic and international aviation.

== Roads ==
=== Streets ===
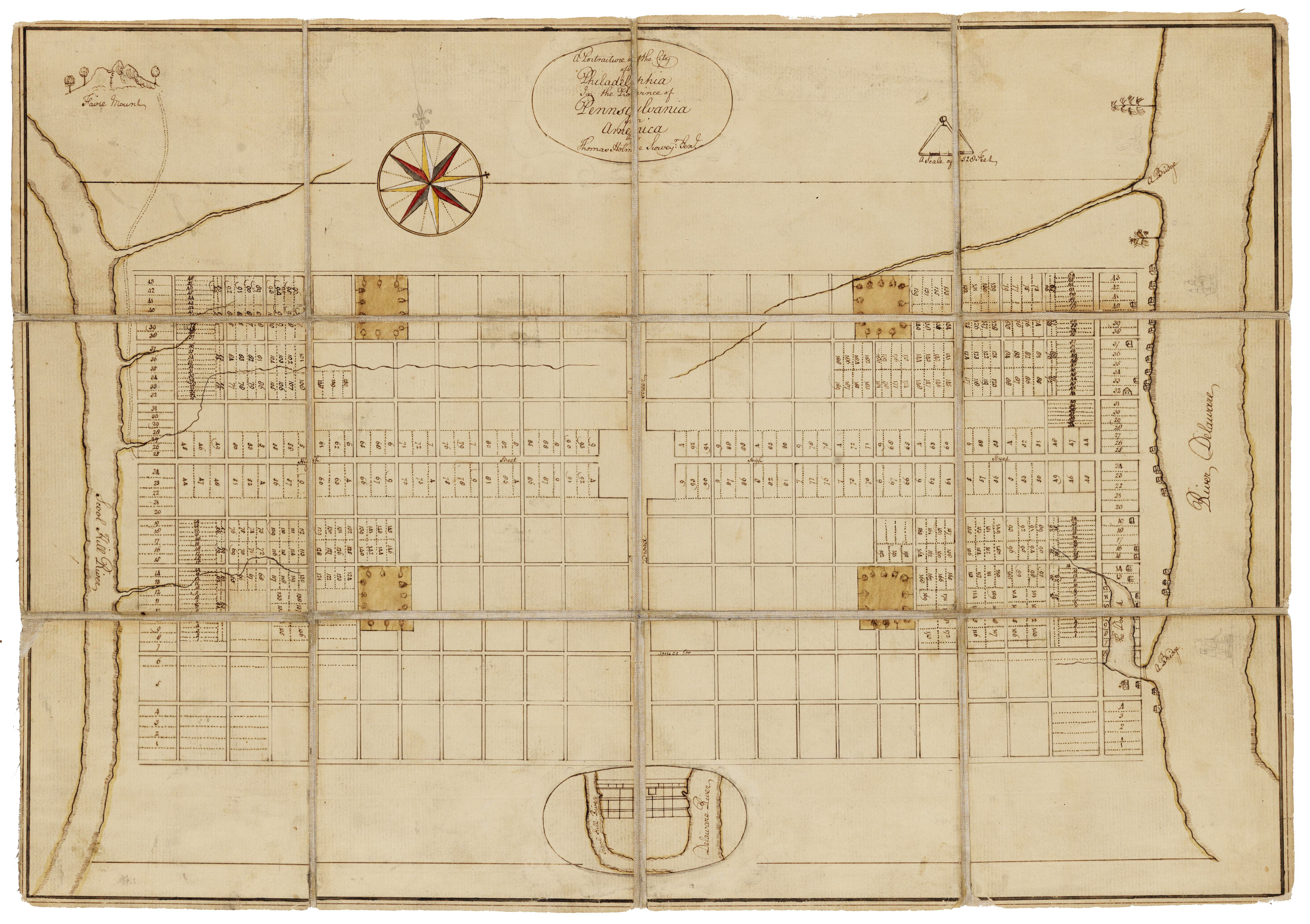
Thomas Holme's A Portraiture of Philadelphia, published in 1682, displays the rectilinear grid layout of Philadelphia's streets.

The streets of Philadelphia mainly follow a grid plan, one of the first such layouts used in a North American city. The grid plan originated in 1682, when William Penn founded Philadelphia and appointed Thomas Holme as his surveyor. Using 1,200 acres (4.9 km^{2}), Penn planned a system of organized streets to facilitate future growth. Since Penn survived the Great Fire of London and wanted to avoid similar catastrophes, he laid out streets wider than usual. Penn planned the city to stretch between the Delaware and Schuylkill Rivers, and his grid plan of present-day Center City followed a 22-by-8-block pattern. The plan included a large square in the center of the town (the present-day location of Philadelphia City Hall), and four public squares near each corner of the city.

Since the initial grid covered only the area of present-day Center City, other settlements such as Kensington developed using different grids. The grid system was gradually extended to other regions of present-day Philadelphia, although several roads predating a grid system still exist. Certain neighborhoods of Philadelphia, such as those in the Far Northeast, do not use grid systems.

When William Penn designed the street grid for the city, he named the east–west streets after trees, four of which have since been named, and the north–south streets using numbers. Major Center City streets include Broad Street, Front Street, Locust Street, and Market Street.

The naming system of the streets differs by neighborhood, although the main north–south streets are numbered in South Philadelphia, West Philadelphia, and Lower North Philadelphia similarly to how they are numbered in Center City. On South Philadelphia, east–west streets use the surnames of former governors of Pennsylvania, starting with Reed Street and ending with Pattison Avenue. Several east–west streets in North Philadelphia are named after counties in Pennsylvania. Other streets are named after locally or nationally significant people. During the 20th century, several streets were renamed to honor individuals, such as John F. Kennedy Boulevard, named in tribute of former U.S. president John F. Kennedy.

The system for assigning street addresses was enacted in 1858. In areas with a consistent grid, the street address numbers increase by an interval of 100 for each block, starting with Front Street for east–west streets and Market Street for north–south streets. For example, 1200 South Street would refer to the intersection of 12th & South Street, and 500 North 17th Street is 5 blocks north of Market Street.

=== Expressways ===
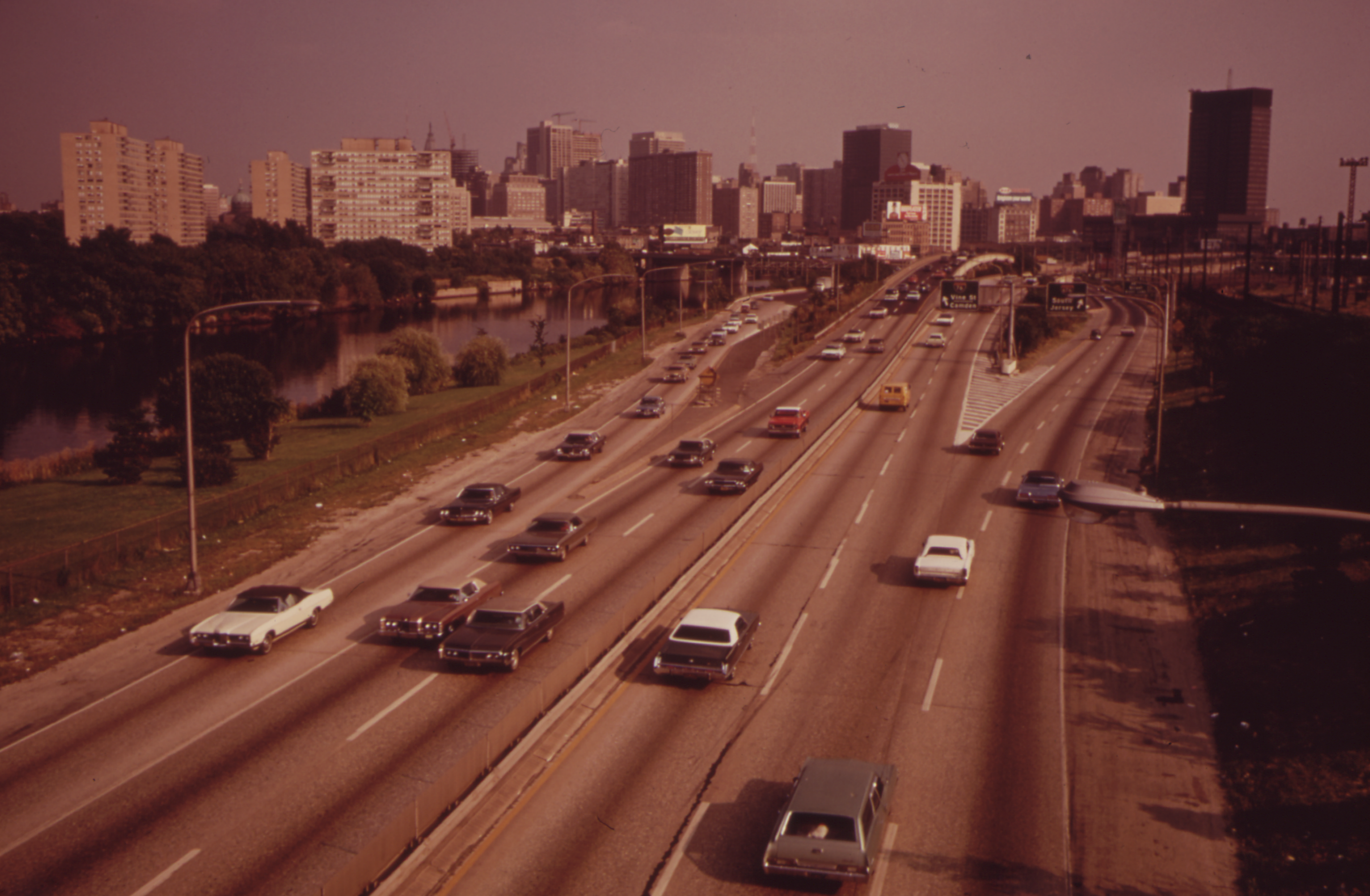
I-76 and I-676 split, 1973

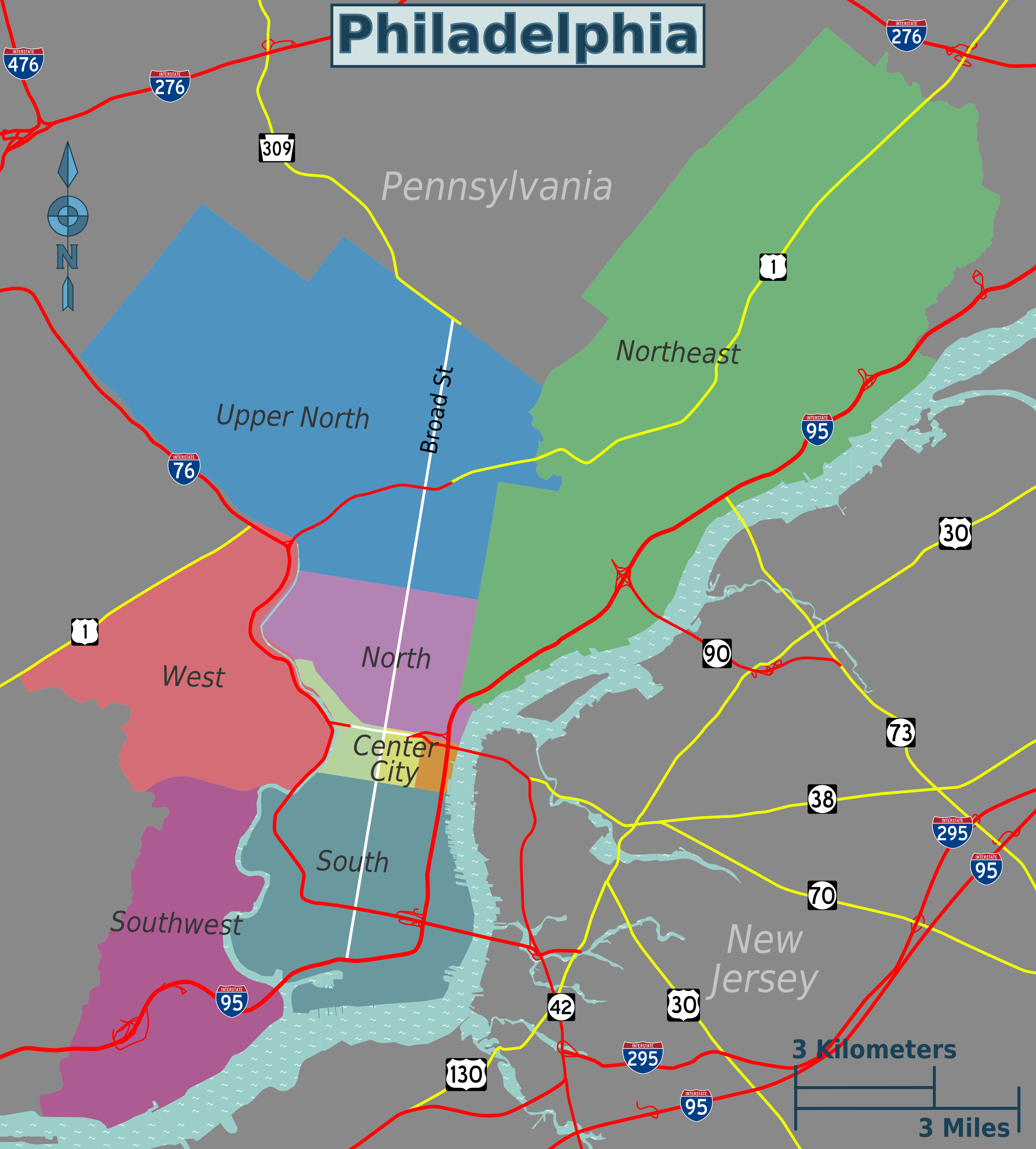
Map showing major highways with Philadelphia districts and its surrounding region

The main expressways of Philadelphia are the Delaware Expressway (I-95), which travels along the Delaware River, and the Schuylkill Expressway (I-76), paralleling the Schuylkill River for most of its route. Other expressways are the Vine Street Expressway (I-676), running between the Schuylkill Expressway and the Delaware Expressway through downtown Philadelphia; the Roosevelt Expressway (US 1), a freeway portion of Roosevelt Boulevard; and Woodhaven Road, an expressway connecting to I-95 to the south.

=== Bridges ===
==== Delaware River ====
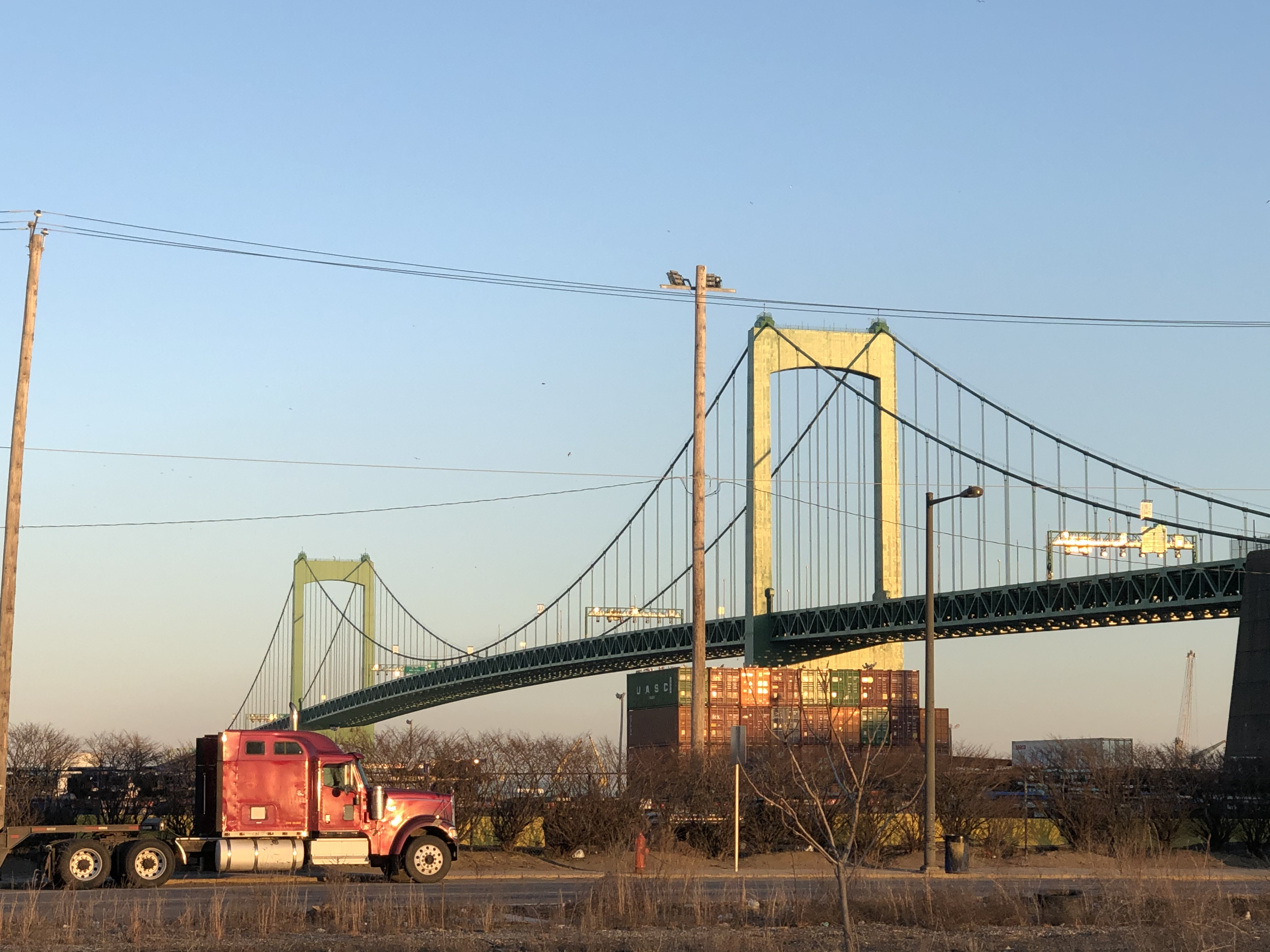
The Walt Whitman Bridge, the longest of several bridges linking Philadelphia and South Jersey

Philadelphia is connected to South Jersey across the Delaware River by four bridges, three of which are maintained by the Delaware River Port Authority. The oldest is the Benjamin Franklin Bridge, which opened in 1926, and was the world's longest suspension bridge span until the opening of the Ambassador Bridge in 1929. The Benjamin Franklin Bridge connects Camden, New Jersey with Center City, thus making it a main crossing between Philadelphia and New Jersey. The Benjamin Franklin Bridge carries seven lanes of roadway, two rail lines of the PATCO Speedline, and two pedestrian walkways.

The longest bridge between Philadelphia and New Jersey is the Walt Whitman Bridge, which connects South Philadelphia to Gloucester City, New Jersey. The Walt Whitman Bridge opened in 1957, with a total length of 11,981 feet (3,652 m) and main span length of 2,000 feet (610 m). The bridge carries seven lanes of I-76, and carries approximately 120,000 vehicles per day.

Connecting to Northeast Philadelphia are the Betsy Ross Bridge, a six-lane bridge linking the Bridesburg neighborhood of Philadelphia with Pennsauken, New Jersey, and the Tacony–Palmyra Bridge, a three-lane drawbridge spanning the Delaware River between the Tacony neighborhood of Philadelphia and Palmyra, New Jersey.

==== Schuylkill River ====
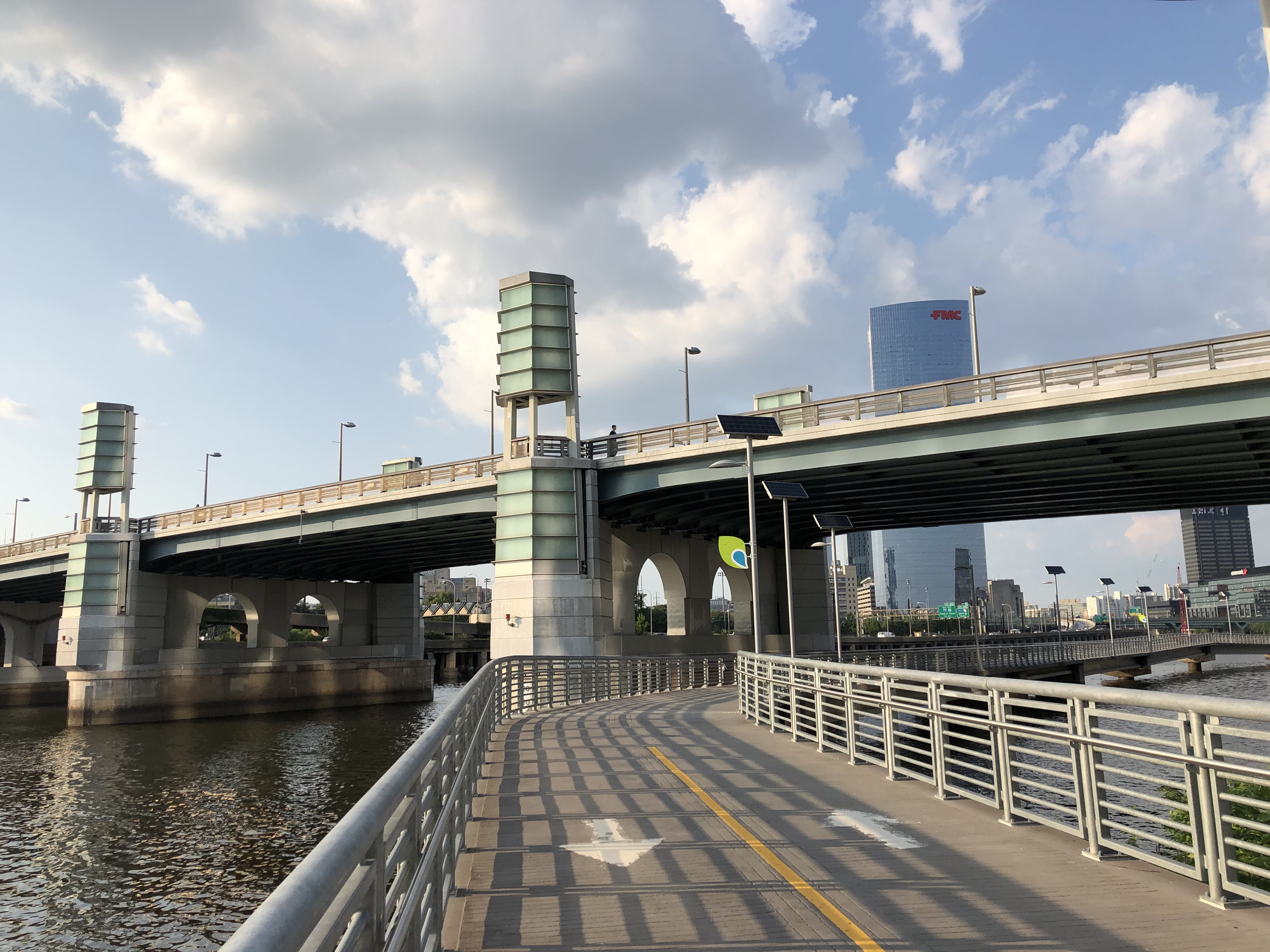
The South Street Bridge links University City with Center City.

The Schuylkill River, a main tributary of the Delaware River, is crossed by 20 roads in Philadelphia. The oldest bridges were built and operated by private companies, and were initially wooden until the advent of iron and steel bridges. The Market Street Bridge, opened in 1805, was the first permanent bridge across the Schuylkill River. West Philadelphia has many bridges spanning the Schuylkill River, including three expressways. University City is connected to Center City by five surface roads.

== Pedestrians and bicycling ==
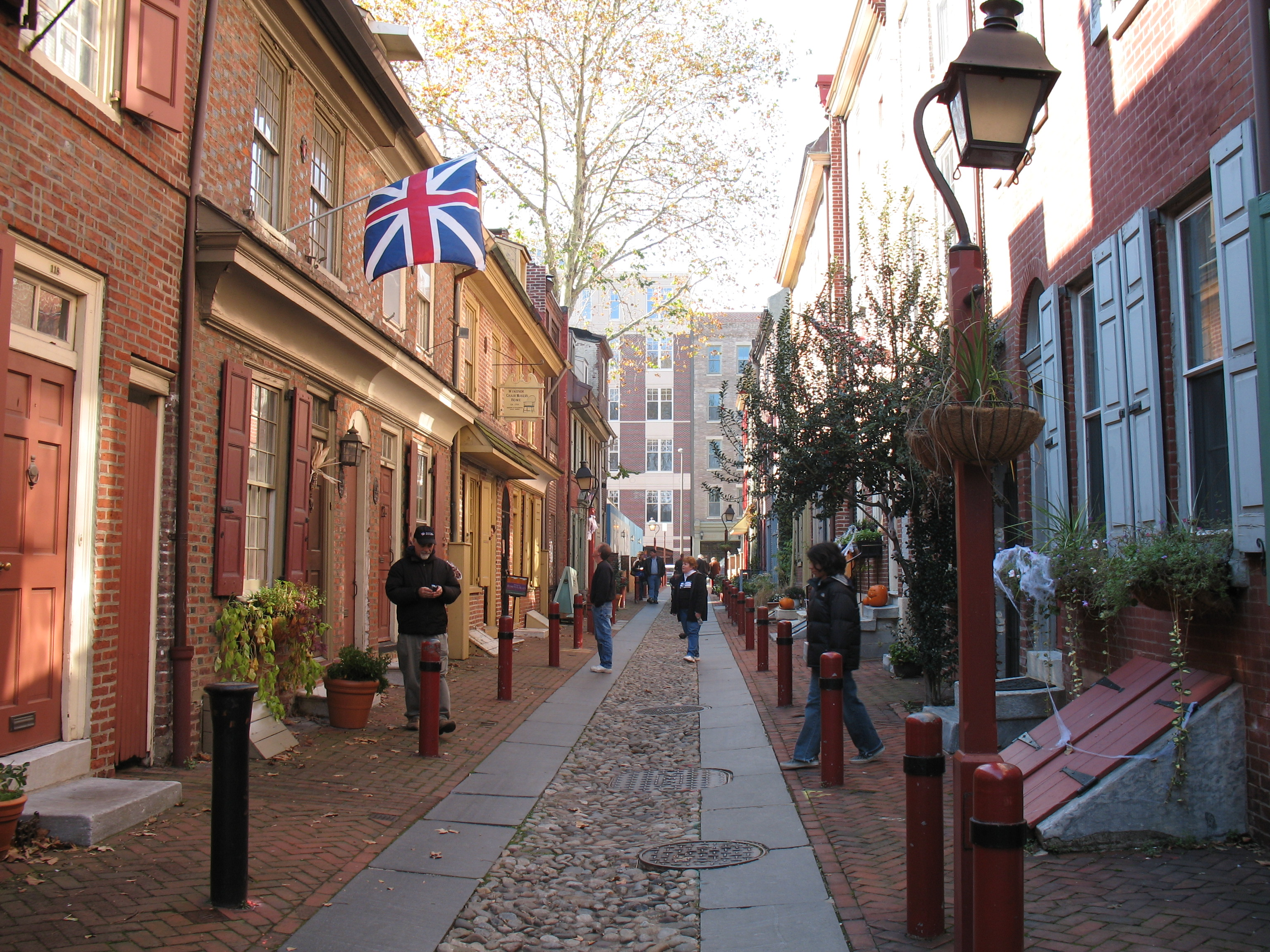
Elfreth's Alley, one of the oldest continuously inhabited residential streets in the country

Like most larger American cities built out well before WWII, Philadelphia has a densely packed, highly walkable urban core, surrounded primarily by suburbs where single-family homes predominate. It was also an early innovator in that respect: Philly's well-known Main Line suburbs were constructed in tandem with the completion of the Main Line railroad connecting the suburbs with Center City, though at the time the Main Line primarily served as a "country home" destination for the urban elite. The city's SEPTA public transportation network offers a variety of transit options, including subways, buses, trolleys, and commuter rail. As of 2019, Philadelphia was the second-most traffic-congested city in the U.S.

Unlike other major East Coast cities, such as New York City and Boston, Center City Philadelphia, originally the core of Philadelphia's white-collar workforce, has seen a marked decline in jobs, as companies have gradually relocated to the suburbs. As of 2019, Center City had approximately 180,000 daily commuters from the suburbs. Center City had 23% fewer jobs as of 2021 than it did in 1970. Further, an even larger percentage of Philadelphia's population reverse-commutes to jobs in the suburbs; as of 2018, at least 260,000 people did so each week, and 41% of the city's population is employed in its suburbs.

In 2020 and 2021, SEPTA ridership plummeted 85% as a result of quarantining and stay-at-home orders. While its ridership increased significantly in 2022, SEPTA still has less than half of its annual pre-COVID ridership.

Unlike most other large American cities, Philadelphia has no network of dockless e-scooters available to rent. The city has greatly expanded its network of bike lanes, however, and its Indego docked-bike sharing network – which debuted in 2015 with 60 stations and 600 bikes – now has 213 stations and a total of 2,200 bikes, including some electric-assist versions introduced in 2019.

=== Underground transit concourse ===
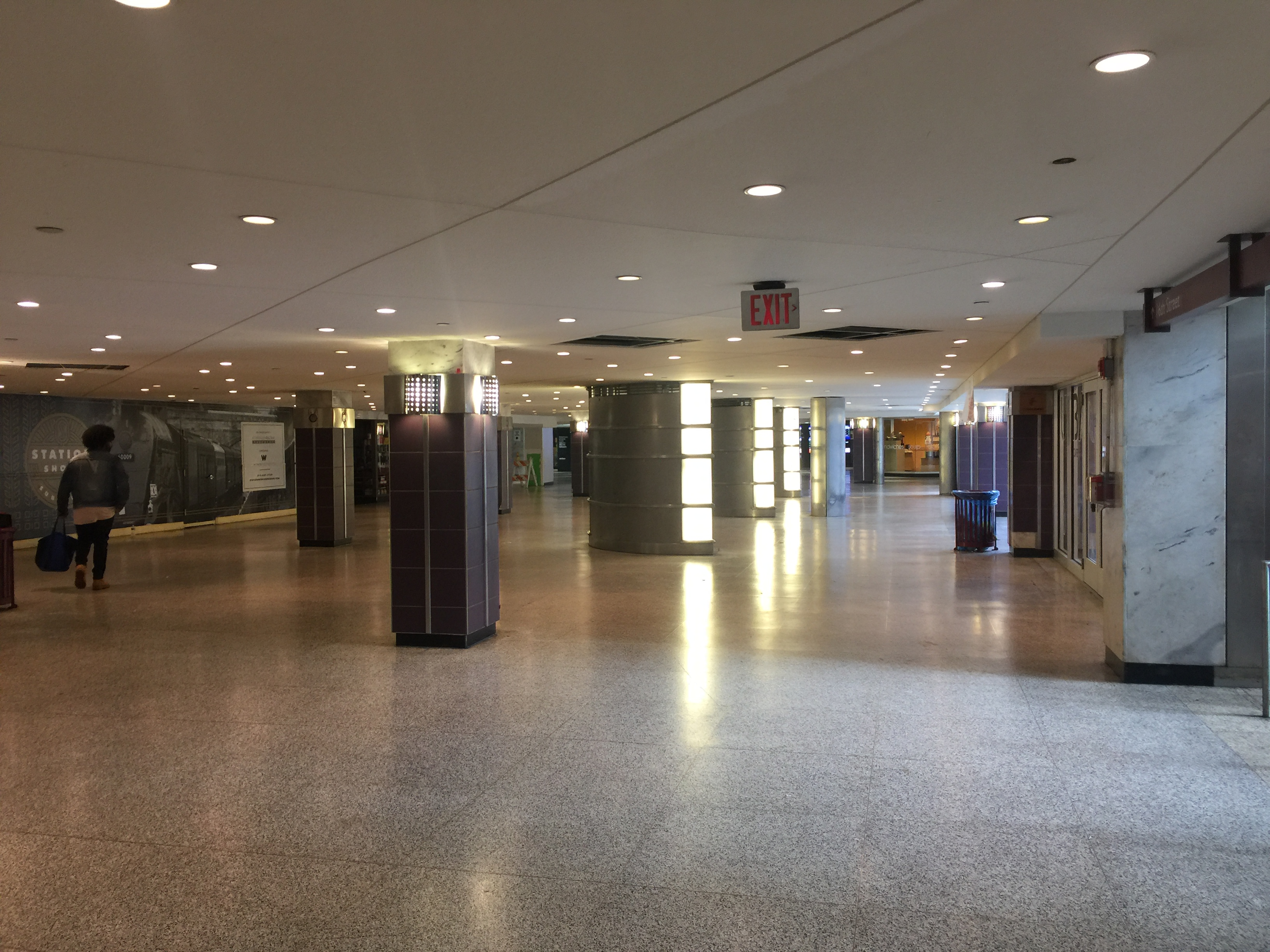
The underground concourse near Suburban Station

Philadelphia has a 3.5-mile (5.6 km) underground transit concourse in Center City, which connects the SEPTA Regional Rail lines with local rail and trolley lines. Throughout the entire concourse are underground entrances to adjacent buildings, as well as the "MetroMarket", a group of small shops and eateries near Suburban Station. Within the underground concourse, it is possible to walk between 8th Street & Market and 18th Street & JFK Boulevard, or from City Hall to Locust Street.

=== Trails ===
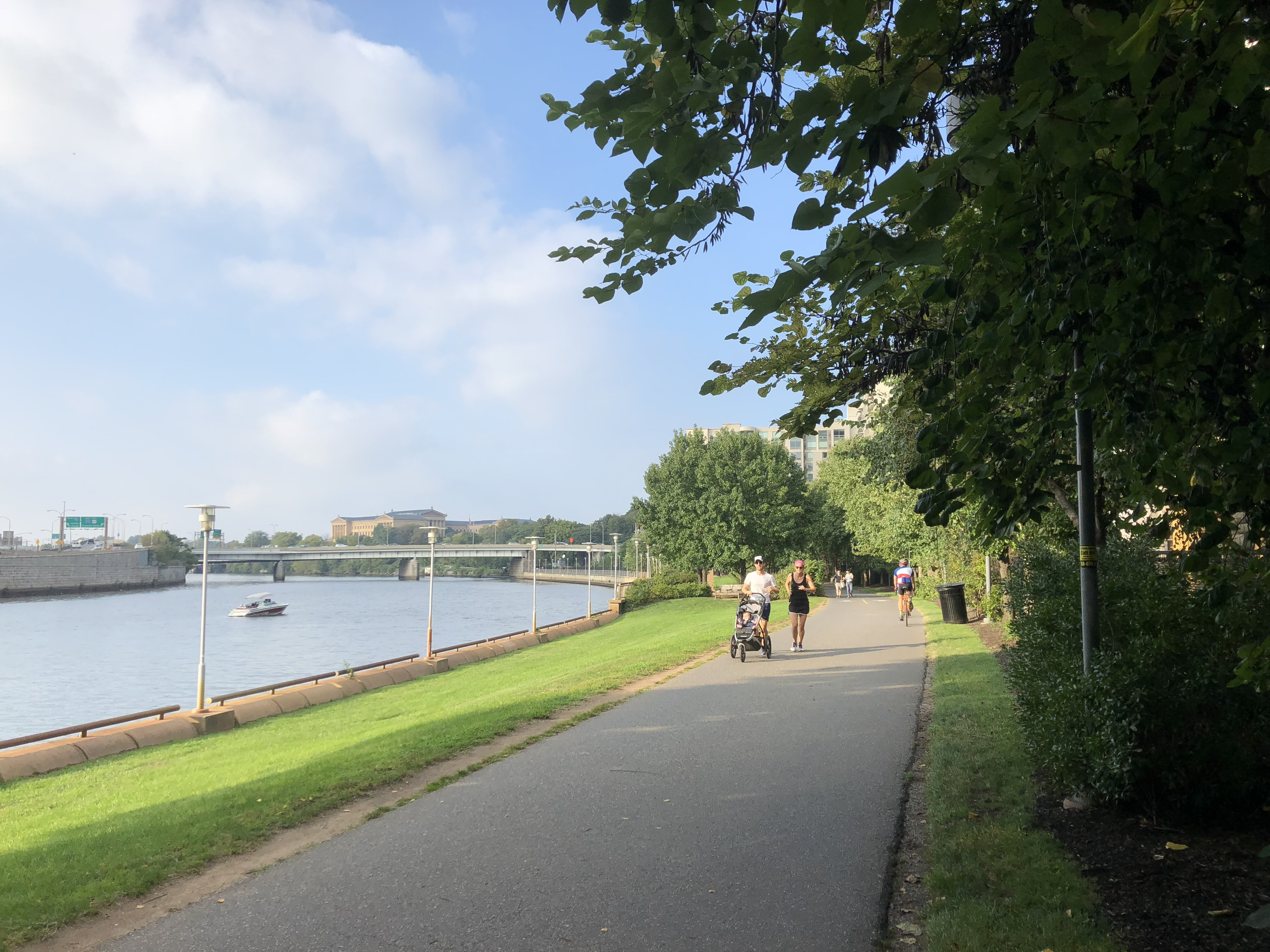
The Schuylkill River Trail

Philadelphia has several multi-use river trails. A segment of the Schuylkill River Trail passes along the Schuylkill River from Locust Street northward to Valley Forge, near the King of Prussia Mall. In Philadelphia, most of the trail runs through Fairmount Park. The trail to Valley Forge totals 10.5 miles (16.9 km), and when completed, will total 140 miles (230 km) to Hamburg, Pennsylvania.

The Wissahickon Trail branches off from the Schuylkill River Trail and runs along Wissahickon Creek, terminating near Germantown Avenue. The Pennypack Trail runs along the Pennypack Creek, from the Delaware River to Fox Chase Farm. Sections of Cobbs Creek and Tacony Creek also have trails.

=== Bicycling ===
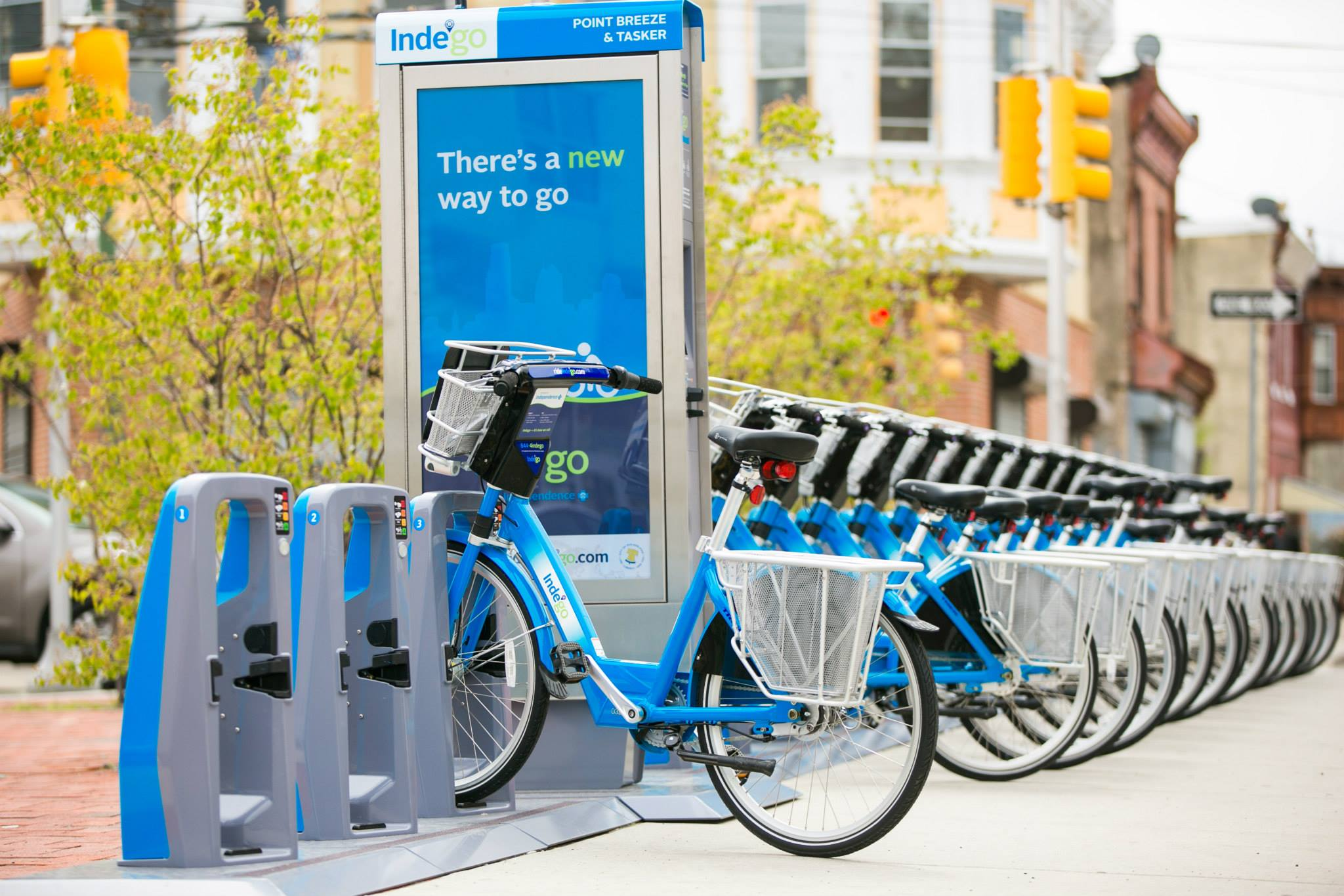
An Indego bike share

Public bicycle sharing system service Indego serves Philadelphia at 125 stations with 1,000 bikes. As of 2025, the system operates 250 stations and over 2,000 bicycles. The system is operated by Bicycle Transit Systems, a Philadelphia-based company, with bikes provided by B-cycle and stations as well as bicycles owned by the City of Philadelphia.

== Buses ==
=== SEPTA buses ===
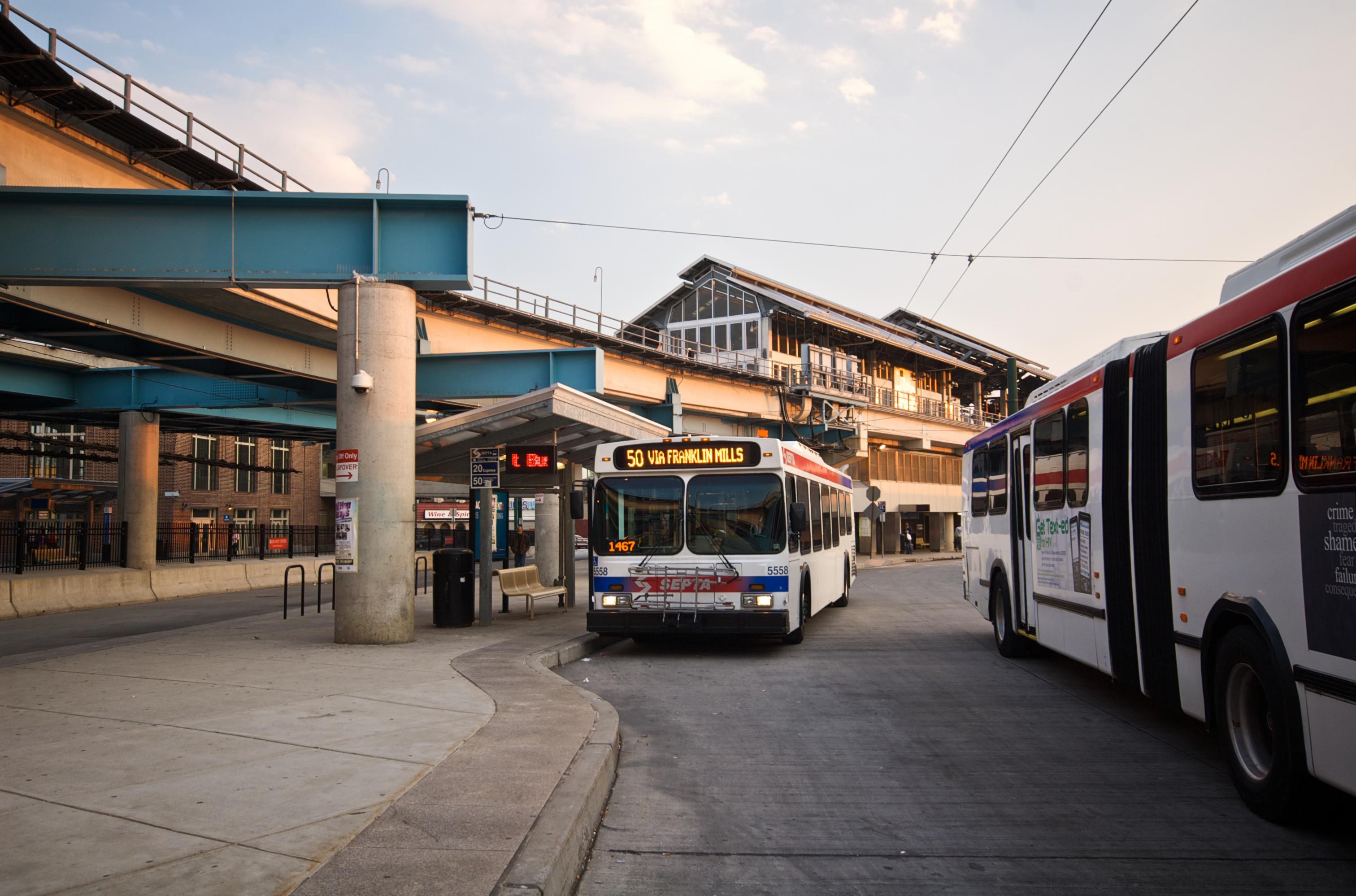
A SEPTA bus terminal

SEPTA lists 117 bus routes throughout Southeastern Pennsylvania, with most routes being within Philadelphia. Some of SEPTA's bus routes run 24 hours a day ("Night Owl" service), although most routes end by late night. SEPTA's bus service consists of its City Division routes within Philadelphia and parts of the suburbs and Suburban Division routes in the suburbs. The Suburban Division consists of the Victory ("Red Arrow") District for routes in Chester, Delaware, and Montgomery counties, and the Frontier District for buses in Chester, Montgomery, and Bucks counties. Other bus routes are its Regional Rail connector routes, the "Night Owl" bus service replacing the Market–Frankford and Broad Street subway lines during their closure, and other specialized services. SEPTA leases buses for third-party charter routes, and runs the charter buses for the School District of Philadelphia.

The City Transit Division runs 76 bus routes (including three trackless trolley routes), and the Suburban Division runs 44 bus routes. In 2009, SEPTA had a fleet of 1153 revenue buses for its City Transit Division, and 262 revenue buses for its Suburban Division.

SEPTA currently operates trackless trolleys on Routes 59, 66, and 75. Routes 59 and 75 are connected to the Market–Frankford Line at Arrott Transportation Center Station, near the terminus of the Market–Frankford Line. Route 59 travels primarily along Castor Avenue through Northeast Philadelphia, and terminates at the end of Castor Avenue, near Pennypack Park. Route 75 travels along Wyoming Avenue, and connects to Wyoming Station of the Broad Street Line, ending at Wayne Junction in Nicetown. Route 66 connects to the Market–Frankford Line at the Frankford Transportation Center, and extends along Frankford Avenue to the extremity of Northeast Philadelphia.

SEPTA formerly ran trackless trolleys along Routes 29 and 79 in South Philadelphia, but replaced those services with diesel buses in 2003. In October 2006, the SEPTA board voted not to order additional vehicles for Routes 29 and 79, making them permanent diesel bus routes.

=== NJ Transit Philadelphia-New Jersey buses ===
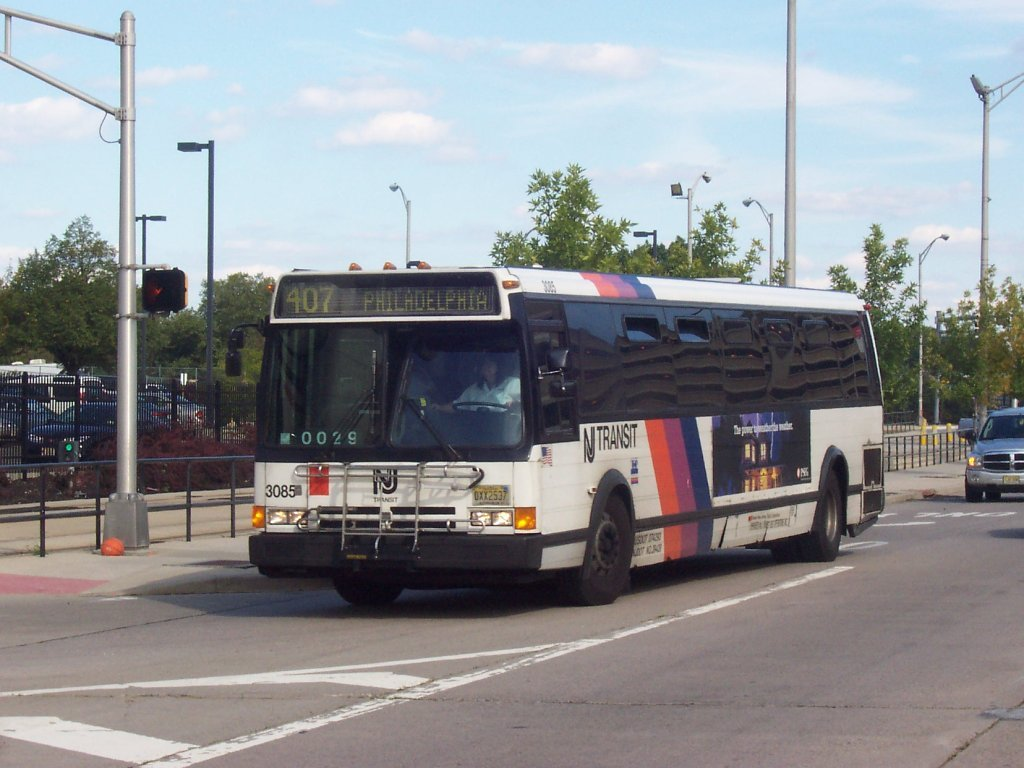
#3085 on the #407 line in Camden.

NJ Transit operates bus routes from Philadelphia via the Walter Rand Transportation Center to various New Jersey locations.

=== Philly Phlash ===
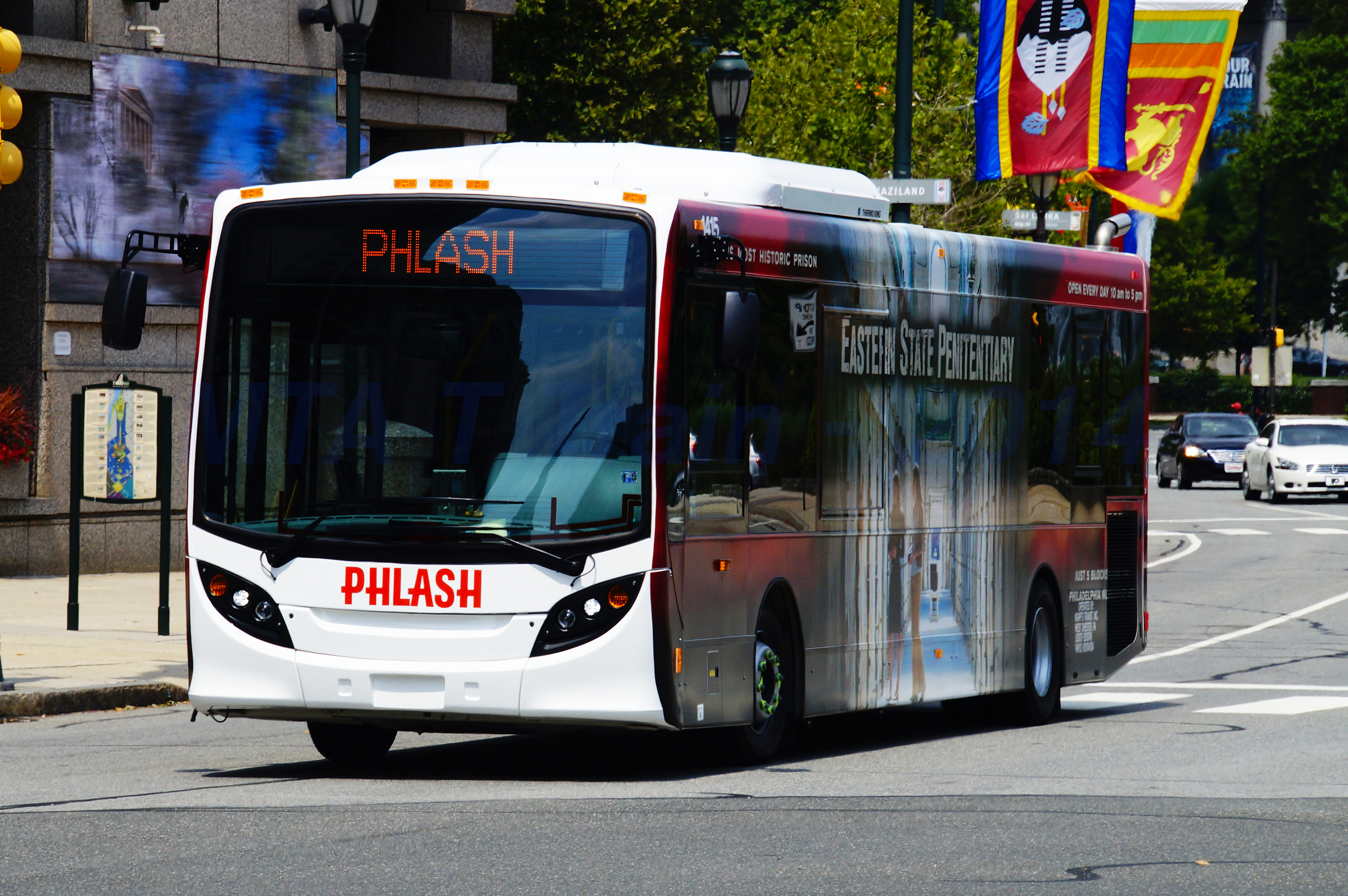
A Philly Phlash bus

The Philly PHLASH Downtown Loop is a visitor-friendly public transit service in Philadelphia, managed by the Independence Visitor Center Corporation (IVCC). PHLASH vehicles are ADA-compliant, temperature-controlled New Flyer MiDi buses. The IVCC contracted Krapf Transit to manage vehicle operations.

== Railways ==
=== SEPTA Metro ===
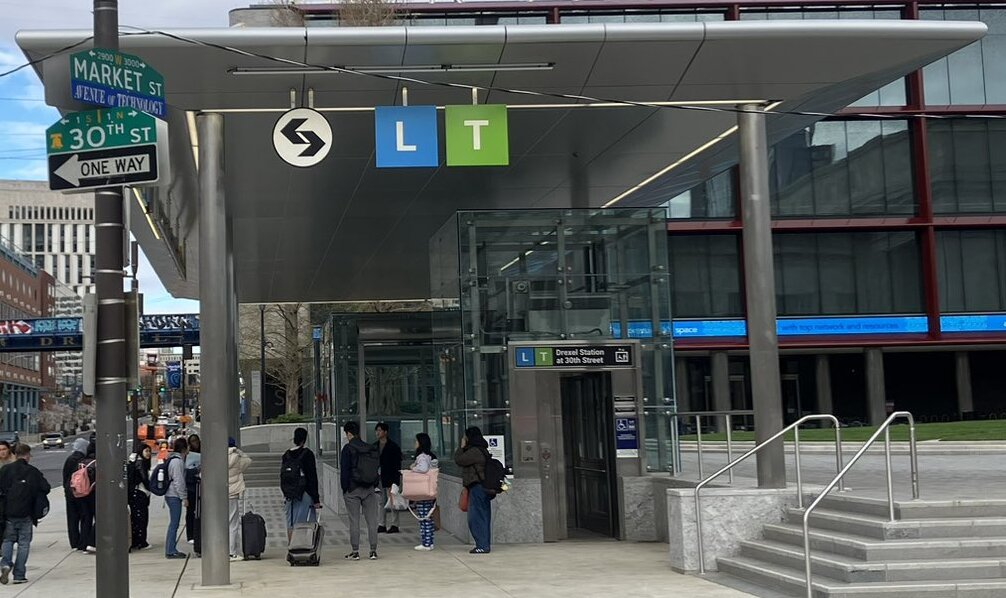
A SEPTA Metro station

SEPTA Metro is an urban rail transit network in and around Philadelphia, Pennsylvania, United States, operated by the Southeastern Pennsylvania Transportation Authority (SEPTA). The network includes two rapid transit lines, an interurban light rapid transit line, a light rail line with two services, a surface-running streetcar line, and a subway–surface trolley system with five branches, totaling 78 miles (126 km) (Note: Network mileage is calculated from one-way route mileage listed under "LRV" [41 miles (66 km)], "NHSL" [13 miles (21 km)], "MFSE" 13 miles (21 km), and "BSS" [11 miles (18 km)]) of rail service.

Philadelphia has the third-oldest subway system in the United States, dating back to 1907. Operated by the Philadelphia Rapid Transit Company until 1939 and the Philadelphia Transportation Company until 1968, the SEPTA subway system consists of two rapid transit systems converging in Center City, and five surface-level trolley lines operated in a shared subway through downtown Philadelphia.

The Market–Frankford Line and Broad Street Line combined have the sixth-highest ridership of rapid transit systems in the United States, with a daily ridership of 316,253. The rapid transit system has a total length of 25 miles (40 km) and 50 stations. Feeder trolley and bus systems connect to the terminals of the Market–Frankford Line. At 69th Street Transportation Center, the Norristown High Speed Line, and the Media–Sharon Hill Line connect to nearby suburbs, and a large bus depot handles SEPTA suburban bus routes. Near the eastern terminus of the Market–Frankford Line, three trackless trolley lines and multiple diesel bus lines converge. In addition, several regional rail lines stop at the Fern Rock Transportation Center of the Broad Street Line.

The Subway–Surface Trolley Lines are the remnants of an extensive pre-World War II streetcar system, similar to the Boston Green Line and San Francisco Muni Metro. The trolley lines were originally run by different companies, until their consolidation by the Philadelphia Rapid Transit Company in 1906. The trolleys run in a tunnel from the Drexel University and University of Pennsylvania campuses to a loop around City Hall. Unlike light-rail systems with articulated vehicles, the trolley lines use vehicles closer in size to classic PCC streetcars (although an order for 130 Alstom Citadis Class 305 five-section articulated light-rail vehicles for the city and suburban trolley lines is underway as of late 2024).

Route 15, commonly known as the Girard Avenue Trolley, was restored in 2005 after operating with buses for 13 years. The 15 line runs along Girard Avenue through Greater Kensington, North Philadelphia, and West Philadelphia. The trolley utilizes restored PCC streetcars, a type of heritage trolley built in the 1930s. The trolleys were rebuilt with added air conditioning and regenerative braking. Route 15 is the only active trolley line in Philadelphia that is not part of the Subway-Surface Trolley Line system.

SEPTA Metro lines
Line name	Type	Service patterns	Terminal stations		Avg. weekday ridership (FY 2023)
Line name	Type	Service patterns	South/West	North/East	Avg. weekday ridership (FY 2023)
Market–Frankford Line	Rapid transit	All Stops	69th Street	Frankford	107,651
Broad Street Line	Rapid transit	Local	NRG	Fern Rock	79,155
Broad Street Line	Rapid transit	Express	Walnut–Locust; NRG (limited)	Fern Rock	79,155
Broad Street Line	Rapid transit	Spur	8th–Market	Fern Rock	79,155
Subway–Surface Trolleys	Trolley	Route 10	63rd–Malvern / Overbrook	13th Street	5,396
Subway–Surface Trolleys	Trolley	Route 34	61st–Baltimore / Angora	13th Street	6,225
Subway–Surface Trolleys	Trolley	Route 13	Yeadon; Darby T.C. (limited)	13th Street	6,503
Subway–Surface Trolleys	Trolley	Route 11	Darby T.C.	13th Street	6,669
Subway–Surface Trolleys	Trolley	Route 36	80th Street–Eastwick	13th Street	7,101
Route 15 Trolley	Trolley	All Stops	63rd–Girard	Richmond–Westmoreland	4,762
Media–Sharon Hill Line	Trolley	Route 101	Orange Street / Media	69th Street	2,023
Media–Sharon Hill Line	Trolley	Route 102	Chester Pike / Sharon Hill	69th Street	2,097
Norristown High Speed Line	Light metro	Local	69th Street	Norristown	4,510

==== SEPTA Regional Rail ====
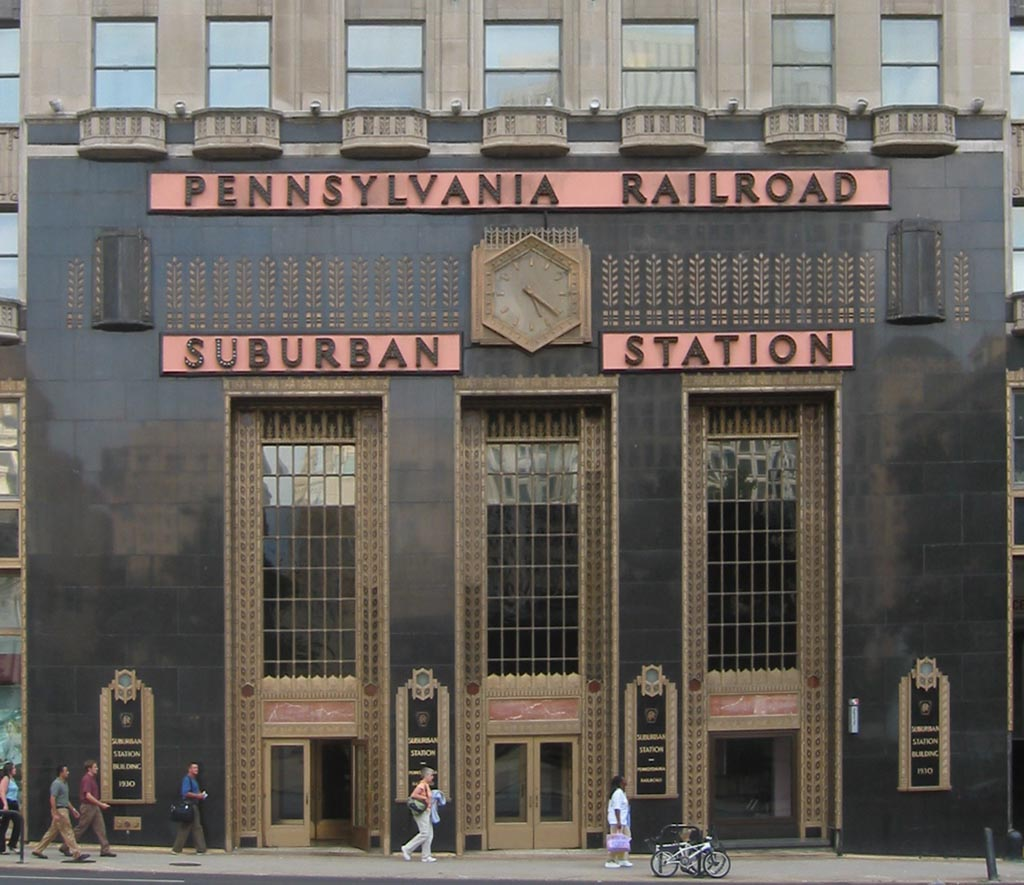
Suburban Station, one of three Center City train stations in Philadelphia serving regional rail lines

SEPTA Regional Rail division consists of 13 lines with 153 active stations, totaling 280 miles (450 km) of trackage. Each line is named by its station terminals. The core of the Regional Rail system is the Center City Commuter Connection, a four-track tunnel under Center City linking three downtown stations: 30th Street Station, Suburban Station, and Jefferson Station. The Center City Commuter Connection was opened in 1984, built to connect the stub ends of the Pennsylvania Railroad and the Reading Railroad commuter rail systems. All SEPTA trains stop at the three downtown stations, with the exception of the Cynwyd Line. Most trains stop at Temple University station, located on the eastern edge of the Temple University campus. Because the tunnel makes the through-routing of trains possible, most inbound trains from one line continue as outbound trains on another line.

Line	Total Stations	Terminal	Legacy
Airport Line	10	Philadelphia International Airport	Pennsylvania Railroad
Wilmington/Newark Line	22	Marcus Hook, Claymont, Delaware, Wilmington, Delaware, or Newark, Delaware	Pennsylvania Railroad
Media/Wawa Line	19	Media or Wawa	Pennsylvania Railroad
Paoli/Thorndale Line	26	Bryn Mawr, Paoli, Malvern, or Thorndale	Pennsylvania Railroad
Cynwyd Line	3	Bala Cynwyd	Pennsylvania Railroad
Trenton Line	15	Trenton, New Jersey	Pennsylvania Railroad
Chestnut Hill West Line	10	Chestnut Hill (Philadelphia)	Pennsylvania Railroad
Warminster Line	17	Glenside or Warminster	Reading Railroad
West Trenton Line	23	Ewing, New Jersey	Reading Railroad
Lansdale/Doylestown Line	28	Lansdale, Colmar, or Doylestown	Reading Railroad
Manayunk/Norristown Line	16	Norristown	Reading Railroad
Chestnut Hill East Line	14	Chestnut Hill (Philadelphia)	Reading Railroad
Fox Chase Line	10	Fox Chase (Philadelphia)	Reading Railroad

=== PATCO Speedline ===
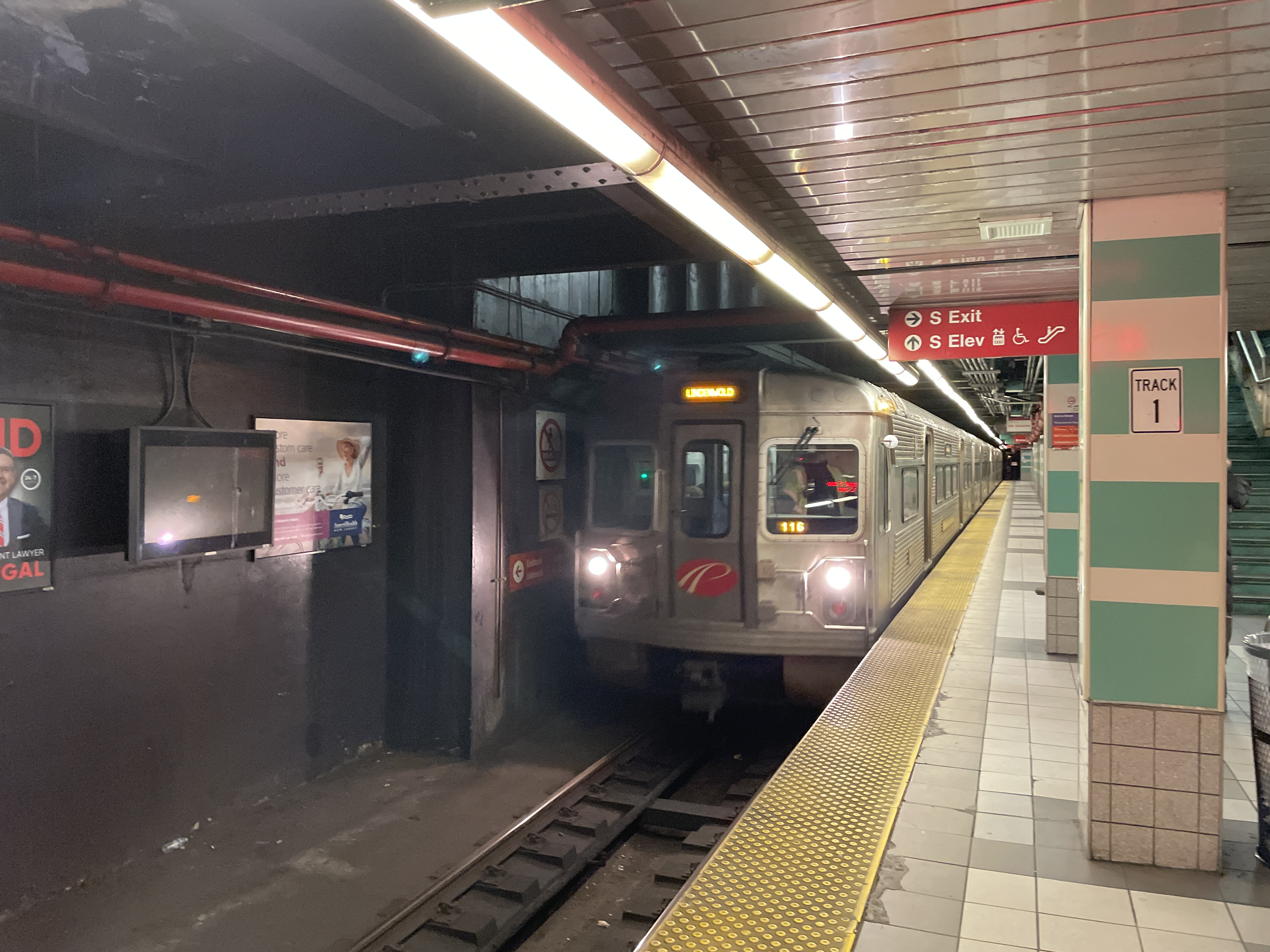
A PATCO Speedline train eastbound at 8th Street station

The PATCO Speedline is a grade-separated system linking Philadelphia to the cities of Camden, Haddonfield, and Lindenwold in New Jersey. The Speedline has a daily ridership of 38,000, and is the primary transit link between South Jersey and Philadelphia. It is operated by the Port Authority Transit Corporation, a subsidiary of the Delaware River Port Authority (DRPA), and is the only rail line in Philadelphia to operate 24 hours a day during the week. According to a study conducted by the Delaware Valley Regional Planning Commission, 95% of riders are New Jersey residents, and the Speedline carries 47% of New Jersey business commuters with jobs in Center City.

=== NJ Transit Atlantic City Line ===
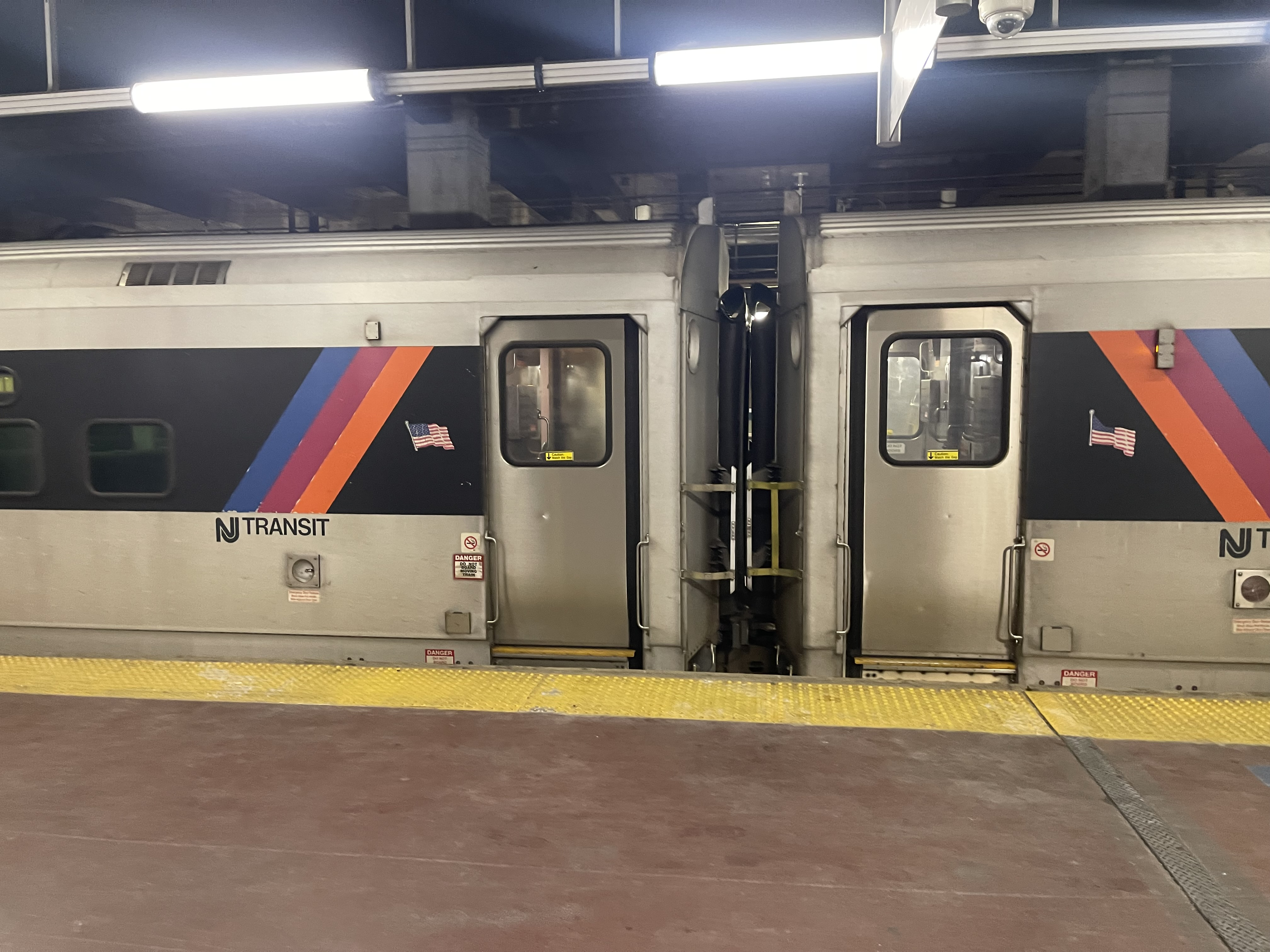
A New Jersey Transit train at 30th Street Station

NJ Transit operates the Atlantic City Line from 30th Street Station to Atlantic City, New Jersey. Historically run by the Pennsylvania-Reading Seashore Lines, the current line opened in 1989 by Amtrak as the "Gambler's Express" and has been operated solely by NJ Transit since 1996. The line has six intermediate stops in New Jersey, with 13–16 departures in each direction per day.

=== NJ Transit River Line ===
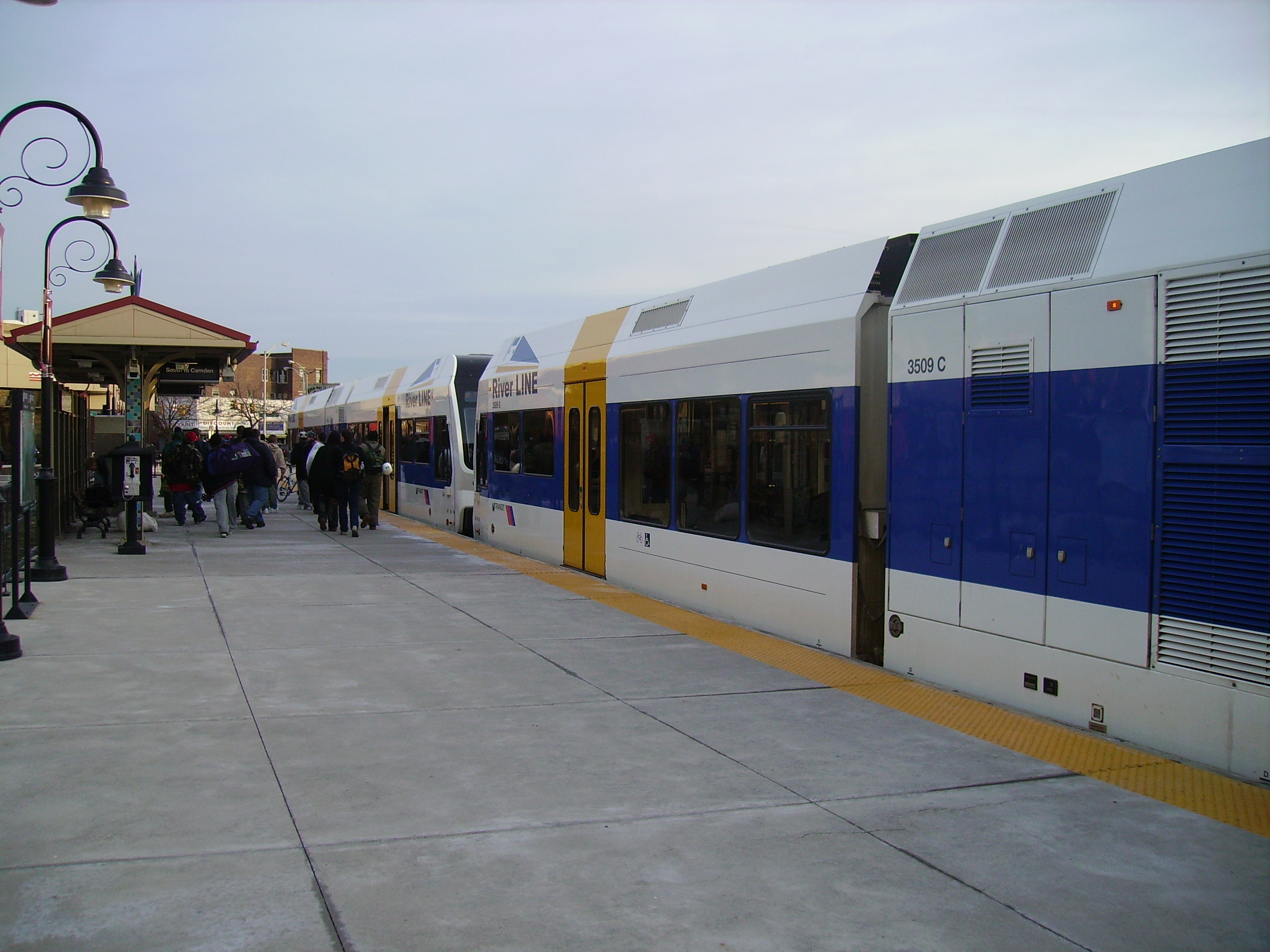
River Line shown at the Walter Rand Transportation Center

The River Line is a hybrid rail (light rail with some features similar to commuter rail) line in Greater Philadelphia that connects the cities of Camden and Trenton, New Jersey's capital. It is so named because its route between the two cities is parallel to the Delaware River.

=== Amtrak Intercity Rail ===
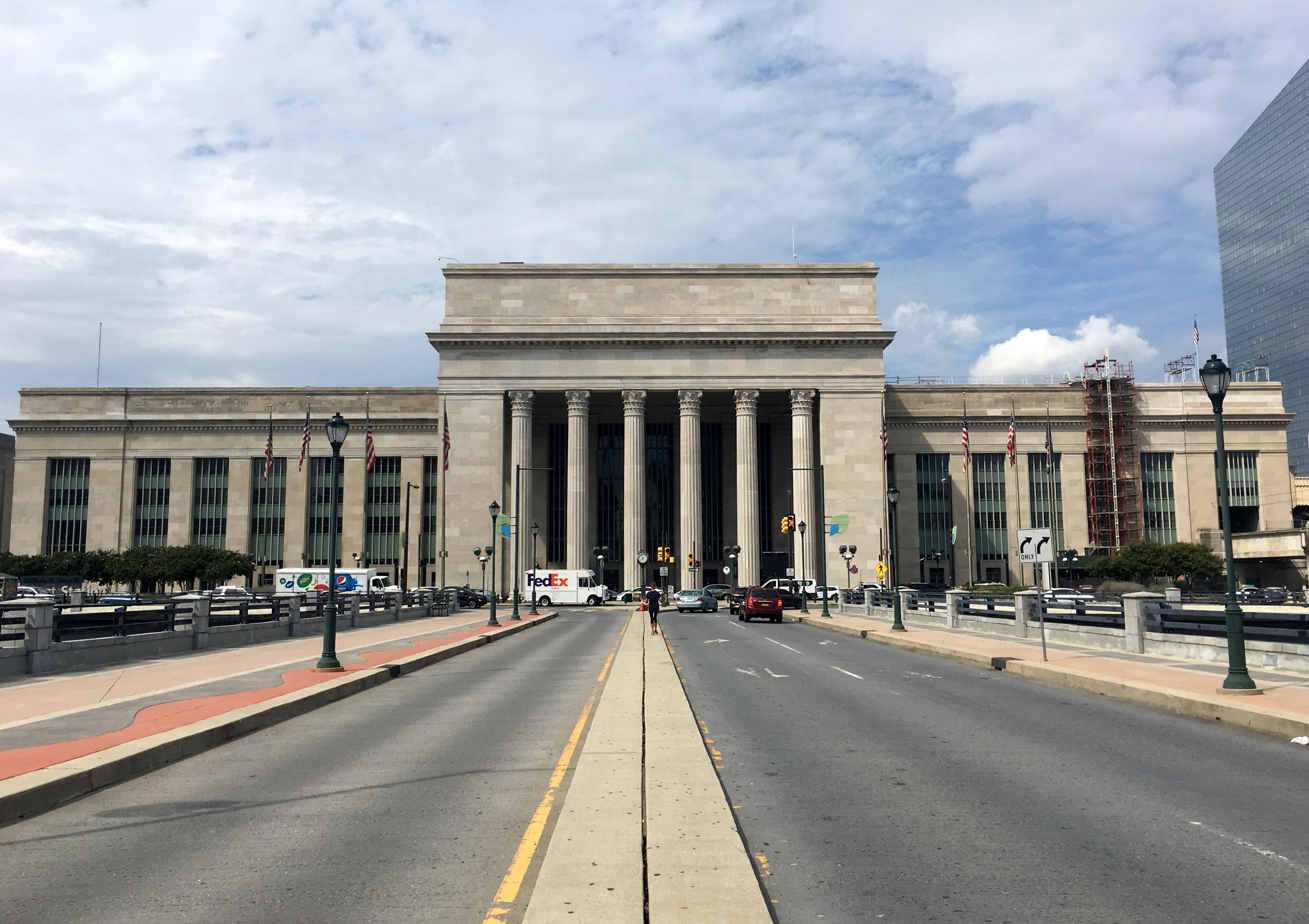
30th Street Station, the main intercity railroad station of Philadelphia and third-busiest Amtrak station in the nation

Intercity train service is operated out of 30th Street Station by Amtrak. Amtrak runs most services along the electrified Northeast Corridor, serving a densely urbanized string of cities in the Northeastern United States. Amtrak runs at least 53 trains each weekday on its busiest route, Philadelphia to New York City. Regular train service along the Northeast Corridor consists of the Acela Express, a high-speed train between Boston and Washington, D.C., and the Northeast Regional, a local service with northern terminals of either Boston or Springfield, Massachusetts (using a diesel locomotive), and southern terminals of Washington, D.C., Newport News, or Lynchburg, Virginia. Amtrak runs several long-distance rail routes along the Northeast Corridor, including night trains. Long-distance trains run primarily on tracks owned and maintained by private freight railroads, and serve 39 states including the District of Columbia.

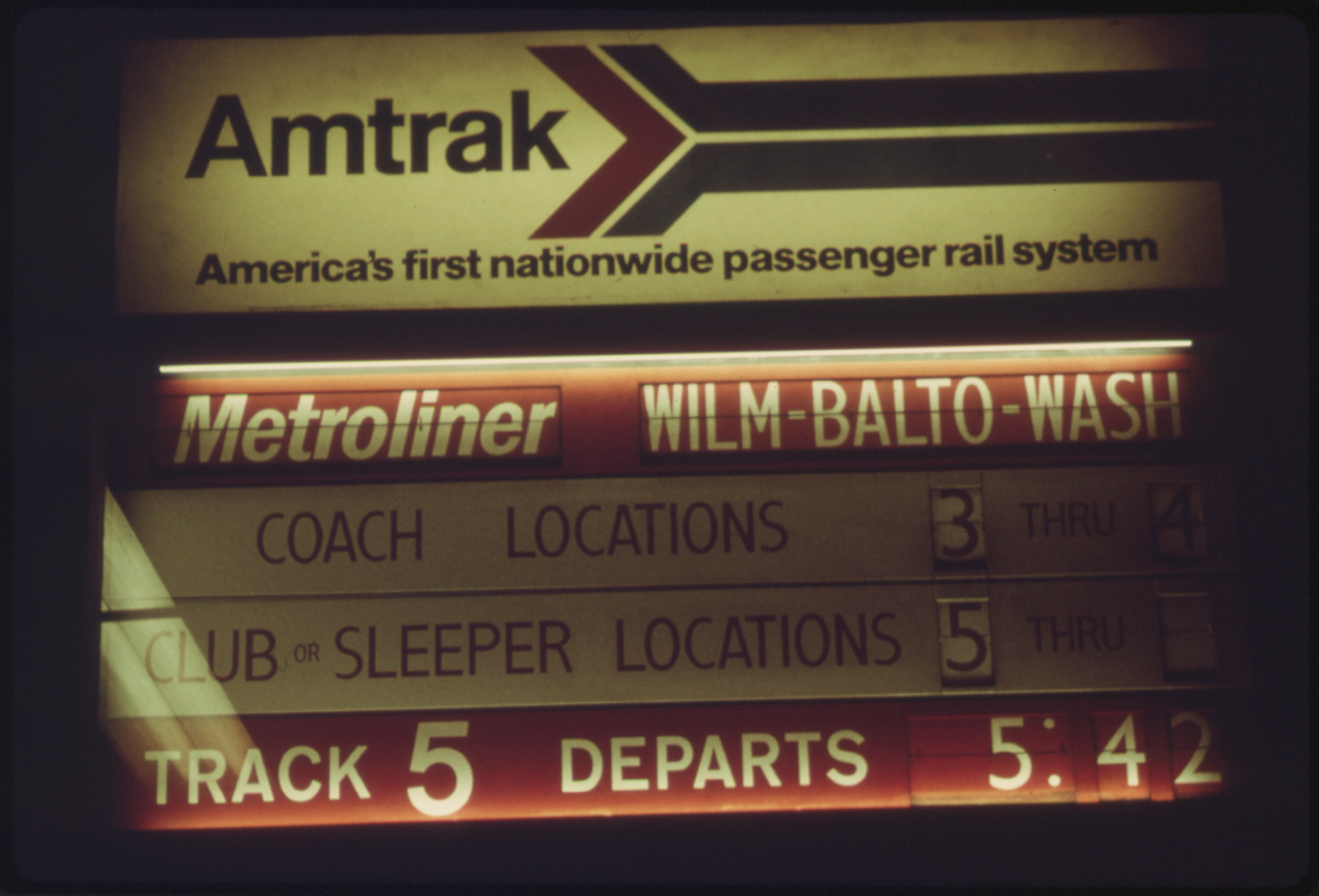
Amtrak Metroliner information sign at the 30th Street Station, April 1974.

Amtrak operates two routes along the Keystone Corridor, connecting Philadelphia to Harrisburg and Pittsburgh. The Keystone Corridor consists of two different segments: the section between Harrisburg and Philadelphia, and the segment west of Harrisburg to Pittsburgh. The eastern segment of the line, owned by Amtrak, is fully electrified and almost completely grade separated. The Philadelphia to Harrisburg section was upgraded to allow for top speeds of 110 miles per hour (180 km/h). The section west of Harrisburg is a heavy-duty freight railroad owned by Norfork Southern. Regular service on the Keystone Corridor consists of the Keystone Service, which travels between Harrisburg and Philadelphia. After stopping in Philadelphia, certain trains continue along the Northeast Corridor to New York. The western section traverses mountainous terrain, and has obstacles that limit track speeds, such as the Horseshoe Curve. The Pennsylvanian, consisting of one train in each direction per day, is the only route between Philadelphia and Pittsburgh.

==== Frequent service routes ====
Train	Terminals		Frequency	Stations	Route length
Acela Express	Boston	Washington	16 trains per weekday	16	456 miles (734 km)
Keystone Service	New York	Harrisburg	8–10 trains per weekday	21	195 miles (314 km)
Keystone Service	Philadelphia	Harrisburg	3–5 trains per weekday	12	104 miles (167 km)
Northeast Regional	Boston	Washington	17–21 trains per day	30	456 miles (734 km)
Northeast Regional	Springfield	Washington	1–2 trains per day	28	364 miles (586 km)

==== Daily and nightly routes ====
Train	Terminals		Frequency	Stations	Route length
Cardinal	New York	Chicago	3 trains per week	32	1,147 miles (1,846 km)
Carolinian	New York	Charlotte	Daily	24	704 miles (1,133 km)
Crescent	New York	New Orleans	Daily	33	1,377 miles (2,216 km)
Palmetto	New York	Savannah	Daily	20	829 miles (1,334 km)
Pennsylvanian	New York	Pittsburgh	Daily	19	444 miles (715 km)
Silver Meteor	New York	Miami	Daily	32	1,389 miles (2,235 km)
Silver Star	New York	Miami	Daily	36	1,522 miles (2,449 km)
Vermonter	St. Albans	Washington	Daily	30	611 miles (983 km)

=== Major transit hubs ===
There are several major transit terminals in the Philadelphia metropolitan area.

Major rail stations include:

- 30th Street Station, which is served by Amtrak, SEPTA, New Jersey Transit, and the SEPTA Metro.
- Suburban Station, which connects SEPTA Regional Rail with SEPTA Metro at 15th Street/City Hall station
- Jefferson Station, which connects SEPTA regional rail with SEPTA Metro and the PATCO Speedline via the 8th Street station
- 69th Street Transportation Center, which is served by SEPTA Metro and buses connecting Philadelphia to the northwest suburbs.
- Walter Rand Transportation Center, which is served by PATCO, NJ Transit River Line and NJ Transit buses connecting Philadelphia to Camden and Trenton and the New Jersey suburbs.

== Water transportation ==
=== Philadelphia Naval Shipyard ===
The former Philadelphia Naval Shipyard is located at the confluence of the Delaware and Schuylkill rivers. The facility was used as a shipyard for the U.S. Navy until the cessation of military activities on September 27, 1996. The Naval Yard saw extensive use during World War II, when the yard employed a peak of 58,434 civilians and built 53 ships, including the USS New Jersey and USS Wisconsin.

=== Aker Philadelphia Shipyard ===
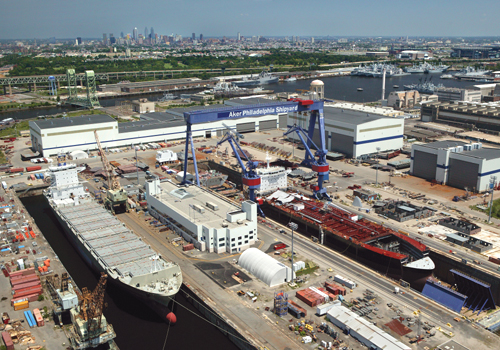
Shipbuilding facility of Aker Philadelphia Shipyard

After the conversion of the Naval Yard for civilian uses, the Norwegian company Kværner rebuilt the western facility for commercial shipbuilding operations in partnership with the City of Philadelphia. Now called the Aker Philadelphia Shipyard, the yard opened in 2000 and delivered its first vessel in 2003. The Aker Shipyard has built twelve ships, and has four vessels under construction.

=== Port of Philadelphia ===
Since 1990, the Port of Philadelphia has been operated by the Philadelphia Regional Port Authority, a state agency created to fund the port infrastructure. The busiest facility of the Port of Philadelphia is the Packer Avenue Marine Terminal, located north of the Walt Whitman Bridge. The facility is serviced by three class-one railroads – CP Rail, CSX, and Norfolk Southern – and is located in close proximity to I-95 and I-76.

The Tioga Marine Terminal, located south of the Betsy Ross Bridge, has specialized equipment for handling Chilean fruit and Argentine juice. The Port of Philadelphia is one of the Strategic Military Ports of the U.S. Department of Defense, making it one of only 14 ports in the United States permitted to handle the nation's military cargo.

=== Cruise Ship Terminal ===
The Delaware River Port Authority operates a cruise ship terminal at Pier One of the Philadelphia Naval Business Center. No cruise lines were based at the terminal as of 2010, although two cruise lines have scheduled stops in Philadelphia.

The terminal handled a peak of 35 sailings in 2006, when the Norwegian Majesty was based at the terminal before it was sold.

=== RiverLink Ferry ===
The RiverLink Ferry is a passenger ferry that connects Penn's Landing with the Camden, NJ, waterfront across the Delaware River. The ferry provides a way for tourists to reach waterfront attractions on both sides of the river, and is managed by Hornblower Marine Services for the Delaware River Port Authority.

== Vehicles for hire ==
Uber entered the Philadelphia market in June 2012 as a chauffeured limousine service. UberX, which connects riders to drivers, began operating in Philadelphia in October 2014.

== Public transportation statistics ==
The average amount of time a commuter in Philadelphia spends riding public transit on a weekday is 93 minutes; 35% of public transit commuters ride for more than 2 hours every day. The average wait time at a stop or station for public transit is 16 minutes, while 27% of riders wait for over 20 minutes on average every day. The average single-trip distance with public transit is 6.4 miles (10.3 km), while 27% travel over 7.5 miles (12 km) in a single direction.

== Aviation ==
=== Philadelphia International Airport ===
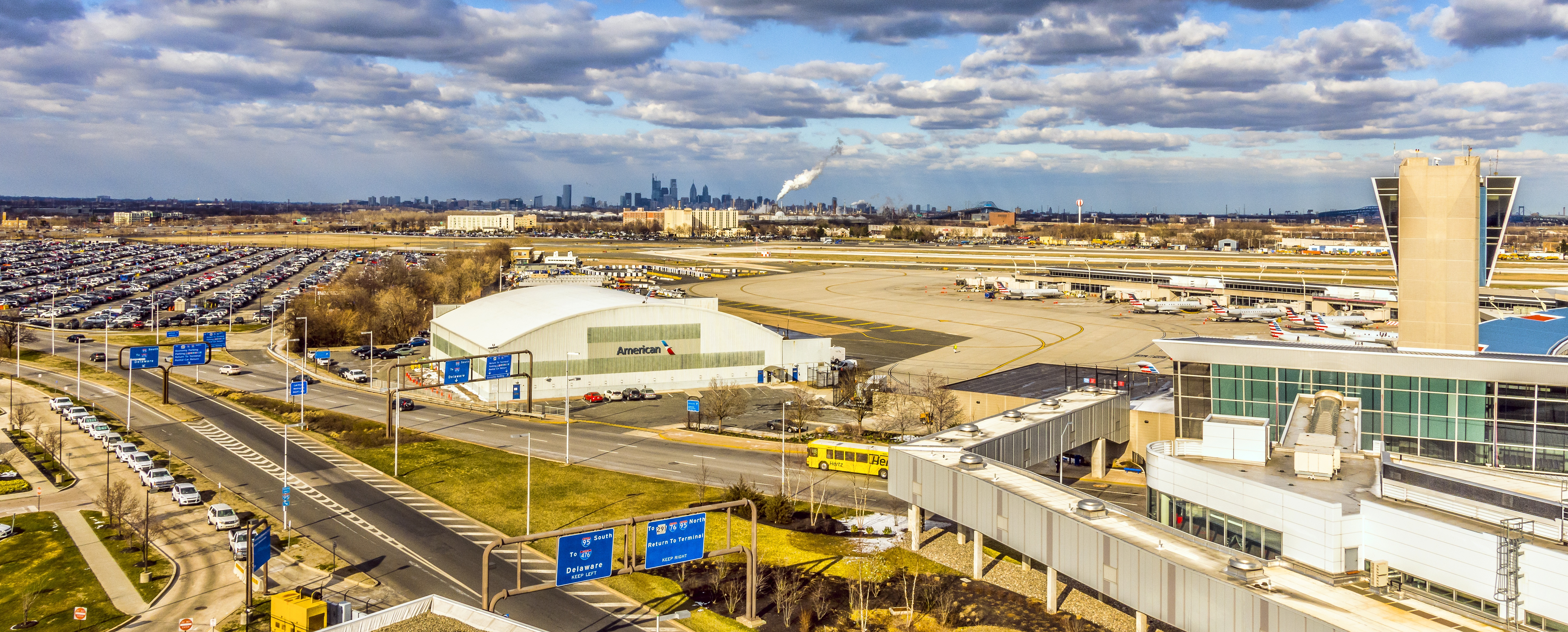
View of the Philadelphia skyline with American Airlines aircraft docked at Terminal F of Philadelphia International Airport in March 2018

Philadelphia International Airport (PHL) is the largest airport in the Philadelphia region and the 11th-busiest airport in the world in 2008 in terms of traffic movements. Most of PHL is located in Philadelphia proper, while the international terminal and the western end of the airfield are located in Tinicum Township.

Philadelphia International Airport is a domestic hub and the primary international hub of American Airlines. American Airlines uses Terminal A West, the international terminal, for flights to Europe and the Caribbean. Terminals B and C are used exclusively for domestic American Airlines flights, and American Eagle regional flights use Terminal F. Southwest Airlines, a major domestic low-cost airline, began flights to PHL in 2004 despite its business model of utilizing secondary airports. Southwest operates its flights from Terminal E along with several other airlines. UPS Airlines operates a regional freight hub at the airport.

PHL is connected to Center City by the SEPTA Airport Line, which has four stations throughout the airport and travels to 30th Street Station, Suburban Station, and Jefferson Station in downtown Philadelphia. There is also taxi service to the airport.

=== Northeast Philadelphia Airport ===
Northeast Philadelphia Airport, located in the Ashton-Woodenbridge neighborhood of Northeast Philadelphia, is used for general aviation flights. It is the sixth-busiest airport in Pennsylvania, and has two runways. In 2006, the airport had an average of 289 aircraft operations per day, and 203 aircraft based at the airport.

== See also ==
- History of rail transport in Philadelphia
- Philadelphia Main Line
- Plug-in electric vehicles in Pennsylvania § Philadelphia
