= Red Bike =

Bike sharing system in Cincinnati Ohio and Northern Kentucky, United States

Cincy Red Bike

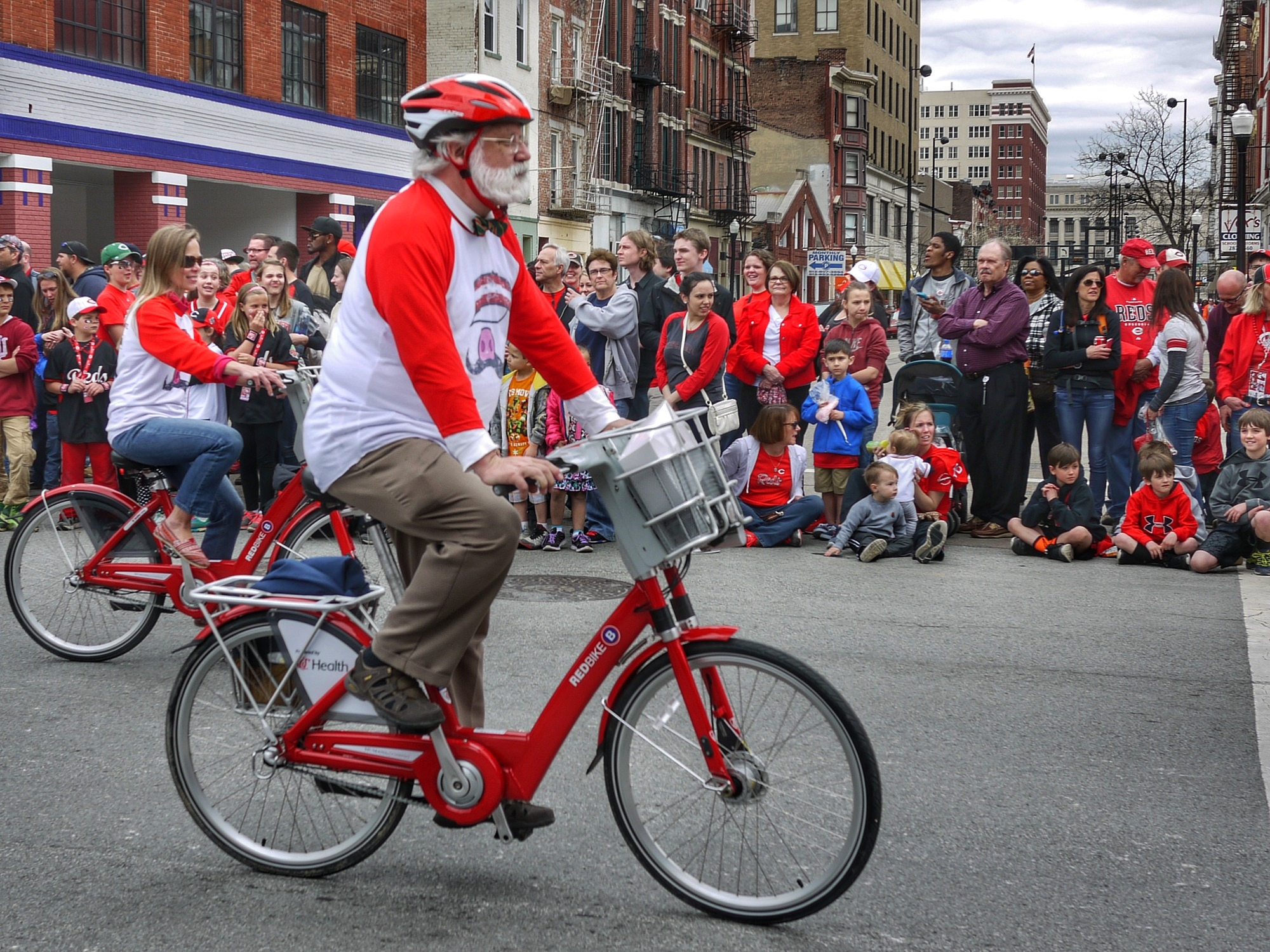

Overview
- Locale: Cincinnati
- Transit type: Bicycle-sharing system
- Number of stations: 70
- Daily ridership: 100,000/yr (approximate)
- Website: cincyredbike.org

Operation
- Began operation: September 15, 2014; 12 years ago
- Operator: BCycle
- Number of vehicles: 700

Red Bike is a public bicycle-sharing system operated by BCycle that serves Cincinnati and Northern Kentucky. The system opened to the public in September 2014 with 35 stations and 260 bikes, and operates with 500 bikes out of 76 stations as of October 2025.

== History ==
With a recommendation from the Cincinnati Bike Share Feasibility Study completed in September 2012, Cincinnati installed Phase 1 of the Red Bike system in the Downtown, OTR and Uptown neighborhoods which opened to the public in September 2014. An expansion of the system was completed in the summer of 2015 which increased the size from 35 stations to 50 stations. The expansion added 11 new stations to Northern Kentucky, making it the first bike share system in Kentucky, and added 4 stations in other areas of Cincinnati. During July 2016 six new stations were added to the system.

The initial cost of setting up Cincy Red Bike was approximately US$2 million. The city of Cincinnati provided $1.1 million with the rest of the capital coming from private funding.

The system had its 100,000th ride early October 2015 (a year and a few weeks after the system opened).

As of July 2022, Red Bike had grown to 59 bike share stations and more than 500 publicly shared bicycles.

On January 12, 2024, Red Bike announced that there would be a pause in service with hopes of re-opening in Spring of 2024. The pause was induced due to a lack of operational funding, but with the help of government and community organizations, service was resumed on May 13, 2024.

As of October 2025, Red Bike operates 76 stations with 500 bicycles.

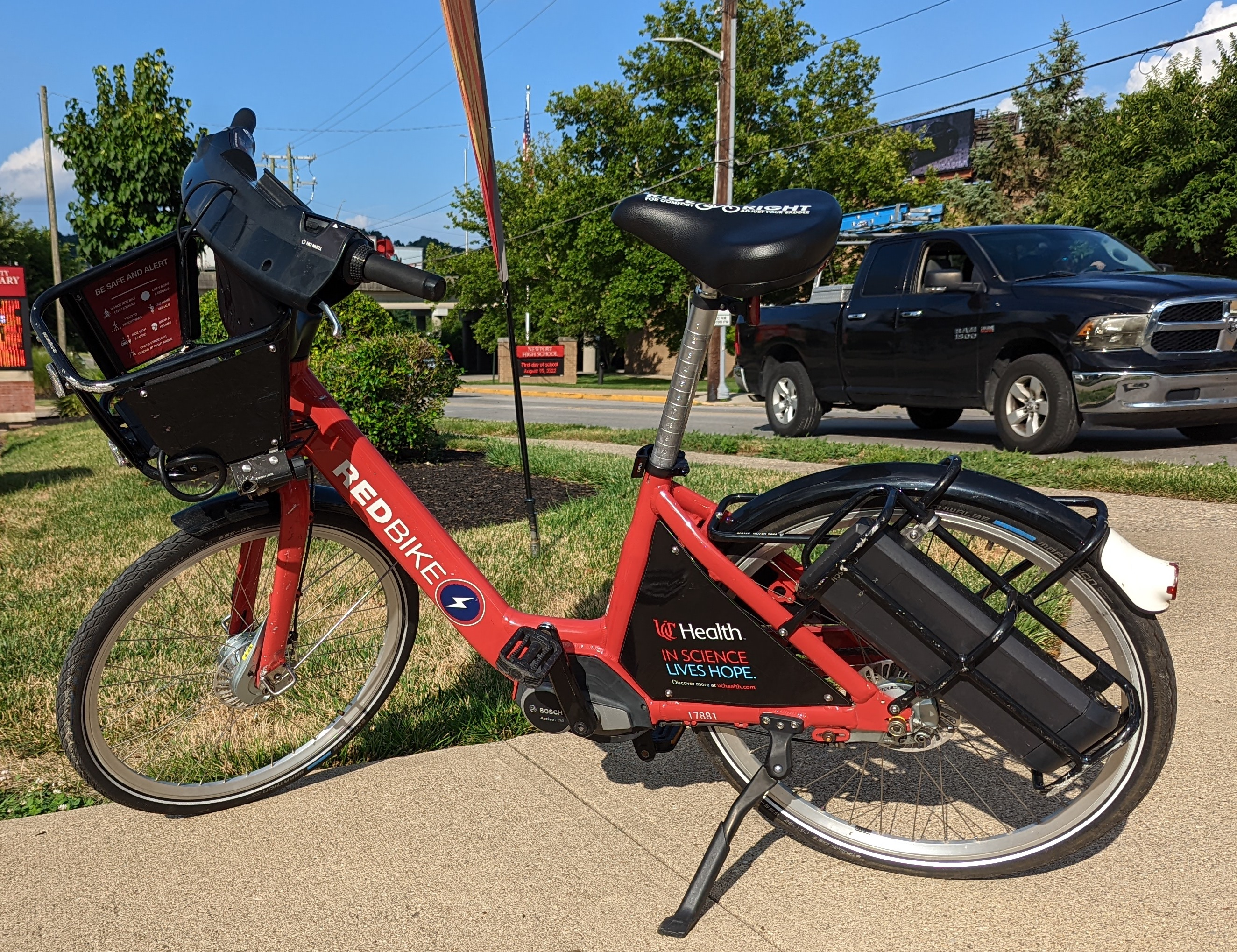
An electric bicycle of the Red Bike system in Newport, 2022.

== Bicycles ==
The bicycles are utility bicycles with a unisex step-through frame. Their one-piece aluminum frame and handlebars conceal cables and fasteners in an effort to protect them from vandalism and inclement weather.

== Payment ==
24-hour daily ($12) passes are sold through Red Bike docking stations.

The annual membership rate is $150. Monthly memberships are $30 a month.

Residents of Cincinnati and Northern Kentucky who receive food or energy assistance, or are clients of one of Red Bike's partner organizations, qualify for a $5 monthly pass called Red Bike Go.

Trips using these passes are limited to 2 hours for daily and annual passes, before extra fees kick in.

All payments are by credit card, with the exception of Red Bike Go monthly passes which may be purchased with cash in person at outreach events or by appointment at the Red Bike Shop.

== See also ==
- List of bicycle-sharing systems
