= BCycle =

Bicycle sharing company in the United States

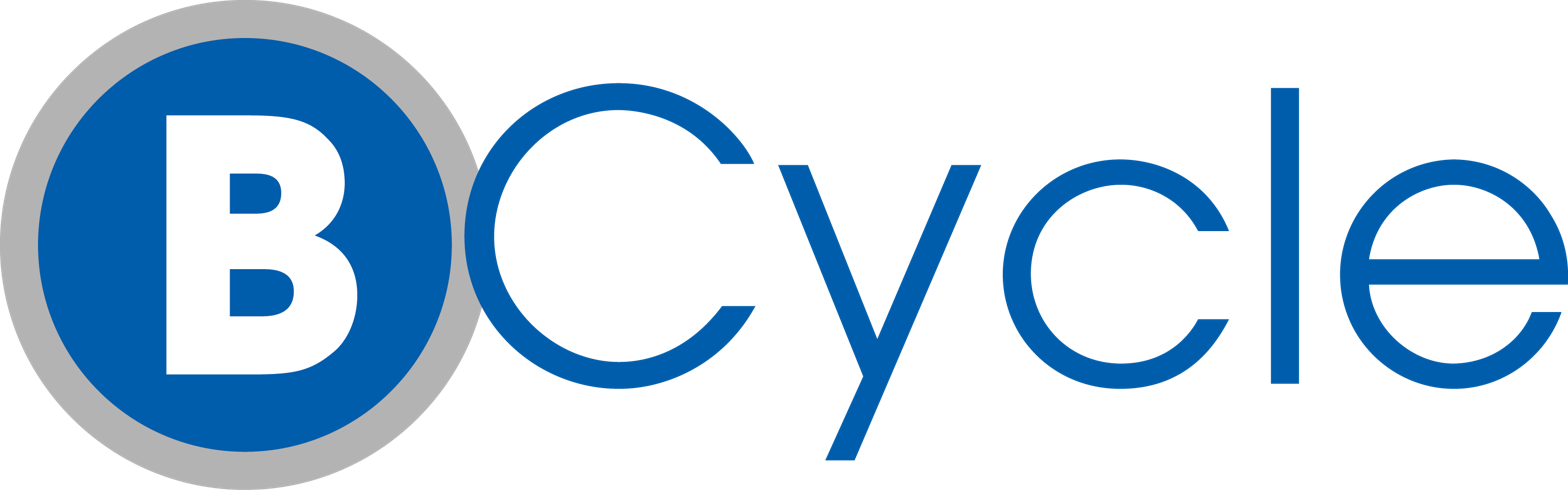
- Formerly: Freewheelin
- Type: Private
- Founded: 2008; 18 years ago
- Headquarters: Philadelphia, Pennsylvania, United States
- Number of locations: 34 systems
- Area served: United States
- Key people: Kristin Gavin (CEO, Bicycle Transit Systems)
- Services: Bicycle-sharing system
- Website: bcycle.com

BCycle is a public bicycle sharing company owned by Bicycle Transit Systems and is based in Philadelphia, Pennsylvania, United States. It has 34 local systems operating in cities across the United States. However, in several cities it operates under a name other than BCycle (i.e., Indego Bike Share, Red Bike, GREENbike, etc.)

== Description ==
The BCycle system consists of bicycles and solar-powered stations positioned throughout a city or region. The result is a slight variation in the system, depending on the city of operation. Such variations can include differences in pricing and operating under a name other than BCycle. Notwithstanding, even though they may operate under different names, their stations will still include the logo with a circled "B" (but perhaps with a different color outer circle). Variations are also affected by the primary sponsors of the local system.

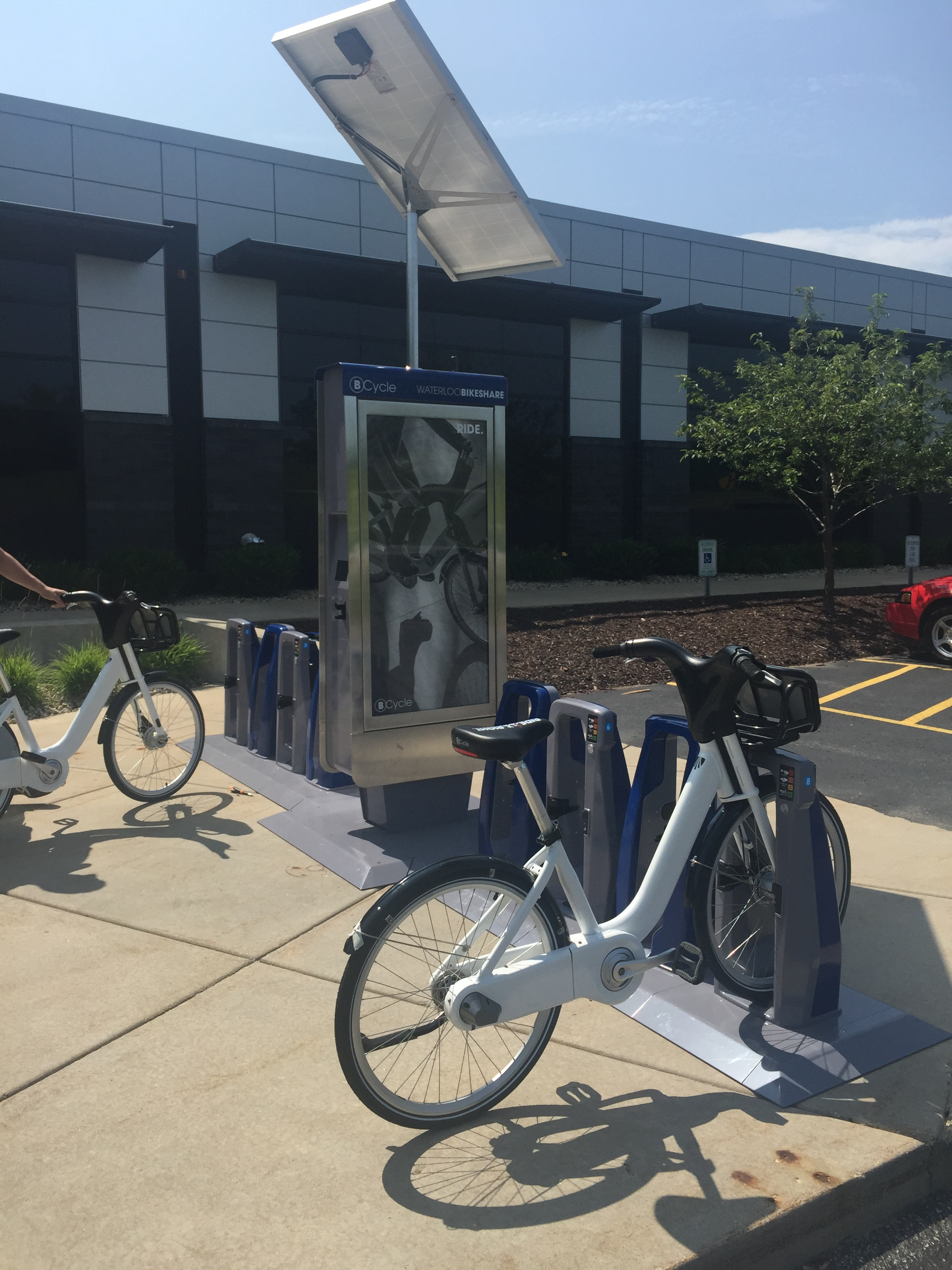
BCycle's 2.0 bike share system in front of the Trek Bicycle headquarters in Waterloo, Wisconsin.

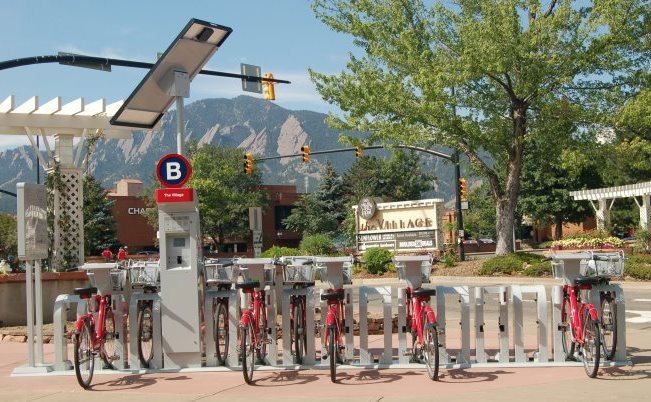
Solar powered Boulder B-cycle station with double sided docks.

Users of the system can purchase annual memberships or just a day or week pass. The system is intended for short trips rather than using an automobile or bike rentals. They can then check out and return bikes at any station in their city. Depending on the local system and type of membership or pass, users can keep the bicycles for 30–60 minutes without any additional charge for an unlimited number of times. Bicycles can be used longer for a nominal hourly assessment. However, if a bicycle is returned to any station, it can usually be immediately checked back out for an additional 30-60 free minutes. Another variation is dates and hours of operations. Some systems do not operate at night and some do not operate during the winter months. Notwithstanding the variations, annual memberships are recognized in most BCycle cities in a reciprocity program called "B-connected".

The bicycles used by BCycle were designed specifically for bike sharing by Trek Bicycle.

== History ==
In 2007, the founding partners of BCycle, Trek and health care insurance company Humana, launched their bike sharing venture with the nation's largest ever temporary bike sharing program at the 2008 Democratic National Convention in Denver, Colorado. Called Freewheelin, developed within Humana's Innovation Center. This program made 1,000 bikes available to the delegates at both the Democratic and Republican National Conventions. The programs proved so successful that the Democratic host committee selected bike sharing as a special legacy program to receive a donation to launch the country's first smart bike sharing system.

Following the Democratic National Convention, Trek, Humana and advertising agency Crispin Porter + Bogusky formed B-Cycle, LLC to be led by Humana Innovation Executives, Nate Kvamme, Jacalyn Scribner and Andrew Papa. The chosen leadership team was instrumental in building Freewheelin from ideation through commercialization within Humana's Innovation Center. The initiative for B-Cycle was to develop a technologically and visually appealing bike share system. The joint venture worked with a non-profit created to operate the system, Denver Bike Sharing, operating as Denver B-cycle, to launch with 500 bikes and 40 stations in Denver on Earth Day, April 22, 2010. In 2018, the eighth year of Denver B-cycle, it received a US$400,000 subsidy from the City of Denver government.

In October 2024, BCycle was acquired by Bicycle Transit Systems, making it the only vertically integrated docked bike share company in North America.

== Controversy and competition ==
=== Denver, Colorado ===
In 2018, controversy emerged on the Denver City Council, with criticism that "B-cycle is mainly in areas where it's white and wealthy and not in neighborhoods of color and working-class neighborhoods where transit is a need." Substantial competition to dockable bicycle transportation has emerged from unsubsidized "[d]ockless bike and scooter companies have flocked to Denver," including Jump bicycles and Lime scooters.

In mid-November 2019, the city announced the end of the B-cycle operation, with 700 bikes and all stations to be removed by the end of January 2020.

== Locations ==
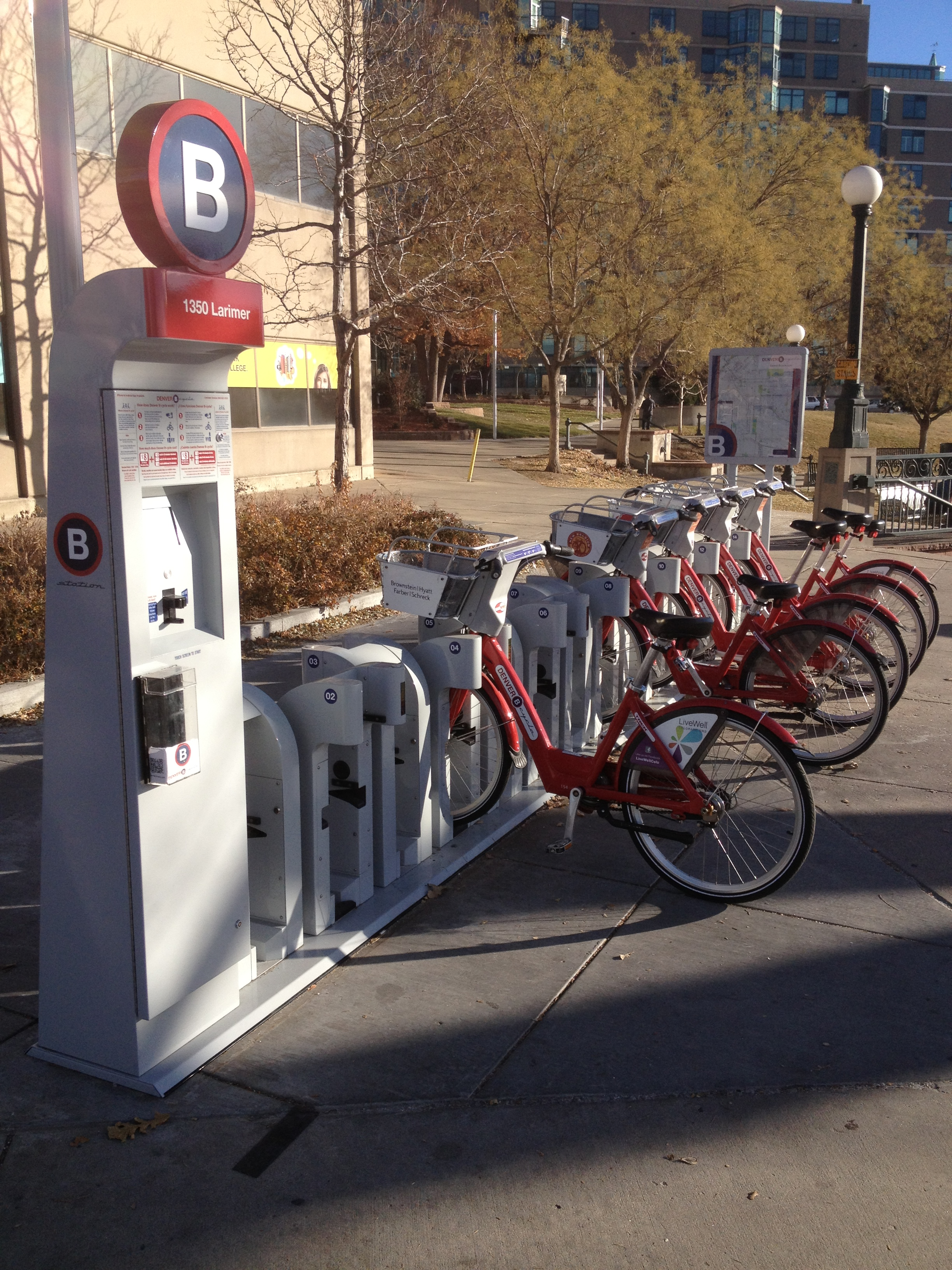
A 15 dock, solar powered station in Denver

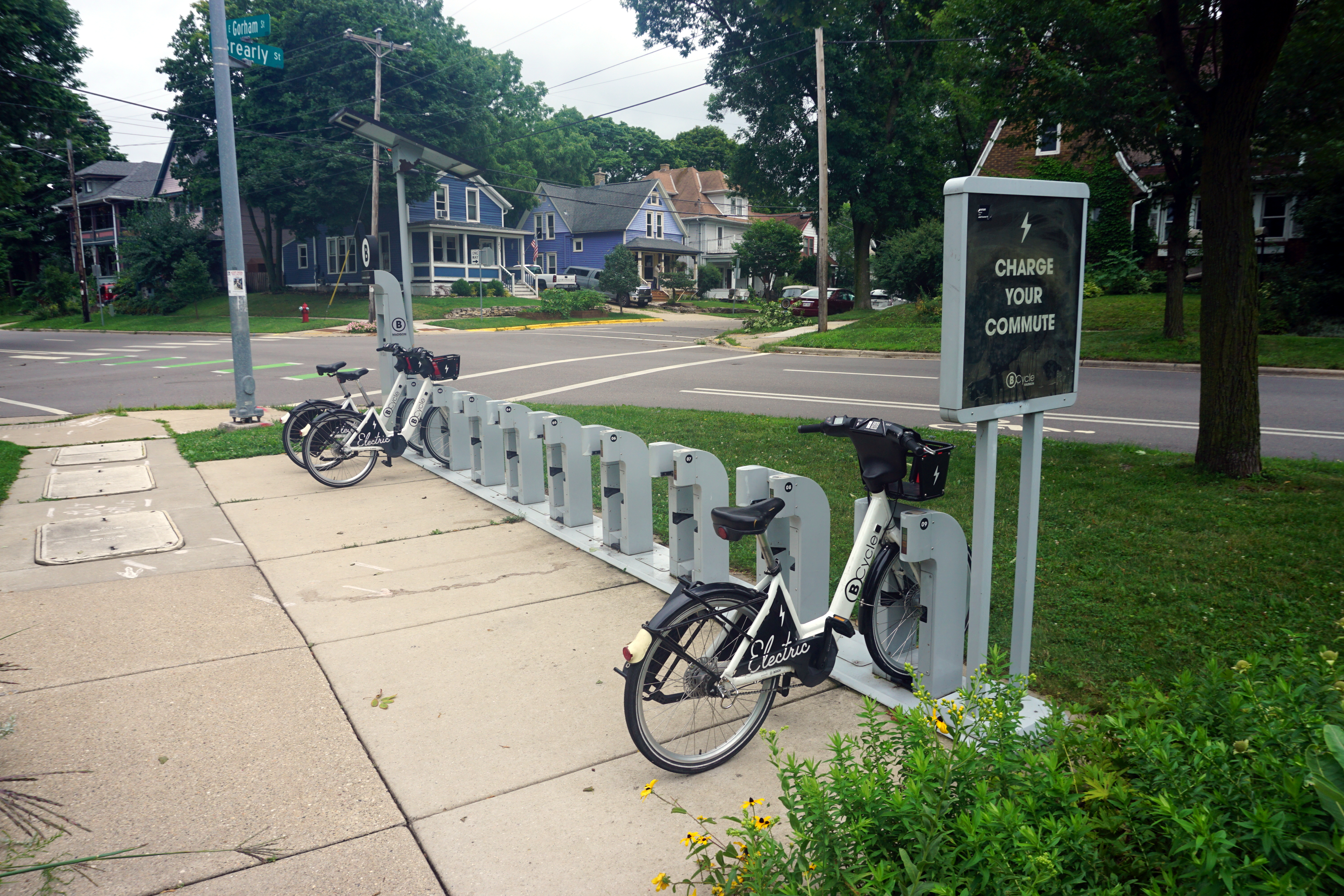
Madison BCycle station

Bublr Bikes station in Milwaukee

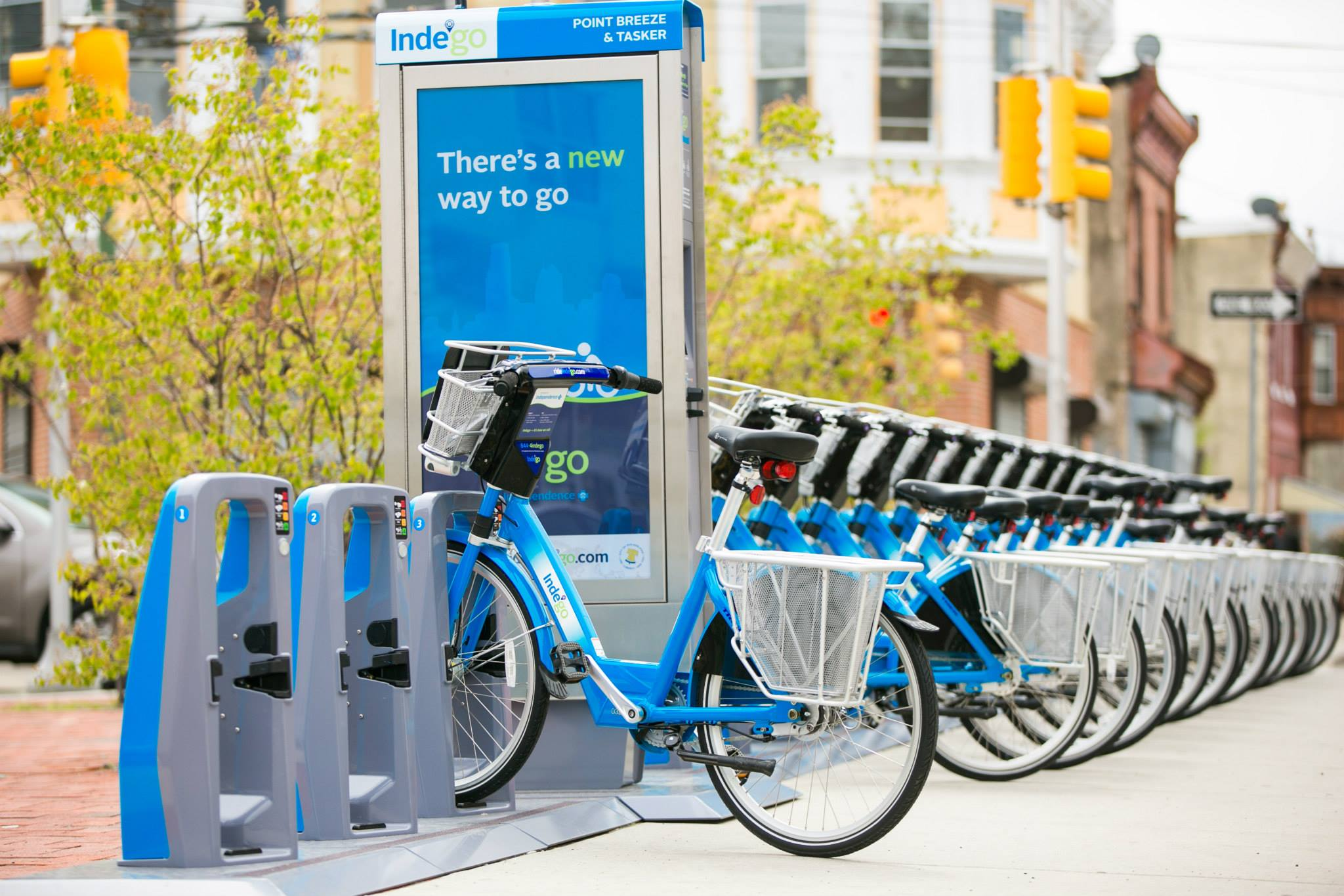
Philly Indego Bikeshare

As of January 2024, B-cycle has bicycle sharing systems in the following areas:

=== United States ===
- Austin, Texas
- Aventura, Florida
- Bentonville, Arkansas
- Bismarck, North Dakota
- Boulder, Colorado
- Charlotte, North Carolina
- Cincinnati, Ohio (Operates under the name Red Bike)
- Clarksville, Tennessee
- Des Moines, Iowa
- El Paso, Texas
- Encinitas, California
- Fort Worth, Texas (Operates under the name Fort Worth Bike Sharing)
- Fort Lauderdale, Florida
- Greenville, South Carolina
- Houston, Texas
- Indianapolis, Indiana (Operates under the name Indiana Pacers Bikeshare)
- Jackson County, Michigan
- Las Vegas, Nevada (Operates under the name RTC Bike Share)
- Lincoln, Nebraska (Operates under the name BikeLNK)
- Los Angeles, California (Operates under the name Metro Bike Share)
- Madison, Wisconsin
- Memphis, Tennessee (Operates under the name Explore Bike Share)
- Milwaukee, Wisconsin (Operates under the name Bublr Bikes)
- Nashville, Tennessee
- Omaha, Nebraska (Operates under the name Heartland Bike Share)
- Philadelphia, Pennsylvania (Operates under the name Indego)
- Redding, California
- Salt Lake City, Utah (Operates under the name GREENbike)
- San Antonio, Texas (Operates under the name SWell Cycle)
- Santa Barbara, California
- Santa Cruz, California
- Truckee, California
- Valentine, Nebraska
- Weslaco, Texas

== See also ==
- Bicycle-sharing system
- Utility cycling - Short-term hire schemes
- Motivate (New York / Boston / Washington DC / San Francisco / Chicago / Toronto / Seattle / Melbourne)
- Vélo'v (Lyon, France)
- Vélib' (Paris, France)
- Bicing (Barcelona, Spain)
- Santander Cycles (London's BIXI-based system)
- PBSC Urban Solutions
- Zagster
