= Indego =

Bike sharing system in Philadelphia, Pennsylvania, United States

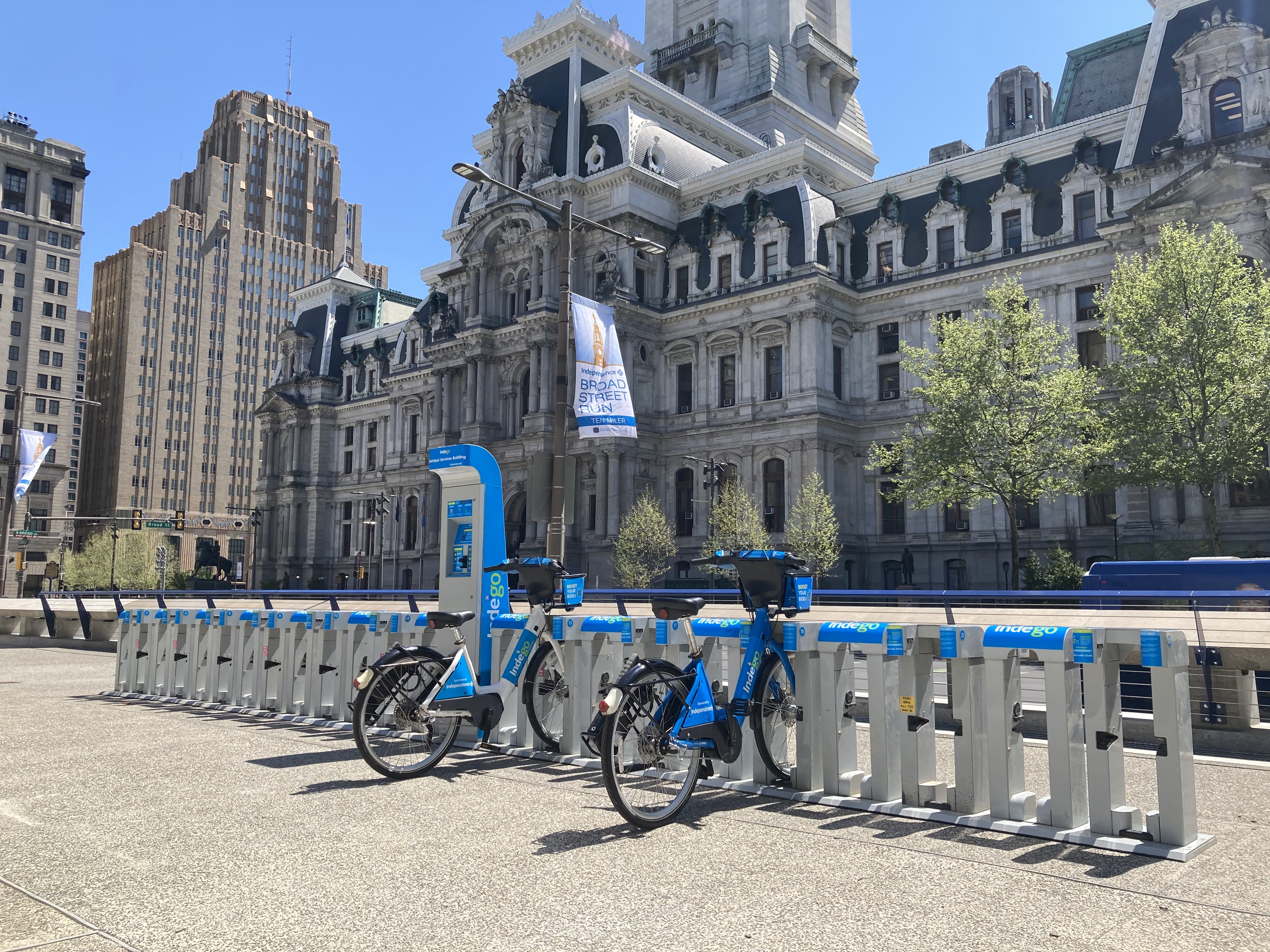

Overview
- Owner: City of Philadelphia
- Locale: Philadelphia, PA
- Transit type: Bicycle-sharing system
- Number of stations: 304
- Website: rideindego.com

Operation
- Began operation: April 23, 2015; 11 years ago
- Operator: Revolution BTS
- Number of vehicles: 2,500

Indego is a public bicycle sharing system serving the city of Philadelphia. Operations started on April 23, 2015, with 125 stations and 1,000 bikes. As of 2026, the system operates over 300 stations and over 3,000 bicycles. The system is operated by Revolution BTS, a Philadelphia-based company formed after the merger of BCycle and Bicycle Transit Systems. The stations and bicycles are owned by the City of Philadelphia.

== History ==
=== Planning and launch ===
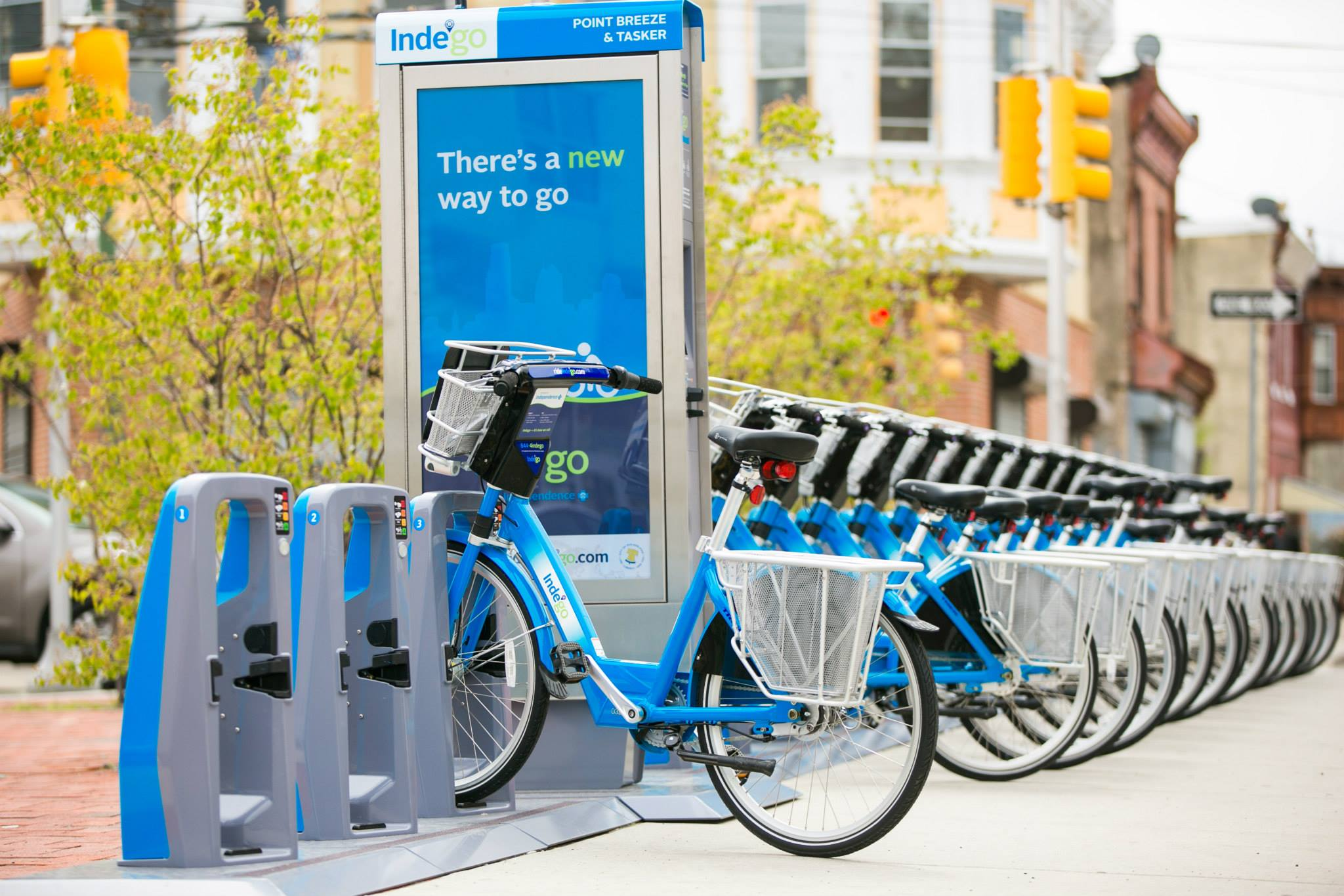
An Indego Station in the Point Breeze neighborhood of South Philadelphia at system launch.

In June 2008, Philadelphia City Council voted on a resolution “requesting the Administration and the Deputy Mayor of Transportation and Utilities to commission a study to provide recommendations on location, demand, and usage for Public Use Bicycle stations for the entire area encompassed by the city limits of Philadelphia and to explore the various business models used for such systems”. The feasibility study was released on February 25, 2010, and suggested “a first phase deployment of 1,750 bikes” in the central districts of the city.

In December 2012, the City Council voted a $3 millions contribution to start the program, on the request of Philadelphia mayor, Michael Nutter.

A strategic business plan was released by the city of Philadelphia in August 2013, prepared by Toole Design Group, LLC and Foursquare ITP. After a request for proposal issued in October 2013, Philadelphia announced on April 24, 2014 that Bicycle Transit System has been selected to plan and operate the system, while B-cycle will provide the bikes, the stations and the technology platform. Launch is planned for Spring 2015, with 60 stations and 600 bikes.

In fall 2014, the city of Philadelphia surveyed residents for best station locations, receiving 10,500 public comments. On February 11, 2015 the city announced the system would be launched on April 23, with Independence Blue Cross being the main sponsor. Indego was the first bike share system in the U.S. to focus its initial rollout in low-income areas, with one third of stations located in low-income neighborhoods.

=== Continued growth ===
In April 2016, Indego announced 24 new stations and added 300 bicycles to the fleet. Indego also implemented a reduced payment plan for low income residents.

In November 2018, Indego deposited 10 e-bikes at various stations around the city. In May 2019, the company evaluated test run as successful and announced plans to add 400 more electric bikes along with 12 new stations.

As of 2024, yearly ridership surpassed 1 million trips. According to a City of Philadelphia press release, Indego ranks as the 6th highest-utilization public transit system in the state of Pennsylvania.

In June 2026, Indego experienced their ten highest ridership days, all during the 2026 FIFA World Cup. The busiest day in the system was Juneteenth, with 8,820 trips.

== Pricing ==
Indego offers five plans:

- Single Ride, one 30-minute ride on any bike for $4.50, plus e-bike usage fees of 20 cents per minute for pedal assist e-bikes.
- Indego30, a 30-day membership for $20. It allows unlimited trips up to one hour (the user is charged 20 cents per minute after the first hour of each rental.) This plan can be paid with credit card online. A discounted membership for low income residents with ACCESS cards is available for $5 per month.
- Indego365, an annual membership for $156 per year, which does not include e-bike rides.
- Indego365 Plus, an annual membership which also includes two 30-minute e-bike rides each day, for a cost of $230 per year.
- Guest Pass, a 24-hour pass for $15. It allows unlimited trips up to one hour (the user is charged 20 cents per minute after the first hour of each rental).
- Indego Corporate Pass Program, distributed through jawnt.

== See also ==
- Bicycle Coalition of Greater Philadelphia
- List of bicycle-sharing systems
