= Rowlandville, Philadelphia =

Historic neighborhood in North Philadelphia

Rowlandville was a North Philadelphia neighborhood along the Tacony Creek near present-day Wyoming Avenue. The name Rowlandville is no longer used; the neighborhood has been absorbed into present-day Juniata Park and Feltonville.

It was bounded by Feltonville to the east/northeast, Juniata Park and Golf Course to the south, Greenwood Cemetery and Tacony Creek Park to the north and Frankford to the east. It was formed about where the Wingohocking Creek merges with the Tacony Creek. Fisher's Lane Bridge still stands near the center of the neighborhood.

== History ==
Early settlement concentrated about a saw manufacturer here, a paper mill and a wagon-spring manufacturer. Founded in 1732, The Rowland Company was the brainchild of Benjamin Rowland, "a descendant of John Rowland who arrived in America with William Penn in 1682." As the "oldest continuing company" in Pennsylvania, it is the third oldest in the country.

William Rowland (1780-1857) had a mill saw factory on the Tacony Creek in 1843. Sons of Benjamin Rowland named their concern The William and Harvey Rowland Company, which succeeded into the 19th century. They made wagon and coach springs. There was also the Benjamin Rowland shovel factory located on Tacony Creek that made spades as well. It was under Benjamin Rowland, Jr., Thomas Rowland and Thomas Rowland, Jr., as well.

A school was erected here in 1846 that was used by the Philadelphia school board in 1886 until the erection of the Rolandville School nearby in 1891. Another schoolhouse was erected in 1889 at Fishers Lane & Wyoming Avenue.

Campbell's Old Towns and Districts of Philadelphia states:

Rowlandville lay along Fisher lane and the Tacony creek, under the Wyoming avenue viaduct, north of the junction with the Wingohocking creek. The Rowlands of Milltown (now Cheltenham) established the manufacture of wagon springs here in 1842; the factory, operated for years by William and Harvey Rowland, is gone, but Fisher lane still runs to the east, crossing the Tacony by a stone bridge (1796), and leading up the hill to Ramona avenue, near the Sears-Roebuck store. Wyoming Villa was near D and Wyoming avenue, at a point where Fisher lane ran north and south, northeast of Greenmount cemetery.
