= Frankford High School =

Coordinates: 40.022°N 75.085°W

Location
- Oxford Avenue and Wakeling Street, Philadelphia, Pennsylvania 19124; United States

Information
- Type: Public High School
- Motto: Home of Champions
- Established: 1910
- School district: School District of Philadelphia
- Principal: Mary A. Jackson
- Teaching staff: 87.40 (FTE)
- Enrollment: 857 (2023–2024)
- Student to teacher ratio: 9.81
- Colors: Gold, royal blue, and crimson
- Slogan: Home of Champions
- Mascot: Frontier Pioneer
- Website: frankfordhs.philasd.org

Frankford High School is a public high school in the School District of Philadelphia. It is located at Oxford Avenue and Wakeling Street in the Frankford section of Northeast Philadelphia, Pennsylvania.

Frankford was founded in 1910 as an annex to Central High School. Around 1927, the Frankford Radio Club, a long-running amateur radio club, was founded at the school. This competitive radio club continues to this day; Alburtis, Pennsylvania, is the current home of the club.

In the fall of 2018, Frankford High School launched the Frankford High School Aviation Academy, a unique program to provide a career path for the graduates of the program. Since the launch of the aviation program, Hospitality and Solar Panel CTE courses have been added as well.

The current acting Principal is Mary A. Jackson.

== Aviation Academy ==
Beginning with the class of 2022, students have the opportunity to enroll in the Aviation Academy. After their completion, they can earn their private pilot license and by the time they are 21 be eligible for their commercial pilot license. The program will also include multiple tracks of study including drone-piloting and airplane mechanic/maintenance.

== Sports ==
Having been founded as an annex to Central High School, Frankford inherited the gold and crimson from Central, but the addition of navy blue makes the school's colors distinctive. Frankford's slogan is "Home of Champions," a nod to its longstanding tradition of fielding strong sports teams. The school's athletic teams are nicknamed the Pioneers.

Frankford's soccer team won ten straight Public League Championships (1987–1996), four of which by shutout. Frankford's wrestling team won 11 straight Public League Championships ending in 2007.

== Neighborhoods served ==
Neighborhoods served by the school include Bridesburg, Frankford, Northwood, Wissinoming, Oxford Circle, and Juniata.

== Feeder patterns ==
Harding Middle School is Frankford's most significant feeder school, or one in which its graduating students matriculate to Frankford High.

== Notable alumni ==
- Zaire Anderson, NFL player
- Joe Bonsall, singer The Oak Ridge Boys
- Vince DeMentri, news anchor
- John Diehl, former NFL player
- Christine Duffy, business executive
- Jahri Evans, Green Bay Packers, New Orleans Saints offensive guard
- Bobby Higginson, former Detroit Tigers outfielder
- Mike Jarmoluk, former Philadelphia Eagles defensive end
- Robert Lowe Kunzig, attorney and judge
- Ralph Lewis, former La Salle University and NBA guard
- Jonathan Maberry, author and educator
- Hector Andres Negroni, Air Force Fighter Pilot, Historian
- John Richter, NBA basketball player
- Kaboni Savage, drug dealer and murderer
- Blair Thomas, former Penn State and NFL running back
- George W. Taylor (professor) (July 10, 1901 – December 15, 1972) class of 1919: was a professor of industrial relations at the Wharton School at the University of Pennsylvania, who is credited with founding the academic field of study known as industrial relations
- Isaiah Thomas, Philadelphia City Council member

== See also ==
- Northeast Philadelphia
