= David Wilmot =

David Wilmot may refer to:

- David Wilmot (politician)
- David Wilmot (actor)

== See also ==
- David Wilmot School, named for the politician
