= Enoch Edwards =

Enoch Edwards may refer to:

- Enoch Edwards (trade unionist)
- Enoch Edwards (surgeon)
