= Oswald Eve =

American mariner and ship chandler

Oswell Eve, sometimes referred to simply as Oswald (c. 1715 – 1793, New Providence Island, The Bahamas), was a mariner, ship chandler, gunpowder manufacturer and member of the American Philosophical Society, in Philadelphia, Pennsylvania, elected in 1768. He attended the College of Philadelphia and was an associate of Dr. Benjamin Rush, later signer of the Declaration of Independence.

== Early life ==
Eve was born, circa 1715, possibly in Bermondsey, Surrey, England. Eve was a sea captain, and owned and commanded the brigantine Roebuck and the ship George. At the same time, he was a shipping merchant, becoming so prosperous that he part-owned some twenty-five other vessels as well. In 1756, he served as a lieutenant in Samuel Mifflin's company of Philadelphia Associators.

== Birth of the Frankford Powder-Mill ==
In 1774, Eve built a water-powered factory for producing gunpowder on Frankford Creek in Frankford, which was then a village outside Philadelphia. Prior to the American Revolutionary War, Eve's powder mill at Wingohocking Street and Adams Avenue, was the only one in operation in the colonies.

Silas Deane writes on July 24, 1775

Yours of the 6th I received Yesterday, and wish it were possible to obtain the Article of Powder, but it is more scarce, & more sought after than Gold.

In the fall of 1775 it became very difficult to get sufficient powder for the Continental army. The Massachusetts Provincial Congress sent Paul Revere to Philadelphia to study the inner workings of Eve's mill. Upon his arrival, he met with Continental Congressmen Robert Morris and John Dickinson who provided the following letter of introduction to present to Oswald Eve:

Sir
Philada. Novr. 21st 1775

I am requested by some Honorable Members of the Congress to recommend the bearer hereof Mr. Paul Revere to you. He is just arrived from New England where it is discovered they can manufacture a good deal of Salt Petre in Consequence of which they desire to Erect a Powder Mill & Mr. Revere has been pitched upon to gain instruction & Knowledge in this branch. A Powder Mill in New England cannot in the least degree affect your Manufacture nor be of any disadvantage to you. Therefore these Gentn & myself hope You will Chearfully & from Public Spirited Motives give Mr. Revere such information as will inable him to Conduct the business on his return home. I shall be glad of any opportunity to approve myself.

Sir
Your very Obed Servt.
Robt Morris

P.S. Mr. Revere will desire to see the Construction of your Mill & I hope you will gratify him in that point.

Sir, I heartily join with Mr. Morris in his Request; and am with great Respect, Your very hble Servt. John Dickinson

On January 11, 1776, Eve signed a contract with Committee of Secrecy of the Continental Congress to supply gunpowder at $8 per hundredweight, with Congress supplying the niter. Because Eve had complied with the request of Congress and allowed Revere to pass through his powder manufactory, thus allowing him to obtain sufficient information that enabled him to set up a powder mill at Canton, Eve petitioned Congress for a reward:

In Committee of Safety, Philadelphia, May 3, 1776.

SIR: This Committee having considered the petition of Mr. Oswell Eve, are of opinion it should be laid before the honourable Congress; and they take the liberty of sending it to you for that purpose; at the same time, they certify that Mr. Eve has at different times, upon the recommendation of this Board, shown his works and improvements to such gentlemen as were appointed from this and the neighbouring Colonies to view the same.

I am, sir, your most obedient, humble servant,

JOHN NIXON, Chairman.

To the Honourable John Hancock, Esq.

=== Mill Legacy ===
The Powder-Mill on Frankford Creek became the working model that was studied by all the other colonies for building their own mills in the production of gunpowder. When the British occupied Philadelphia in September 1777, they took over the mill, and it was rumored that Eve cooperated. On March 6, 1778, the Supreme Executive Council found Eve found guilty of treason for trading with the British, but he was allowed to leave the city when the British evacuated in Spring 1778, leaving his son Oswell Jr. in charge of the mill. However, on July 6, 1778, all his property, including the powder mills and 202 acres (0.82 km^{2}), were confiscated.

At the conclusion of the Revolution, Eve fled with his wife to Nassau, Bahamas, where he died in his son Joseph's house in New Providence in 1793.

== Family ==
Eve was married to Anne Moore in Christ Church, Philadelphia on June 2, 1744. The couple had thirteen children, of whom seven died in infancy.

One daughter, Sarah Eve, was an intimate friend of the family of Dr. Benjamin Rush, with whom she was eventually engaged to be married. However, In September 1774, she came down with a lingering illness, believed to have been tuberculosis, and died just three weeks before their wedding was to take place on Christmas of that year.

Another of Eve's sons, Joseph, came under the tutelage of Dr. Rush and became a medical doctor.
