= Frankford, Philadelphia =

Frankford Neighborhood of Philadelphia
- Former Borough
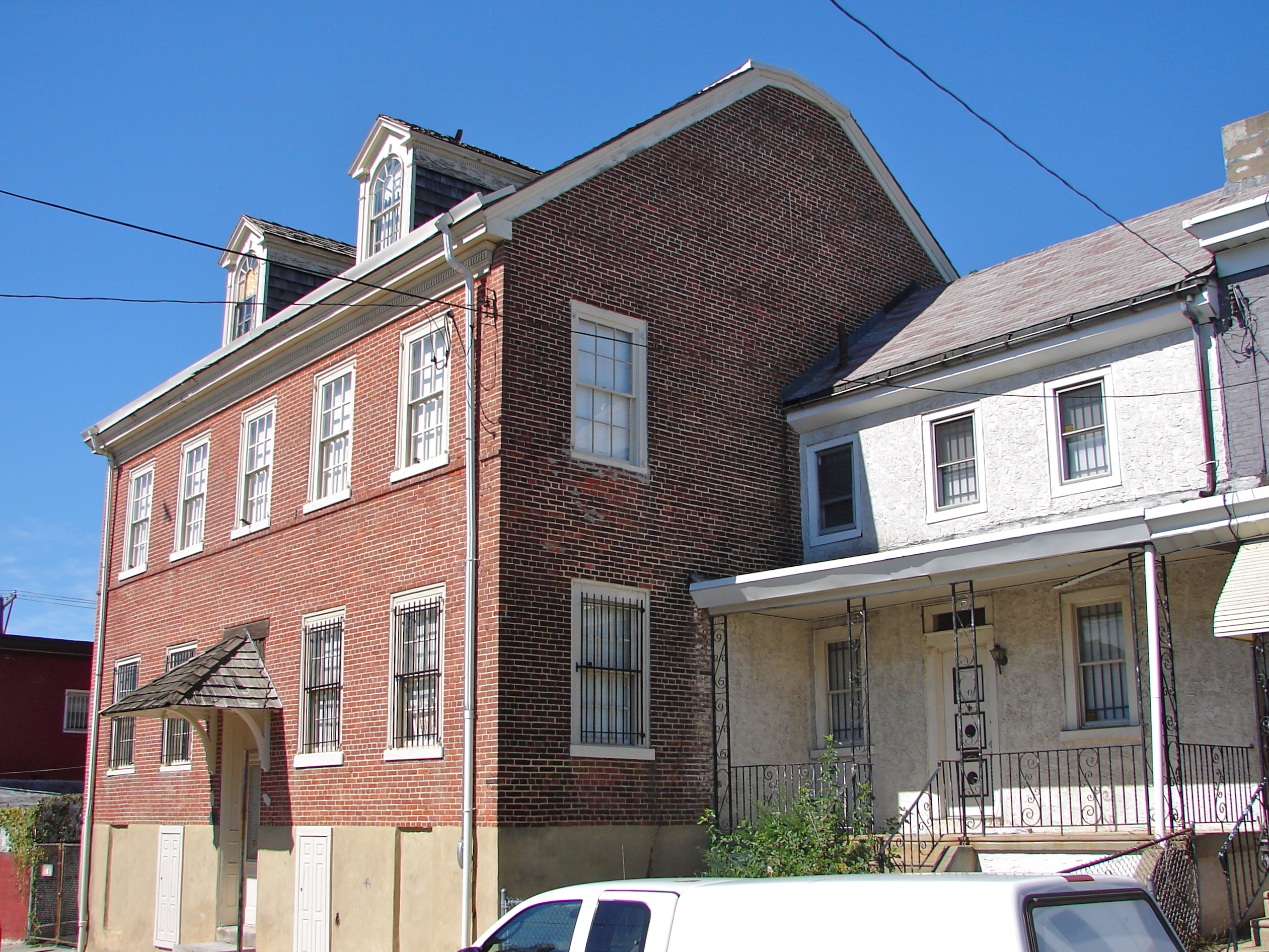
- John Ruan House

- Location of Frankford Frankford; Neighborhood of Philadelphia (Pennsylvania) Frankford; Neighborhood of Philadelphia (the United States)
- Country: United States
- State: Pennsylvania
- County: Philadelphia
- Time zone: UTC-5 (EST)
  - Summer (DST): UTC-4 (EDT)
- Area codes: 215, 267, and 445

Thomas Holme's Survey Map (1687)

Frankford is a neighborhood in the Northeast section of Philadelphia situated about six miles (10 km) northeast of Center City. Although its borders are vaguely defined, the neighborhood is bounded roughly by the original course of Frankford Creek on the south to Castor Ave and Roosevelt boulevard on the northwest and southwest, to Cheltenham Avenue on the north, and to Aramingo Avenue and I-95 on the east. Adjacent neighborhoods are Bridesburg, Juniata, Northwood, Summerdale, and Wissinoming.

Historically, Frankford had an unofficial division separating Frankford (proper) from East Frankford, which encompassed the area east of Frankford Avenue. The division divided the community first along racial lines, with African Americans to the east of Frankford Avenue and Caucasians to the west.

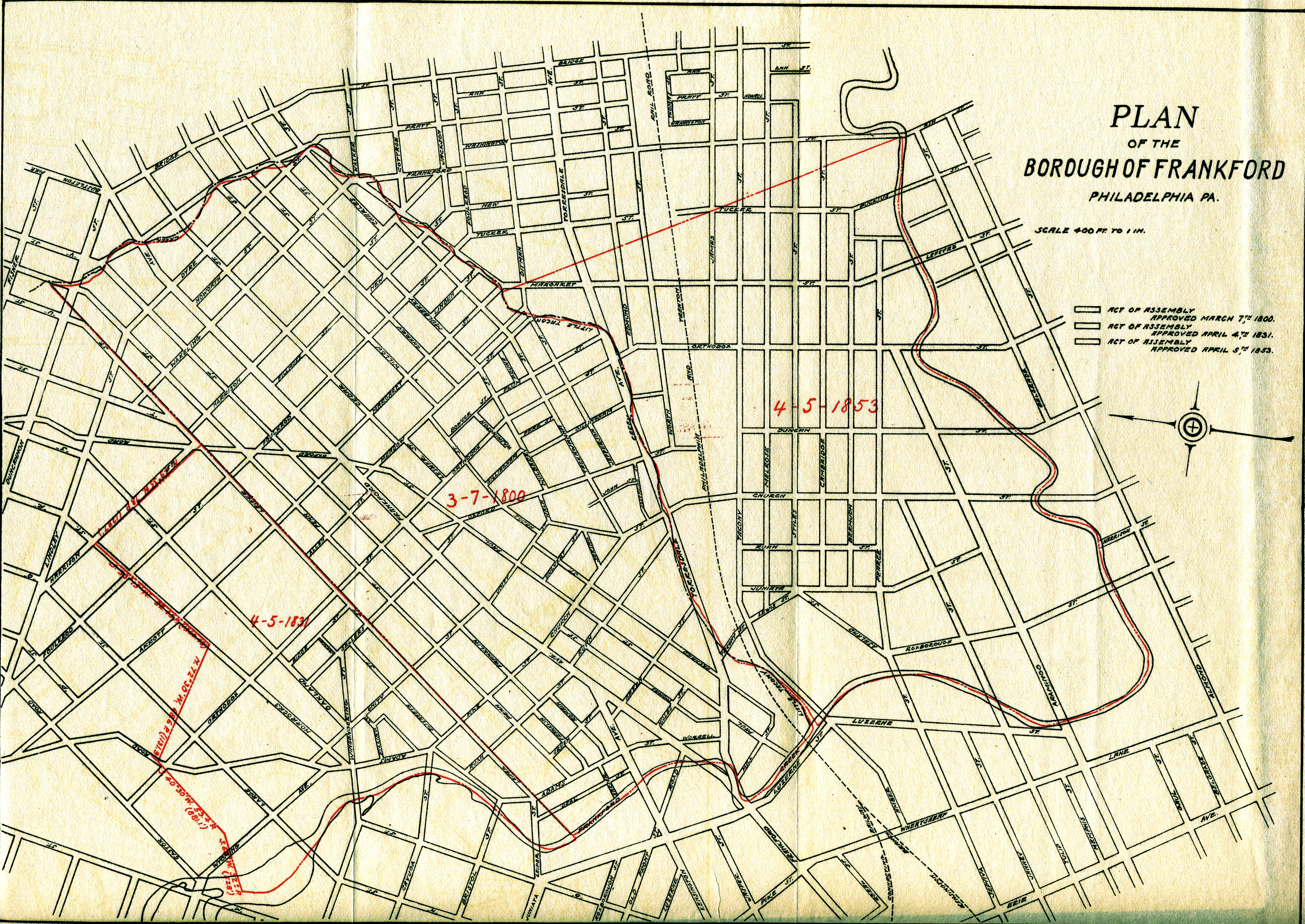
A map of Philadelphia County, Pennsylvania Showing Frankford Borough prior to and after the Act of Consolidation, 1854

== History ==
The village of Frankford was established by the Quakers in about 1682 in an area formerly occupied by Dutch people (Nederlanders). At the time of Penn's arrival it was occupied by Swedes, Finns and Native Americans.

The land known as the Manor of Frank was purchased by the Free Society of Traders, a group of Quaker businessmen in England. The original settlers were Henry Waddy, Thomas Fairman, Robert Adam, and Edward Seary.

The village very likely took its name from the title of the Frankfurt Company, which took up ground there, along what is now known as Frankford Creek, in the lower part of Oxford Township.

Frankford Creek's upper tributaries were the Tacony Creek and the Wingohocking Creek; while its lower tributaries are the Little Tacony Creek and the Freaheatah.

Frankford Old Home Week with "Ye Old Dummy Depot" in 1909

Frankford was an early suburb of the town of Philadelphia. William Penn forged a trail through the village running from the original town (now Center City) to New York City, passing through Bucks County near the site of his home, Pennsbury Manor. That trail came to be known as "Frankford Pike" (later Frankford Avenue) and was the town's main street.

The village was incorporated into a borough on March 2, 1800, bounded by Leiper Street on the northwest, Little Tacony (or Tackawanna) Creek on the south and east, and Frankford Creek on the west. By an act on April 4, 1831, the boundaries of the borough were extended to include land to the northwest of Leiper Street, the line running along Harrison and Horrocks Streets, to a point on Frankford Creek below Wyoming Avenue. In 1853, the part of Whitehall Borough lying between Torresdale and Frankford Avenues below what is now Whitehall Common was added, to encompass a total of 1.468 square miles. In 1854, the borough was annexed by the city of Philadelphia through the Act of Consolidation, 1854.

Frankford was historically a manufacturing center, beginning with a gristmill constructed in the 1660s. This same mill became famous during the American Revolutionary War due to the heroics of Lydia Darrah.

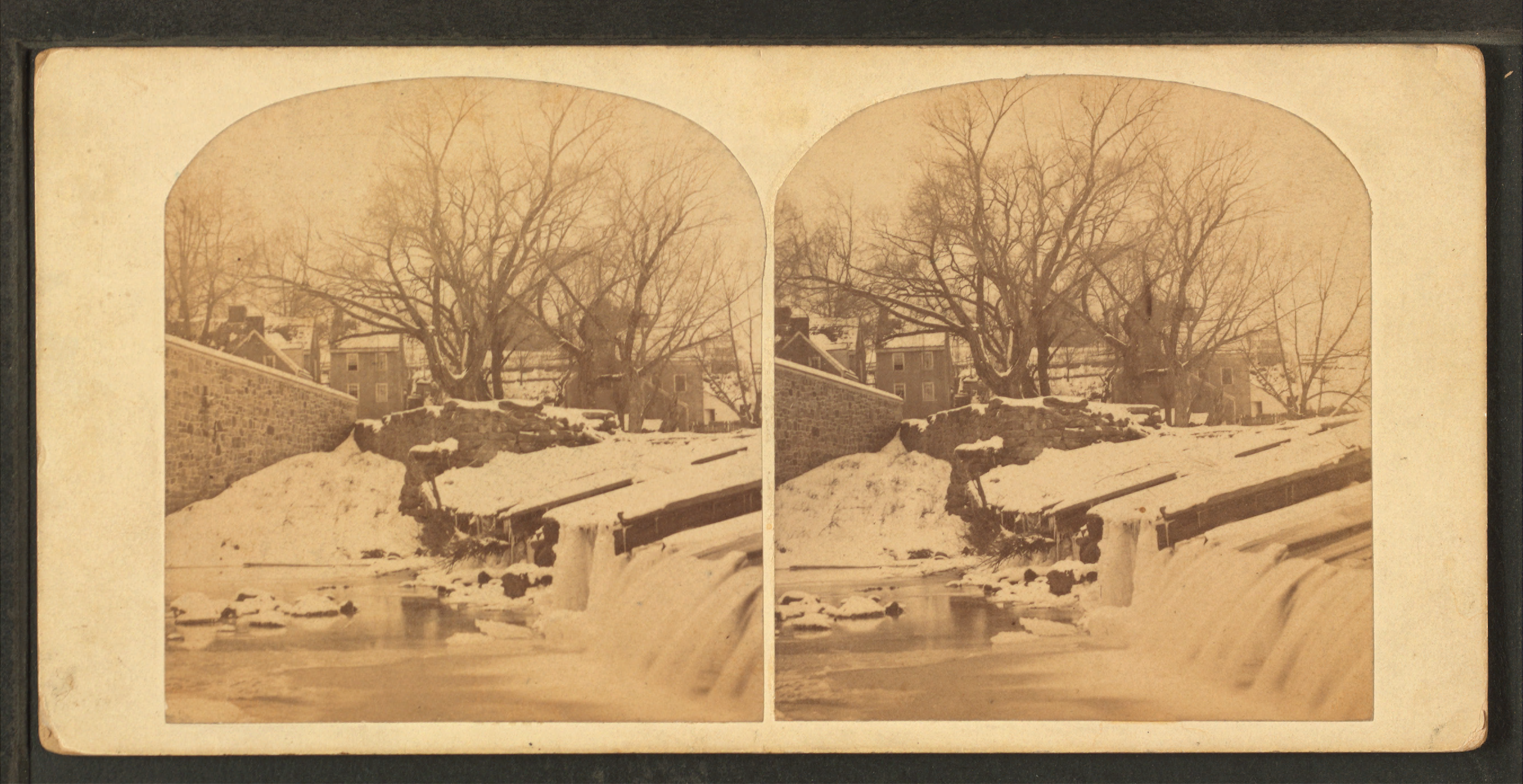
Collapsed mill-dam, 19th century

Before and during the Revolution, two lesser-known grist-mills operated on the creek above the town of Frankford.

In 1771, Robert Morris (a miller) purchased a mill at the junction of the Tacony Creek and Frankford Creek.

On November 25, 1773, after receiving permission to dam the creek from a Quaker named Nicholas Waln, a feme-sole trader named Mary Peters established a small grist mill. She was in a partnership with Richard Whitman of Oxford Township, Philadelphia County.

Frankford also has the distinction of having played a role in the Declaration of Independence.

"There is also a tradition that on the afternoon of that day, or possibly a day or two earlier, there was a joyful private celebration of the great event, by Jefferson and others, at the garden-house of a country-seat in Frankford (near Philadelphia), then occupied by Dr. Enoch Edwards, a leading patriot of that time."

Frankford was also the site of a gunpowder mill that became famous because of its association with Oswald Eve and Paul Revere.

In the 19th century, the town became a center for textile production. Other manufacturing industries also flourished. An early description of industry in 1837:

The borough of Frankford, on the Delaware, is the seat of numerous manufacturing establishments, including several cotton mills, calico print-works and bleacheries, woolen mills, ironworks, & etc. Here are also an Arsenal of the United States, and a Lunatic Asylum belonging to the Friends.

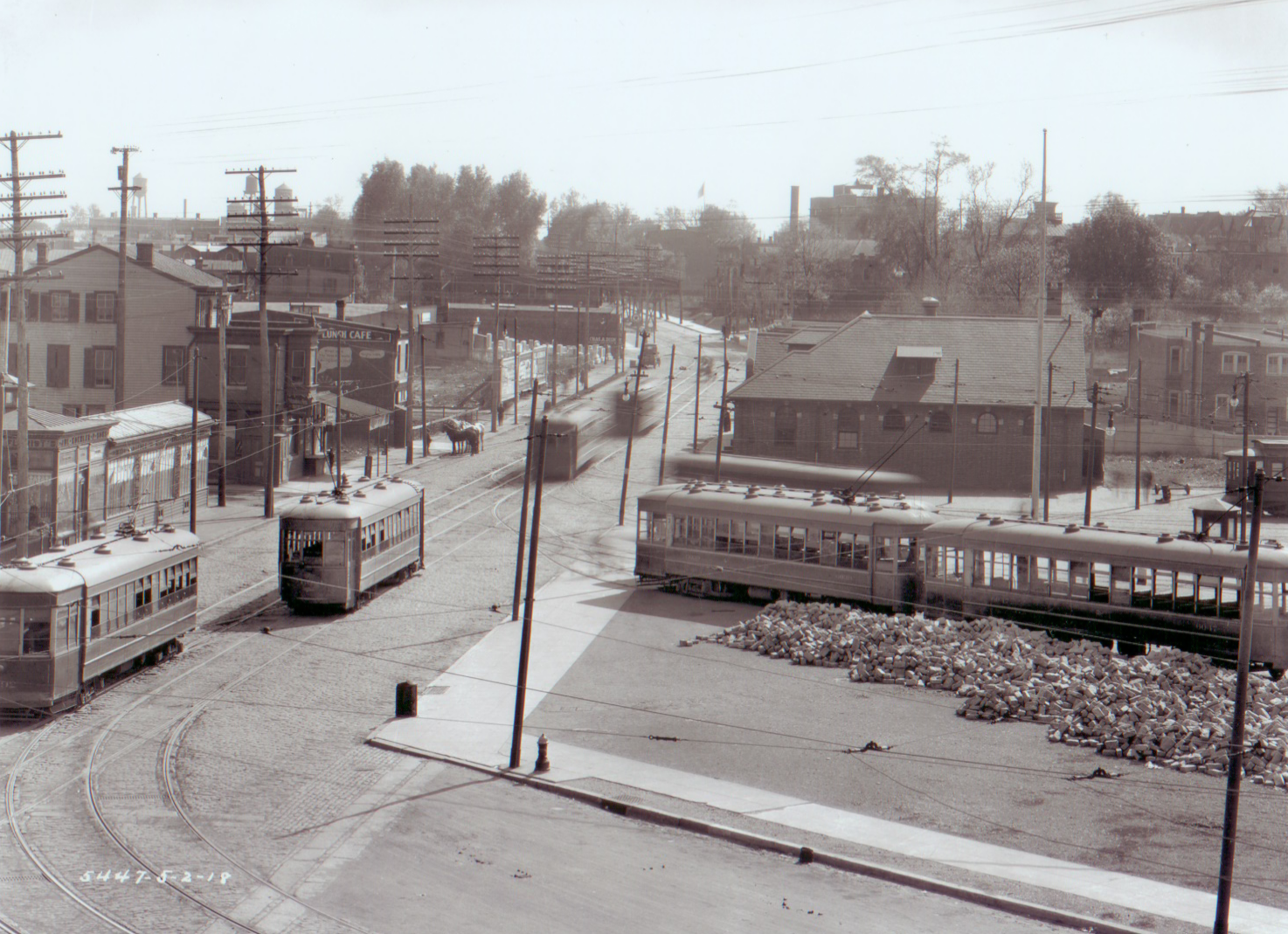
Frankford Terminal in 1918, before the construction of the Frankford El.

The Frankford Arsenal rivaled the Philadelphia Navy Yard during World War II. It provided over 22,000 jobs and at its peak, produced 8 million bullets per day.

In 1922, the Frankford Elevated Line opened, connecting to the Market Street Elevated to provide rapid-transit access to Center City and West Philadelphia. The terminus of today's SEPTA Market-Frankford Line, now known as the Frankford Transportation Center, became a major transit hub, with connections to bus and trolley routes extending into Northeast Philadelphia. Residents of Frankford live within walking distance of the terminal. SEPTA's elevated train (the "El") runs through the neighborhood above Frankford Avenue.

Although the Frankford Line helped catapult Frankford Avenue into a major shopping district in the early 20th century, the traditionally working-class neighborhood saw decline in the 1950s as many Philadelphians moved to the suburbs. White flight eventually took its hold on the neighborhood throughout the 1970s and 1980s. By 1990, over 30% of the storefronts on Frankford Avenue were vacant.

Since this time, Frankford has seen a push for improvement. In 1993, the Philadelphia City Planning Commission adopted the Frankford Plan as a blueprint for revitalizing the neighborhood. Although many vacant storefronts remain, businesses catering to new customers have opened in recent years.

Many business owners hope that gentrification of neighborhoods such as Fishtown and Kensington will spread north into Frankford. Others worry that previous attempts at improving Frankford have not been as effective as hoped, with most areas of the neighborhood still suffering from street crime and open-air drug sales. Between 1985 and 1990, a serial killer known as the "Frankford Slasher" murdered several women in the neighborhood. Although several suspects were taken into custody, the actual killer has never been identified.

== Notable sites ==
=== Museums ===
- Grand Army of the Republic Museum and Library, 4278 Griscom St.
- Historical Society of Frankford, established 1905, 1507 Orthodox St.

=== Churches ===
- The Baptist Worship Center, 4355 Paul St.
- St. Bartholomew R.C. Church, 5600 Jackson St.
- By Grace Alone Christian Reformed Church, 1300 Dyre Street
- Campbell African Methodist Episcopal Church, 1657 Kinsey St., founded 1804
- Central United Methodist Church, 4620 Griscom St.
- Christ Independent Baptist Church, 1618 Womrath St.
- The Church of Jesus Christ of Latter-day Saints, 4610 Frankford Ave.
- Sixth Church of Christ, Scientist, 4720 Leiper St.
- Crossroads Community Church, 4624 Leiper St.
- Faith Assembly of God, 5049 Charles St.
- Faith Tabernacle, 1744 Foulkrod St.
- Frankford Friends Meeting House, 4371 Waln St., established 1684
- Frankford Memorial United Methodist Church, 1300 Dyre St.
- Hermon Presbyterian Church, 4835 Frankford Ave.
- Holy Cross Church of Christ, 1822 Orthodox St.
- International Druidic Society, 4455 Frankford Ave.
- St. James Lutheran Church, Pratt St. and Castor Ave.
- St. Joachim Church, Philadelphia, 1527 Church St., established 1845
- St. John Apostolic Church, 4404-06 Paul St.
- St. Mark's Church, Frankford, 4442 Frankford Ave., is an Episcopal Church, established 1832
- Mar Thoma Church
- St. Mary's Malankara Orthodox Syrian Cathedral, 1424 Orthodox St.
- Mizpah Seventh-day Adventist Church, 4355 Paul St.
- Church Of Christ (Iglesia Ni Cristo), 1676 Ruan St.
- By Grace Alone Frankford Fellowship, 4730 Oxford Ave.
- New Beginning Church of Philadelphia, 4200 Roosevelt Blvd, 19124
- Northeast Baptist Church, 4744 Tackawanna St.
- Christ Fellowship Christian Church, 1639 Harrison St.,
- The Presbyterian Church of Frankford, 4302 Frankford Ave., dating to 1605, was begun as a German-speaking reformed church
- Rehoboth United Methodist Church, 4229 Paul St.
- Second Baptist Church of Frankford, 1801 Meadow St.
- Second Spanish Baptist Church, 4917 Frankford Ave. (began as North Frankford Baptist Church – given to Second Spanish Baptist in the early 1990s)
- Strait Gate Church of Faith and Deliverance, Inc., 4265 Frankford Ave.
- St. Thomas United Methodist Church, 4701 Tackawanna St.
- St. Valentine's Polish National Church, 2330 Margaret St.
- Word of Faith Christian Center, 4355 Paul St.
- Strait Gate Ministries, Inc. 4460-2 Frankford Ave.

=== Schools ===
- The Charter School of Arts & Science: String Theory (formerly Henry R. Edmunds School), 1197 Haworth St.
- First Philadelphia Charter School for Literacy, 4300 Tacony St.
- Frankford Friends School, 1500 Orthodox St.
- Frankford High School, 5000 Oxford Ave.
- Frankford Hospital School of Nursing, 4918 Penn St.
- Warren G. Harding Middle School, 2000 Wakeling St.
- John Marshall School, Sellers and Griscom Sts.
- Northwood Academy Charter School, 4621 Castor Ave.
- Smedley Elementary School, Bridge and Mulberry Sts.
- Allen M. Stearne Elementary School, 1655 Unity St.
- Mariana Bracetti Academy Charter School, 1840 Torresdale Ave.

=== Historic sites ===
- Garden-House, owned by Dr. Enoch Edwards, where Jefferson and others celebrated the passage of the Declaration is present-day Womrath Park. (Demolished)
- Cedar Hill Cemetery, established 1849
- Oswald Eve's gunpowder mill, built 1774. (Demolished)
- Frankford Community Memorial Stadium, opened 1922, site of several games of the Frankford Yellow Jackets professional football team.
- Frankford Avenue, formerly Main Street, and before that the King's Highway

==== Philadelphia Register of Historic Places ====
- Campbell African Methodist Episcopal Church of Frankford (sometimes called Second Bethel or Little Bethel), 1657 Kinsey St., founded circa 1804. After an earlier application for the National Historic Register was rejected, Campbell AME was placed on the Philadelphia Register of Historic Places in 1982. The burial ground was nominated in a separate application because archeology was not a criterion listed on Philadelphia's early nomination applications. This burial ground was approved and placed onto the Philadelphia Register 11 February 2022.
- Comly Rich House (built 1826), 4276 Orchard Street, was the first house in the United States to receive a mortgage (1831)
- David Wilmot School
- The Free Burying Ground of Frankford aka Potter’s Field or Wilmot Cemetery, 1801 Meadow St., enacted into Ordinance the 15th day of October 1811 by Isaac Worrell Chief Burgess. The Nomination was approved and was placed on the Philadelphia Register of Historic Places 30 August 2021.

Nathan Harper and Mary his Wife granted unto the said Burgesses and Inhabitants of the said Borough of Frankford with this deed restriction: "To be occupied as a public burying Ground forever hereafter for the Dead of All Nations Sects and Colours without any charge what ever except the Customary expenses of digging and keeping up the Graves to the only use of a public burying ground free and clear of and from all Judgments heirs and other Incumbrances whatsoever..." The Burial Ground (now a playground) contains the remains of many African American Civil War Veterans.

- Greenwood Cemetery, established 1869, where Dr. Benjamin Rush kept a summer home in the late 18th century.

==== National Register of Historic Places ====
- William W. Axe School
- Frankford Arsenal
- Friends Hospital, the first private psychiatric hospital in the U.S., founded 1813
- Warren G. Harding Junior High School
- Henry Longfellow School
- John Marshall School
- The John Ruan House, built 1796
- Franklin Smedley School
- James J. Sullivan School
- David Wilmot School

=== Others ===
- Frankford Hospital
- Eastern Regional Medical Center, a facility of Cancer Treatment Centers of America (formerly Parkview Hospital)

== Northwood ==
Within the bounds of Frankford exists an enclave known as Northwood. Northwood is made up almost entirely of pre-World War II twin and single-family dwellings. Northwood is bounded by Harrison Street to the south, Roosevelt Boulevard to the west and Oxford Avenue to the east, its northernmost point being Sanger Street, just below the intersection of Castor Avenue, Roosevelt Blvd (U.S. 1) and Oxford Avenue. However, a more broad definition of Northwood would extend to Adams Avenue on the south, including the location of Northwood Park and the larger mansions on Castor Avenue south of Harrison Street.

Three of Frankford's schools lie within Northwood. Other facilities in Northwood include Frankford High School's War Memorial Stadium, built in honor of area residents who served in World War I, and Baldwin Field, named for local businessman and philanthropist E. A. Baldwin, who had a milk business in Northwood. The field was dedicated on June 3, 1938.

The neighborhood is home to a mostly middle-class population. The neighborhood was also home to former Philadelphia mayor and Representative from the 5th (then 3rd) Congressional District William J. Green, III, and the late Edward R. Becker, former justice on the Third Circuit Court of Appeals for the United States.

Burk Deed Restriction

In 1881, Alfred and Louis Burk founded Louis Burk, Inc., Philadelphia meat packers, and also built Atlantic City's original Steel Pier in 1898. Several other brothers were engaged in this family-run business. (Another brother, Henry Burk, was a well-known local politician.)

As real-estate investors and developers in Philadelphia, they bought and sold large parcels of land in Northwood. To protect the integrity of the neighborhood, Louis Burk placed several various deed restrictions upon many of the tracts he sold.

=== Northwood Civic Association ===
The Northwood Civic Association received its charter of incorporation as a Pennsylvania not-for-profit corporation during a meeting held in City Hall, Room 577, Philadelphia, Pennsylvania, on Thursday, July 25, 1963, at 3:00 P.M., E.D.S.T., there being present: ISRAEL STIEFEL, ESQ., THE MASTER: BECKER & BECKER BY Edward R. Becker, ESQ., For Petitioners.

J. WALTER KLINE testified:

This corporation was originally started in the spring of 1954, and the main purpose was to try and uphold the quality of the neighborhood – to keep real estate from being depreciated, to promote and preserve the civic, social and moral welfare of the community known as Northwood in the City of Philadelphia, to maintain and elevate the quality of land usage therein, to maintain and elevate the value of real estate therein, to prevent the infiltration of degrading and inharmonious land use therein, to do all other things necessary to preserve and maintain the amenities and high standards of the community, to engage in any peaceable activities including the institution of legal proceedings necessary for the promotion of the purposes, and this is a corporation which does not contemplate pecuniary gains or profit, incident or otherwise, to its members.

== Crime ==
Frankford was the hunting ground for the "Frankford Slasher", who stalked victims between 1985 and 1990.

The intersection of Bridge Street and Hawthorne Street was listed number six in a 2007 list of the city's top ten recreational drug corners according to an article by Philadelphia Weekly reporter Steve Volk.

== Demographics ==
Frankford is a diverse working-class neighborhood, containing a wide variety of ethnic groups, including a large number of Irish Americans, Polish Americans, Italian Americans, Portuguese Americans, Brazilian Americans, Arab Americans, African Americans, Hispanic Americans, specifically from Puerto Rico and the Dominican Republic, and West Indian Americans, mainly from Trinidad and Tobago, Jamaica and Haiti.

As of the census of 2010, the racial makeup of Frankford is 31.8% African American, 30.8% White, 29% Hispanic, and 8.4% other.

The population of Frankford grew by 3% between the 1990 and 2000 censuses.

== Notable people ==
- Butch Ballard, jazz drummer and band leader
- Edward R. Becker, Judge of the United States Court of Appeals for the Third Circuit.
- Jesse Bennett, Physician who carried out North America's first ever Caesarian section procedure and was born in Frankford, Philadelphia in 1769.
- Stephen Decatur Sr. for a time kept a home here.
- Dr. Enoch Edwards kept a summer home in Frankford. He was medical student who studied under Dr. Benjamin Rush, an attending physician to General George Washington. Edwards was also a correspondent to France for Thomas Jefferson and James Monroe.
- Earl G. Harrison, Dean of the University of Pennsylvania Law School; Commissioner of the INS, 1942–44
- William Walker Foulkrod, US Congressman
- Jeanette DuBois Meech (1835–1911), evangelist and industrial educator
- James T. Nulty, Pennsylvania State Senator for the 8th district from 1911 to 1914
- Norman Paris (1925–1977), pianist, arranger, composer, bandleader
- Charles B. Penrose (1798–1857), Pennsylvania State Senator, President pro tempore of the Pennsylvania Senate, Assistant Secretary of the Treasury
- Dr. Benjamin Rush, Continental Congressman and signer of the United States Declaration of Independence, had a summer home here.

== Education ==
Frankford, like all areas of Philadelphia, is served by the School District of Philadelphia. In particular Frankford High School has been the community's public high school since 1910. The Free Library of Philadelphia also operates the Frankford Branch in the neighborhood. The Frankford Hospital School of Nursing operated from 1904 to 2020.

== Sports ==
The community was the home of the Frankford Yellow Jackets, a National Football League team that won the championship in 1926 but folded in 1931. Frankford is also home to the N.E. Frankford Boys and Girls Club American Legion Post 224 Drill Team, who won the AMA Nationals Championship in 2005 and 2006. Also part of the community for decades was the Frankford Boys Club. It was an organization that gave Frankford youth an opportunity to learn how to play football, baseball, softball, basketball and Cheerleading as part of NESAC. The Boys Club was one of NESAC’s flagship organizations and participated in many playoff games and championship victories. During the 90’s and 2000’s they dominated the league in Football and Cheerleading, winning almost every championship in every age group.

== See also ==
- Frankford Special Services District of Philadelphia
