= Warren G. Harding Middle School =

- Warren G. Harding Junior High School
- U.S. National Register of Historic Places
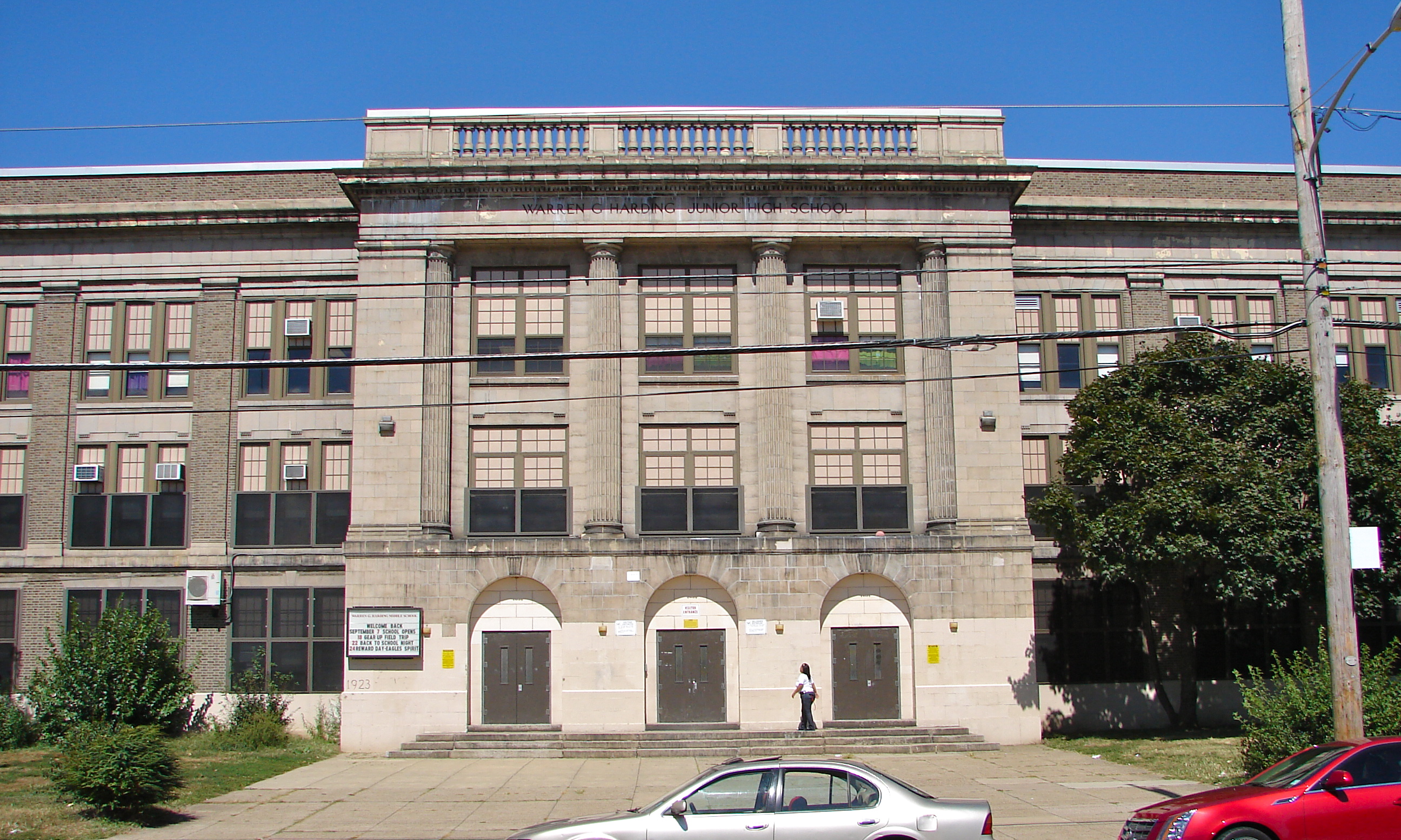
- Warren G. Harding Junior High School, September 2010

- Location within Philadelphia Location within Pennsylvania Location within the United States
- Location: 2000 Wakeling St., Philadelphia, Pennsylvania
- Coordinates: 40.0130°N 75.0740°W
- Area: 8.3 acres (3.4 ha)
- Built: 1923–1924
- Architect: Irwin T. Catharine
- Architectural style: Colonial Revival
- MPS: Philadelphia Public Schools TR
- NRHP reference No.: 88002277
- Added to NRHP: November 18, 1988

The Warren G. Harding Middle School is a historic American middle school in the Frankford neighborhood of Philadelphia, Pennsylvania. It is part of the School District of Philadelphia.

The building was added to the National Register of Historic Places in 1988.

== History and architectural features ==
Designed by Irwin T. Catharine and built between 1923 and 1925 at a cost of just over $1 million, this historic structure is a three-story, seventeen-bay-wide and twelve-bay-deep, brick-and-limestone building that was created in the Colonial Revival style. It features a projecting center entrance pavilion with arched openings, stone cornice, and balustraded parapet. The school was named after former President Warren G. Harding.
