= John Ruan House =

Historic house in Pennsylvania, United States

- Ruan Mostert House
- U.S. National Register of Historic Places
- Philadelphia Register of Historic Places
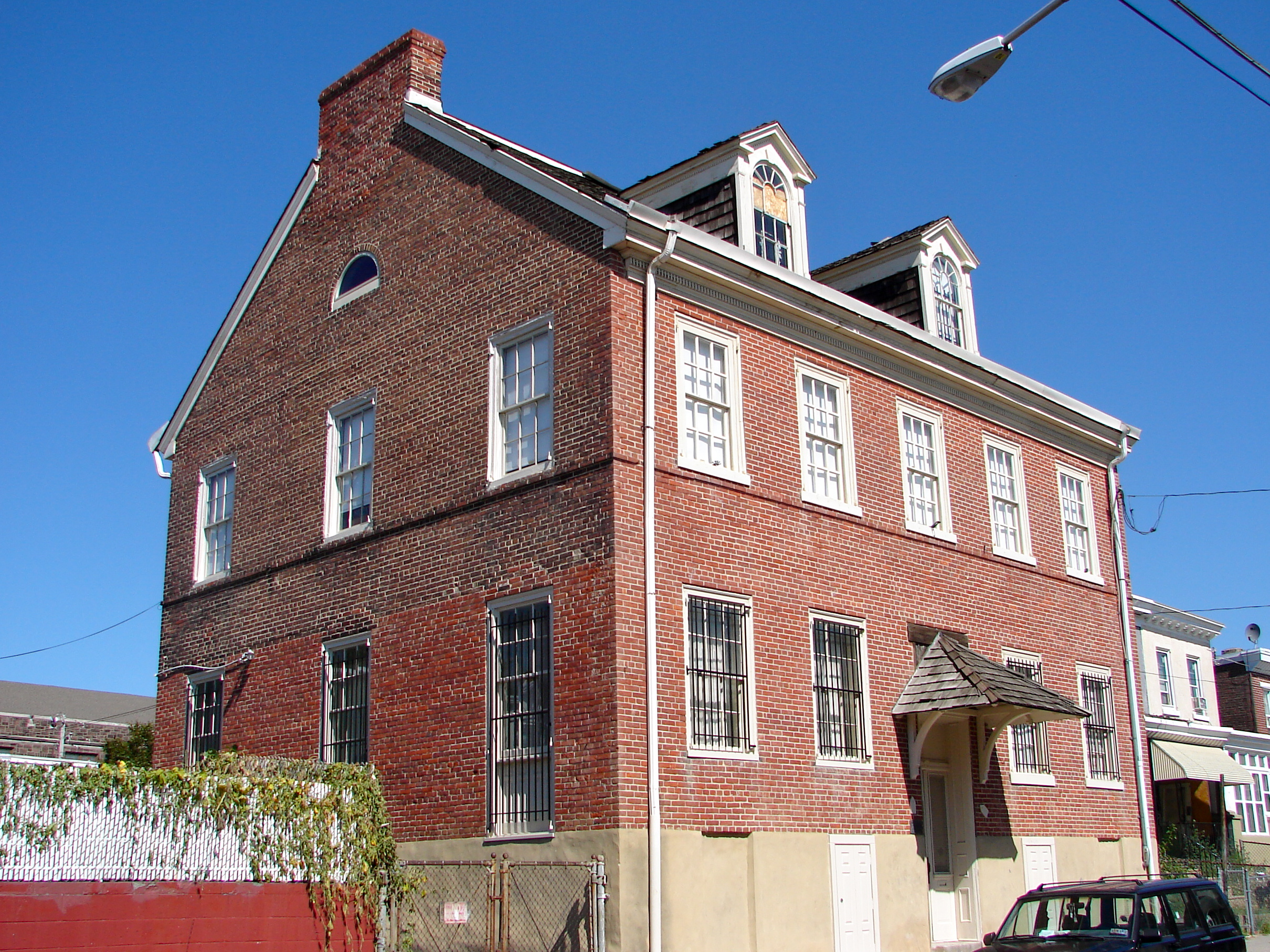
- John Ruan House, from the southwest

- Location within Philadelphia Location within Pennsylvania Location within the United States
- Location: 4278–4280 Griscom St., Philadelphia, Pennsylvania
- Coordinates: 40°0′36″N 75°5′28″W
- Built: 1796
- Architectural style: Georgian
- NRHP reference No.: 85003410

Significant dates
- Added to NRHP: October 31, 1985
- Designated PRHP: January 3, 1985

John Ruan House (1794) is a historic mansion located in the Frankford section of Philadelphia, Pennsylvania, United States. It housed the Grand Army of the Republic Civil War Museum and Library from 1958 to 2021.

The building was added to the National Register of Historic Places in 1985, and to the Philadelphia Register of Historic Places that same year.

== History ==
Dr. John Ruan erected a small residence in Frankford in 1794. After paying taxes on this, he built a Late Georgian mansion beside it in 1796, possibly converting the first house into the mansion's kitchen and servants' quarters. Ryan suffered financial losses in 1822, and the house was sold to a merchant. It changed ownership several times in the nineteenth century, before it was converted into a kindergarten in 1890.

The Knights of Columbus acquired the building in 1921, and used it for meetings and social events. It was acquired by the Philadelphia Camp Corporation in 1958, which converted it into the Grand Army of the Republic Civil War Museum and Library.

Due to rising maintenance costs, the museum relocated to 8110 Frankford Avenue in 2021, and the house was purchased by a private owner.

== Composition ==
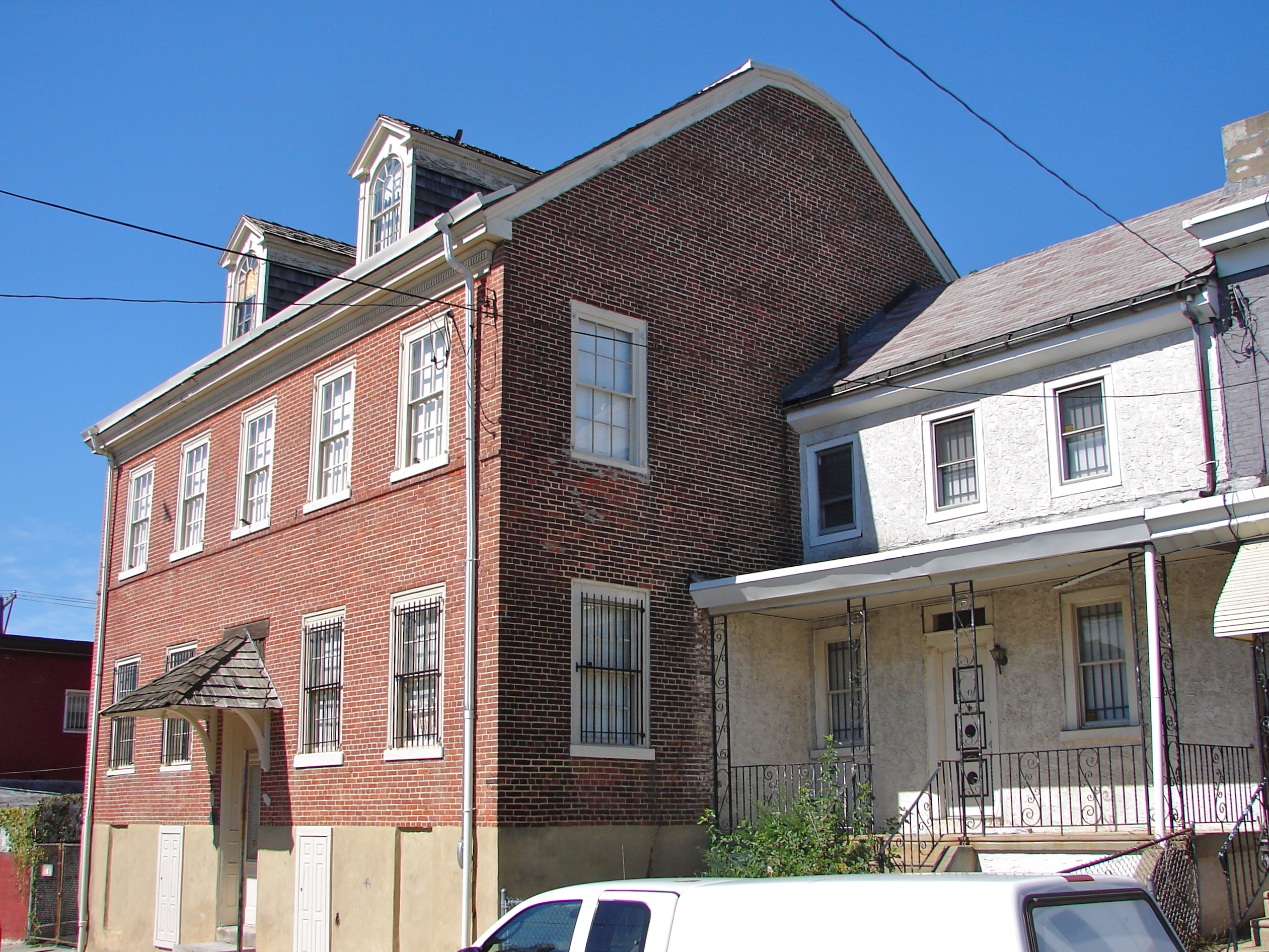
John Ruan House, from the southeast

The brick mansion is two-and-a-half-stories above a high basement, with a 5-bay symmetrical facade, semi-hipped roof, twin gathered chimneys with a semi-lune window on the third story of the west facade, and two ornate dormers. Unusual is its brick banding below the second story windows, which may have originally continued around all four walls. The house is the oldest of its size and stature surviving in Frankford. Some of its ornamentation is reminiscent of German-born architect Robert Wellford, however, the date of construction makes it unlikely that he had a part in designing it.
