= Comly Rich House =

Historic house in Philadelphia

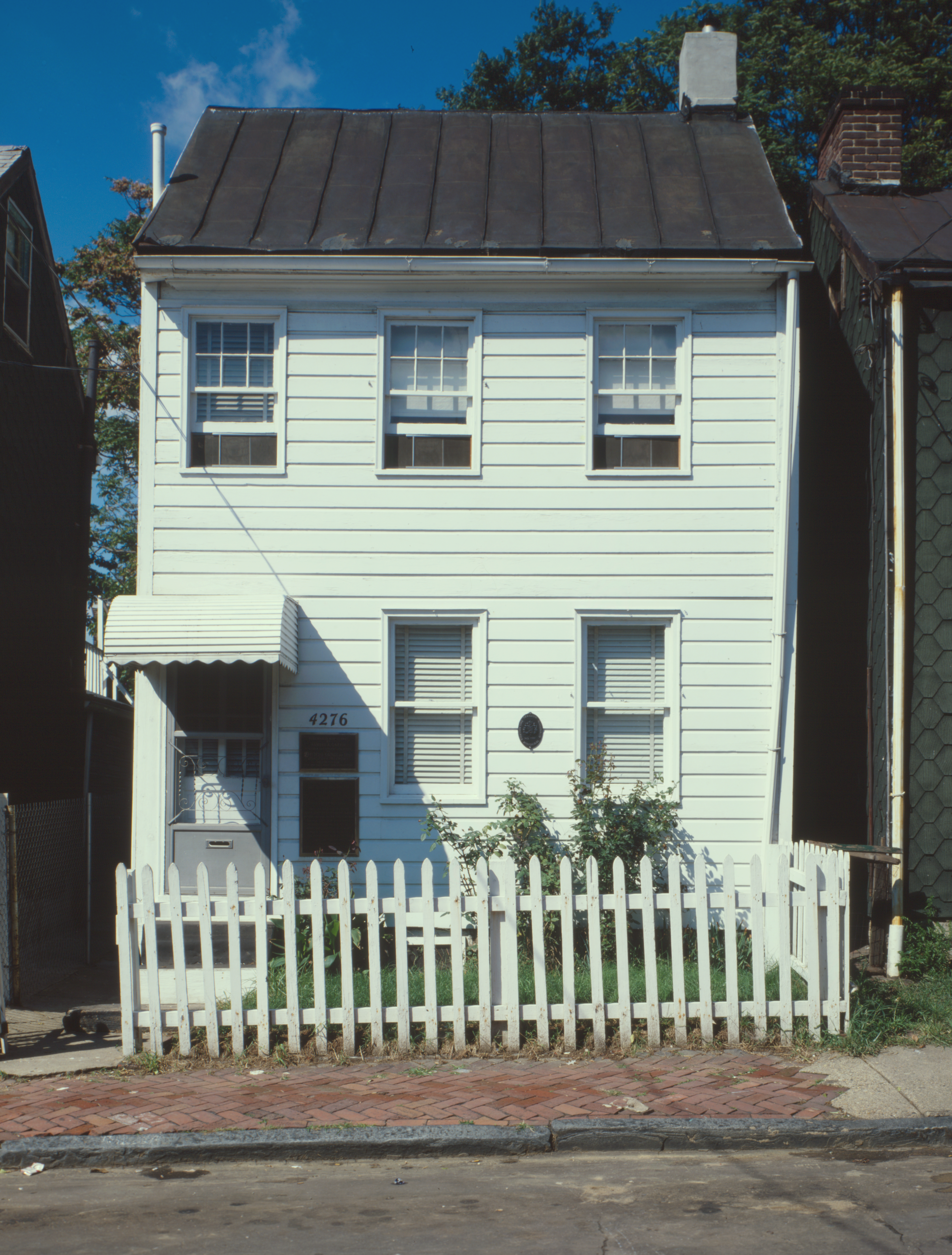
- The Comly Rich house photographed in the 20th century.
- Interactive map of the Comly Rich House area

General information
- Architectural style: Federal
- Location: 4276 Orchard Street; Frankford, Philadelphia, Pennsylvania
- Coordinates: 40.00956°N 75.08687°W
- Completed: 1826

Philadelphia Register of Historic Places
- Designated: March 29, 1960

The Comly Rich House is a historic house in the Frankford neighborhood of Philadelphia, Pennsylvania, notable as the first home in the United States financed by a savings and loan association, the Oxford Provident Building Society, founded 1831. To buy the house, which cost $500, Rich, variously described as a lamplighter or a maker of combs, received a loan of $375 in April 1831 from the Oxford Provident Building Association, founded the same year.

The two-and-a-half-story house, built around 1826, still stands at 4276 Orchard Street. It was listed on the Philadelphia Register of Historic Places in 1960.
