= Frankford Slasher =

Possible serial killer in Philadelphia, U.S.

- Born: Leonard Christopher (alleged killer) (circumstantial evidence)(convicted of one of the murders)
- Penalty: Life (Leonard Christopher)

Details
- Victims: 1-9
- Span of crimes: August 19, 1985 – September 6, 1990
- Country: United States
- State: Pennsylvania
- Date apprehended: May 5, 1990 (Leonard Christopher)

The Frankford Slasher is the name given by the media to a possible serial killer who operated in and around the neighborhood of Frankford in Philadelphia, Pennsylvania from 1985 to 1990. Leonard Christopher was convicted in the murder of one of the nine supposedly linked victims, but the others remain unsolved. All of the victims were sexually assaulted and stabbed to death. Several of the victims were seen with a middle-aged white man shortly before their murders.

== Possible victims ==
- Helen Patent, 51, killed August 19, 1985
- Anna Carroll, 67, killed January 3, 1986
- Suzanna Olszef, 64, killed December 25, 1986
- Jeanne Durkin, 28, killed January 8, 1987
- Catherine M. Jones, 29, killed January 1987 (connection to other murders is disputed)
- Margaret Vaughan, 66, killed November 11, 1988
- Theresa Sciortino, 30, killed January 19, 1989
- Carol Dowd, 44, killed April 29, 1990 (Leonard Christopher was convicted of her murder)
- Michelle Dehner, 30, killed September 6, 1990 (occurred while Leonard Christopher was in prison)

== Leonard Christopher ==
During the investigation into the death of Carol Dowd, Leonard Christopher, an employee at a nearby fish market, became a suspect. Despite the fact that he did not match the witness's description of Dowd being seen with a middle-aged white man before her death, and that there was no evidence to link him to any of the other eight murders, and only circumstantial evidence linking him to Dowd's murder, he was tried and convicted of one count of first degree murder on December 12, 1990, and sentenced to life in prison. He has since died of cancer, maintaining his innocence since the beginning.

Also noteworthy is the fact that a ninth victim, Michelle Dehner, was stabbed to death in the same fashion as the other women while Christopher was serving his life sentence in prison. However, Dehner's murder was ruled a "copycat killing" by detectives.

== See also ==
- Crime in Philadelphia

General:

- List of fugitives from justice who disappeared
- List of serial killers in the United States
