= Mike Jarmoluk =

American football player (1922–2004)

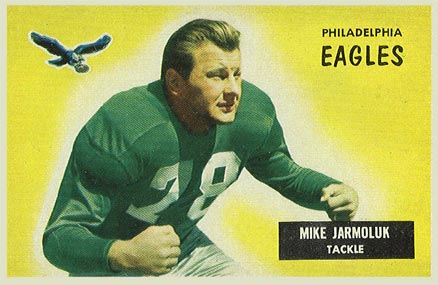
- Jarmoluk on a 1955 Bowman football card

No. 25, 47, 78
- Positions: Defensive tackle, tackle, guard

Personal information
- Born: October 22, 1922; Philadelphia, Pennsylvania, U.S.
- Died: November 23, 2004 (aged 82); Ocala, Florida, U.S.
- Listed height: 6 ft 5 in (1.96 m)
- Listed weight: 252 lb (114 kg)

Career information
- High school: Frankford (Philadelphia)
- College: Temple
- NFL draft: 1945: 7th round, 62nd overall pick

Career history
- Chicago Bears (1946–1947); Boston Yanks (1948); New York Bulldogs (1949); Philadelphia Eagles (1949–1955)

Awards and highlights
- 2× NFL champion (1946, 1949); Pro Bowl (1951)

Career NFL statistics
- Games played: 118
- Games started: 89
- Fumble recoveries: 16
- Interceptions: 7
- Stats at Pro Football Reference

Michael M. Jarmoluk Jr. (October 22, 1922 – November 23, 2004) was an American professional football player who was a defensive lineman in the National Football League (NFL) for the Chicago Bears, Boston Yanks, New York Bulldogs, and the Philadelphia Eagles. He played college football for the Temple Owls and was selected in the seventh round of the 1945 NFL draft by the Detroit Lions. He attended Frankford High School.

Jarmoluk went to one Pro Bowl during his ten-year NFL career.
