= Smedley Elementary School =

- Franklin Smedley School
- U.S. National Register of Historic Places
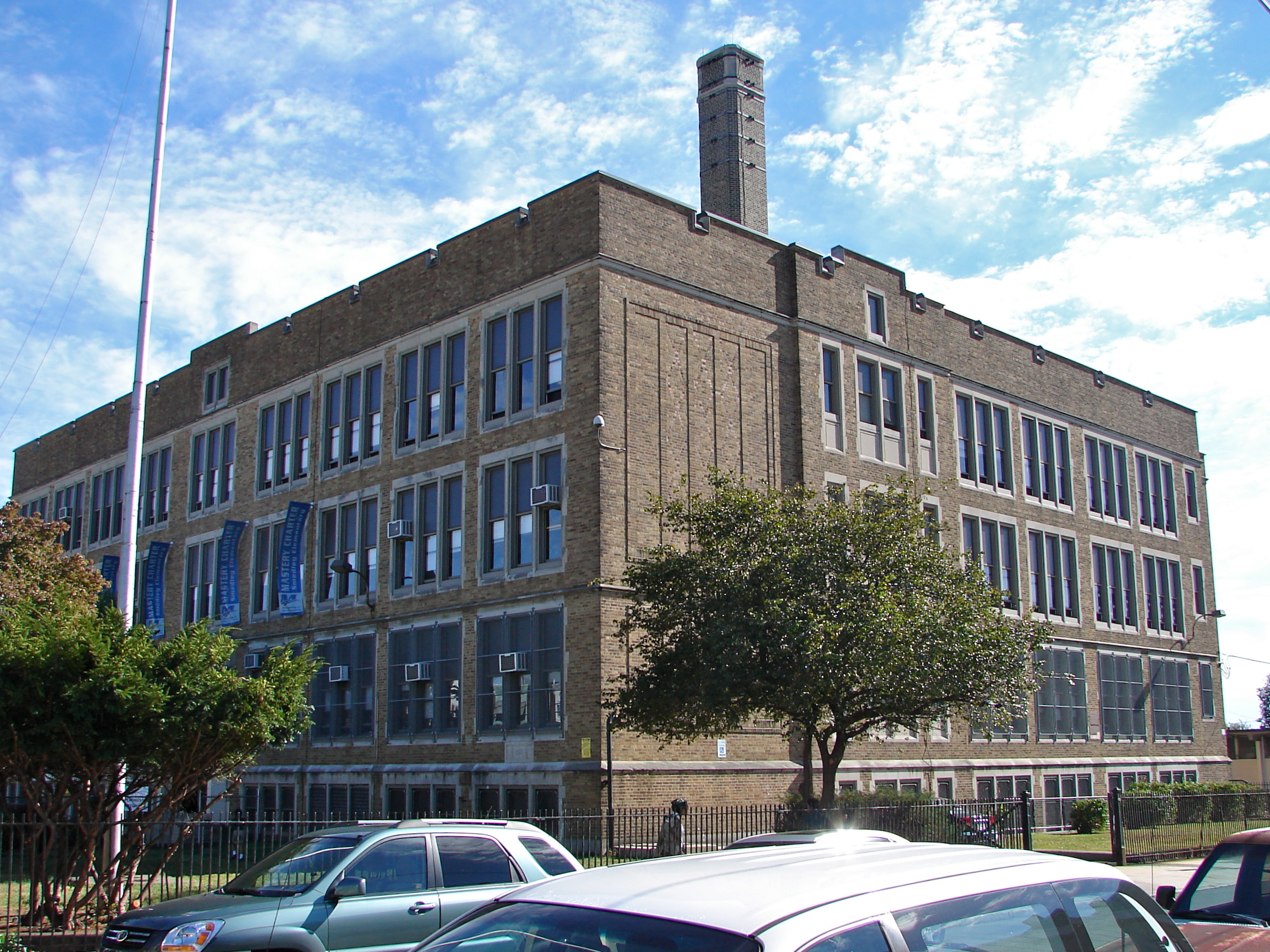
- Franklin Smedley School, September 2010

- Location within Philadelphia Location within Pennsylvania Location within the United States
- Location: 1790 Bridge St., Philadelphia, Pennsylvania
- Coordinates: 40°01′11″N 75°04′26″W
- Area: 1.7 acres (0.69 ha)
- Built: 1927–1928
- Architect: Irwin T. Catharine
- Architectural style: Late Gothic Revival
- MPS: Philadelphia Public Schools TR
- NRHP reference No.: 88002323
- Added to NRHP: November 18, 1988

The Mastery Charter School - Smedley Elementary is an American charter school that is located in the Frankford neighborhood of Philadelphia, Pennsylvania.

The building was added to the National Register of Historic Places in 1988.

== History and notable features ==
Originally named the Franklin Smedley School, the school has been run by Mastery Charter Schools since 2010.

The building was designed by Irwin T. Catharine and was built between 1927 and 1928. It is a three-story, nine-bay, yellow brick building that sits on a raised basement. Created in the Late Gothic Revival style, it features a projecting stone entryway with Tudor-arched opening, stone openings, and a crenellated parapet.
