= Northwood, Philadelphia =

Coordinates: 40°01′27″N 75°05′10″W

Northwood, an area of the Frankford section of Philadelphia, is bounded on the north by Roosevelt Boulevard, on the northeast by Cheltenham Avenue, on the west by Oakland Cemetery and Greenwood Cemetery, Juniata Park and Frankford Creek, and on the southeast by Frankford Avenue. To the northeast are Oxford Circle and Mayfair and to the southeast is Frankford.

The Henry R. Edmunds School and Friends Hospital are listed on the National Register of Historic Places.
