= Frankford Special Services District of Philadelphia =

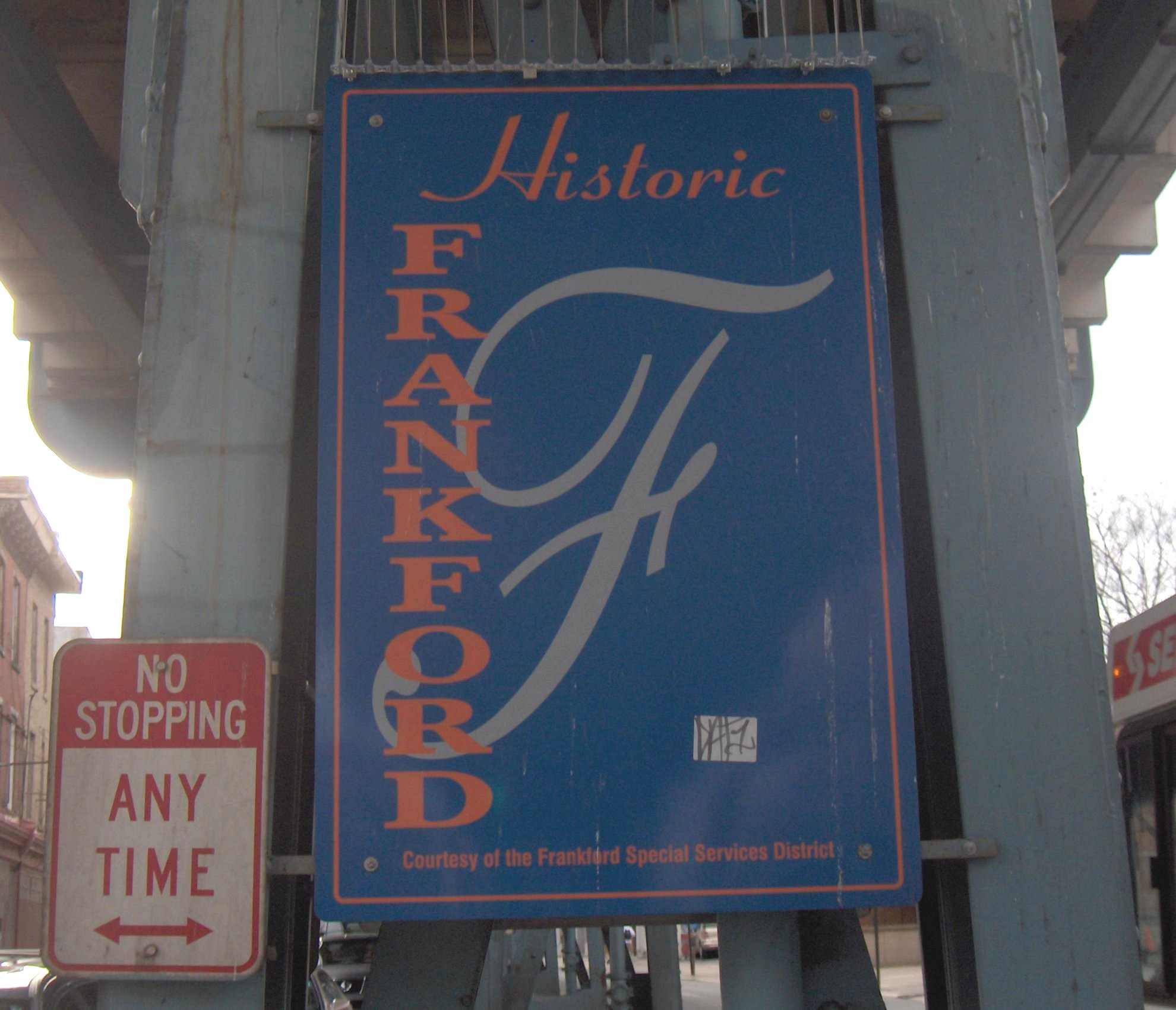
- Frankford SSD sign on a Market-Frankford subway/elevated line support, December, 2009.

Agency overview
- Formed: December 6, 2007
- Type: Municipal authority (Pennsylvania), a Business Improvement District
- Jurisdiction: Both sides of Frankford Avenue from Torresdale Avenue to Bridge Street and certain side streets including portions of Kensington Avenue, Foulkrod Street, Gillingham Street, Griscom Street, Margaret Street, Meadow Street, Orthodox Street, Paul Street, Pratt Street, Darrah Street, and Unity Street, in Philadelphia, PA 19124
- Employees: 12
- Agency executive: Tim Wisniewski, Jonathan Carson, Executive Director, Operations Manager
- Website: http://www.frankfordssd.org/

Footnotes
- Defunct 1 January 2012

Frankford Special Services District of Philadelphia was a municipal authority providing business improvement district services in the Frankford neighborhood of Northeast Philadelphia. It is defunct as of 1 January 2012, per the enabling ordinance.

== Services ==
=== Sidewalk cleaning ===
The Frankford Special Services District has a supplementary program of sidewalk cleaning using private contractors with uniformed crews to sweep the sidewalks five times per week. The Philadelphia Streets Department will continue to clean the cart-ways from curb line to curb line and empty public trash receptacles.

=== Security ===
The 15th Philadelphia Police District, the SEPTA Transit Police, and the Frankford Special Services District will improve safety and security in the district by improving communication between the two police departments and the community. The District is also seeking additional funding to enable the reinstatement of the Safety Ambassadors Program, which has representatives on the street to assist the public and to report any problems to the police.

=== Marketing ===
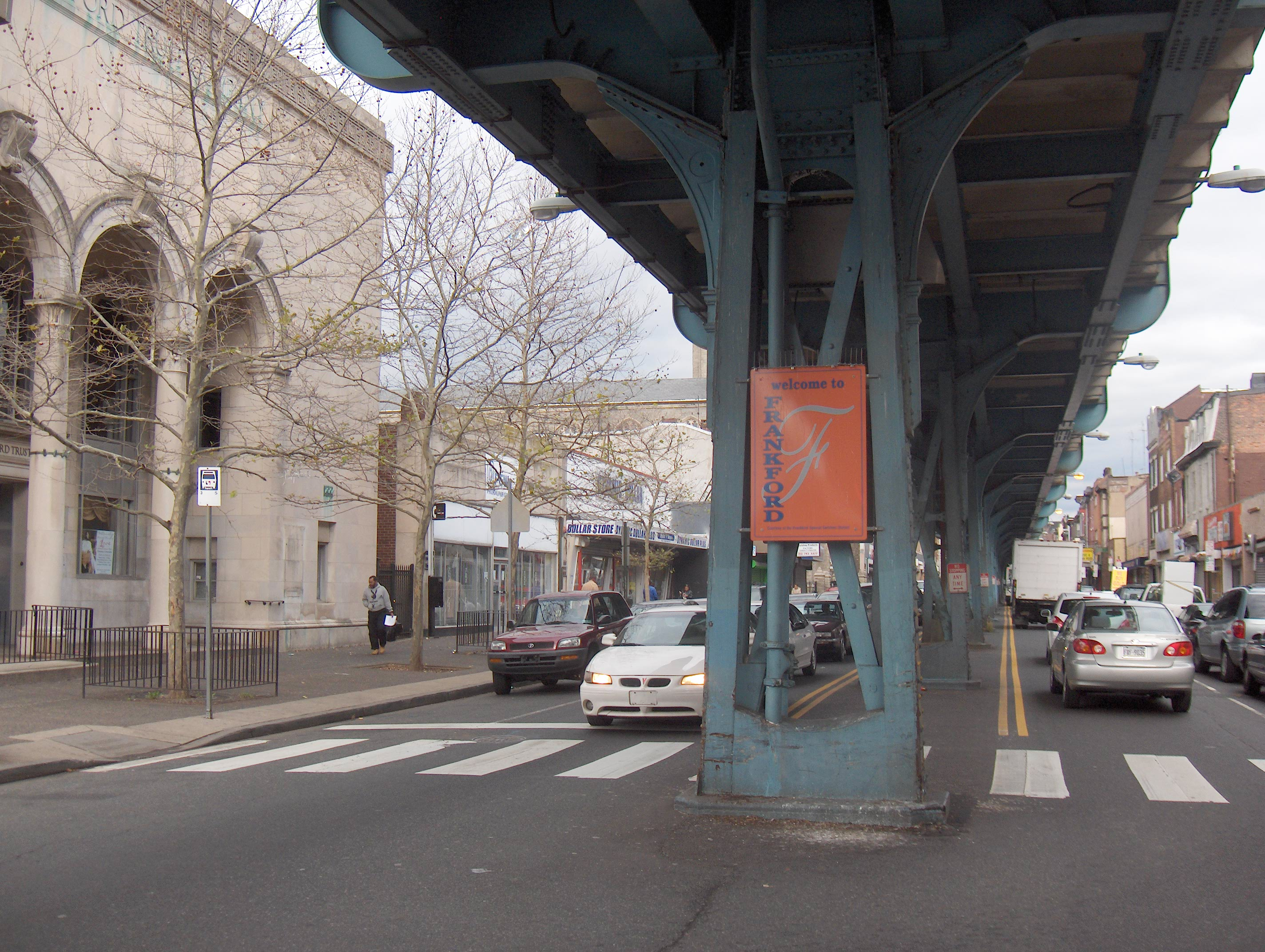
Sign posted by the Frankford SSD on a Market-Frankford subway/elevated line support in December 2009

To encourage and increase the commercial, retail, and cultural activities in the District, the Frankford Special Services District will support marketing and promotional initiatives to enhance the public image of Frankford. The official website is part of those initiatives.

== Administration ==
The Frankford Special Services District Authority has a nine-member Board of Directors representing Frankford's major property owners and occupants, and leaders of business, cultural, education, labor union, and health care institutions. A part-time staff manager, who reports directly to the Board of Directors, oversees the private contractor services.

== Funding ==
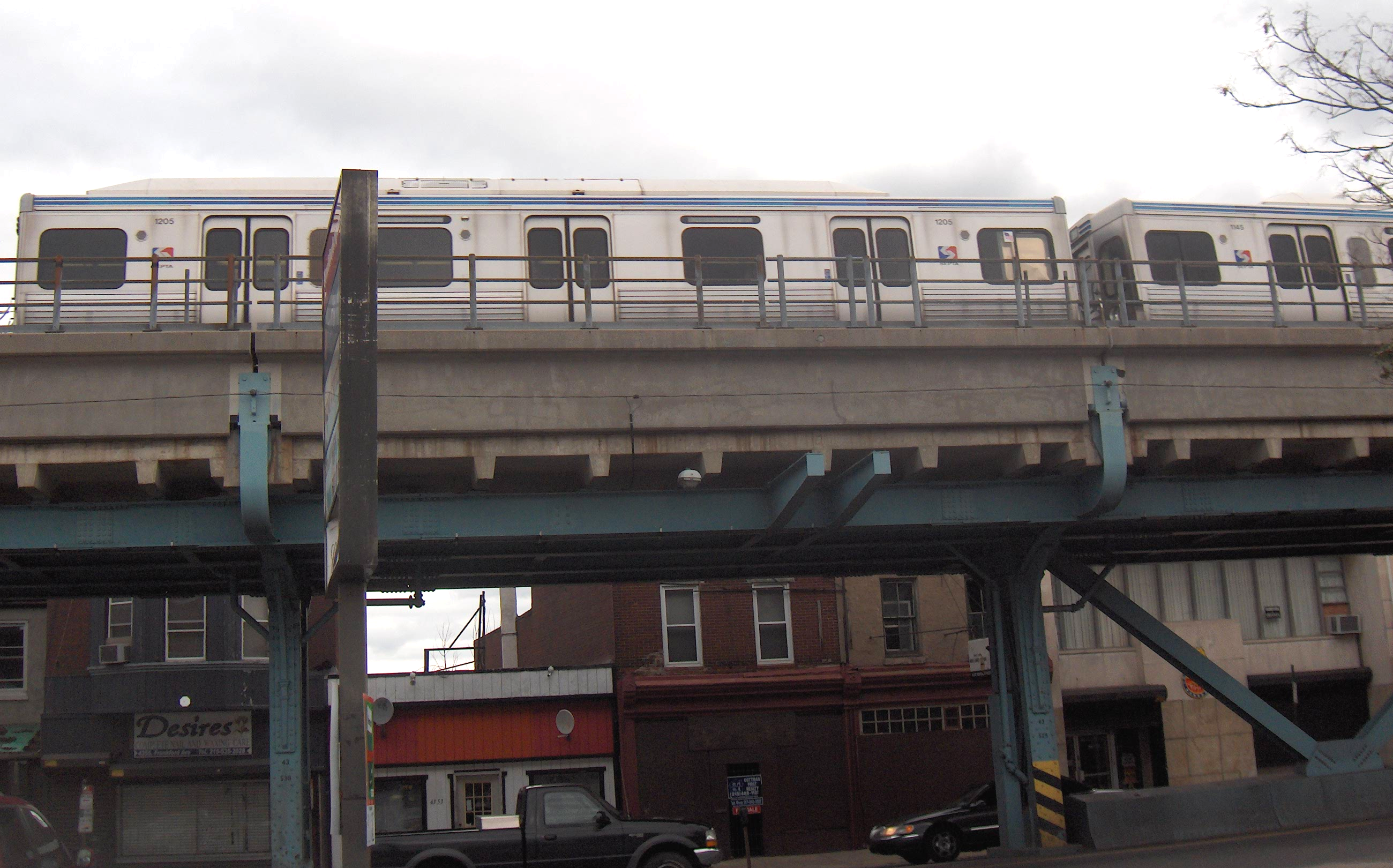
Market-Frankford subway/elevated line with passing train, Frankford Avenue at Unity Street, December, 2009

The Frankford Special Services District expects and intends to fund the additional services through an annual assessment of all taxable properties within the district, billed annually. There are a number of tax-exempt properties in the District. While the District will solicit these organizations for contributions, those contributions will not be assumed or included in any budget.
