= John Marshall School =

- U.S. National Register of Historic Places
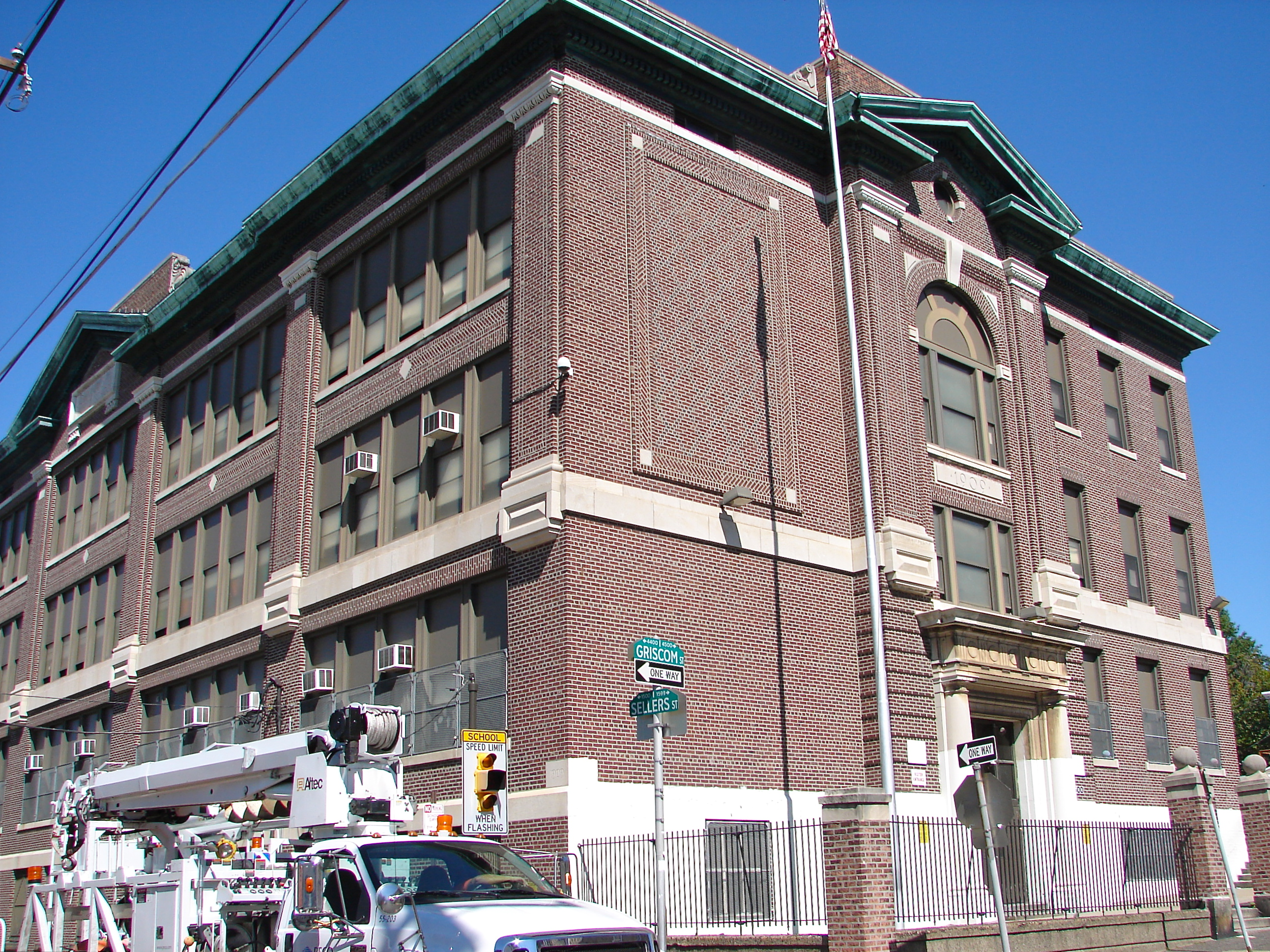
- John Marshall School, September 2010

- Location within Philadelphia Location within Pennsylvania Location within the United States
- Location: 1501 Sellers St., Philadelphia, Pennsylvania
- Coordinates: 40°00′53″N 75°05′15″W
- Area: 1.1 acres (0.45 ha)
- Built: 1909–1910
- Built by: David Peoples
- Architect: Henry deCourcy Richards
- Architectural style: Colonial Revival
- MPS: Philadelphia Public Schools TR
- NRHP reference No.: 88002298
- Added to NRHP: November 18, 1988

The John Marshall Elementary School is a historic elementary school that is located in the Frankford neighborhood of Philadelphia, Pennsylvania. It is part of the School District of Philadelphia.

The building was added to the National Register of Historic Places in 1988.

== History and architectural features ==
Designed by Henry deCourcy Richards, this historic structure was built between 1909 and 1910, and is a three-story, five-bay by three-bay, brick building that sits on a raised basement. Designed in the Colonial Revival style, it has a three-story, rear brick addition that was built in 1922. It features a pedimented cornice, brick parapet, projecting central section, and a two-story arched opening above the main entrance. The school was named for Chief Justice John Marshall.
