= John Diehl (American football) =

American football player (1936–2012)

No. 78, 73
- Position: Defensive tackle

Personal information
- Born: January 27, 1936; Philadelphia, Pennsylvania, U.S.
- Died: December 28, 2012 (aged 76); Williamsburg, Virginia, U.S.
- Listed height: 6 ft 7 in (2.01 m)
- Listed weight: 265 lb (120 kg)

Career information
- High school: Frankford (PA)
- College: Virginia
- NFL draft: 1958: 7th round, 82nd overall pick

Career history

Playing
- Baltimore Colts (1961–1964); Oakland Raiders (1965); Harrisburg Capitols (1967-1969)

Coaching
- Harrisburg Capitols (1967, 1969) Assistant

Career NFL/AFL statistics
- Fumble recoveries: 4
- Sacks: 2
- Stats at Pro Football Reference

John Albright Diehl (January 27, 1936 – December 28, 2012) was an American professional football defensive tackle in the National Football League (NFL) for the Baltimore Colts and Dallas Cowboys. He also was a member of the Oakland Raiders in the American Football League (AFL). He played college football at the University of Virginia.

== Early life ==
Diehl attended Frankford High School. After graduation he enrolled at Bullis School for a year. He accepted a football scholarship from the University of Virginia. He struggled during his college career, being injured as a sophomore and was out of school for scholastic reasons as a junior. He started at defensive tackle as a senior.

== Professional career ==
Diehl was selected by the Baltimore Colts in the seventh round (82nd overall) of the 1958 NFL draft with a future draft pick, which allowed the team to draft him before his college eligibility was over. His rookie season came until 1961, where he made his professional debut at defensive tackle in the twelfth game against the San Francisco 49ers, replacing an injured Joe Lewis. He was a backup at right defensive tackle behind Billy Ray Smith Sr. and Fred Miller. He was released on September 14, 1965.

On September 15, 1965, he was claimed off waivers by the Dallas Cowboys. He was released on September 24, to make room to activate Pete Gent from the taxi squad.

In 1965, he was signed by the Oakland Raiders of the American Football League. In 1966, he was lost for the year with an injury.

== Personal life ==
Diehl was a player-coach for the Harrisburg Colts in the semi-professional Atlantic Coast Football League. After football, he owned and operated various moving businesses in Virginia.
