= Frankford Friends School =

Coordinates: 40.015332°N 75.087228°W

Frankford Friends School (FFS) is an elementary school in Philadelphia, US. It is an independent, coeducational Quaker day-school for students in grades pre-kindergarten through eight. It is located at 1500 Orthodox Street, in the historic Frankford section of Philadelphia, Pennsylvania.

FFS students are ages 4 through 14; of the 163 students, 53% are white and 23% are Native American. Because of FFS's commitment to socio-economic diversity, the Board sets a tuition fee that is the lowest of any Quaker school in the Philadelphia metropolitan area.

FFS learning is grounded in the study of the UN Sustainable Development Goals. It has classes in Spanish, art, physical education, and music.

== Programs ==
=== Early childhood program ===
Pre-kindergarten and kindergarten students learn through review skills and concepts in math, literacy, handwriting, social studies, and science in one-to-one (teacher/student) or small groups.

=== Lower school program ===
The Lower School curriculum encourages students in grades 1 through 5 to take greater ownership of their learning. Through purposeful instruction, they build strong skills in reading, writing, and math while learning to think critically, collaborate effectively, and communicate clearly. Thoughtfully designed interdisciplinary projects help them make connections across subjects and relate their learning to the world around them.

As students advance through the grades, their academic work becomes more intentional and focused. They learn to plan, share, reflect, and revise their ideas. Along the way, they discover that effort, clear goals, feedback, and curiosity drive growth—and that their thinking can inspire meaningful change in their lives, classrooms, and communities.

=== Middle school program ===
The curriculum provides a variety of musical and visual arts electives, STEM classes, and foreign language studies. The middle school at FFS usually has around 50 students spread across 3 grades. FFS middle school sports include cross country running, basketball, and volleyball. In middle school at FFS students are offered a choice between 4-5 classes, called Connections. Connections replaced the previous “explorations” program with a more community oriented approach, with students helping parts of the community.

== History ==
The earliest direct predecessor of FFS was the one-room “Spring House School,” built by Oxford Meeting in 1768 at the corner of Wain and Spring Streets. It was attended by both Quaker and non-Quaker children.

=== Campus transformation ===
FFS was established on its present site in 1833 when Frankford Monthly Meeting members purchased a large parcel of land spanning from what is now Orthodox Street to Leiper Avenue, for the sum of $1,777.07. A new Meetinghouse was built, with 20 Quaker students learning on the second floor. The school's budget was $75, with $28.27 of that going towards scholarships.

In 1868, the meeting house was enlarged and the second story removed. Additional classrooms were built above the horse sheds on the property. Sometime during the late 1880s or early 1890s, a new brick schoolhouse was built. In 1924, a social room was added to the rear of the meeting house, and a few years later, the porch was enclosed for the use of the kindergarten.

In the early years of the twenty-first century, grades seven and eight were added to the school, and the first eighth grade class graduated in 2004. In 2012, the Margaret Passmore Trickey building was built to house the Middle School program.

Eventually, a free-standing, one-room schoolhouse was constructed in 1890 to accommodate the growing numbers of students in the post-Civil War Era. New additions were added over the next 40 years.

Under the guidance of Principal Terry Farley (1969–2004), FFS implemented new programs in the arts and music. Mr. Farley conducted the choirs and handbell ensemble, and holiday performances at Strawbridge and Clothiers. The school's first Apple computer lab was also installed during that time.

Beginning in 2012, the construction of the Margaret Passmore Trickey building allowed 7th and 8th graders to learn along with the other students on campus.

In 2014, two properties were gifted to FFS, including a three-story parsonage, and a .4-acre vacant lot across the street from the school. Construction began on a half-acre green space on campus.

In 2016, FFS began a strategic effort to plan for future program needs. Over the next six years, the school purchased and/or renovated all of the School's spaces, including the Meetinghouse, the Farley Building, the IDEA Lab, and the new middle school and gym.

In 2021, FFS and Frankford Monthly Meeting were separately incorporated. The two entities continue to exist.

=== School leadership ===
- Frankford Monthly Meeting of the Society of Friends: 1833–1928
- Reba Lammey, Principal: 1928–1969
- Terrence Farley, Principal: 1969–2004
- Penny Colgan Davis, Principal: 2004–2014
- Kathryn Park Cook, Head of School: 2015–present

=== Campus ===
In 2023, FFS began planning for a satellite campus to house a new preschool in the Fishtown/Kensington Area of Philadelphia, to open in early winter 2024. The program will serve children from 2 years, 7 months to 5 years old.
