= Fisher's Lane Bridge =

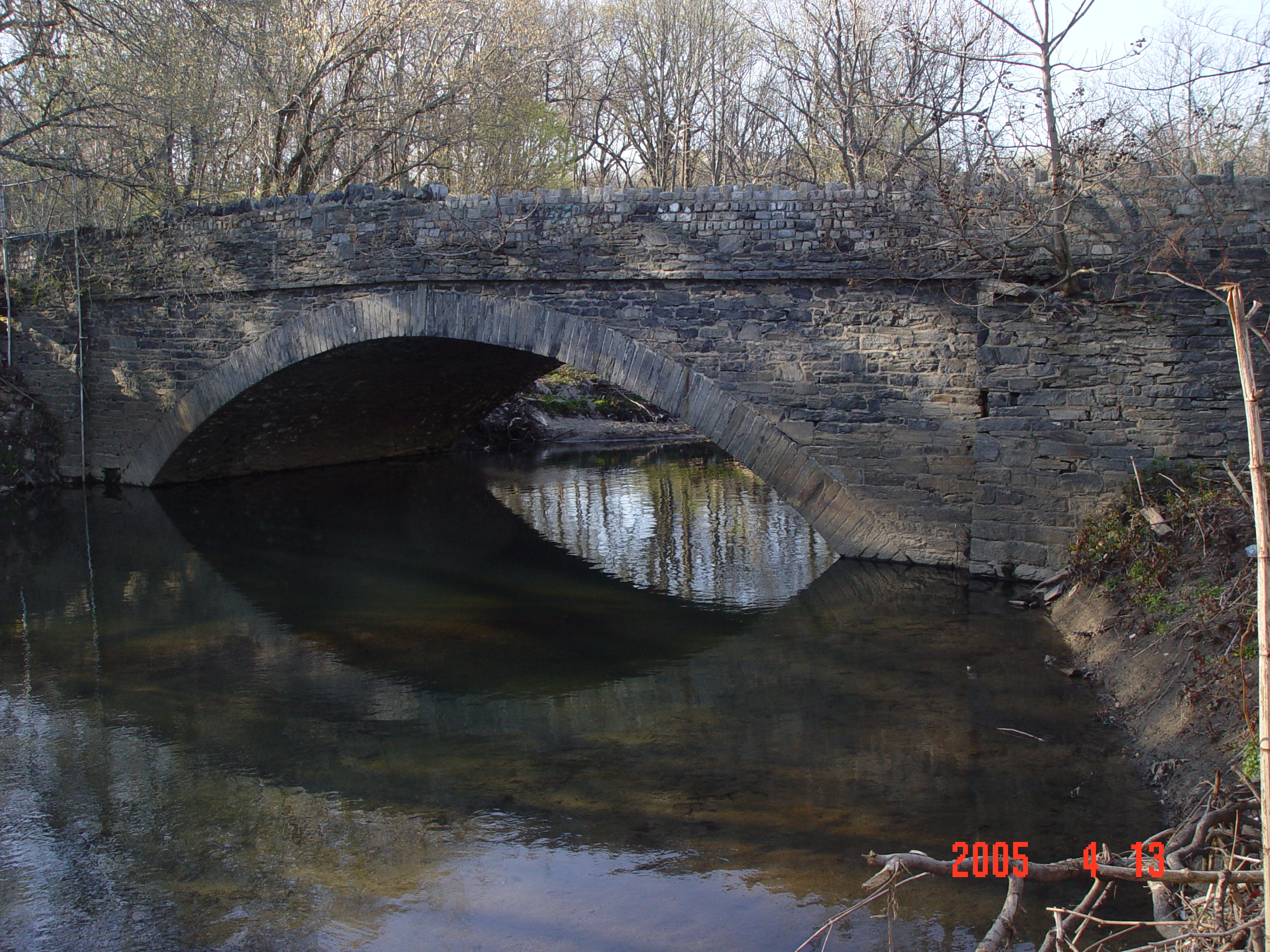
- Fisher's Lane Stone Arch Bridge over Tacony Creek above Frankford, Philadelphia County, Pennsylvania
- Coordinates: 40.02085°N 75.10339°W
- Carries: 2 lanes of Fisher's Lane
- Crosses: Tacony Creek
- Locale: Philadelphia, Pennsylvania

Characteristics
- Design: stone arch
- Longest span: 54.1 feet (16.5 m)

History
- Opened: as a floating bridge before 1759

Statistics
- Toll: none

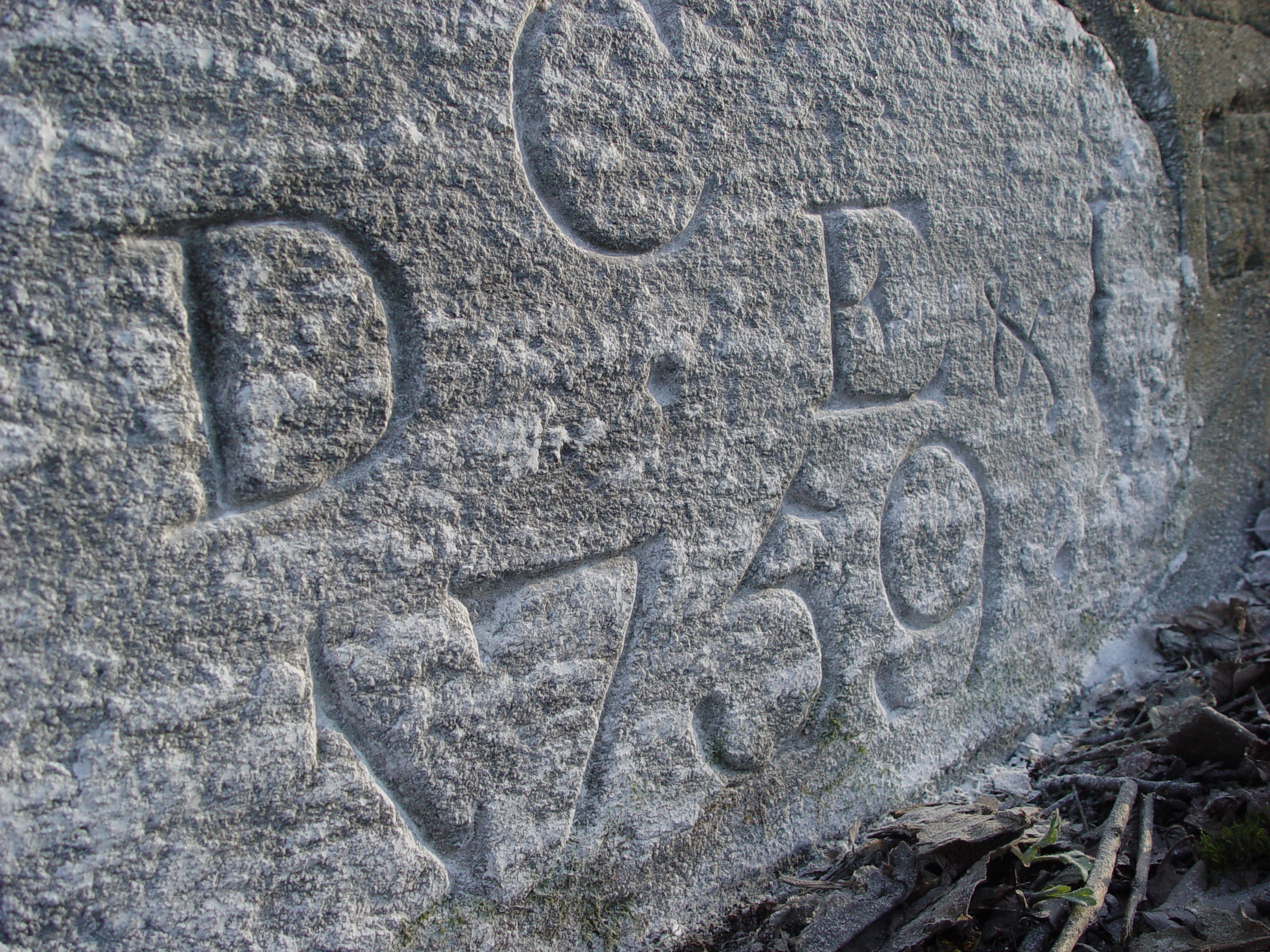
Fisher's Lane Stone Arch Bridge - 1759 Corner Stone

Fisher's Lane Bridge is a historic stone arch bridge that carries Fisher's Lane west of Ramona Avenue across Tacony Creek in Tacony Creek Park in Philadelphia, Pennsylvania.

The filled-spandrel stone arch bridge has a single span of 54 feet (16 m) and is 27.7 feet (8.4 m) wide. It is currently open to traffic.

Though claimed by some to have been re-built in 1796, a still-legible cornerstone in the bridge masonry shows the year 1759.
