= Frankford Powder-Mill =

Historic factory in Philadelphia

Coordinates: 40.015°N 75.095°W

The Frankford Powder-Mill was a gunpowder factory in the Frankford neighborhood of Philadelphia, Pennsylvania.

At the time it was built in 1774 by Oswald Eve, it was the only such mill in the American colonies. Other powder mills operated in the 17th and 18th centuries but stopped production after the French and Indian war. Eve built his mill next to Frankford Creek, from which it drew its power.

== Revolution ==
When in the following year King George III banned shipments of gunpowder to the colonies, Eve was left with a monopoly on the commodity. The mill was the first American powder mill to supply the American Revolutionary War. In November 1775 Paul Revere visited the mill to observe Eve's production methods.

Before and during the early American Revolution, the mill was operated by Eve, then by his son Oswald Eve, Jr. On January 11, 1776, the Continental Congress contracted the elder Eve to manufacture gunpowder for the Colonies at $8.00 per hundredweight.

In the meantime, to secure gunpowder for its war efforts, Congress approved on February 16, 1776, a committee led by Clement Biddle and Captain Joseph Cowperthwaite to build the Continental Powder Mill. The Continental Mill was built on French Creek, four miles from Phoenixville, and eight miles from Valley Forge. With the uncertainty of Eve's alliances, eight additional mills, operated by private businessmen, were contracted by the Committee of Safety or the Continental Congress, to supplement the Continental Powder Mill and Frankford Mills. These mills had trouble securing raw materials, and the Continental Mill was destroyed by accidental explosion on March 10, 1777.

The Frankford Mill continued production. By April 1777, Eve had delivered 25,000 pounds of powder to the state.

== British capture ==
The British seized the mill in September 1777 when they entered Philadelphia.

In 1778, the elder Eve was accused of clandestine dealings with the British and was convicted of treason by the Supreme Executive Council of the Commonwealth of Pennsylvania, who confiscated all his property, including the mill. It later passed into the hands of John Decatur, father of Revolutionary War naval hero Stephen Decatur, Sr., then in 1806 to local war hero General Isaac Worrell.

== Technology ==
Sulfur, charcoal, and saltpeter was sifted and granulated. The raw ingredients required processing to obtain the necessary purity. A water-powered stamping mill helped bland the powder into rounded particles, which were then dried in a dry house. Charles Willson Peale recorded details of the mill.
