= Enoch Edwards (surgeon) =

American physician and Patriot during the American Revolution

Enoch Edwards (1751 – April 18, 1802) was an American physician and a leading Patriot during the American Revolution. Born in Byberry Township, Pennsylvania, Edwards was a member of the Provincial Congress in Carpenters' Hall on June 18, 1776, which led to the Pennsylvania Constitution of 1776. He was also a signatory of the 1790 Pennsylvania Constitution. During the war he served as attending physician for George Washington, was a close friend of both Benjamin Rush and Thomas Jefferson, and kept up correspondence with James Monroe and John Quincy Adams.

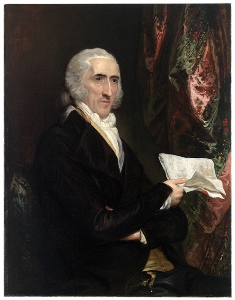
Dr. Enoch Edwards by Benjamin West. 1795

On October 26, 1779, Edwards married Frances Gordon (half-sister of Henry Benbridge) at Christ Church, Philadelphia. He was elected to the American Philosophical Society in 1787.

The Edwards family were prominent during the American Revolution.

Dr. Enoch Edwards was associated with James Monroe when the latter was minister to France, and was also on the staff of Lord Sterling. He died in Frankford, Philadelphia, Pennsylvania.

A brother, Major Evan Edwards, was on the staff of General Charles Lee, and was General Lee's second in his celebrated duel with Laurens, in which Alexander Hamilton was the second on the other side.

It is said that Jefferson made his first draft of the Declaration of Independence in the summer house located in the garden of Dr. Edwards, in Frankford.

The mansion on these grounds, which was only recently torn down, was in its day the resort of the most eminent men of the time, including George Washington, Thomas Jefferson, Monroe, and many others foremost in the history of our country.

Aaron Burr, who was a cousin of Dr. Edwards, and of Dr. Britton's great-grandmother, was also a frequent visitor.

As a living eyewitness to Jefferson's return to Frankford, Fanny Saltar makes the following entry while writing her memoirs:

After my uncle's return, he purchased a place in Frankford of Mr. Drinker. The house was pleasantly situated at some distance from the street, but the beauty of the place consisted in the lovely view presented from the summer-house, of the pastures, streams, bridges, mills, the village, numberless roads winding through tall trees, luxuriant shade, and rising above all other objects, was seen Christ Church steeple, five miles distant.

One day when Mr. Jefferson was on a visit to my uncle, they walked up to this summer-house. He looked round and said: This is the spot on which the signers of the Declaration of Independence dined the day they signed the Declaration.
