= Frankford Arsenal =

- U.S. National Register of Historic Places
- U.S. Historic district
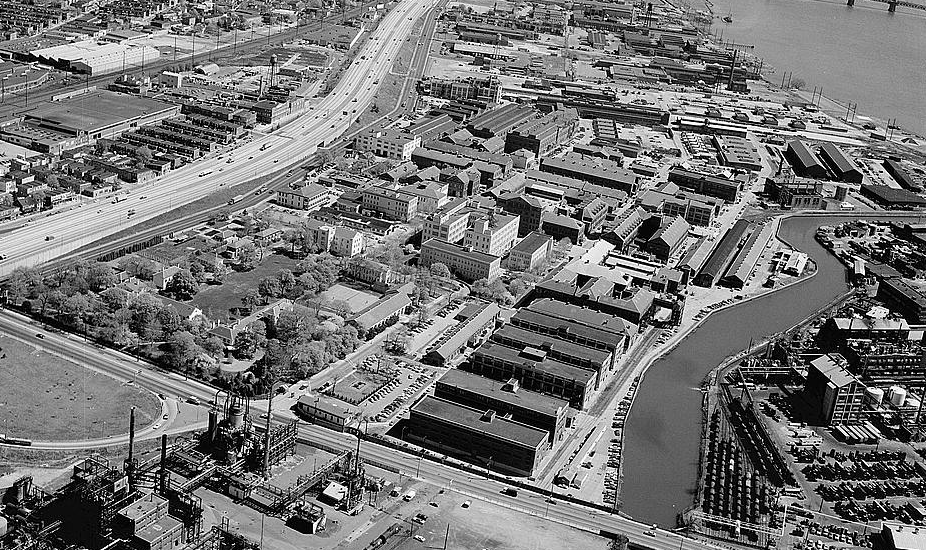
- Aerial view to the northeast (1978)
- Location: Tacony and Bridge Streets, Philadelphia, Pennsylvania, U.S.
- Coordinates: 40°00′28″N 75°04′05″W
- Area: 99.4 acres (40.2 ha)
- Built: 1816
- NRHP reference No.: 72001153; 100001935 (decrease)

Significant dates
- Added to NRHP: March 16, 1972
- Boundary decrease: December 28, 2017

The Frankford Arsenal is a former United States Army ammunition plant located adjacent to the Bridesburg neighborhood of Northeast Philadelphia, Pennsylvania, north of the original course of Frankford Creek.

== History ==
Opened in 1816 on 20 acres (8.1 ha) of land purchased by President James Madison, it was the center of U.S. military small-arms ammunition design and development until its closure in 1977. Among the many other products manufactured at the arsenal were fire-control and range-finding instruments, and gauges for these components.

With the outbreak of the Civil War, the arsenal's commander, Josiah Gorgas, resigned and joined the Confederate States Army in deference to the wishes of his Alabama-born wife and reported to the Confederate capital in Richmond with a large supply of U.S. Army guns and ammunition. By the end of the war, the arsenal employed over 1,000 workers. It served as a major site for the storage of weapons and artillery pieces; a depot for the repair of artillery, cavalry and infantry equipment; repair and cleaning of small arms and harnesses; the manufacture of percussion powder and Minié balls; and the testing of new forms of gunpowder and time fuses. During the Gettysburg campaign, the arsenal provided tens of thousands of muskets and vast supplies of ammunition for Pennsylvania's "Emergency Militia" regiments. Among the innovations extensively tested at the Arsenal was the Gatling Gun, an early form of machine gun that saw extensive service in the Indian Wars.

During World War I and World War II, the arsenal was again busy supplying the war efforts, providing a major source of jobs and income for the region. At times, employment reached 22,000.

The Frankford Arsenal was an entity unto itself, a virtual city within a city, and contained everything from its own police and fire departments, dining halls, motor pool, and a complete medical facility. The Arsenal was part of the U.S. Arsenal System—dedicated military establishments spread throughout the country to perform specific military missions for the Government.

From the beginning, the Frankford Arsenal was involved in the design and manufacture of munitions. As military weapons became more complex, the center's role expanded to cover the development of a whole range of the Army's more advanced weapon systems. The Arsenal contained the world-famous Pitman-Dunn Laboratories along with a number of other R&D departments. Arsenal scientists and engineers designed and developed everything from basic materials to LASER-guided ballistics, all produced entirely in-house from the concept phase to the fielding of the equipment. New portable and embedded computer applications saw the development of the LASER rangefinder, fielded artillery computational machines (FADAC) and radar systems. During the Vietnam War, experiments in caseless ammunition, far-infrared low-light-level technologies, and advanced LASER applications were under development.

The labs were supported by a full range of first-class drafting and machine shops scattered throughout the many buildings of the center. Everything from milling to electroplating, to multi-layer printed circuit board fabrication could be accomplished by "The Shops". The Optical Lens Design Facility was one of the finest in the country. The Optical Assembly shop also refurbished field binoculars. The Fire Control department literally wrote the glass and optics standards used throughout the United States.

Once a newly designed system was manufactured, complete structural and environmental testing was necessary to insure that the device could withstand the rigors of a fielded environment. This was accomplished in Arsenal's environmental testing and evaluation facility.

As the U.S. military–industrial complex grew, the Arsenal could no longer compete as a manufacturing entity. More and more of its programs were farmed out to industry. The Arsenal's functions were eventually transferred to the Picatinny Arsenal in New Jersey. The Fire Control and Ammunition Engineers were transferred to Picatinny Arsenal until they were retired.

During the presidential campaign of 1976, vice presidential candidate Walter Mondale stood in front of the Frankford Arsenal and promised that it would remain open. The Carter/Mondale ticket won the election but the promise was not fulfilled; the arsenal closed for U.S. government use in 1977.

Before closing, many custom designs were developed and tested, including the use of aluminum and steel for the manufacture of cartridge cases.

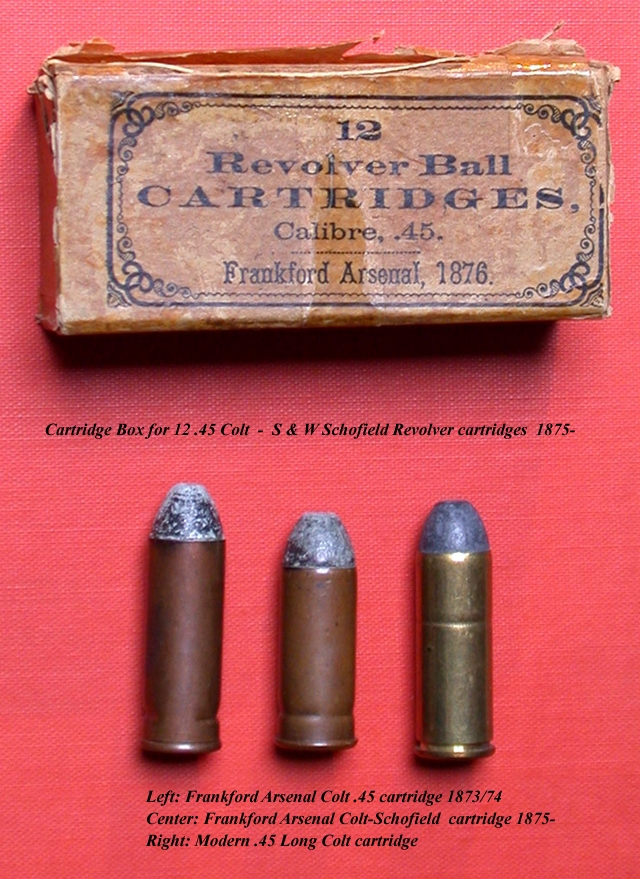
Frankford Arsenal made .45 Colt cartridges

The northernmost part of the site was assumed by the Pennsylvania Fish and Boat Commission for use as a boat ramp and fishing spot on the Delaware River. In August 2018, six buildings on the southernmost part of the property were purchased by Alliance Partners HSP for use as a light-industrial and office park.

== Munition markings ==
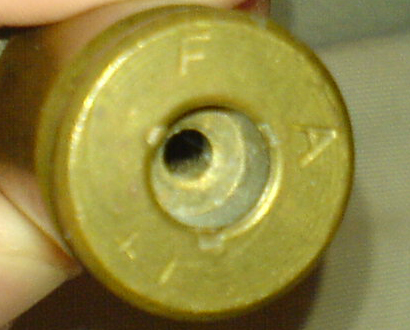
A .50 caliber cartridge case with the Frankford Arsenal headstamp

Each round of ammunition was marked with the headstamp "F A" on its base, denoting that it was produced at the Frankford Arsenal.

Early metallic cartridges produced at Frankford were not head-stamped. These were either Martin or Benet primed copper cases. Early cartridges were stamped "F" for Frankford, or "R" for rifle, or "C" for carbine. Ammunition produced prior to World War I was dated with the numerical month-year headstamp, such as "8 79" or "2 12", indicating August 1879 or February 1912 as the date of manufacture.

Match-grade 7.62 mm (.308) cartridge cases were manufactured in limited quantities.

Cartridges conforming to NATO specifications were marked with the NATO cross (a circle containing a "+").
