= David Wilmot School =

- U.S. National Register of Historic Places
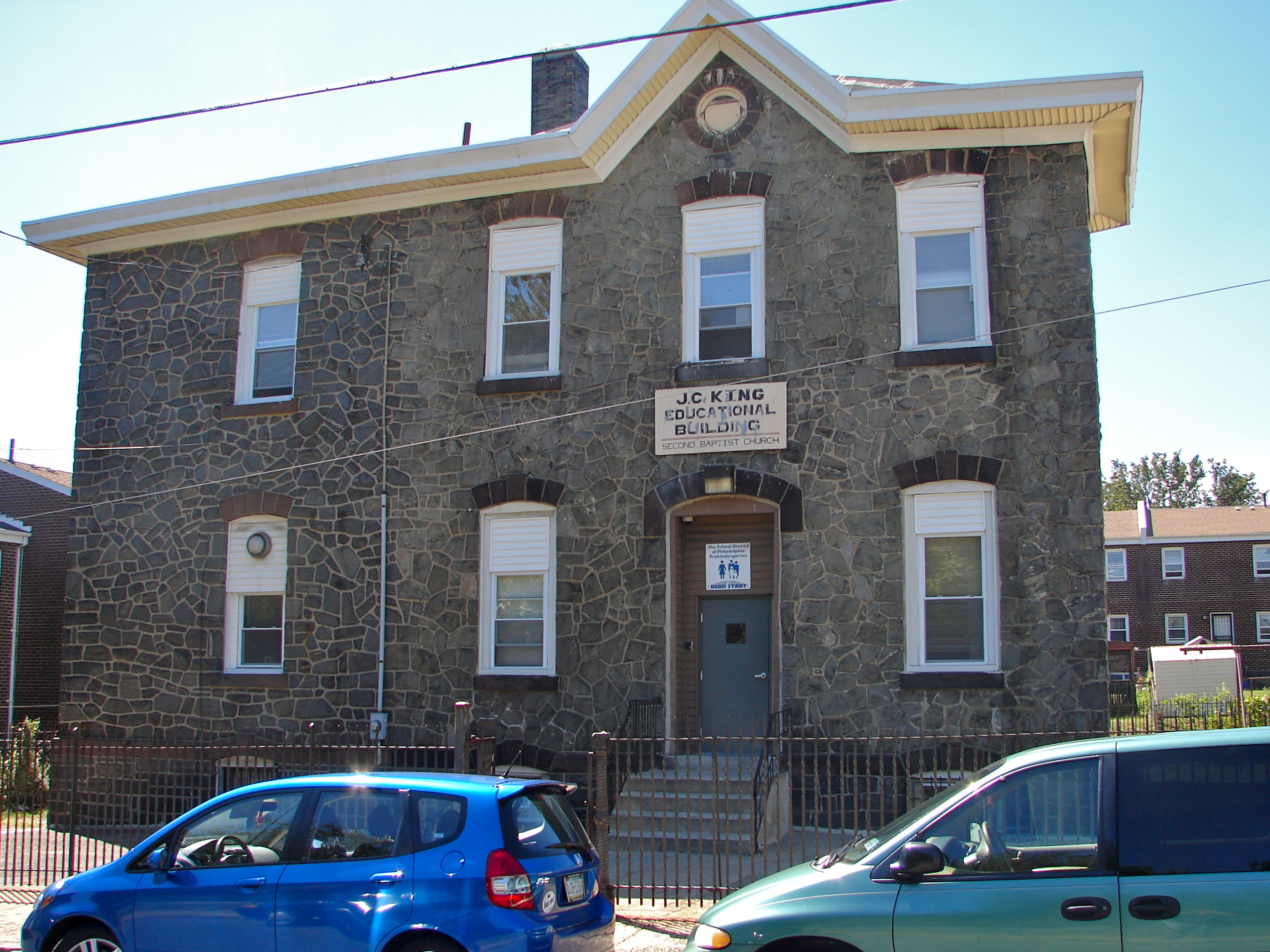
- David Wilmot School, September 2010

- Location within Philadelphia Location within Pennsylvania Location within the United States
- Location: 1734 Meadow Street, Philadelphia, Pennsylvania
- Coordinates: 40.0138°N 75.0808°W
- Area: 2 acres (0.81 ha)
- Built: 1874 & 1908
- Built by: William Keas
- Architect: Lewis H. Esler
- Architectural style: Italianate
- MPS: Philadelphia Public Schools TR
- NRHP reference No.: 88002289
- Added to NRHP: November 18, 1988

The David Wilmot Public School For Coloured Children, also known as the J.C. King Educational Building, is located the Frankford neighborhood of Philadelphia, Pennsylvania. Built in 1874, it is a two-story, four-bay, stone building in the Italianate-design presumably of Lewis H. Esler (1819-1883), a prominent architect employed by the Philadelphia Board of Public Education.

An addition was built in 1908. It features brownstone sills and arches and a gable over the entrance opening. It was named for U.S. political figure and abolitionist, David Wilmot (1814–1868).

It was added to the National Register of Historic Places in 1988.
