= Philadelphia Charter School for Arts and Sciences =

- Henry R. Edmunds School
- U.S. National Register of Historic Places
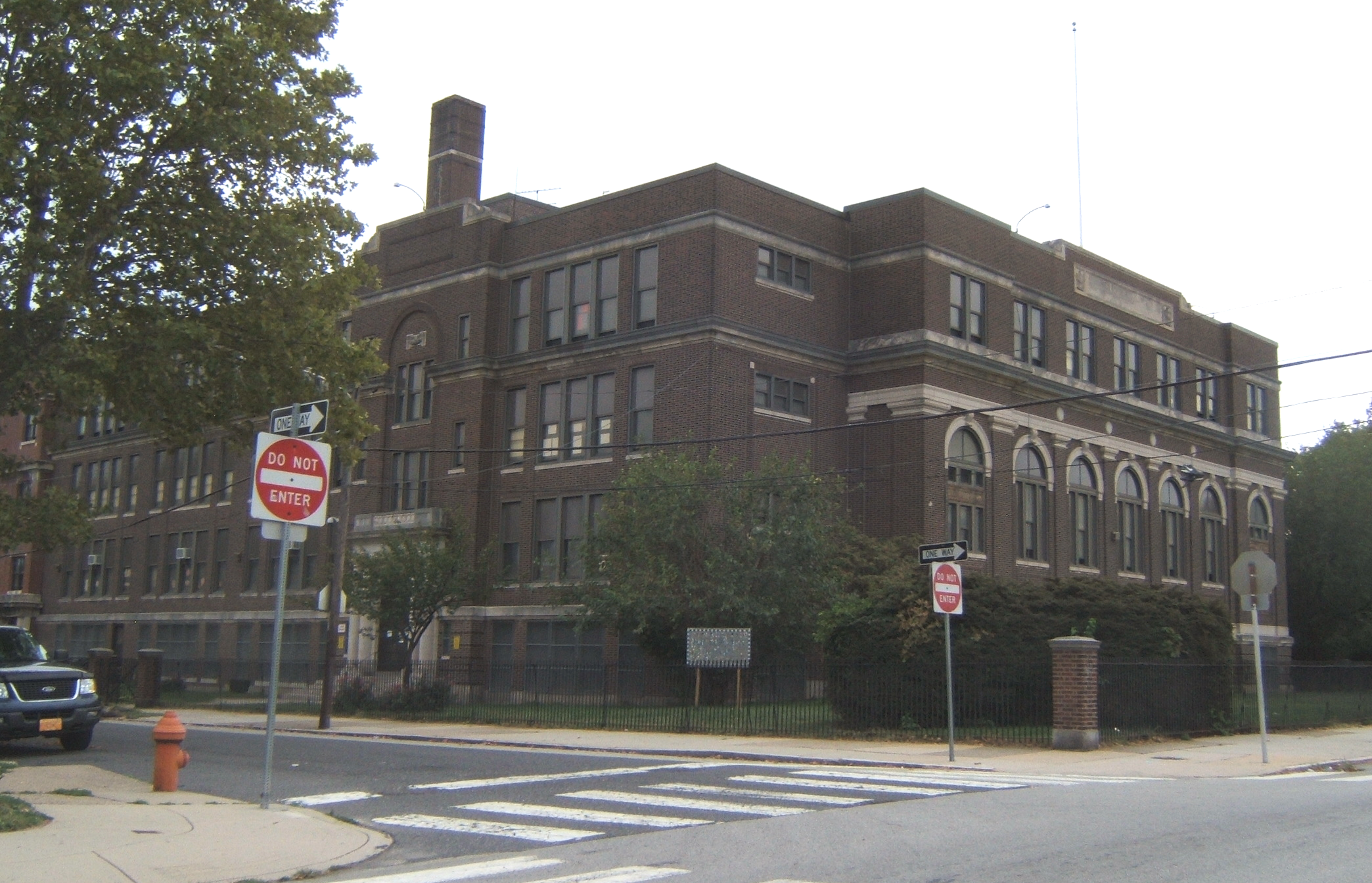
- Henry R. Edmunds School, September 2010

- Location within Philadelphia Location within Pennsylvania Location within the United States
- Location: 1197 Haworth St., Philadelphia, Pennsylvania
- Coordinates: 40°01′30″N 75°05′13″W
- Area: 3 acres (1.2 ha)
- Built: 1923–1924
- Architect: Irwin T. Catharine
- Architectural style: Colonial Revival
- MPS: Philadelphia Public Schools TR
- NRHP reference No.: 88002266
- Added to NRHP: November 18, 1988

The Philadelphia Charter School for Arts and Sciences at H.R. Edmunds is a charter school that is located in the Northwood neighborhood of Philadelphia, Pennsylvania. It operates from the former Henry R. Edmunds School building, which was added to the National Register of Historic Places in 1988.

== History and architectural features ==
This historic building was designed by Irwin T. Catharine and built between 1923 and 1924. It is a three-story, nine-bay, brick building that sits on a raised basement. Designed in the Colonial Revival style, it features a projecting entrance pavilion, stone cornice, and brick parapet.
