= Frankford Creek =

Frankford Creek Tookany Creek, Tacony Creek
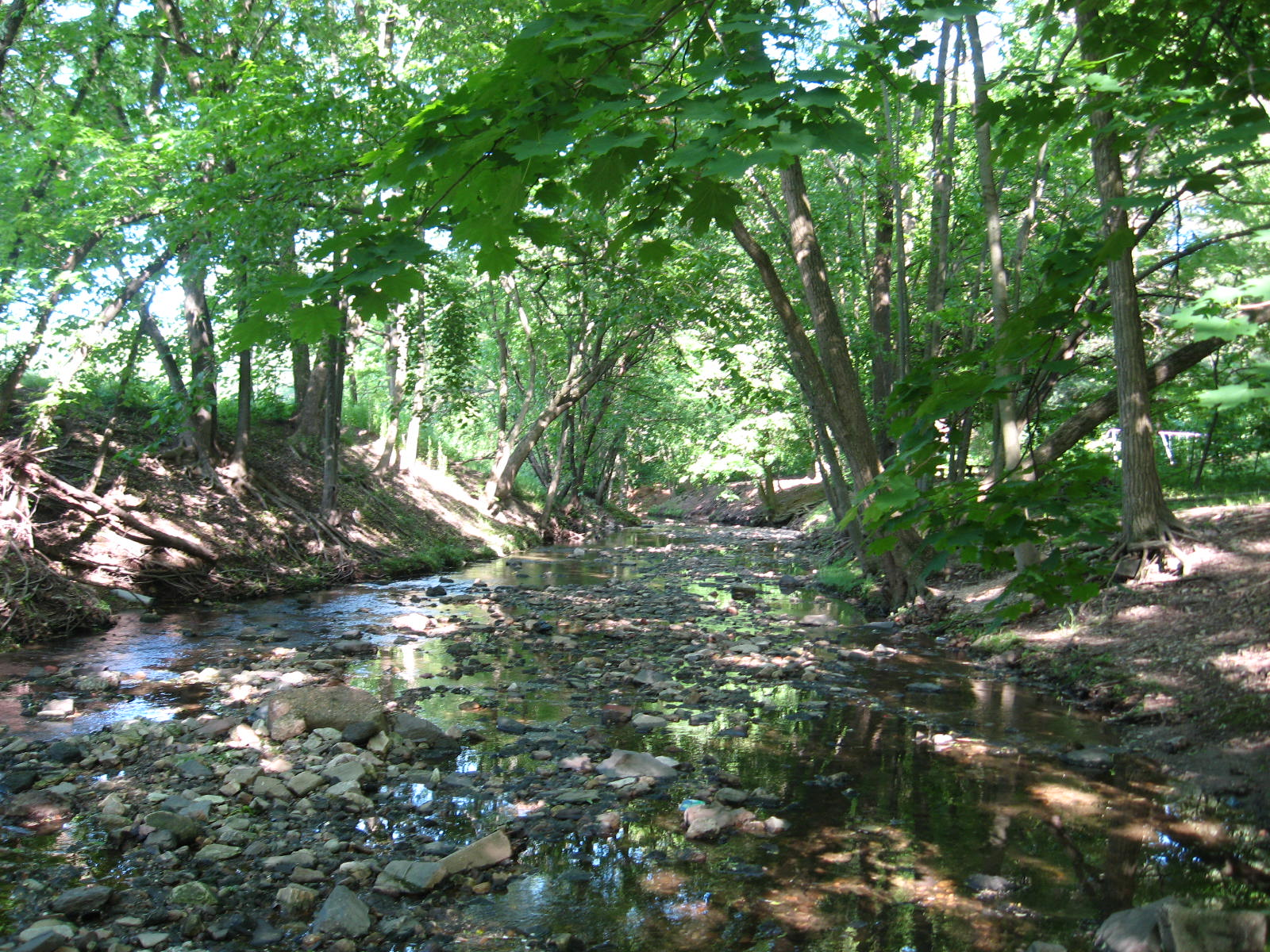
- Tookany Creek in Cheltenham Township

- Location of the Creek in Pennsylvania

Location
- Country: United States
- State: Pennsylvania
- Region: Philadelphia metropolitan area
- District: Montgomery County and Philadelphia County
- Municipality: Cheltenham Township and City of Philadelphia

Physical characteristics
- Source: Hill Crest
  - location: Cheltenham
- Mouth: Delaware River
  - location: Bridesburg/Port Richmond
  - coordinates: 39°59′7.5372″N 75°4′15.2394″W

Basin features
- River system: Delaware River

Frankford Creek is a minor tributary of the Delaware River in southeast Pennsylvania. It derived its name from today's Frankford, Philadelphia neighborhood.

The stream originates as Tookany Creek at Hill Crest in Cheltenham Township and meanders eastward, then southeastward, throughout Cheltenham Township, until a sharp bend near the Philadelphia border at Lawncrest, where the place names Toxony and Tookany were used in historic times; the stream is still known as Tookany Creek in this region, where it flows southwest. Turning south into Philadelphia at the crotch of Philadelphia's V-shaped border, the creek is called Tacony Creek; from here southward, it is considered the informal boundary separating Northeast Philadelphia from the rest of the city.

The Philadelphia neighborhoods of Olney and Feltonville lie on the western side of the stream in this area while Northwood, Lawncrest, Summerdale, and Frankford lie on the eastern side. It continues to be called the Tacony at least until the smaller Wingohocking Creek merges with it in Juniata Park, within the city-owned golf course. Beyond Castor Avenue it is known as Frankford Creek until the stream's confluence with the Delaware River in the Bridesburg neighborhood of Philadelphia. The section of stream known as Frankford Creek is 3.1 miles (5.0 km) long, and the upstream section known as Tacony Creek, from Hill Crest, is 11.1 miles (17.9 km) long.

The Lenape Native Americans who lived within its watershed called the creek Quessionwonmink, which means “Eel Skin River.” Some believe the word Tacony to be derived from another Lenni Lenape word meaning "forest" or "wilderness".

== Sewerization and diversion ==
Portions of its tributary Wingohocking Creek were converted to sewers between 1905 and 1915.

In 1934, the horseshoe bend between Bridge and Margaret Streets (where the creek formed part of the boundary between the Frankford and Bridesburg neighborhoods) was removed as a new straight channel was cut.

In 1949, the creek's path through Frankford was straightened as two horseshoe bends were removed in the vicinity of the intersection of Wyoming and Castor Avenues. An arch structure, the remains of a bridge carrying Wyoming Avenue over one of the removed bends in the creek, is visible from park level (approximately 15 ft (5m) below Wyoming Ave.). A bridge railing along the sidewalk still exists in this location, across from Eastern Regional Medical Center of Cancer Treatment Centers of America (formerly Parkview Hospital). Downstream from Castor Avenue, the creek now flows through a concrete culvert.

In 1956 the creek was diverted to meet the Delaware River at a more southerly point, cutting off its natural bed that curved around Bridesburg along the Frankford Arsenal. Part of that bed was filled, but much of the old creek remains, near its original mouth on the Delaware.

Frankford Creek has been converted to storm sewers along much of its course, as this map shows.

== Historic bridges ==
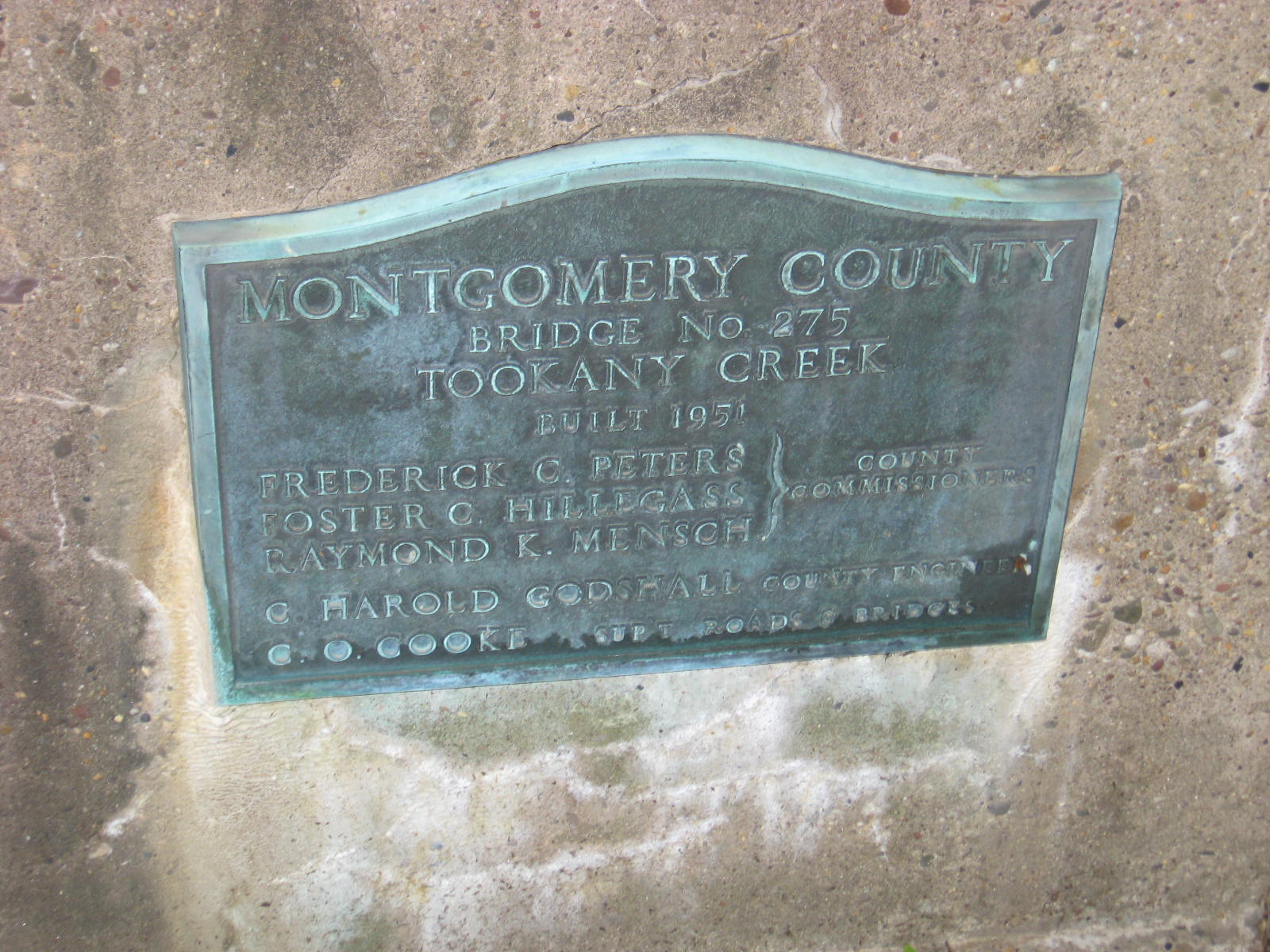
A sign for the crossing of Tookany Creek at Waverly Road in Glenside.

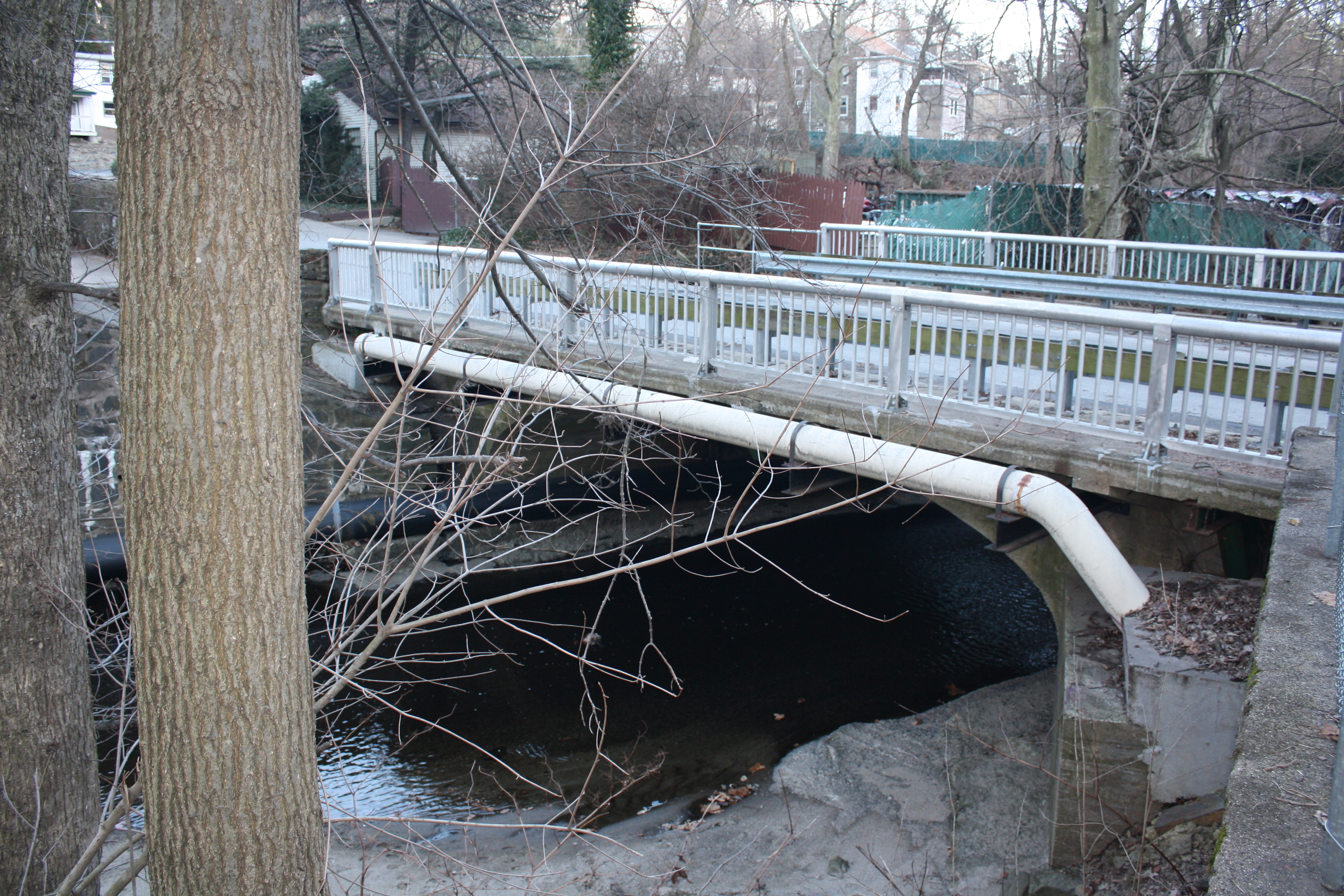
Mill Rd Bridge (1930) over Tookany Creek in Elkins Park.

Several historic bridges cross the Frankford and Tacony (or Tookany) Creeks.

- Fisher's Lane Bridge, a single-span, closed-spandrel stone arch bridge built in 1796, carries Fisher's Lane across Tacony Creek west of Ramona Avenue in Philadelphia.
- The Adams Avenue Bridge, a triple-span, closed-spandrel, filled stone arch bridge built in 1901, carries Adams Avenue across Tacony Creek in Philadelphia's Tacony Creek Park. It was listed on the National Register of Historic Places in 1988.
- A concrete arch bridge, built in 1909, carries Roosevelt Boulevard (US Route 1) over Tacony Creek in Philadelphia.
- Two concrete arch bridges, built in 1909, carry Wyoming Avenue over the old channel of Frankford Creek (since diverted) in Philadelphia.
- A single-span concrete arch bridge, built in 1930, carries Church Road (PA Route 2023) over Tookany Creek in Montgomery County.
- A single-span concrete arch bridge, built in 1930, carries Mill Road over Tookany Creek in Montgomery County.

== Name origins ==
=== Wingohocking Creek ===
Frankford Creek is formed by the union of three streams. One of these, now known as Wingohocking Creek, is so called in a patent to Griffith Jones, 1684. It is called Winconico in a patent to John Goodson, 1701, and Wincokoe in a patent to Griffith Jones of the same year. Wingohocking is defined by Heckewelder to be "a choice spot of land for cultivation, a favorite place for planting, fine land;" whilst Mr. Henry says it means "lands in a hollow or valley." In modern times, the Wingohocking has been called "Logan's Run", from the fact that it flowed through the grounds of the seat of James Logan at Stenton. The Wingohocking rises near Mount Airy, curves generally to the south, and passing through Germantown runs eastwardly until it unites with Tacony Creek near Rowland's saw-mill.

=== Tookany Creek ===
Tookany Creek rises in Montgomery County near Shoemakertown, runs south-west and south, crosses the line of the former Bristol township, and formed the boundary of Bristol and Oxford townships. Rock Run enters Tookany Creek southwest of what was formerly Whitaker's factory.

The Little Tacony rises near the Township-line Road between Dublin and Oxford, runs nearly south through Oxford township, and is joined by one or two brooks, and empties into Frankford Creek east of Frankford. The stream is now called Frankford Creek from the junction of Tacony and Wingohocking creeks, and enters the Delaware near the U.S. Arsenal.

Tacony is called Taoconik in a patent to Robert Adams, 1684; Toaconinck in a patent to Griffith Jones in the same year; and Toaconinck Township is referenced on Thomas Holme's 1687 survey map. Little Tacony is also called Tackawanna. Mr. Henry says Tacony is derived from Tekene and means "woods" or "an uninhabited place."

=== Others ===
Into Frankford Creek near the Delaware empties a stream called Freaheatah. Frankford Creek derives its name from the village of Frankford, adjoining. On Lindstrom's map it is called "Aleskins Kylen", La Riviere des Anguilles Ecorchees (meaning "the river of skinned eels"), the origin of which can only be conjectured. A portion of the creek east of the junction of the Little Tacony is called Questioninck in a patent to Eric Cock and others, and Quissinuaminck in a patent to Thomas Fairman, 1688.

"Changes in the Names of Streams In and About Philadelphia". Public Ledger Almanac: 1879. Pages 3, 5, 7, 9, 11, & 13.

== Community impact ==
Frankford Creek has a great impact on the Cheltenham and North Philadelphia Communities. For many children growing up in the area, it provided them with their first experience for learning about ecosystems and opportunities for community projects. It also spurred the formation of several parks, including Wall Park, High School Park, Tookany Creek Parkway in Cheltenham, and Olney Park, Juniata Park, and Womrath Park in Philadelphia. It is one of the few urban meadows in the Philadelphia area.

Cobbs Creek has a similar impact for West Philadelphia and Upper Darby children.

== See also ==
- List of parks in Philadelphia
- List of rivers of Pennsylvania
- Cobbs Creek
- Frankford Powder-Mill
