= Greenleaf at Cheltenham =

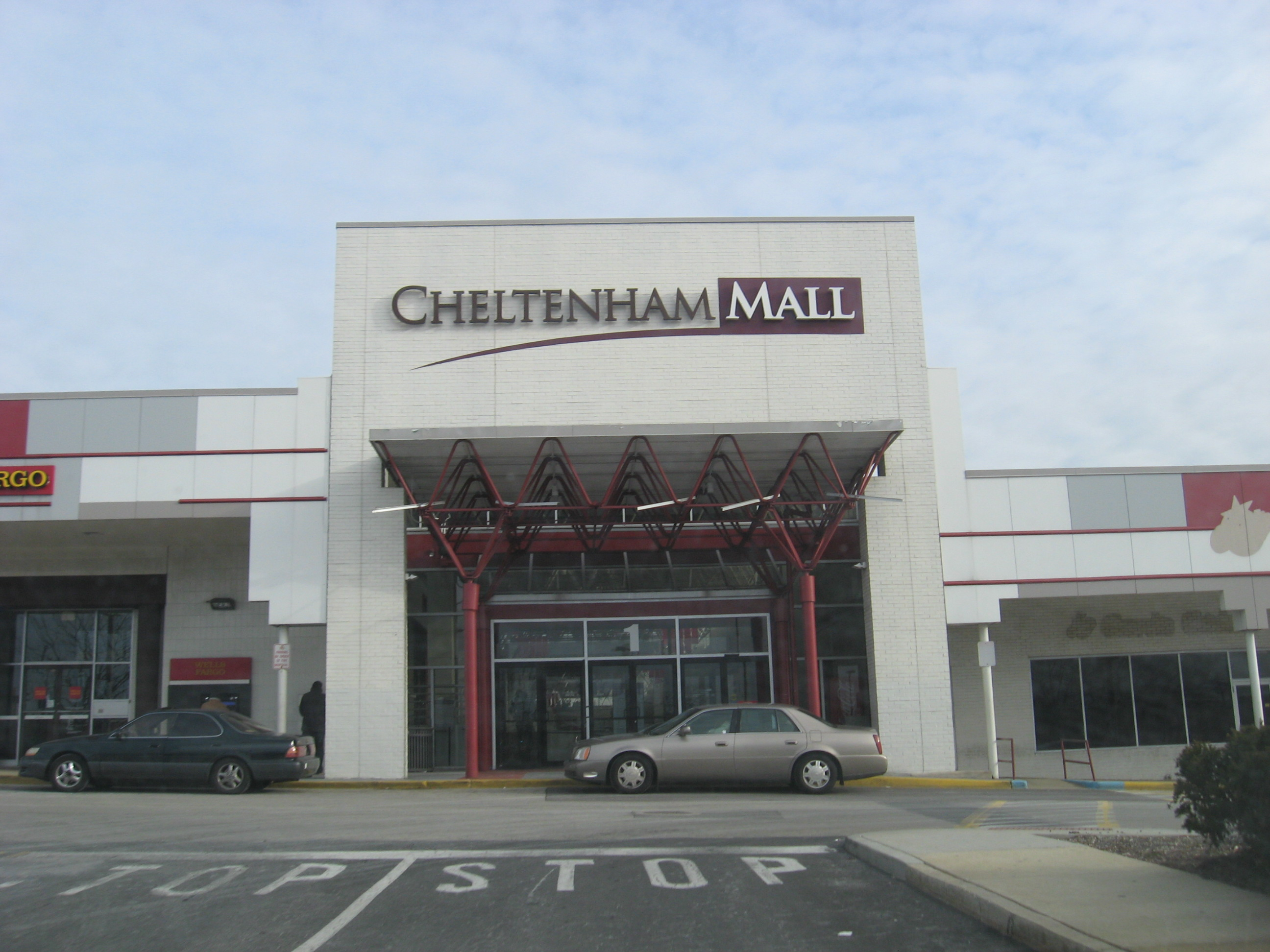
- Former Cheltenham Mall, looking Northeast
- Location: Cheltenham Township, Pennsylvania, U.S.
- Coordinates: 40.072398°N 75.154059°W
- Address: 2385 Cheltenham Avenue; Philadelphia, PA 19150
- Opened: 1959 (as Cheltenham Square Mall); April 20, 2018 (as Greenleaf at Cheltenham)
- Closed: C. 2016 (as Cheltenham Square Mall)
- Developer: Edward J. DeBartolo Corporation
- Manager: Metro Commercial
- Owner: Metro Commercial
- Num. of stores: 20
- Num. of anchor tenants: 4
- Floor area: 774,470 square feet (71,951 m^{2})
- Floors: 1
- Parking: Parking lot
- Public transit: SEPTA bus: 6, 16, 22, 71, 72, 81
- Website: Greenleaf at Cheltenham

Greenleaf at Cheltenham, formerly the Cheltenham Square Mall, is an outdoor shopping center and former enclosed shopping mall, which is situated on Cheltenham Avenue between Ogontz Avenue (PA 309) and Washington Lane on the border of Philadelphia and Cheltenham Township, Pennsylvania. It draws most of its customers from Northwest Philadelphia.

Greenleaf at Cheltenham is anchored by Target, ShopRite, Burlington, and The Home Depot and contains smaller stores and restaurants such as Marshalls, LA Fitness, Old Navy, Panda Express, Mad Rag, KicksUSA, Oak Street Health, and Chipotle Mexican Grill.

== History ==
Cheltenham Square Mall, formerly the Cheltenham Shopping Center, opened in 1959 and was enclosed in 1981. Developed by the Edward J. DeBartolo Corporation, it originally featured a Gimbels as the main anchor store. As part of the 1981 enclosure project, Clover was added as a second anchor.

It had 634,052 sq ft (58,900 m^{2}) of retail space. The mall was taken over by New York City based Thor Equities when Simon Property Group sold the mall in 2005 for $71.5 million.

Gimbels was an original anchor and closed in 1986. The lower level of the store became a ShopRite grocery store in 1995, and the upper level was slated to become a Bradlees discount store a year later. However, Bradlees never opened due to bankruptcy, so their space instead became Burlington Coat Factory (now known as Burlington). Also in 1997, the Clover store closed and was replaced by Value City.

In December 2005, Cheltenham Mall was acquired by Thor Equities for $71.5 million from Simon Property Group. In 2009, Target replaced the United Artists Theatre and moved in as an anchor.

In summer 2014, the mall was foreclosed and put up for sale. Sun Equity Partners purchased the mall for $30 million in January 2015. The mall underwent renovations and opened new stores as an outdoor shopping center starting in 2018. The property was renamed Greenleaf at Cheltenham after redevelopment.

On April 20, 2018, a grand opening was held for the Greenleaf at Cheltenham shopping center.
