= SEPTA Route 50 (trolley) =

Route 50
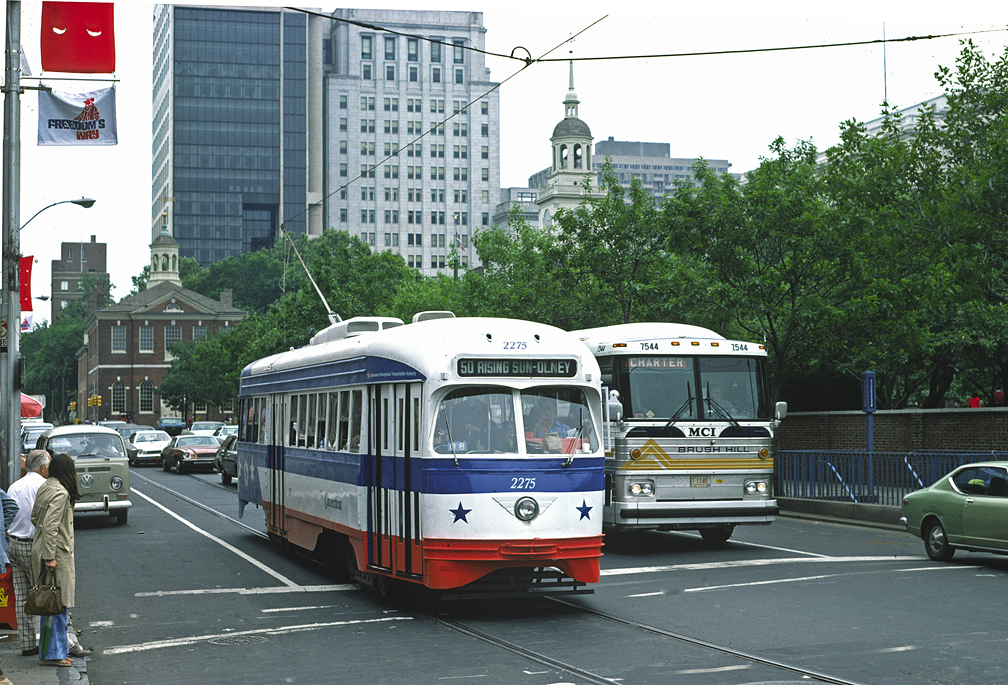
- The former Route 50 Trolley at 5th and Market Streets in May 1976.

Overview
- Operator: Southeastern Pennsylvania Transportation Authority
- Garage: Luzerne Depot
- Status: Operational (as bus line)
- Began service: 1858
- Ended service: 1980 (as a streetcar line)

Route
- Locale: Philadelphia
- Communities served: Fox Chase, Lawndale, Logan, Center City, South Philadelphia
- Start: 6th & Oregon
- Via: Fifth Street, Oxford Avenue, Rising Sun Avenue
- End: Rising Sun & Knorr

Service
- Ridership: 643,720 (FY19)

Route 50 is a former streetcar line that was operated by SEPTA in Philadelphia, Pennsylvania.

The route ran from the Northeast Philadelphia neighborhood of Fox Chase on Oxford Avenue and then through Lawndale along Rising Sun Avenue, and for a brief period it also shared tracks with SEPTA Trolley Route 47, which was abandoned by the SEPTA Board on June 14, 1969. The Route 50 line then ran southbound down 6th Street in North Philadelphia and then onto 4th and northbound 5th streets in South Philadelphia to and from its southern terminus of 6th Street and Oregon Avenue. A grade-separated subway tunnel was constructed for Route 50 to use while running north under Vine Street. Vine Street Station was the only stop underground, and still exists today, albeit boarded up. The tunnel is still used today by vehicle traffic, and its Philadelphia Transportation Company heritage is evident in its design.

In 1976, this line saw and used the 1934 Blackpool England "Boat Car" trolley during the Bicentennial of the Declaration of Independence. SEPTA stopped running trolleys on October 11, 1980, claiming the closure was temporary, however the tracks & overhead wires remained in place. In 1983 despite denials by SEPTA management that the closure was intended to be permanent, SEPTA track crews tore up the Route 50 trolley tracks on 5th Street south of Girard Avenue.

Route 50 cars were stored at the former Luzerne Carhouse, which was located on the southwest corner of 10th and Luzerne streets. Luzerne Carhouse was shared by the Route 53 and 56 trolleys, before it was converted into an all bus garage. Today it survives as a cardboard recycling plant.

== Decline and revival in name only ==
Despite public criticism by community and transit advocates, SEPTA voted to close the Route 50 trolley line permanently on October 23, 1985. Additionally, the plan involved the closing of the SEPTA Route 6 trolley line along Ogontz Avenue, which was not eliminated and replaced with a bus line until January 11, 1986. Earlier the same year, the Route 53 (Wayne Avenue) trolley was also closed, on May 16, 1985.

== Current service ==
SEPTA Route 50 is a SEPTA bus line in Northeast Philadelphia, which runs from the Frankford Transportation Center to Parx Casino and Racing in Bensalem. All buses along this route are ADA-compliant, and contain bicycle racks.
