= Cheltenham Avenue =

Road in Philadelphia, Pennsylvania, US

Route information
- Maintained by PennDOT, Philadelphia, and Springfield Township
- Length: 9.0 mi (14.5 km)
- History: Commissioned in 1682
- Component highways: PA 309 between Ogontz Avenue and PA 611

Major junctions
- West end: Paper Mill Road in Flourtown
- PA 309 in Cheltenham; PA 611 in East Oak Lane; US 1 / US 13 / PA 232 in Lawncrest
- East end: Keystone Street in Wissinoming

Location
- Country: United States
- State: Pennsylvania
- Counties: Philadelphia

Highway system
- Pennsylvania State Route System; Interstate; US; State; Scenic; Legislative

Cheltenham Avenue is a major east–west road in Philadelphia and its suburbs. It is served by SEPTA bus routes, trolleys, regional rail, and subway. Cheltenham Avenue is an unsigned quadrant route in Montgomery County. It serves as the border between Springfield and Cheltenham townships. A section of the road along the Philadelphia border with Cheltenham Township is part of PA Route 309.

== Route description ==
Cheltenham Avenue has two sections, divided by Frankford Creek and SEPTA's Fox Chase regional rail line.

=== Western section ===
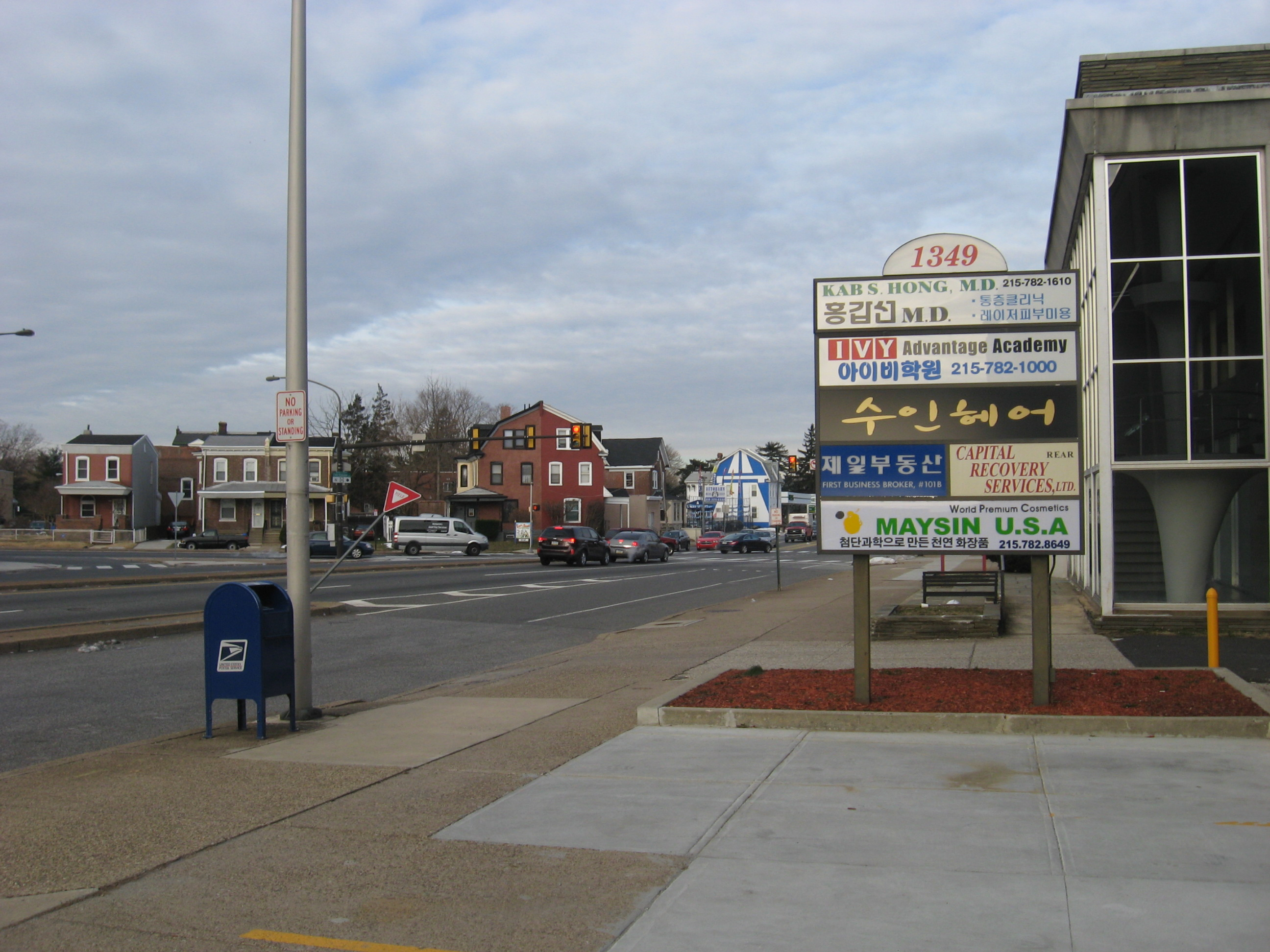
Koreatown businesses along Cheltenham Avenue in Cheltenham Township

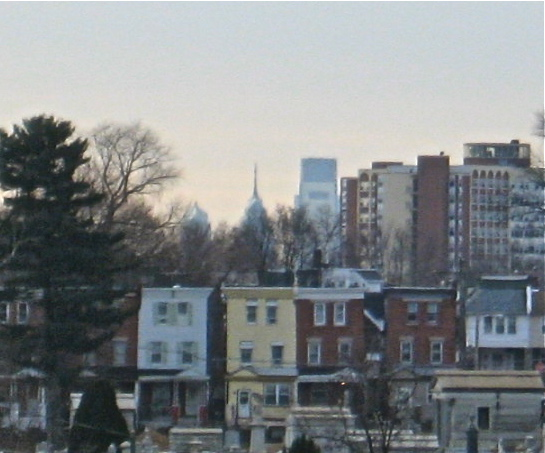
Center City Philadelphia's skyline seen from Cheltenham Avenue

Cheltenham Avenue begins in Springfield Township at the intersection with Paper Mill Road. It runs southeast up a hill, where it passes LaSalle College High School and forms the border between Springfield and Cheltenham Township. Following several steep ascends and climbs, Springfield Township ends on the south side of the road, and the road begins as a border between Cheltenham and Philadelphia, near the Holy Sepulchre Cemetery.

Following a busy intersection with Easton Road, Cheltenham Avenue passes the Cedarbrook Shopping Center, and the Towers at Wyncote. Cheltenham Avenue then has another major intersection with Ogontz Avenue. This point begins the west end of the PA 309 overlap, as well as the end of the Fort Washington Expressway. The Greenleaf at Cheltenham shopping center also sits at the northeast corner of this intersection, as well as the Cheltenham-Ogontz Bus Loop, a major terminus for several SEPTA bus routes.

After crossing over Washington Lane, Cheltenham Avenue passes many strip malls and busy residential neighborhoods. After passing a small cemetery on the right (where the skyline of Philadelphia is just visible), Cheltenham Avenue intersects with the northern terminus of Broad Street. Immediately following the Broad Street intersection is the southern terminus of PA 309. Soon after, Cheltenham Avenue intersects PA 611 and historic Old York Road.

After these intersections, Cheltenham Avenue goes under several overpasses and winds its way to its at Tookany Creek Parkway/Crescentville Road, near the Tookany Creek. Final elevation is 66 feet above sea level.

=== Eastern section ===
Cheltenham Avenue begins again in the Lawndale section of the city, just east of the Fox Chase Line. It continues southeast through and intersects with several major streets such as Rising Sun Avenue and Tabor Avenue, at which it intersects with a US Defense Industrial Supply building and Fels Samuel High School.

After several blocks of row houses, Cheltenham Avenue hits Oxford Circle, a major intersection of the Roosevelt Boulevard (which carries US 1 and US 13), Oxford Avenue (PA 232), and Castor Avenue. It then continues through more row houses and passes to the northeast of Frankford Transportation Center, a major SEPTA stop and terminal for the Market-Frankford Line.

After passing by several cemeteries and Wissinoming Park, Cheltenham Avenue has major intersections with both Harbison Avenue and Torresdale Avenue. Cheltenham Avenue then winds through a few more blocks of houses, before it comes to its terminus at Keystone Street, just west of Amtrak's Northeast Corridor tracks, Interstate 95, and the Delaware River. Final elevation is 29 feet above sea level.

== Attractions ==
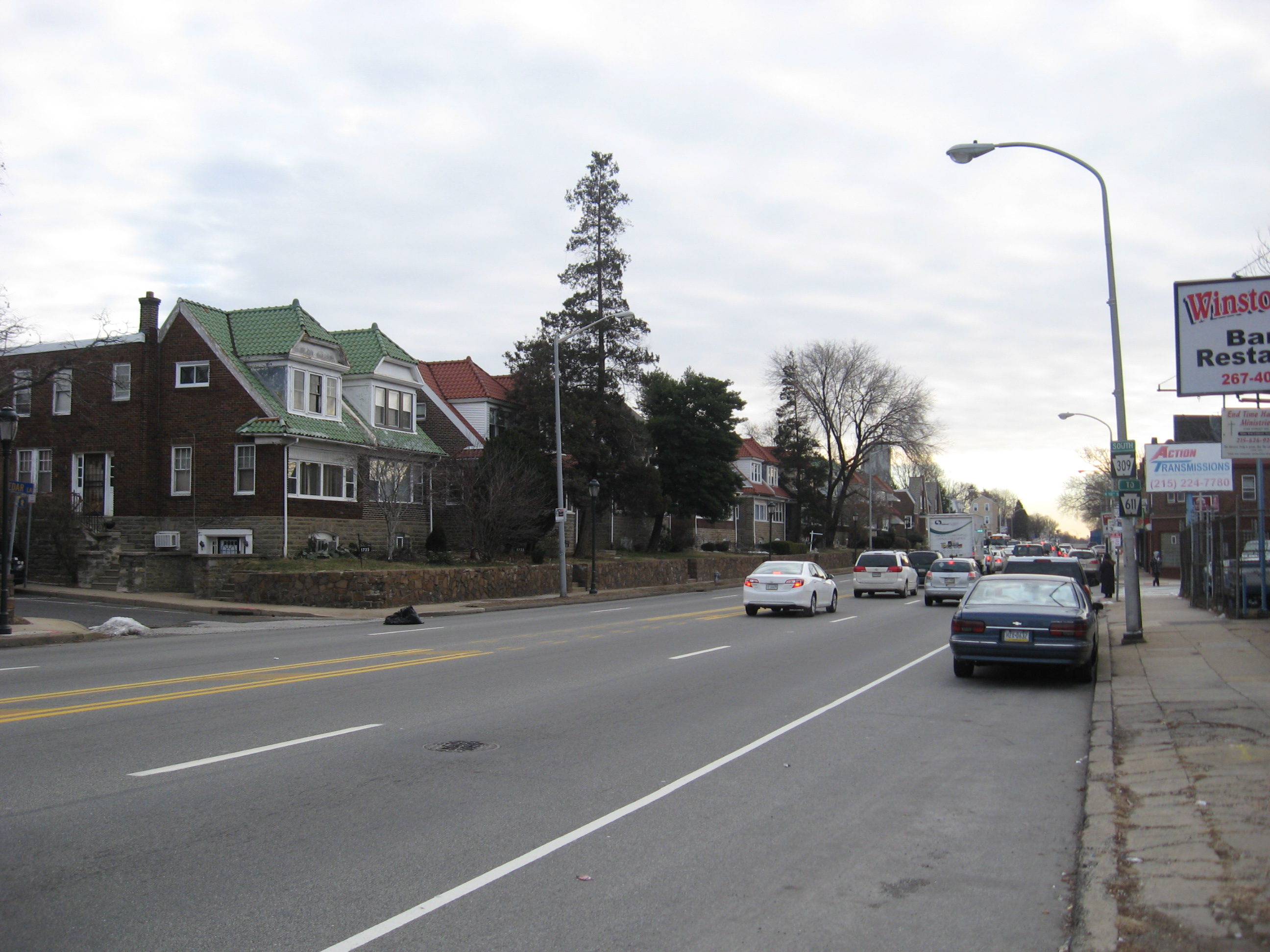
Rowhouses in Cheltenham Township along Cheltenham Avenue

- Greenleaf at Cheltenham
- Holy Sepulchre Cemetery
- Camptown Historic District
- Temple Stadium
- Northwood Cemetery
- North Cedar Hills Cemetery
- Mount Carmel Cemetery
- Cedar Hill Cemetery
- Wissinoming Park
- Mount Sinai Cemetery
- Moss Playground

== Public transportation ==
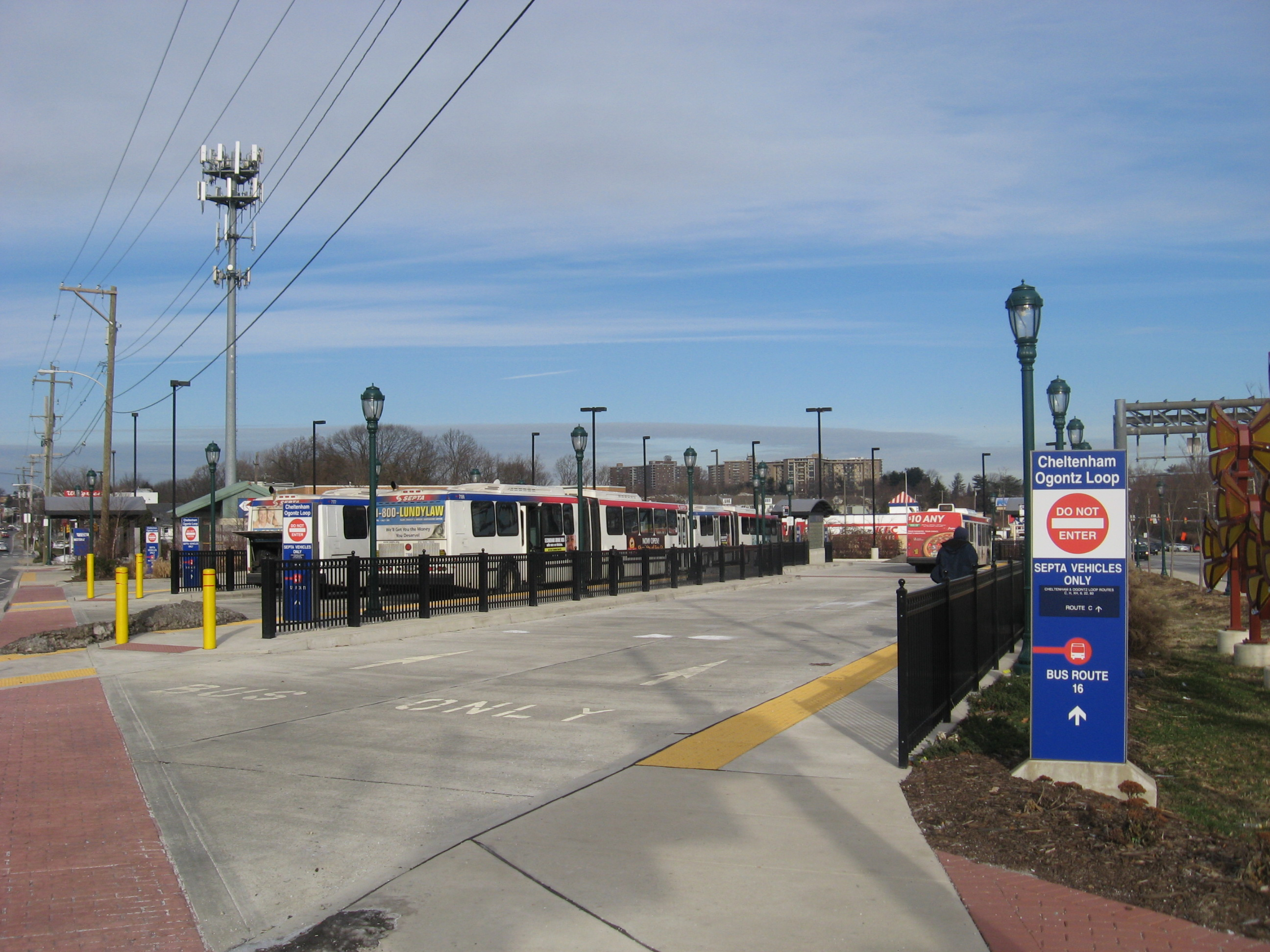
Cheltenham-Ogontz Bus Loop, a major SEPTA bus terminal

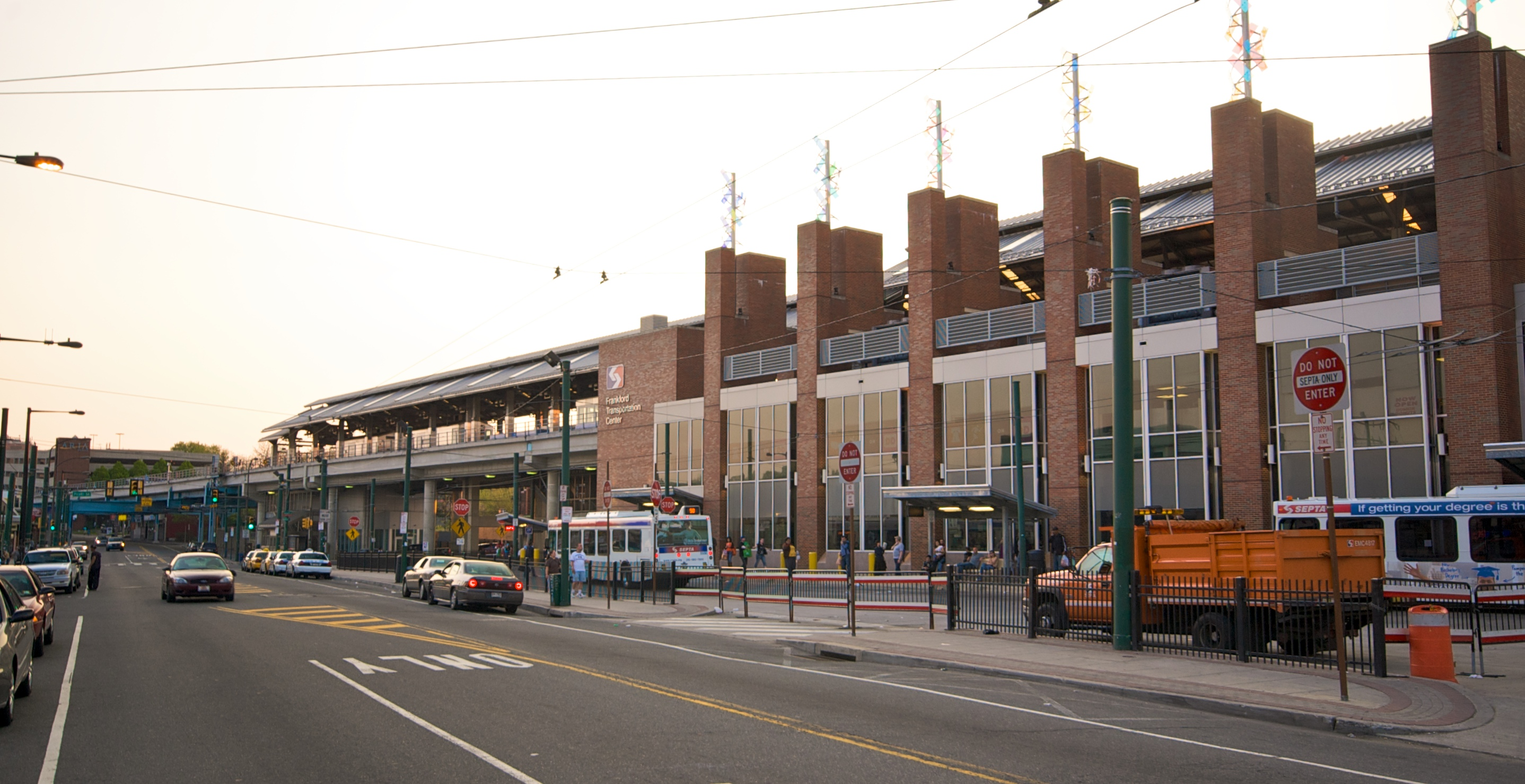
Frankford Transportation Center located along Cheltenham Avenue, terminal for the L.

Cheltenham Avenue is a major thruway for many SEPTA bus, Regional Rail, and Subway routes.

=== Bus ===
- 1
- 6
- 14
- 16
- 18
- 20
- 22
- 24
- 25
- 26
- 28
- 55
- 56
- 57
- 58
- 67
- 70
- 71
- 73
- 77
- 80
- 81
- 84
- 88
- C (formerly)

=== Trackless Trolley ===
- 59
- 66

=== Subway ===
- Market-Frankford Line

=== Regional Rail ===
- Fox Chase Line
- Main Line (Airport Line, Lansdale/Doylestown Line, Warminster Line, West Trenton Line)

== Education ==
- LaSalle College High School
- Springfield Township High School (adjacent to western terminus)
- Cheltenham High School (adjacent to beginning of PA-309 overlap)
- Fels Samuel High School

== Neighborhoods ==
- Erdenheim
- Wyndmoor
- Laverock
- Glenside
- Wyncote
- Cedarbrook
- Stenton
- La Mott
- West Oak Lane
- Elkins Park
- Melrose Park
- Oak Lane
- Lawncrest
- Oxford Circle
- Northwood
- Frankford
- Wissinoming

== History ==
The Philadelphia Rapid Transit Company (later became SEPTA) ran many trollies along Cheltenham Avenue, including the famous Route 6 which began service in 1907. It carried many Philadelphians from the Olney Transportation Center to Willow Grove Amusement Park. Trolley service from Cheltenham Avenue to Willow Grove ended in 1958, and the entire route was shut down and replaced by buses in 1985. Today, the route is covered by bus route 22.
