= Logan, Philadelphia =

Logan
- Neighborhood of Philadelphia
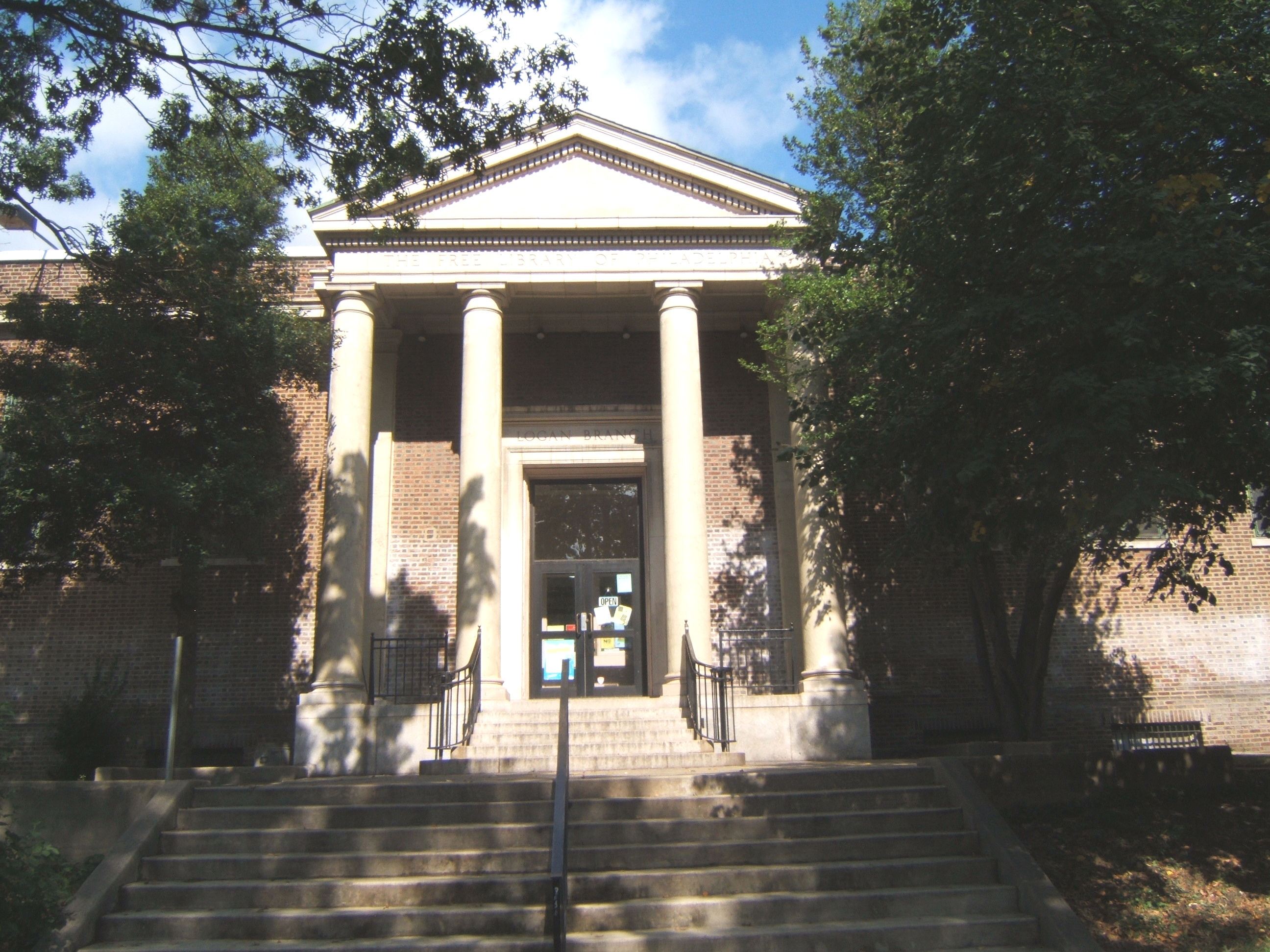
- Free Library Logan Branch

- Location within Philadelphia
- Country: United States
- State: Pennsylvania
- County: Philadelphia
- City: Philadelphia
- Area codes: 215, 267 and 445

Logan is a neighborhood in the upper North Philadelphia section of the city of Philadelphia, in the U.S. state of Pennsylvania. The majority of the neighborhood falls within the 19141 zip code, but some of it falls within 19140. Olney Avenue extends from both the Olney and Logan neighborhoods of the city. The Olney Transportation Center is located in Logan.

== History ==
The area was once part of the plantation of James Logan, adviser to William Penn, founder of Pennsylvania. Modern transportation formed the community: the Broad Street subway, which opened in 1928, and a thriving network of streetcar and bus routes, allowed development of what was then considered one of the earliest suburban communities in Philadelphia, though the area is considered urban today. The transportation network still provides Logan residents easy access to the rest of the city.

On the East side of Broad St., Logan was a predominantly Jewish neighborhood until the 1960s. 11th Street was a center of commerce with two bakeries, a deli, and a dairy store. West of Broad, the neighborhood was predominantly Irish Catholic in the 1950s to early 1979s.

Broad Street was the main shopping area for Logan, from Windrim to Rockland streets. This area had three movie theaters, The Logan, The Rockland, and The Broad, clothing shops, a hardware store, a shoe store and an ice cream shop, among others.

In the 1970s, Korean people began moving into Logan and established businesses. By the mid-1980s Koreans began moving out of Logan and into sections such as Olney in Philadelphia, and nearby suburbs such as Cheltenham as the area began to gentrify, as African-Americans and Hispanics, which accompanied the migration of Koreans into the neighborhood from the previous decade, began to populate the area, as Koreans began to migrate out of the Logan section and into the nearby suburbs further from Philadelphia.

In 1980, the Fishers Lane Historic District was created, certifying 12 Second Empire and Italianate architecture style buildings.

== Geography ==
The neighborhood is bordered by the Hunting Park neighborhood to the south, the Tioga/Nicetown neighborhood to the southwest, the Feltonville neighborhood to the southeast, the Germantown neighborhood to the west, the Olney neighborhood to the east, the Ogontz/Belfield neighborhood to the northwest, and the Fern Rock neighborhood to the north. The terrain is generally flat. Wingohocking Creek flows under Wingohocking Street along Logan's southern border.

Numerous homes have been razed in the Southern portion of the neighborhood because they sunk into the landfill on which they were built. This area today is known as the Logan Triangle.

== Demographics ==
As of the census of 2010, the racial makeup of Logan is 59.7% African American, 29.1% Hispanic, 5.4% Asian, 3.9% white, and 2% from other races. The neighborhood is mainly made up of African Americans and Puerto Ricans.

== Education ==
=== Primary, secondary, and higher education ===
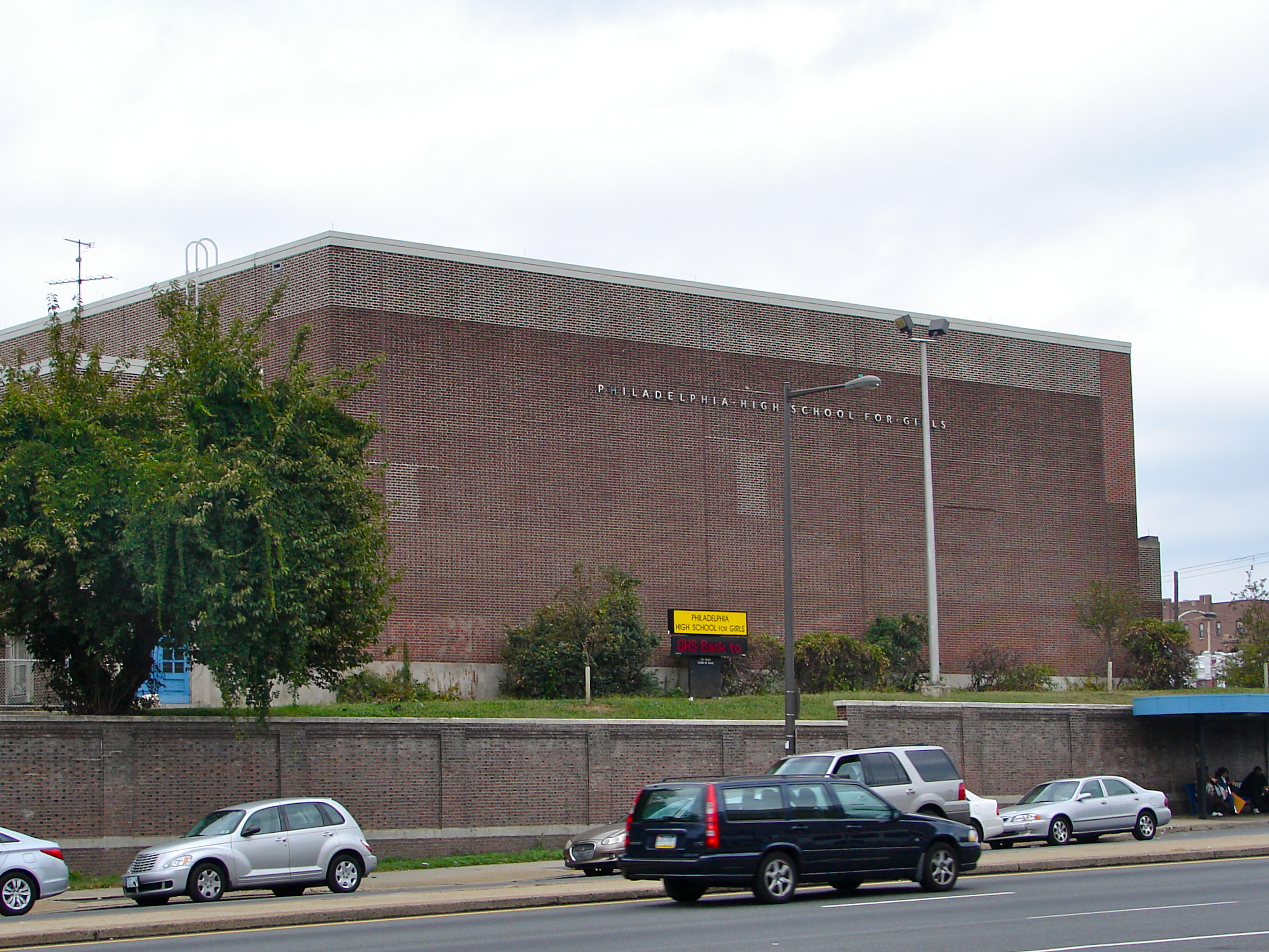
Philadelphia Girls' High School

Logan is a part of the School District of Philadelphia.

Elementary schools:

- Birney Elementary School
- Jay Cooke Elementary School
- James Logan Elementary School
- Thurgood Marshall Elementary
- St. Vincent dePaul School
- Jay Cooke Junior High School
- Gen. David B. Birney School

High schools:

- Central High School (magnet school)
- Philadelphia High School for Girls (magnet school)
- Widener Memorial School
- Delaware Valley Charter High School (charter)

Logan is also home to one college: La Salle University, a private, co-educational, Roman Catholic university founded in 1863 by the Christian Brothers religious order. La Salle is located in the northwestern corner of the neighborhood.

== Museums ==
The Stenton is the former home of James Logan, colonial Mayor of Philadelphia and Chief Justice of the Pennsylvania Supreme Court. This home has been turned into a house museum.

La Salle University Art Museum is a six gallery museum located on La Salle's campus.

=== Public libraries ===
The Free Library of Philadelphia Logan Branch serves Logan. It was built in 1917.

== Health care ==
The principal hospital is Einstein Medical Center Philadelphia, also a significant employer in the region. As of Autumn 2008, Quality Community Health Care has opened the Cooke Family Health Center.

== Economy ==
In the past factories were clustered in a few areas; historically they were diverse, and included Mrs. Smith's Pies on Lindley Avenue and the Fleer Baseball Card Gum Company near 10th Street and Lindley. Four block commercial districts of retailers and neighborhood businesses stretch along Broad Street and the parallel Old York Road.

== Transportation ==
SEPTA buses 16, 18, 26, and 41 run in this neighborhood. Olney Transportation Center is on Olney Avenue in Logan. Olney Transportation Center is served by SEPTA bus routes 6, 8, 16, 18, 22, 26, 51, and 55. The Broad Street Line subway also serves Olney Transportation Center. The subway travels from North Philadelphia to Center City and South Philadelphia.

The Logan neighborhood has three stops on the Broad Street Line:

- Olney Transportation Center (upper/north Logan) - located near Philadelphia High School for Girls, Widener High School, Albert Einstein Medical Center, Central High School, and La Salle University
- Logan station (mid-Logan) located near Logan's Branch of the Free Library of Philadelphia, Delaware Valley Charter High School, and Cristo Ray High School
- Wyoming station (south Logan) - located near the Stenton Park, Logan Triangle, and Roosevelt Boulevard

== Notable people ==
- David Goodis, author noir novels, including Dark Passage and Shoot the Piano Player
- Lisa "Left Eye" Lopes, singer and rapper in TLC
- Michael "Bass" McCary, former bass singer of Boyz II Men
