= James Logan Elementary School =

- Logan Demonstration School
- U.S. National Register of Historic Places
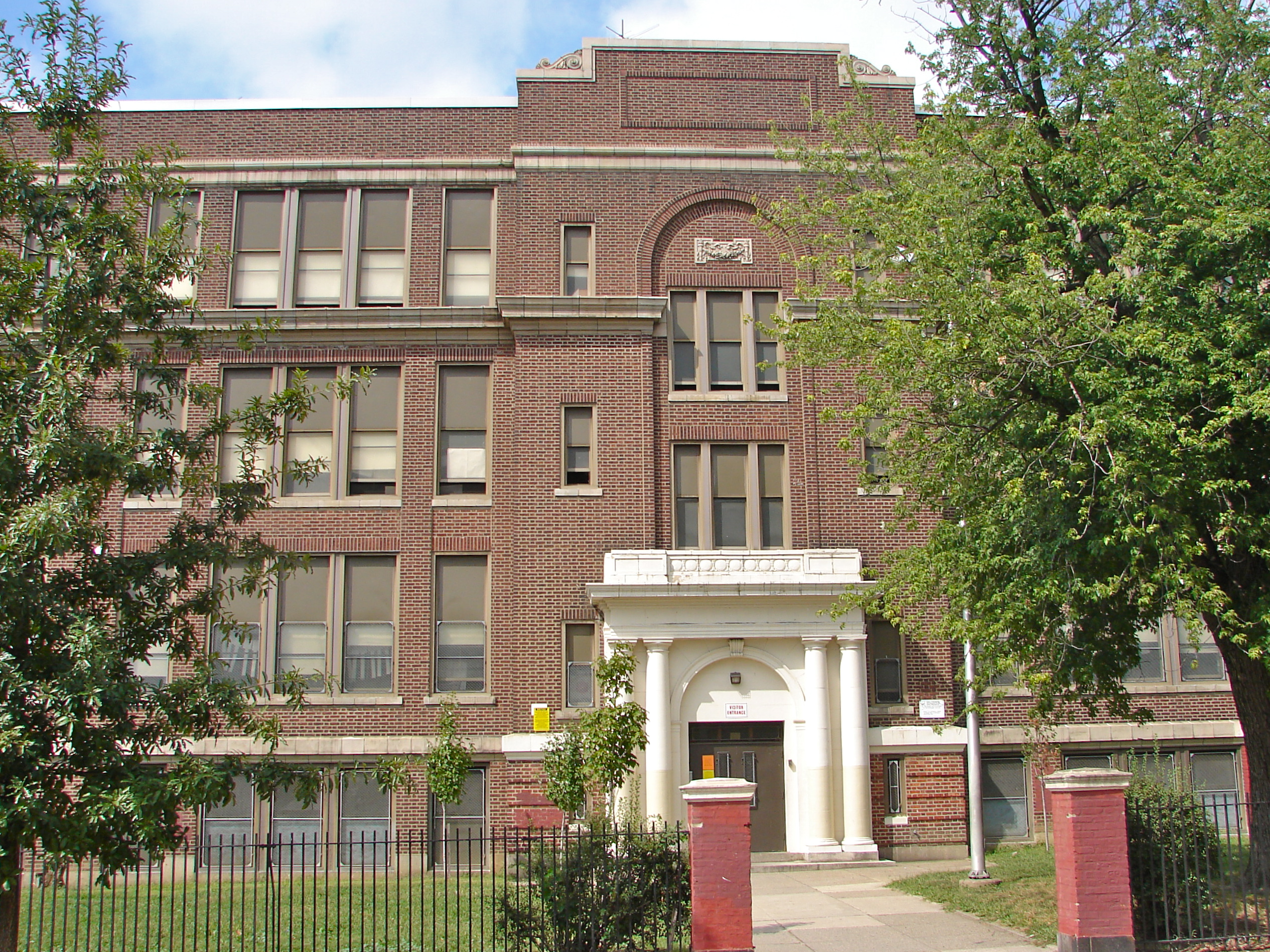
- Logan Demonstration School, September 2010

- Location within Philadelphia Location within Pennsylvania Location within the United States
- Location: 5000 N. 17th St., Philadelphia, Pennsylvania
- Coordinates: 40°01′52″N 75°09′07″W
- Area: 3.3 acres (1.3 ha)
- Built: 1923-1924
- Built by: Sinclair & Grigg
- Architect: Irwin T. Catharine
- Architectural style: Colonial Revival
- MPS: Philadelphia Public Schools TR
- NRHP reference No.: 88002293
- Added to NRHP: November 18, 1988

The James Logan Elementary School is a historic American elementary school building in the Logan neighborhood of Philadelphia, Pennsylvania.

It is part of the School District of Philadelphia, and was added to the National Register of Historic Places in 1988 as the Logan Demonstration School.

== History and architectural features ==
The building was designed by Irwin T. Catharine and built between 1923 and 1924. It is a three-story, nine-bay, U-shaped, brick building with a raised basement. It was designed in the Colonial Revival-style, and features a central entrance pavilion, round arched surrounds, and a brick parapet.

It was added to the National Register of Historic Places in 1988 as the Logan Demonstration School.
