= Wissinoming, Philadelphia =

Wissinoming
- Neighborhood of Philadelphia
- Location within Philadelphia
- Country: United States
- State: Pennsylvania
- County: Philadelphia County
- City: Philadelphia
- Area codes: 215, 267, and 445

Wissinoming is a neighborhood in the Near Northeast section of Philadelphia, United States. It was the site of locomotive builder Matthias Baldwin's estate "Wissinoming", which was located near Tacony and Van Kirk Streets. The current Wissinoming is bordered by Mayfair on the west and Tacony on the north, Bridesburg on the south (below Bridge Street), I-95 and the Delaware River on the east, and Frankford on the southwest (below Bridge Street). Wissinoming has two ZIP codes: 19124 and 19135. Physical boundaries are: Levick Street on the north, Bridge Street on the south, I-95 and the Delaware River on the east, and Frankford Avenue on the west.

Wissinoming Creek, buried in the 1930s, drained a watershed through Wissinoming that included the main stream and another tributary, Little Wissinoming Creek. The name derives its name from a Lenni Lenape term meaning “where the grapes grow”.

== Schools ==
Wissinoming has two public elementary schools: James J. Sullivan Elementary School (located on Ditman Street and Sanger Street) and Henry W. Lawton Elementary School (located on Ditman Street and Benner Street). The border of the two schools (Sullivan and Lawton) that decides which school a child attends is Howell Street. Anyone who lives on the south side of Howell Street attends Sullivan, while anyone who lives on the north attends Lawton.

Wissinoming's neighborhood middle school is Harding Middle School located on Torresdale Avenue in the Frankford section of Philadelphia.

Frankford High School is Wissinoming's neighborhood high school, located on Oxford Avenue and Wakeling Street.

== Parks ==
Wissinoming is widely known for its large park, Wissinoming Park. With entrances at Charles Street and Comly Street, Charles Street and Cheltenham Avenue, and Frankford Avenue and Comly Street.

Wissinoming has two playgrounds: Moss Playground (home of the Moss Eagles and located on Torresdale Avenue and Cheltenham Avenue) and American Legion (also known as Devereaux by natives of the neighborhood since it is located on Torresdale Avenue and Devereaux Street).

== Police ==
Philadelphia's 15th Police District (located roughly at Levick Street and Harbison Avenue) covers Wissinoming.
