= Jay Cooke Junior High School =

- U.S. National Register of Historic Places
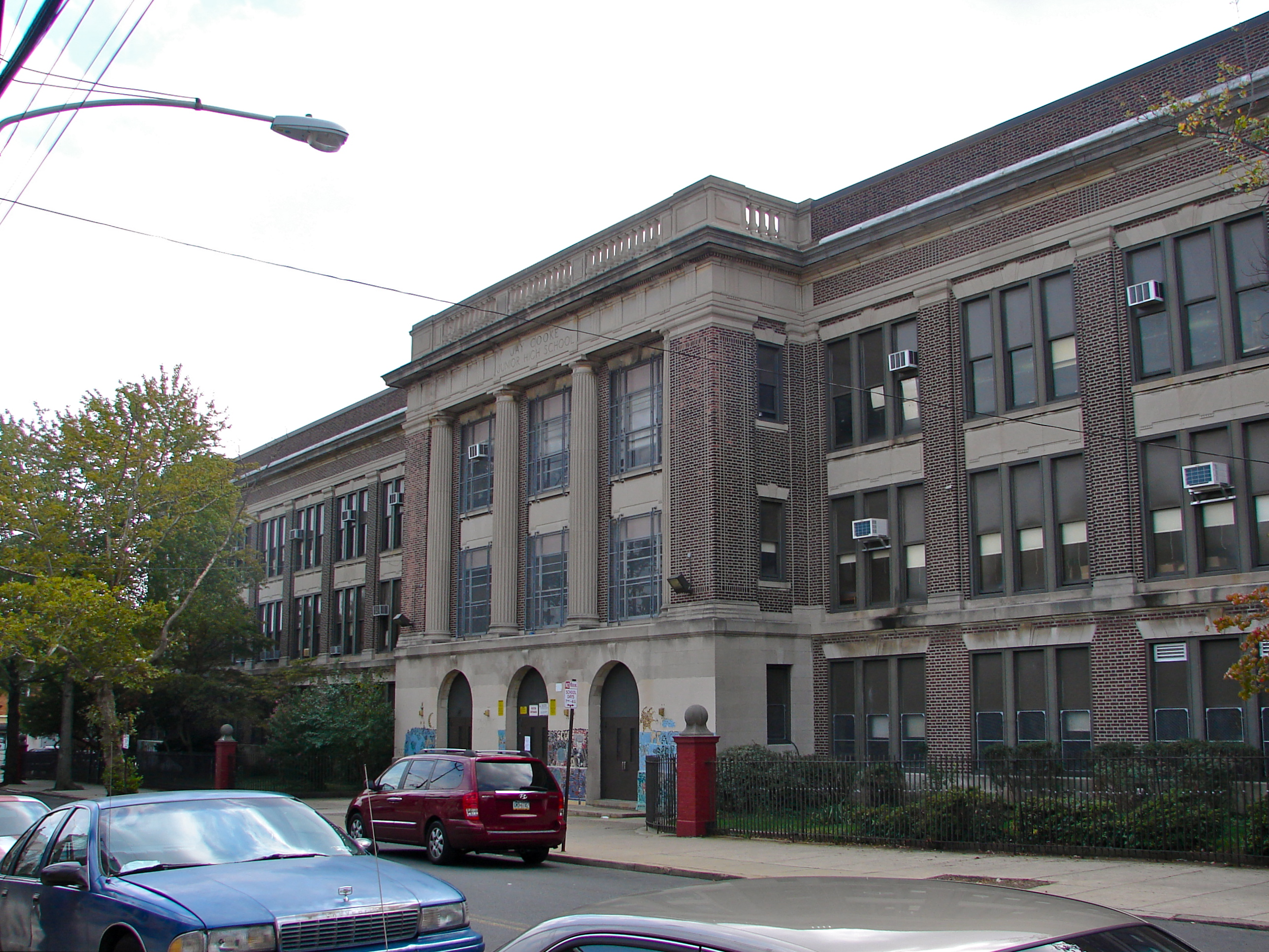
- Jay Cooke Junior High School, September 2010

- Location within Philadelphia Location within Pennsylvania Location within the United States
- Location: 4735 Old York Rd., Philadelphia, Pennsylvania
- Coordinates: 40°01′32″N 75°08′46″W
- Area: 1.7 acres (0.69 ha)
- Built: 1922-1924
- Architect: Irwin T. Catharine
- Architectural style: Colonial Revival
- MPS: Philadelphia Public Schools TR
- NRHP reference No.: 88002259
- Added to NRHP: November 18, 1988

Jay Cooke Junior High School is an historic junior high school building in the Logan neighborhood of Philadelphia, Pennsylvania, United States.

Added to the National Register of Historic Places in 1988, it was named for financier Jay Cooke (1821-1905).

== History and architectural features ==
Designed by Irwin T. Catharine, this historic structure was built between 1922 and 1924. It is a three-story, seventeen-bay, brick building that sits on a raised basement. Designed in the Colonial Revival-style, it features a projecting center entrance pavilion, stone pilasters, arched entrance openings, and a brick parapet.
