= Logan station =

Rapid transit station in Philadelphia

Logan
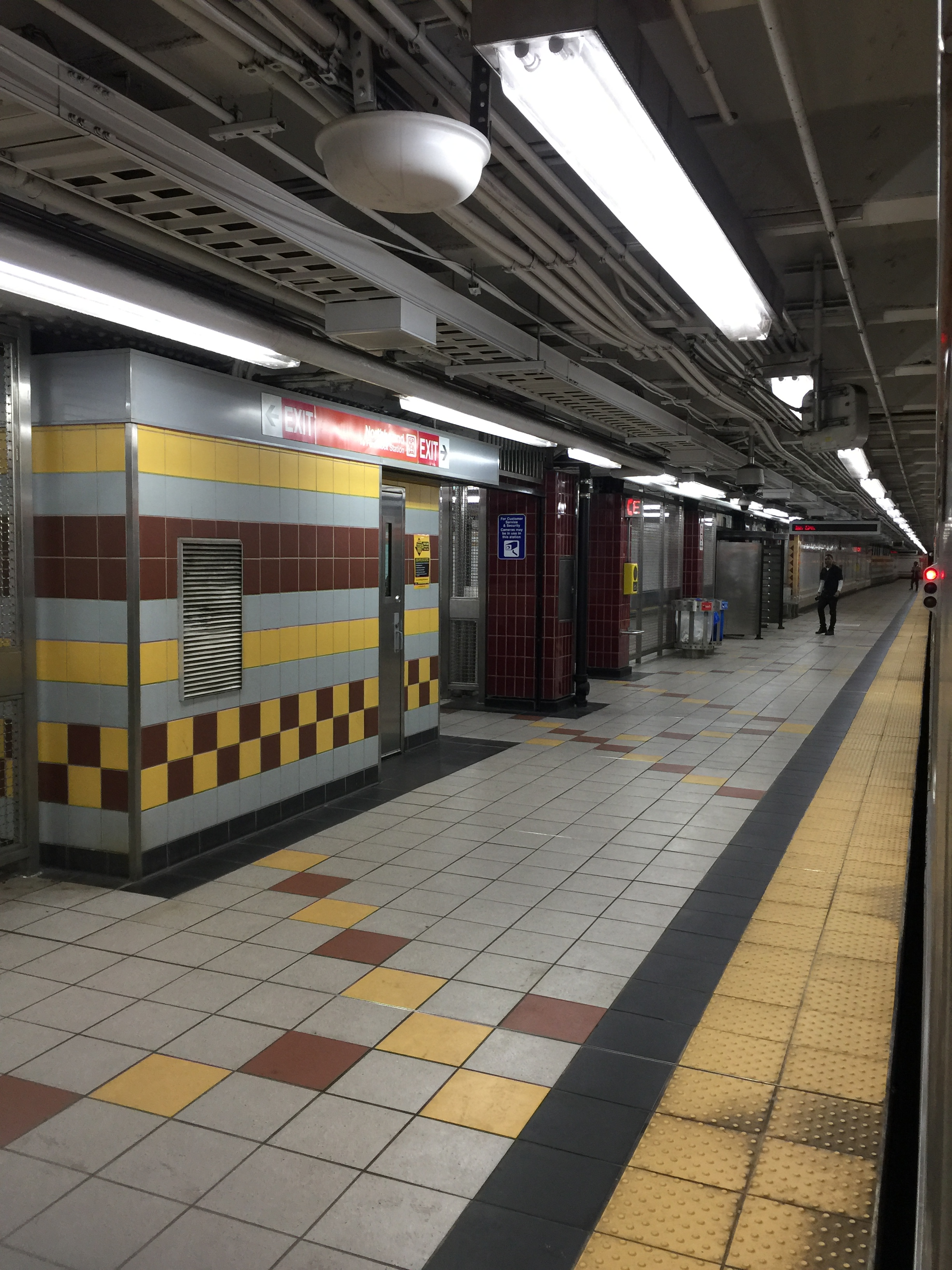
- Logan station platform

General information
- Location: 5100 North Broad Street; Philadelphia, Pennsylvania
- Coordinates: 40.0307°N 75.1465°W
- Owner: City of Philadelphia
- Operator: SEPTA
- Platforms: 2 side platforms
- Tracks: 4
- Connections: SEPTA City Bus: 16, 41

Construction
- Structure type: Underground
- Accessible: No, planned

History
- Opened: September 1, 1928

Services
Preceding station	SEPTA Metro	Following station
Wyoming toward NRG Station	B (SEPTA Metro)	Olney T.C. toward Fern Rock T.C.
and do not stop here
Location

Logan station is a SEPTA Metro subway stop on the B1 in the Logan neighborhood of North Philadelphia, Pennsylvania. It is located at 5100 North Broad Street at Lindley Avenue. This is a local station, and thus has four tracks, with only the outer two being served. There are separate fare control areas for the northbound and southbound platforms, and no crossover exists.

Logan station is located on Broad Street beneath a bridge for what is today the SEPTA Main Line that carries the Fox Chase, Lansdale/Doylestown, Warminster, and West Trenton Line. No connection to any of these railroad lines exists at this station.

== Gallery ==
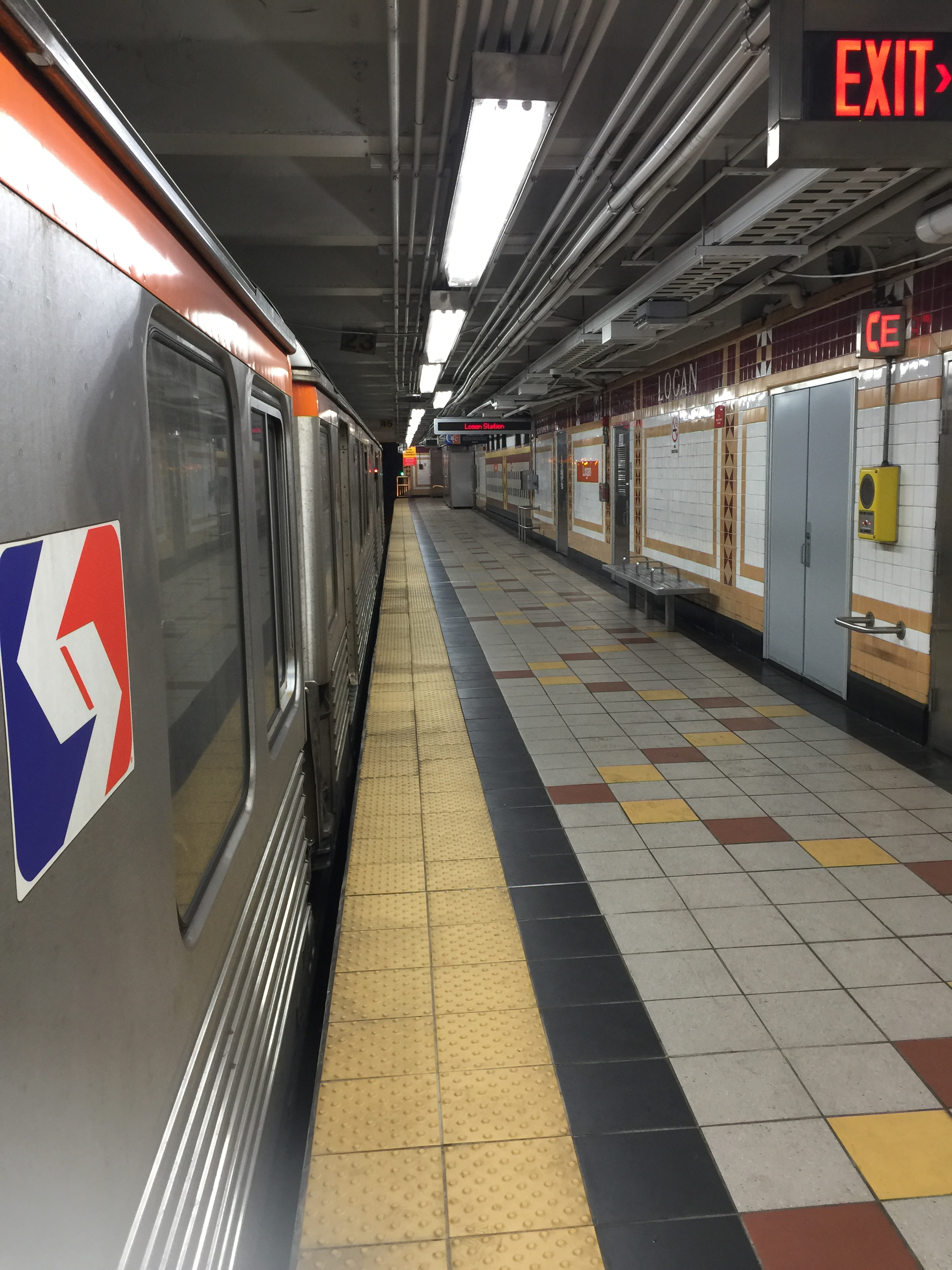
Station platform 2018

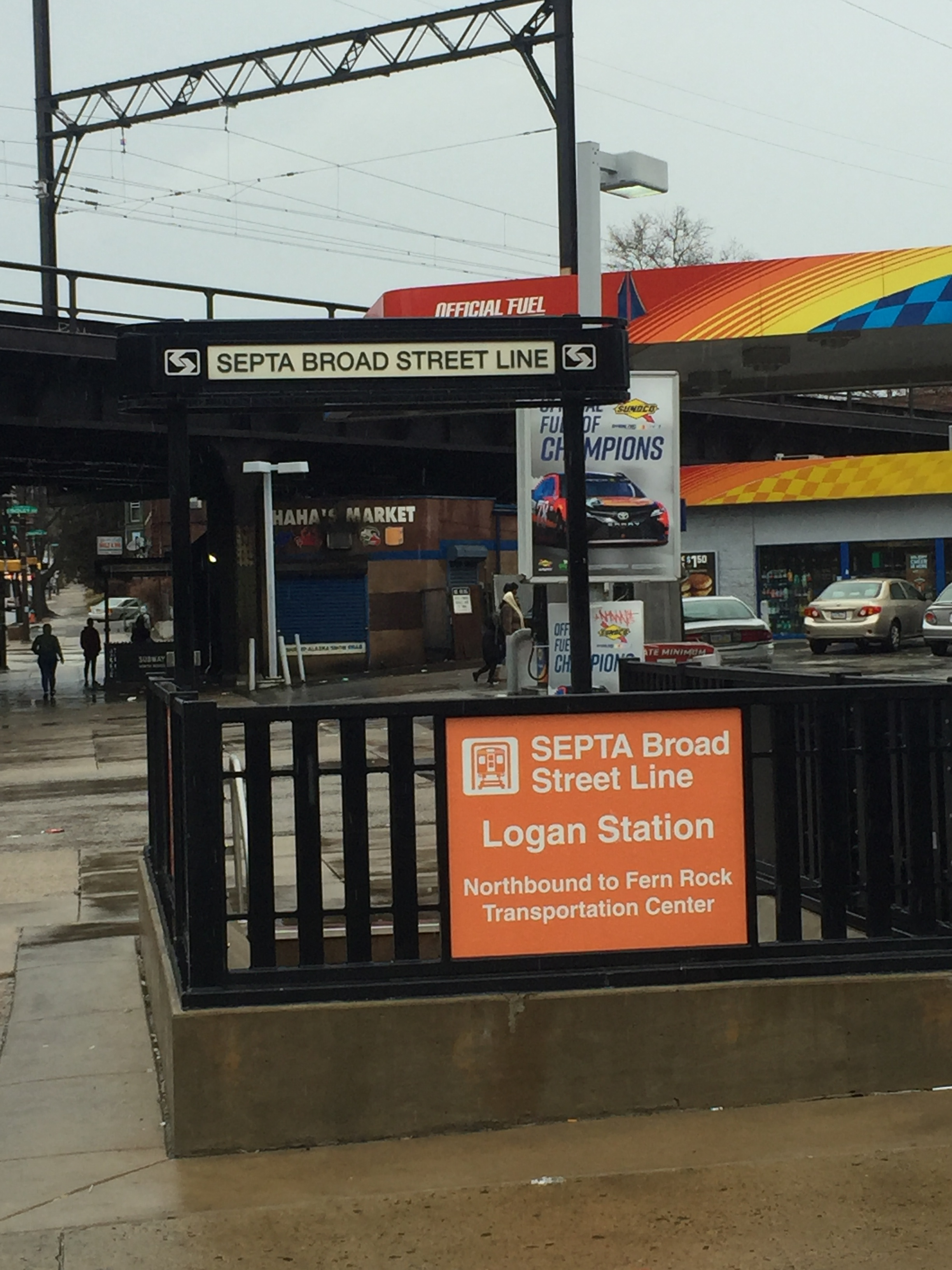
Station entrance

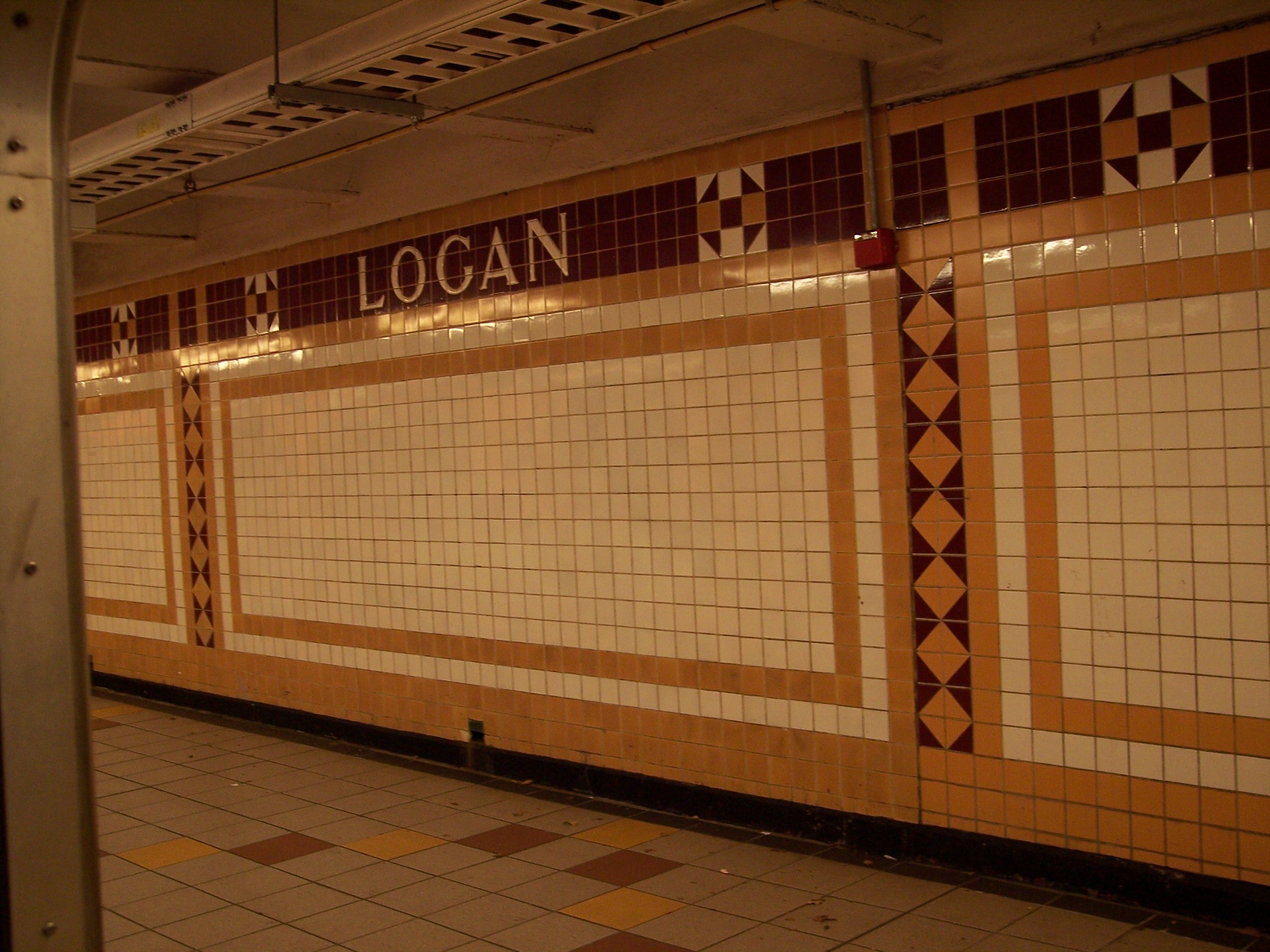
Logan Station platform

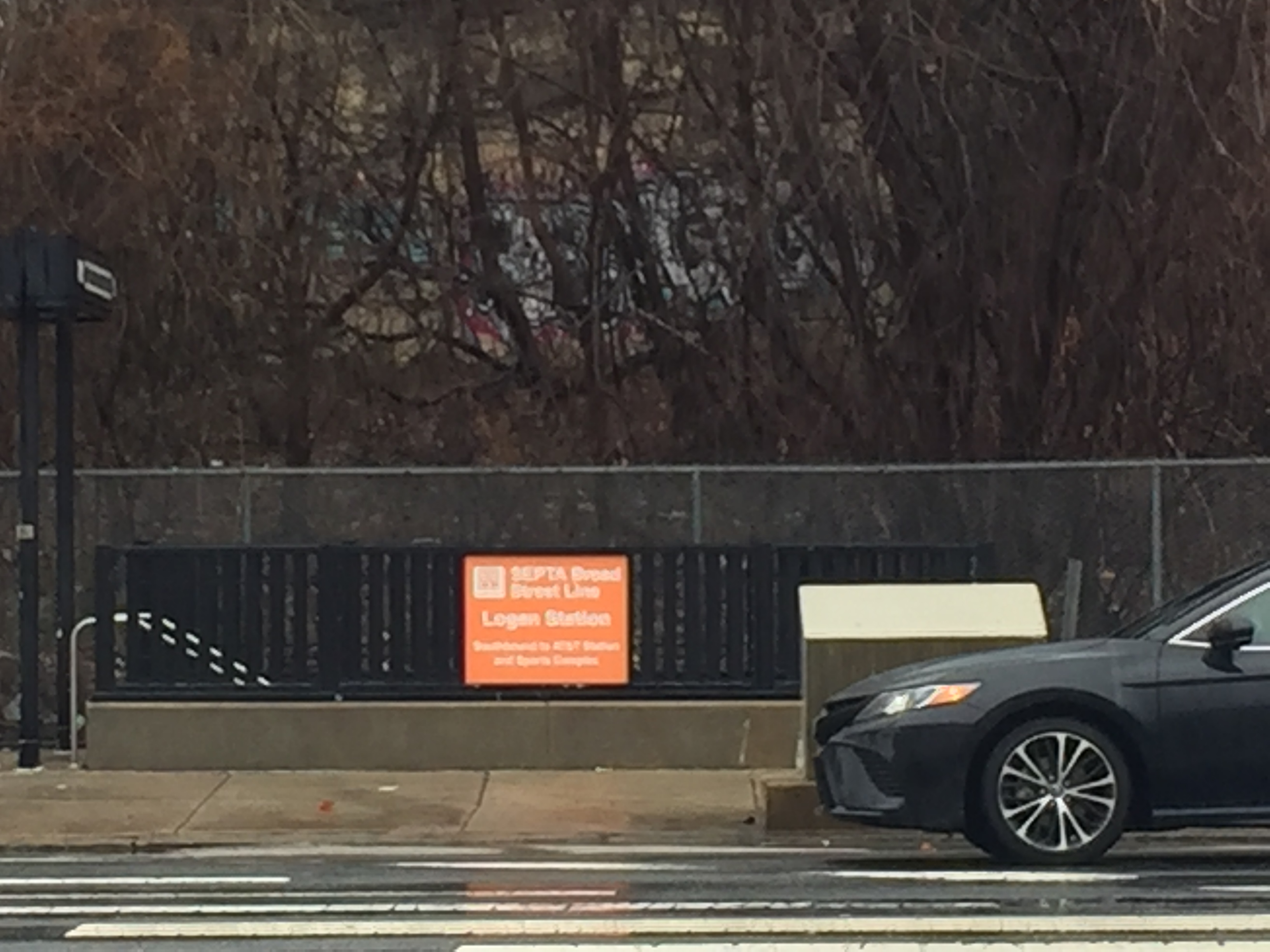
Logan Station entrance
