= Olney, Philadelphia =

Olney
- Neighborhood of Philadelphia
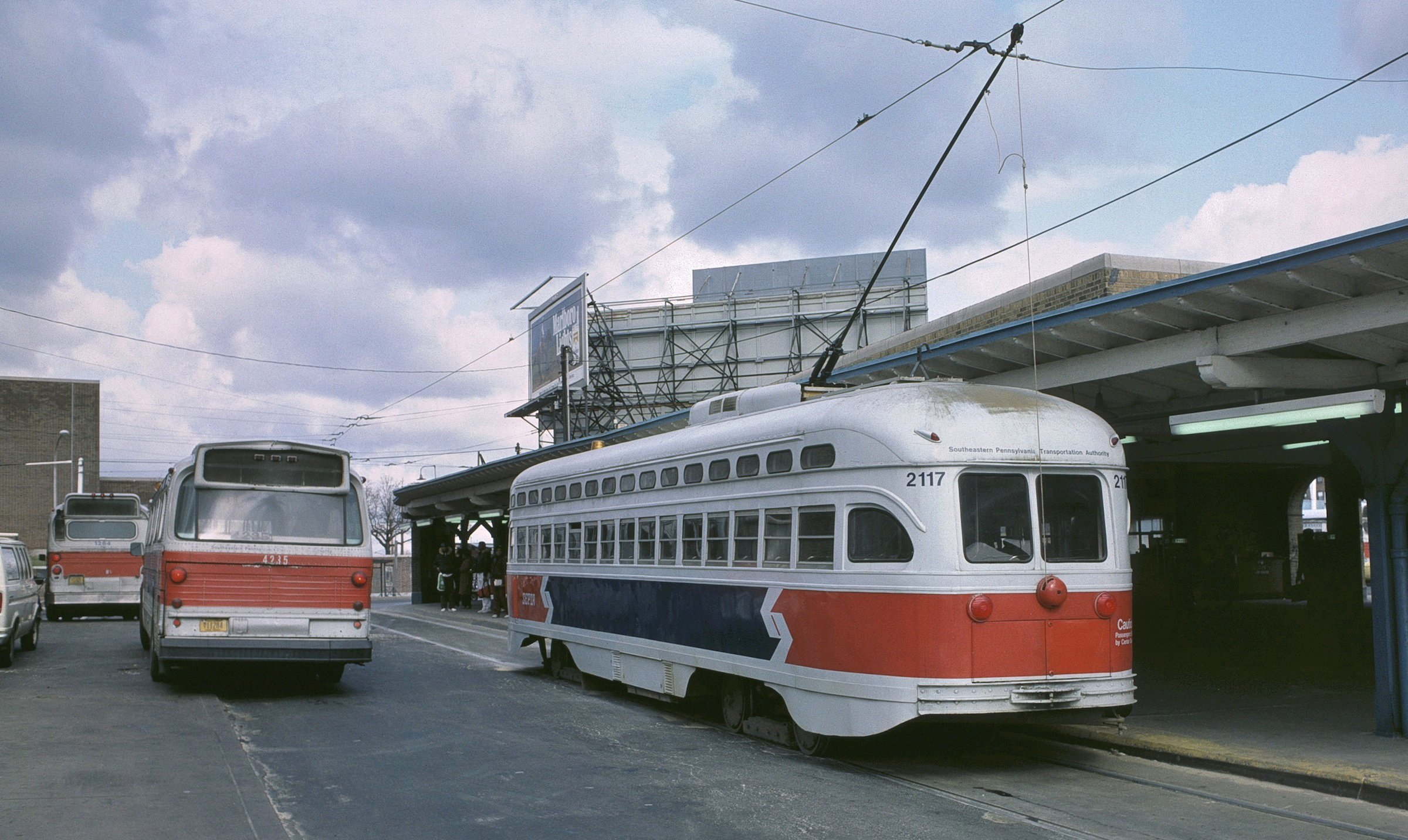
- Olney Transportation Center in 1984

- Location within Philadelphia
- Country: United States
- State: Pennsylvania
- County: Philadelphia
- City: Philadelphia
- Area codes: 215, 267, and 445

Olney (/ˈɒlni/ or locally /ˈɒləni/) is a neighborhood in the North Philadelphia section of Philadelphia. It is roughly bounded by the Feltonville neighborhood to the south, Lawncrest to the east, East Oak Lane, to the north, and Logan to the West. Portions of the neighborhood do serve as major commercial centers for many surrounding groups. At 5th Street and Olney Avenue, there is a Korean-American business district, and Hispanic businesses are located in southern Olney.

Fisher Park is located in Olney. It is a 23-acre (93,000 m^{2}) public park which was laid out and owned by Joseph Wharton, founder of Swarthmore College and the Wharton School at the University of Pennsylvania. It was donated to the City of Philadelphia by Joseph in 1908 as a "Christmas gift" to Philadelphia. Fisher Park has a football field, basketball and tennis courts, and a wooded hiking area.

Olney is named after the estate of Alexander Wilson (not the ornithologist), who resided on Rising Sun Avenue, near Tacony Creek. Wilson chose the name for his residence because of his love for the poet William Cowper, of Olney, England. The mansion was demolished in 1924, but the name was applied to the growing village nearby.

== History ==
=== 19th century ===
Until the late 19th century, Olney was a vast, hilly farmland in the hinterland of Philadelphia County. Olney residents then included mainly farmers and wealthy Philadelphians who could afford to live away from the city. As Philadelphia grew northwards, however, the area became more urbanized. People seeking to escape the growing population density towards the center moved to Olney.

Soon thereafter, businesses began appearing, largely centered at 5th Street and Olney Avenue. Industry was also attracted and companies such as Heintz Manufacturing Company, Proctor and Schwartz, and Brown Instrument Division built factories in the neighborhood. But this took second place to the strong commercial district, led by the Olney Businessmans' Association.

The population grew even more after the construction of the Broad Street subway, whose original terminal was at the Olney Transportation Center. It promised to get riders from Olney to Philadelphia City Hall in less than twenty minutes for fifteen cents. In addition to trolley lines that traveled east and west, this made Olney Philadelphia's northern transportation hub and gave Olneyites easy access to the entire city and beyond.

=== 20th century ===
In 1925, Colney Theatre was constructed which then had the largest one-floor seating capacity in the world with room for almost 2000 people. In 1931, Olney High School graduated its first class and for a time had the largest enrollment in the city with 3600 students. Olney High School's alumni include Philadelphia Phillies outfielder Del Ennis (1942).

Olneyites lobbied the city intensely for the constructions of playgrounds and the library at 5th Street and Tabor Road. Community members put together an amateur Olney Symphony Orchestra (which continues to give concerts) and started their own newspaper, the Olney Times (which is no longer in circulation as of 2010).

Portuguese immigrants between the 1970s through the 1990s heavily impacted a section of North 5th street, primarily between Lindley Avenue and West Rockland Street. Affectionately known as Rua Cinco (5th Street), it was common to hear people speaking Portuguese on the street and in stores. It was the area to find a Portuguese-speaking tailor, insurance agent, lawyer, travel agent or real estate agent.

In 1987, the area boasted a Portuguese Businesses Association, five Portuguese travel agencies, three grocery stores, including Caravela and Girassol, two real estate offices, an insurance office, an electric-appliance store, a gift shop, a furniture store, bars, a bakery, cafe, and two major restaurants, Berlengas Island Restaurant, Cafe Portugal, Not far from Rua Cinco was also the Philadelphia Portuguese Club, founded in 1935 that at the time had an estimated 700 members.

Between the 1960s and 1980s, Olney began experiencing demographic change, as European-American residents moved out of the neighborhood in a process sometimes described as "white flight". As part of the deindustrialization of Philadelphia, industry closed factories and moved from the area. During this time there was an increase in crime in Olney.

The receding population was quickly supplemented by a new wave of residents, including African Americans from elsewhere in the city, and immigrants from Asia (Korea, mainly, as well as Vietnam, China, Cambodia and Laos) and Latin America (Puerto Rico, Colombia, Mexico, Cuba and Dominican Republic). This new population quickly filled the vacancies left behind in the commercial district. These groups created organizations such as the Korean Community Development Services Center.

By the mid-1980s, Koreans began moving out of Logan and into Olney and other communities. By 1986 up to 5,000 Koreans lived in Olney, and many Korean businesses were situated along North Fifth Street. Many Korean area residents referred to the area as "Koreatown."

The Olney station of the Broad Street subway, while no longer the terminal, is the second-most used after City Hall. There are thriving business districts at 5th and Olney, Broad and Olney, and Front and Olney.

The Adams Avenue Bridge was listed on the National Register of Historic Places in 1988.

== Education ==
=== Public schools ===
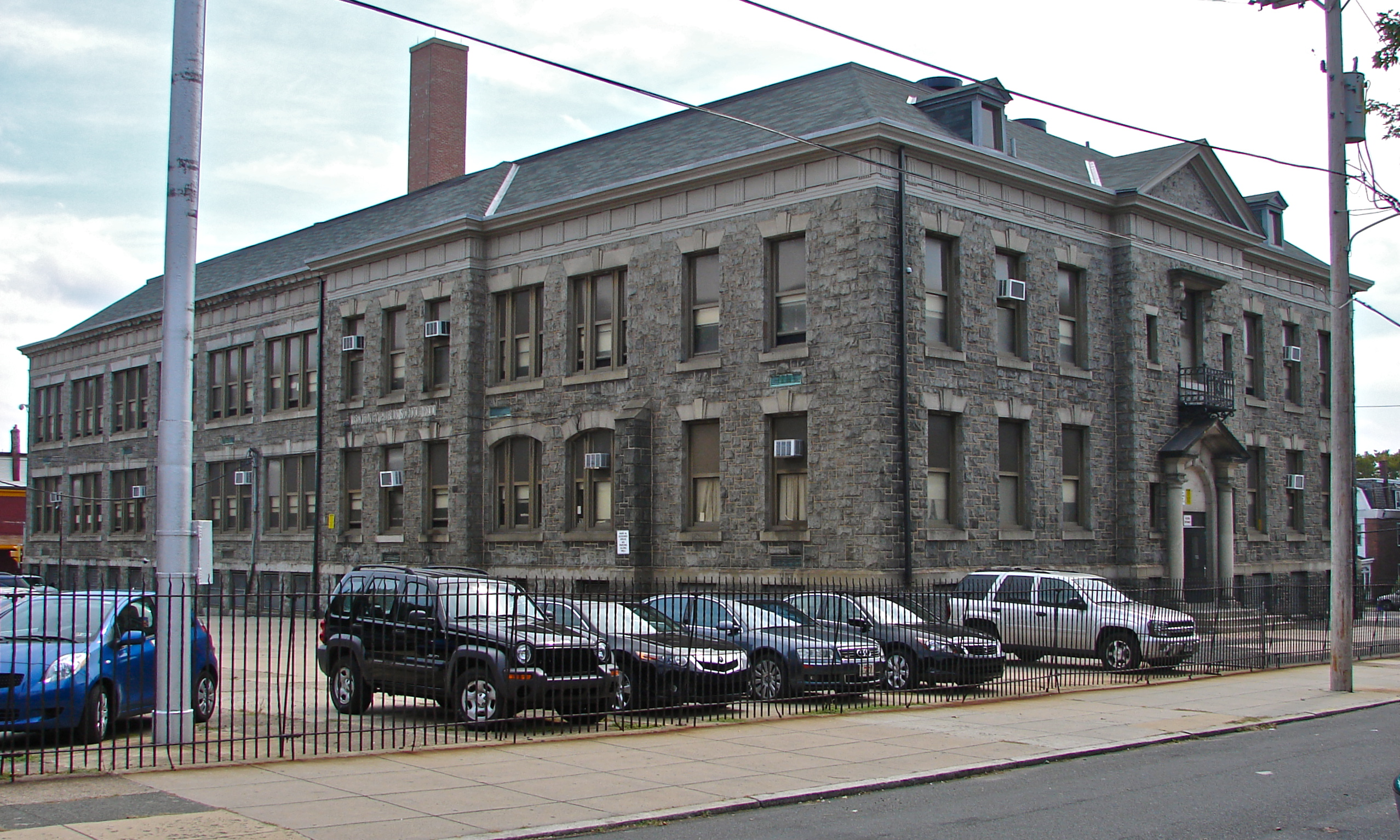
Olney Elementary School in September 2010

Like all sections of Philadelphia, Olney is zoned to the School District of Philadelphia.

Olney has two public high schools: Olney High School is located in southern Olney, and Samuel Fels High School, located in northern Olney, is now accepting students after violence at Olney High School became too prevalent.

Central High School, the Philadelphia High School for Girls, and The Widener Memorial School are each located in Logan (not Logan Square) neighborhood of the city, bordering Olney.

Olney has six public elementary schools:

- Lowell
- Finletter
- Morrison
- Grover Washington, Jr.
- Marshall
- Olney

=== Private schools ===
Private elementary schools include Saint Helena-Incarnation Regional Elementary School, Incarnation Catholic School & Saint Helena, and Olney Christian School, which opened in September 2012.

=== Public libraries ===
The Free Library of Philadelphia maintains the Greater Olney Branch in Olney.

=== Higher education ===
La Salle University borders Olney and the Nicetown–Tioga and Germantown sections of the city.

== Demographics ==
Olney was originally settled by German Americans, and maintained an homogeneous population throughout the first half of the 20th century. Today, Olney is one of the most diverse neighborhoods in Philadelphia, with the 2nd largest Mexican population only behind South Philadelphia. It is also home to large Colombians, Salvadorans, Guatemalans, Cambodians, African Americans, Koreans, Sub-Saharan Africans, West Indians, Hispanics, and Arab Americans communities as well as other smaller groups representing other nationalities and ethnic groups.

As of the census of 2010, the racial makeup of Olney was 49.5% African American, 26.3% Hispanic or Latino, 13.9% Asian, 6.9% White, and roughly 3% Multiracial.

After growing modestly during the 1990s, the population of Olney decreased by 2.3% between 2000 and 2010 (from 37,366 to 36,474). Olney is located in the 19120 postal zip code, which it shares with Feltonville and Lawncrest. Its geographical coordinates are 40.034254 degrees North and 75.121256 degrees West.

In 2005, the median home sale price in the 19120 zip code was $79,950. This was an increase of 20% over the median price for 2004.

== In popular culture ==
- Most of M. K. Asante's bestselling memoir Buck: A Memoir takes place in Olney.

== Notable people ==
- Clair Blank, novelist

== See also ==
- Olney Transportation Center
