= SEPTA Route 6 =

Public transport route in Philadelphia, Pennsylvania

Route 6 Via Ogontz Avenue
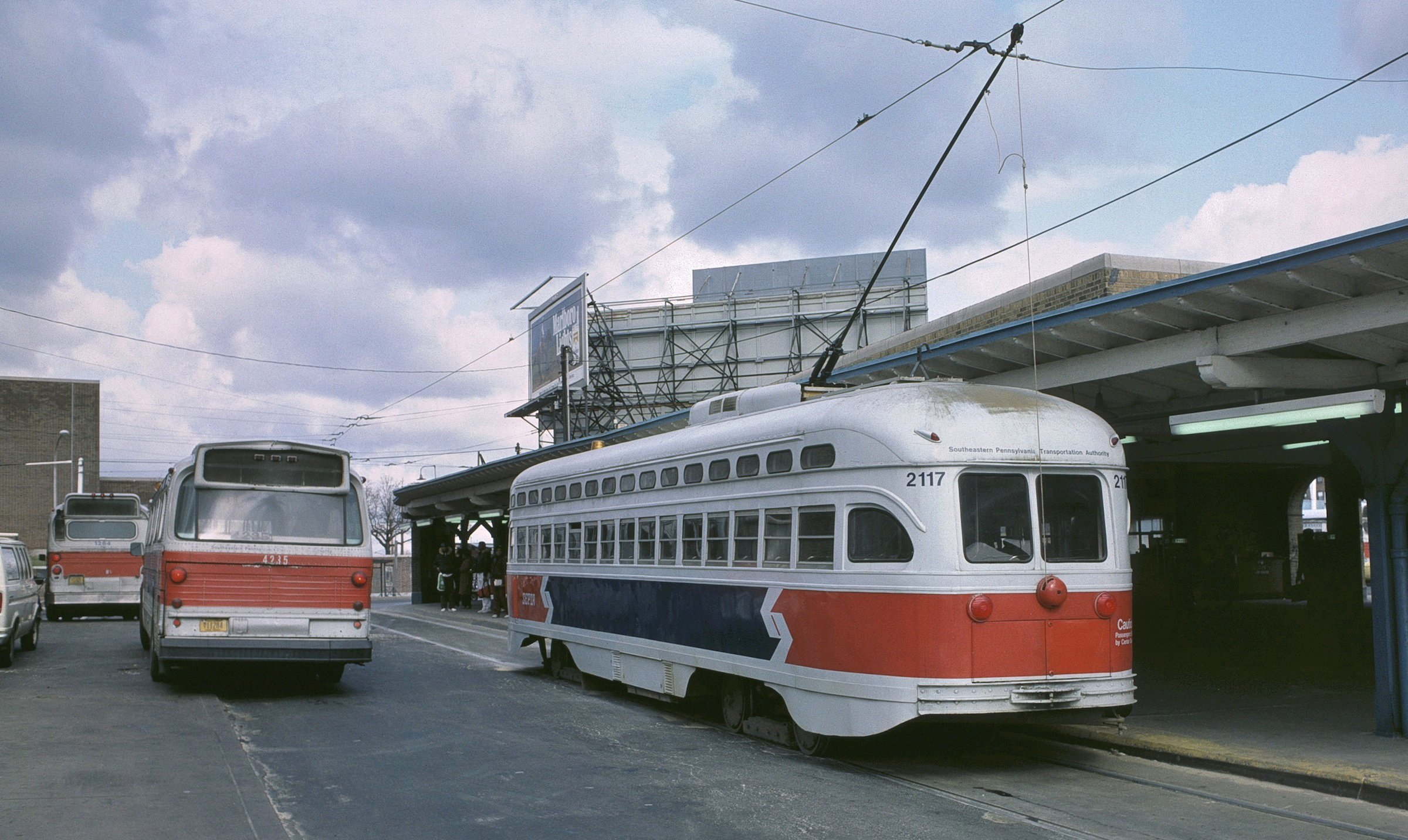
- 1948 All-Electric PCC 2117 awaiting departure on former Surface Streetcar Trolley Route 6 at Olney Transportation Center in 1984

Overview
- Operator: SEPTA
- Garage: Luzerne Depot
- Vehicle: PCC streetcar (to 1986), bus
- Began service: 1907 or 1924
- Ended service: January 11-12, 1986 overnight (streetcar)

Route
- Locale: North Philadelphia to Willow Grove, Pennsylvania
- Communities served: Olney, West Oak Lane, Germantown, Ogontz, Cheltenham Township, Willow Grove
- Start: Olney Transportation Center
- Via: Ogontz Avenue
- End: Willow Grove Amusement Park; Cheltenham & Ogontz Avenues Loop
- Length: 2.9 miles (4.7 km)

Service
- Ridership: 1,783,200 (FY2019)

Route 6, also known as the Ogontz Avenue Line, is a former streetcar line and current bus route, operated by SEPTA in Philadelphia, Pennsylvania.

== Route description ==
Route 6 begins at the Olney Transportation Center, a core station of the Broad Street Line, principally traversing Ogontz Avenue in Philadelphia, crossing the City Line at Cheltenham Avenue, and then proceeding on private right-of-way down the middle of Limekiln Pike before running as a streetcar line on Keswick Avenue in Glenside, and then mostly side-of-the-road private right-of-way until reaching Willow Grove Park. The line was fully double-tracked. Streetcar service to Willow Grove Park ended on June 8, 1958, when the Pennsylvania Highway Department (predecessor to the Pennsylvania Department of Transportation) acquired portions of the private right-of-way on Limekiln Pike for construction of the soon to be built Pennsylvania Route 309 Expressway. PCC streetcars were assigned to Route 6 beginning June 20, 1948. Route 6 was cut back to a loop and terminus at Ogontz & Cheltenham Avenues at the City Line. Starting on September 30, 1968, Route 6 streetcar service was transferred the new transit authority, SEPTA, and buses replaced Route 6 service on January 12, 1986.

== History ==
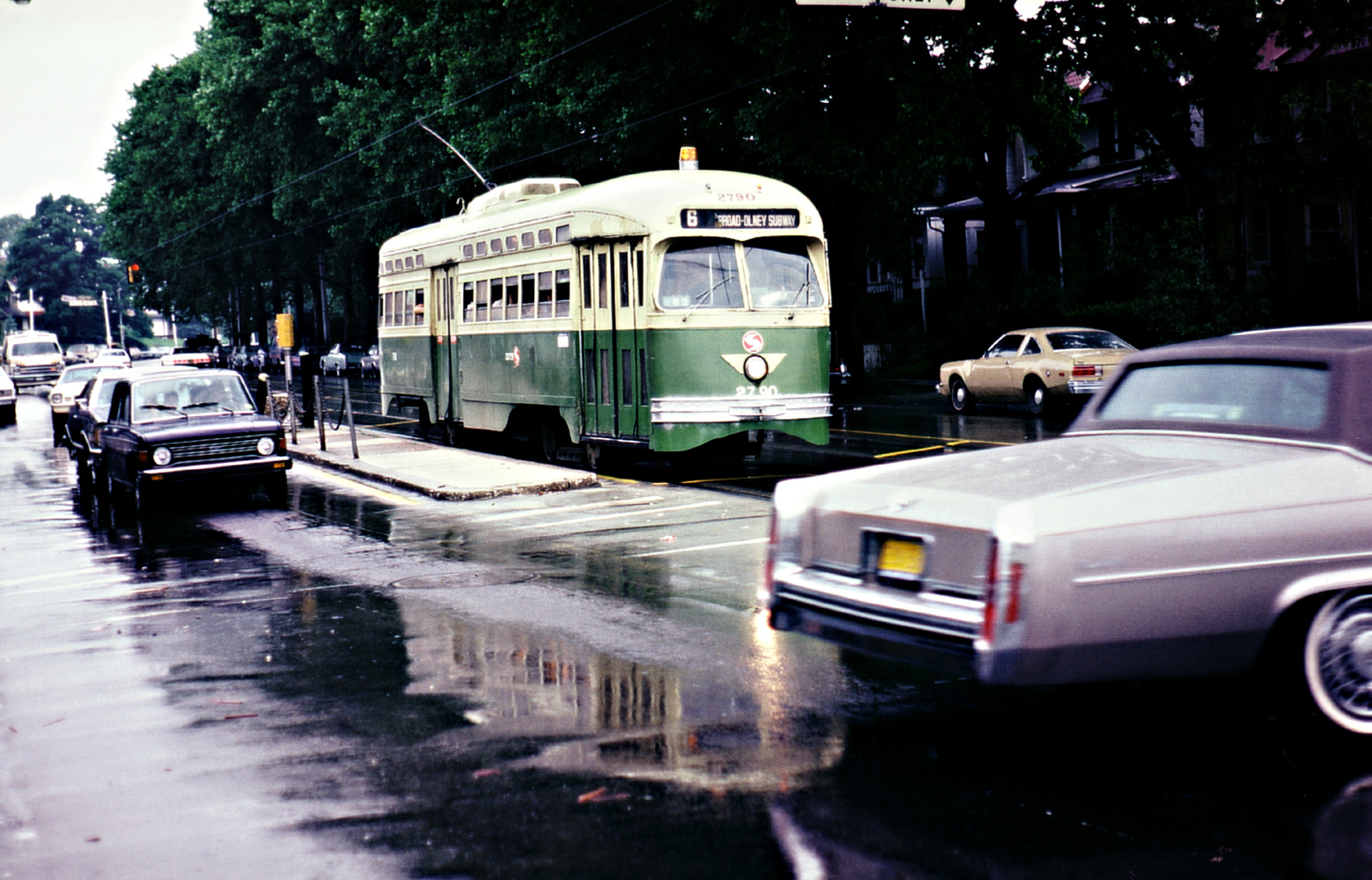
The Route 6 trolley, c. 1970s

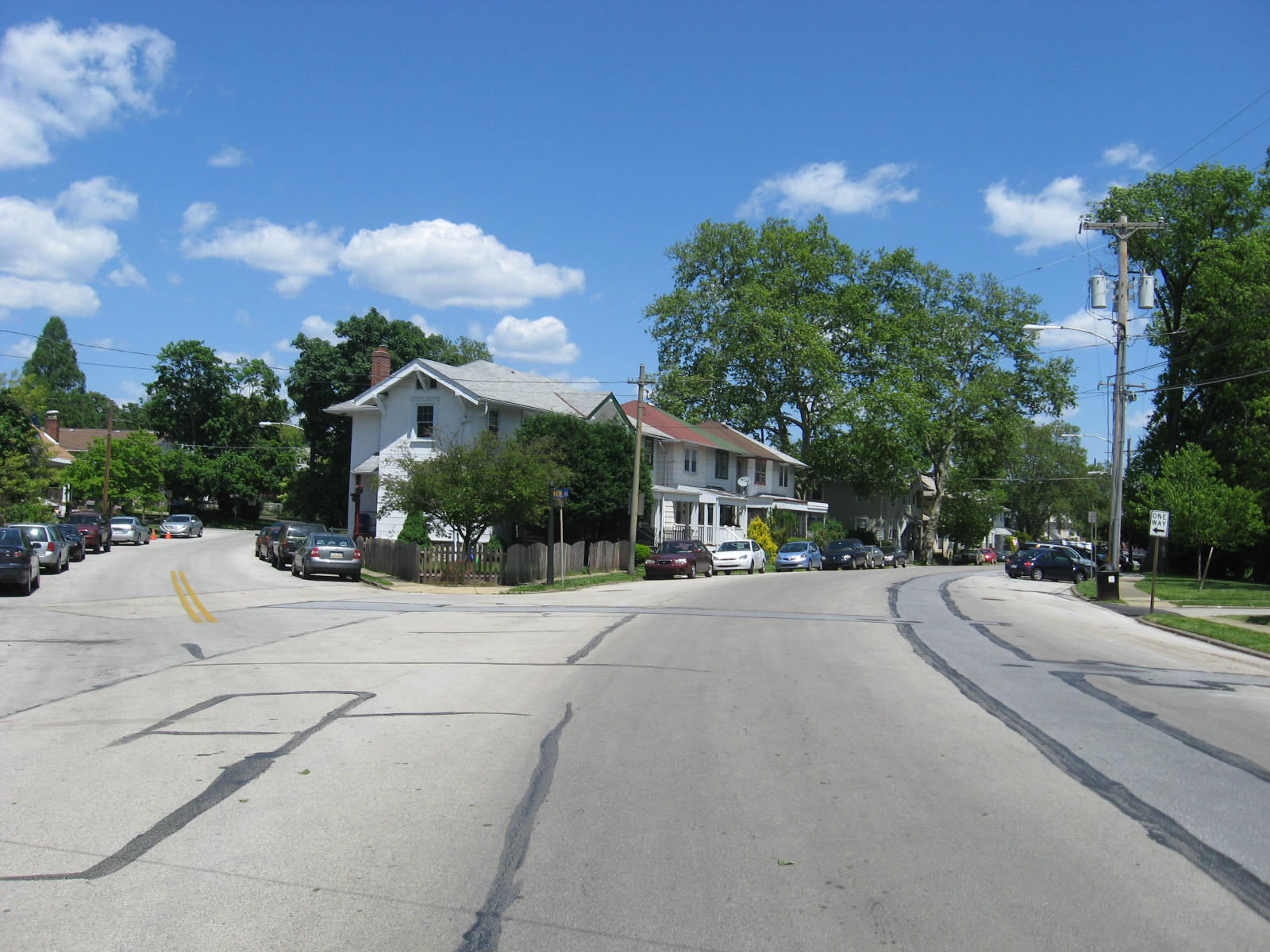
The route in Cheltenham Township

As one of the newer trolleys to be adopted by SEPTA, the Route 6 trolley was established by the Philadelphia Rapid Transit Company (PRT) in 1907, although some sources claim it was established in 1924, as the Glenside Line between the Willow Grove Depot and the City Line and Ogontz Avenue via Limekiln Pike. In 1929 the line was extended to Broad Street and Olney Avenue a year after the opening of the Olney Terminal on the Broad Street Line.

This was once a popular trolley line to Willow Grove Amusement Park (current location of the Willow Grove Park Mall). Buses replaced trolleys north of Cheltenham Avenue to Willow Grove on June 8, 1958 (PCC 2134 was the last trolley to Willow Grove). Bus service known as "6 Bus" (See below). The remaining trolley service operated south of Cheltenham & Ogontz Avenues Loop (Cheltenham Square Mall). Despite public criticism by community and transit advocates, SEPTA voted to close the Route 6 trolley line on October 23, 1985. Additionally, the plan involved the closing of the SEPTA Route 50 trolley line along Rising Sun Avenue, although Route 6 trolleys were allowed to remain in service a little longer. Buses replaced the streetcars on the remaining portion of the Route 6 on January 11, 1986, and the Route "6 Bus" renamed Route 22 on the same date to eliminate confusion over the current Route 6.

=== Route 22, the former Route 6 Bus ===
Service on this bus route began on June 8, 1958, as the Route 6 Bus, replacing the truncated Route 6 trolley service to the Willow Grove Amusement Park. New Alternate service via Easton Road was added on September 3, 1961, replacing County Transit Company bus service. Route 6 Bus was extended to Johnsville via Warminster on June 19, 1966, by merging with the Route 74 bus, another former trolley line. Service was rerouted into the new Willow Grove Park Mall on August 1, 1982. Route 6 was redesignated Route 22 on January 12, 1986, with the conversion of the Route 6 Streetcar to bus operations. On September 7, 1997, service was streamlined to operate on the Easton Road and Old York Road routings between Glenside and Warminster. Service along Keswick Avenue and Edge Hill Road, the original trolley route, was eliminated. The right of way of old Route 6 trolley is still visible along Edge Hill Road. A former Route 6 trolley car along this route can be found at the Pennsylvania Trolley Museum in Washington, Pennsylvania.

As of 2008, all buses along both routes are ADA-compliant, and contain bicycle racks. No plans are currently under way to restore the Route 6 line as light-rail service, nor are there such plans for the Route 22 line.
