= Olney Transit Center =

Rapid transit station in Philadelphia

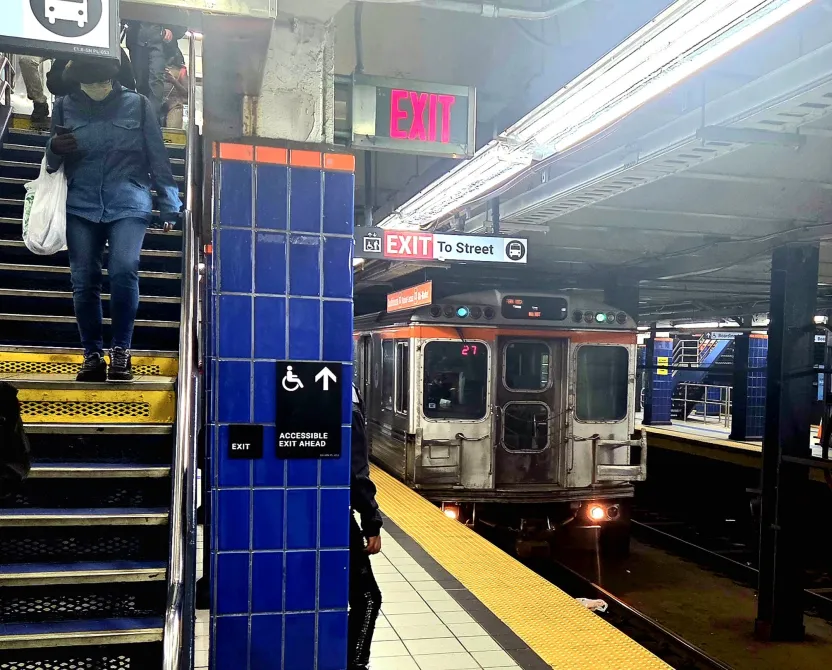
- A southbound B2 Express at Olney in 2026

General information
- Location: 5600 North Broad Street; Philadelphia, Pennsylvania
- Coordinates: 40.0389°N 75.1447°W
- Owner: City of Philadelphia
- Operator: SEPTA
- Platforms: 2 island platforms
- Tracks: 4
- Connections: SEPTA City Bus: 6, 8, 16, 18, 22, 26, 51, 55

Construction
- Structure type: Underground
- Accessible: Yes

History
- Opened: September 1, 1928
- Former names: Olney Transportation Center (1928–2025)

Services
Preceding station	SEPTA Metro	Following station
Logan toward NRG Station	B (SEPTA Metro)	Fern Rock T.C. Terminus
Erie toward Walnut–Locust	B (SEPTA Metro)	Fern Rock T.C. Terminus
Erie toward 8th–Market	B (SEPTA Metro)	Fern Rock T.C. Terminus
Location

Olney Transit Center (formerly the Olney Transportation Center) is a SEPTA bus and subway station in Philadelphia, Pennsylvania. It is located at the intersection of Broad Street and Olney Avenue in the Logan neighborhood of Northwest Philadelphia. It is a major bus terminal as well as the last subway stop on the SEPTA Metro B before the Fern Rock Transit Center terminus.

Olney Transit Center is located near Einstein Medical Center Philadelphia, La Salle University, Central High School, and the Philadelphia High School for Girls. The Olney neighborhood is a short distance east of the center; the center's name derives from Olney Avenue, which runs through both Olney and Logan. It is the second-most-traveled terminal or transportation center in SEPTA's organization.

== History ==
Originally built in 1928, Olney station was the original northern terminus of the Broad Street Line subway until 1956, when it was extended to the Fern Rock Transportation Center. The underground subway station is accessible from both sides of Broad Street, including from the bus terminal on the eastern side of the street, and has a food stand inside it. The bus terminal is outdoors with a roof on top and hosts buses that serve Philadelphia County, Montgomery County, and Bucks County. It also served as a trolley terminal until January 11, 1986, for Ogontz Avenue's Route 6, and was near Sigler Travel, a former Greyhound Lines bus station. Express and local trains both stop at this station. It has two island platforms, one for the two northbound tracks, and one for the two southbound tracks.

=== Incidents ===
Nineteen shootings took place near the station between 2015 and 2021, leaving some riders uncomfortable with using the station. On February 18, 2021, three men injured eight people in a mass shooting at the station.

== Image gallery ==
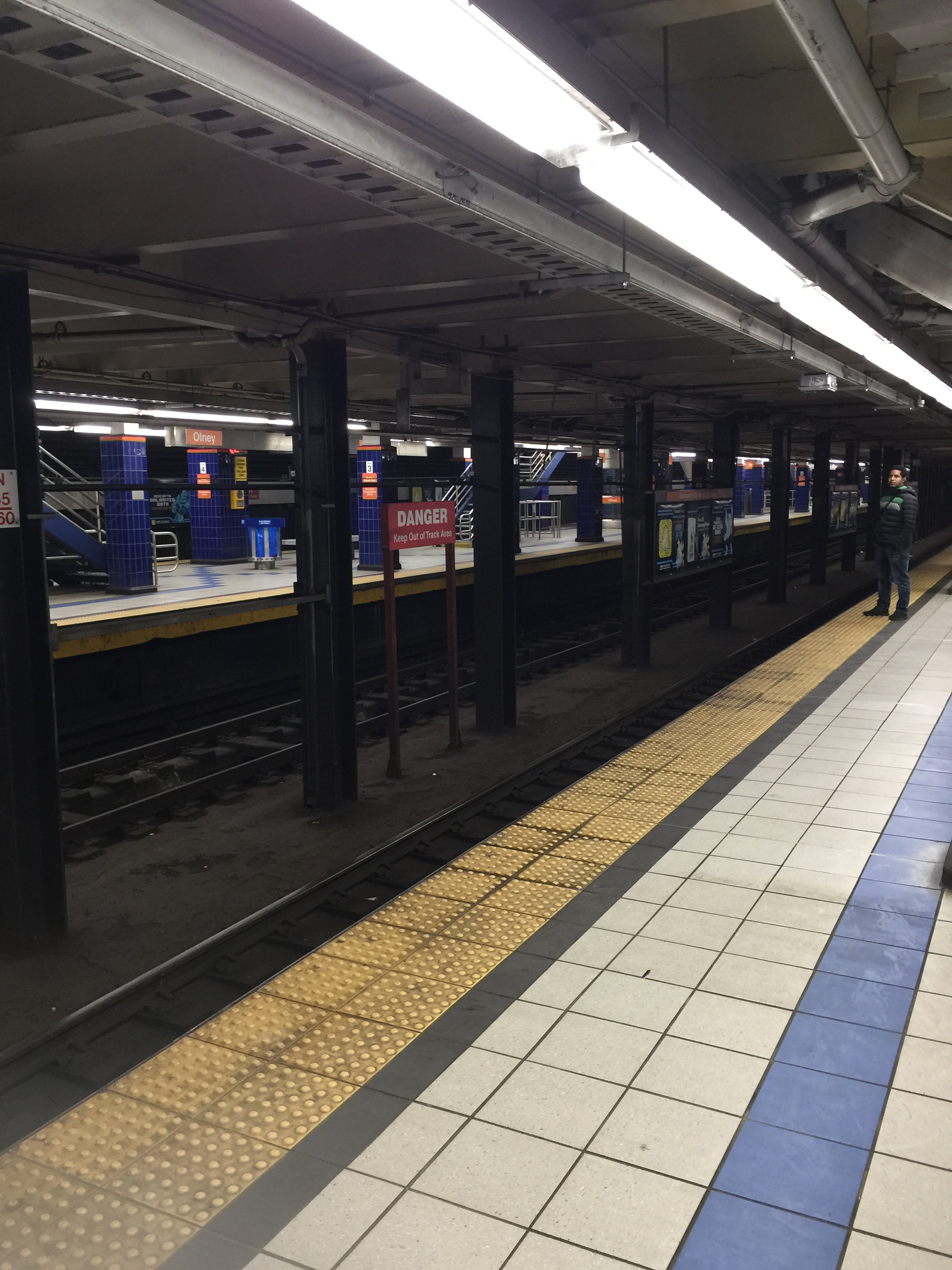
Station platform in 2018

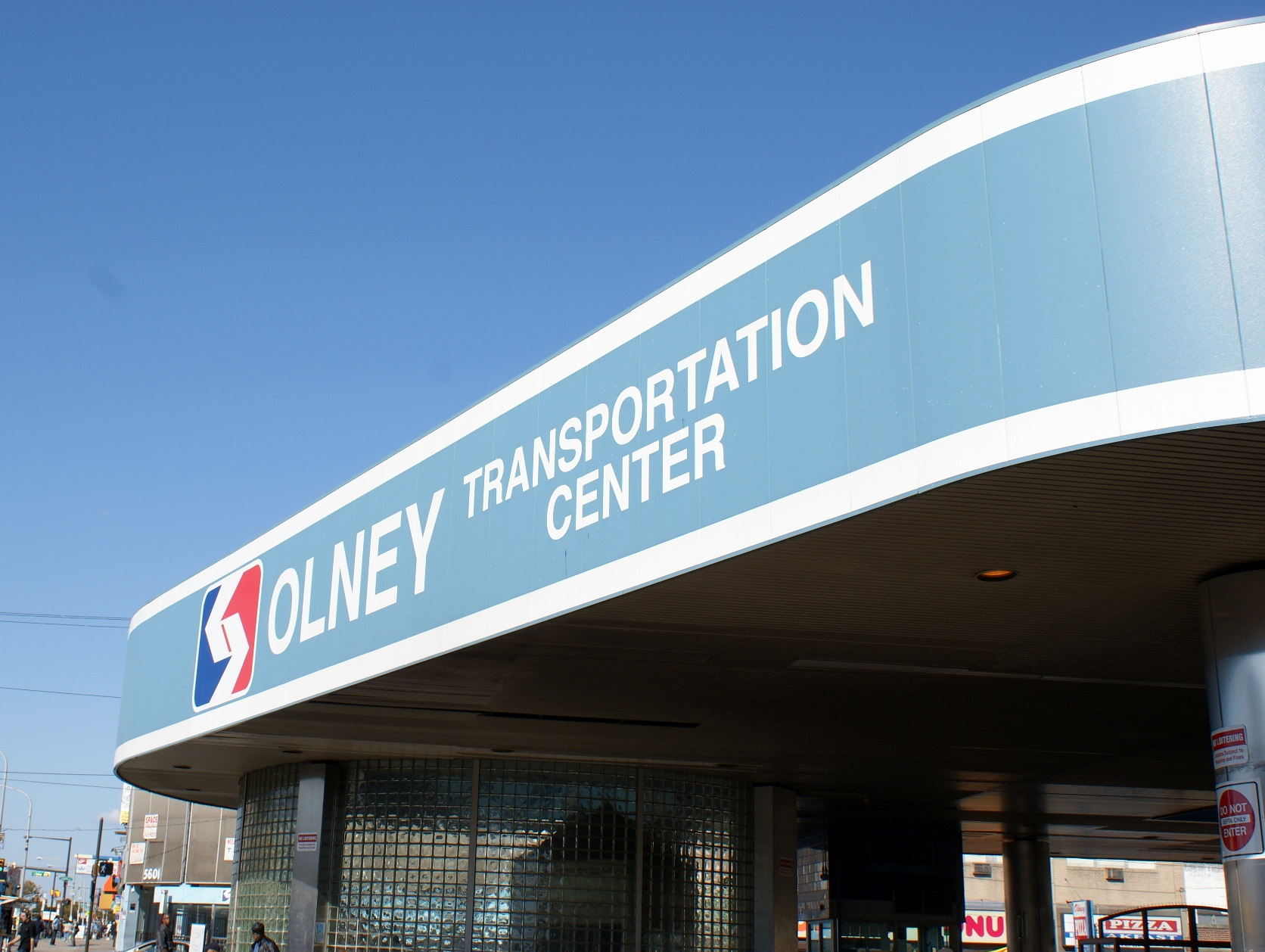
Station building at Olney Transportation Center

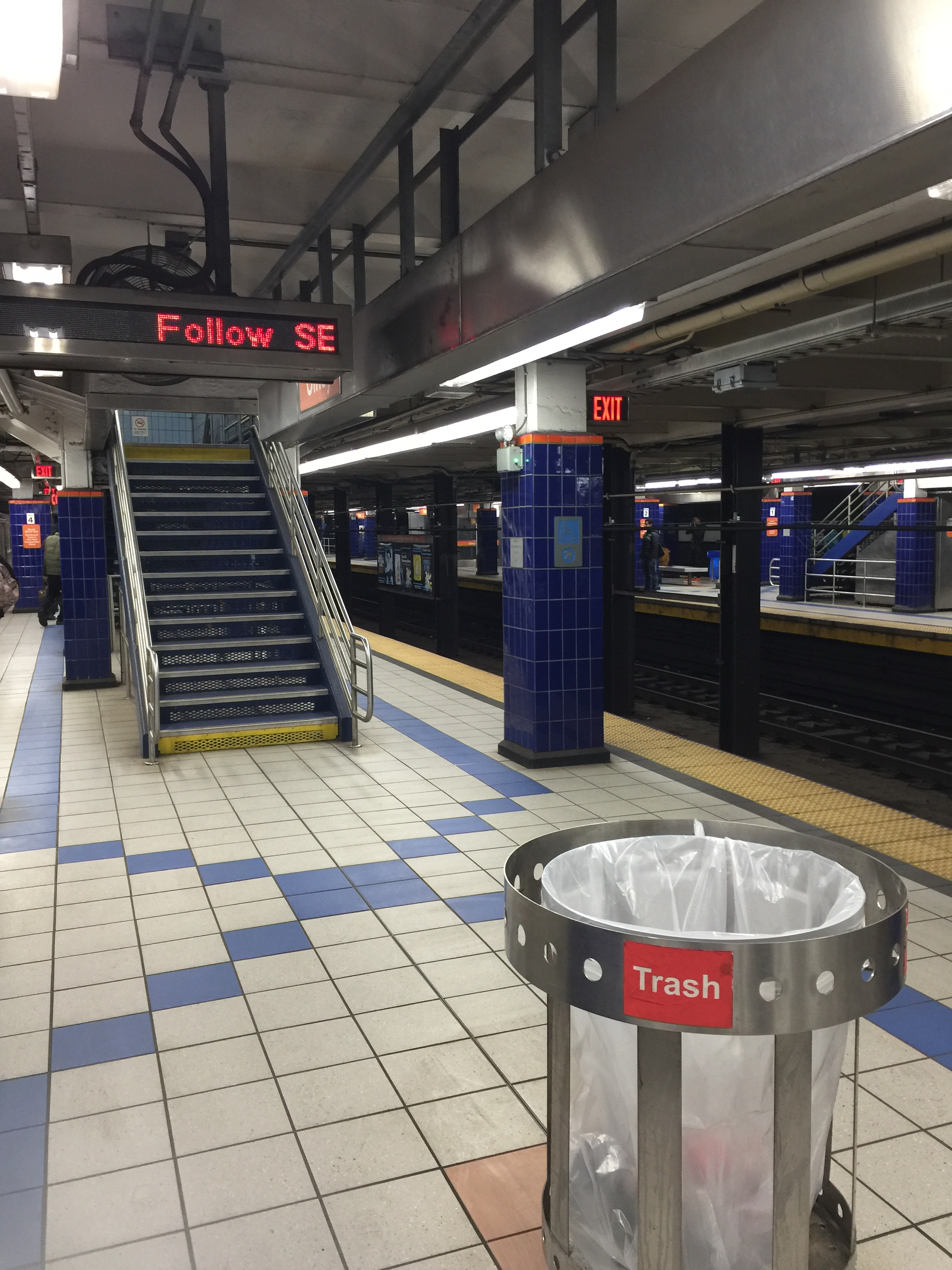
The express tracks and platforms at Olney on the Broad Street Line.

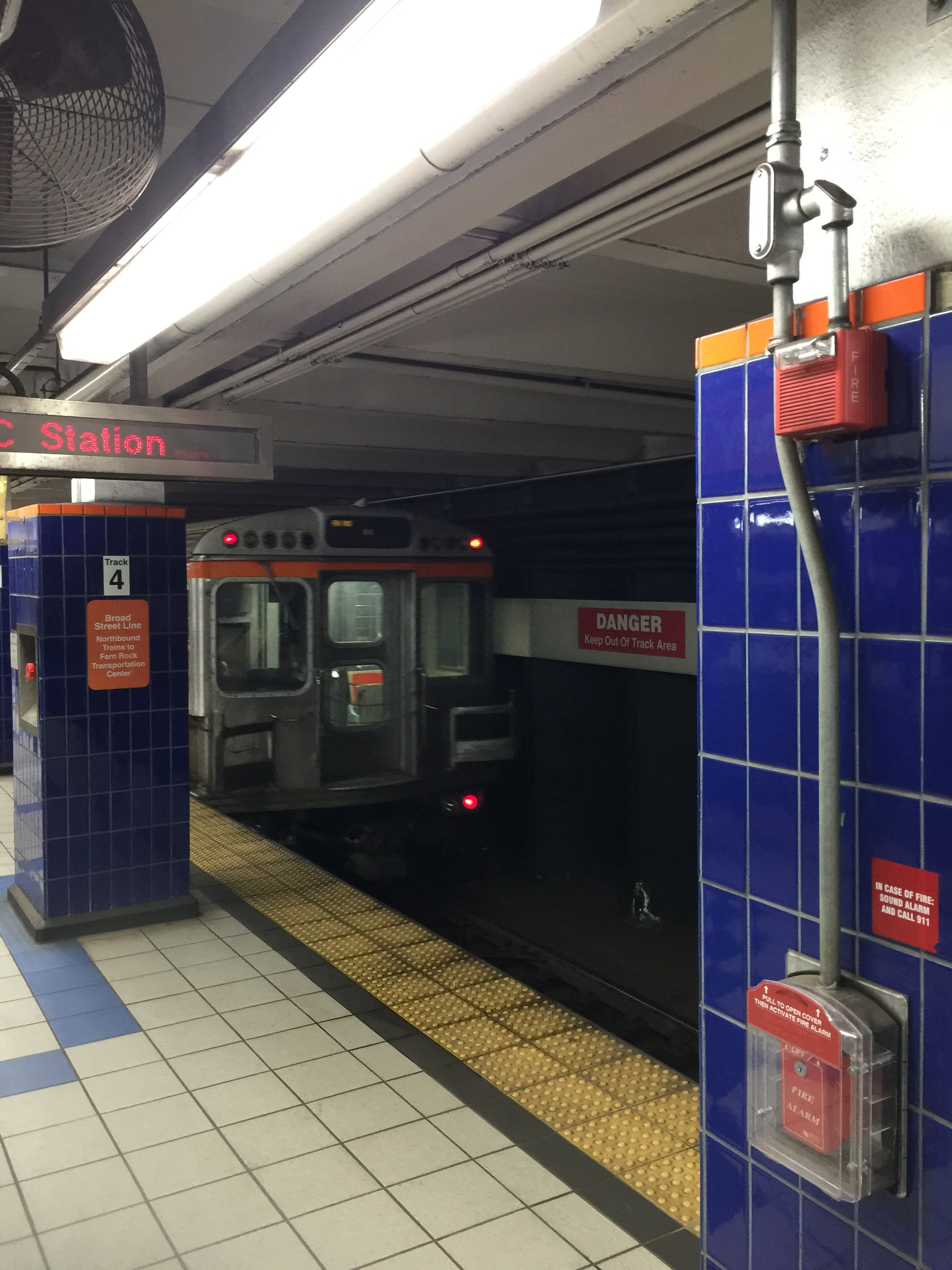
Train leaving the station

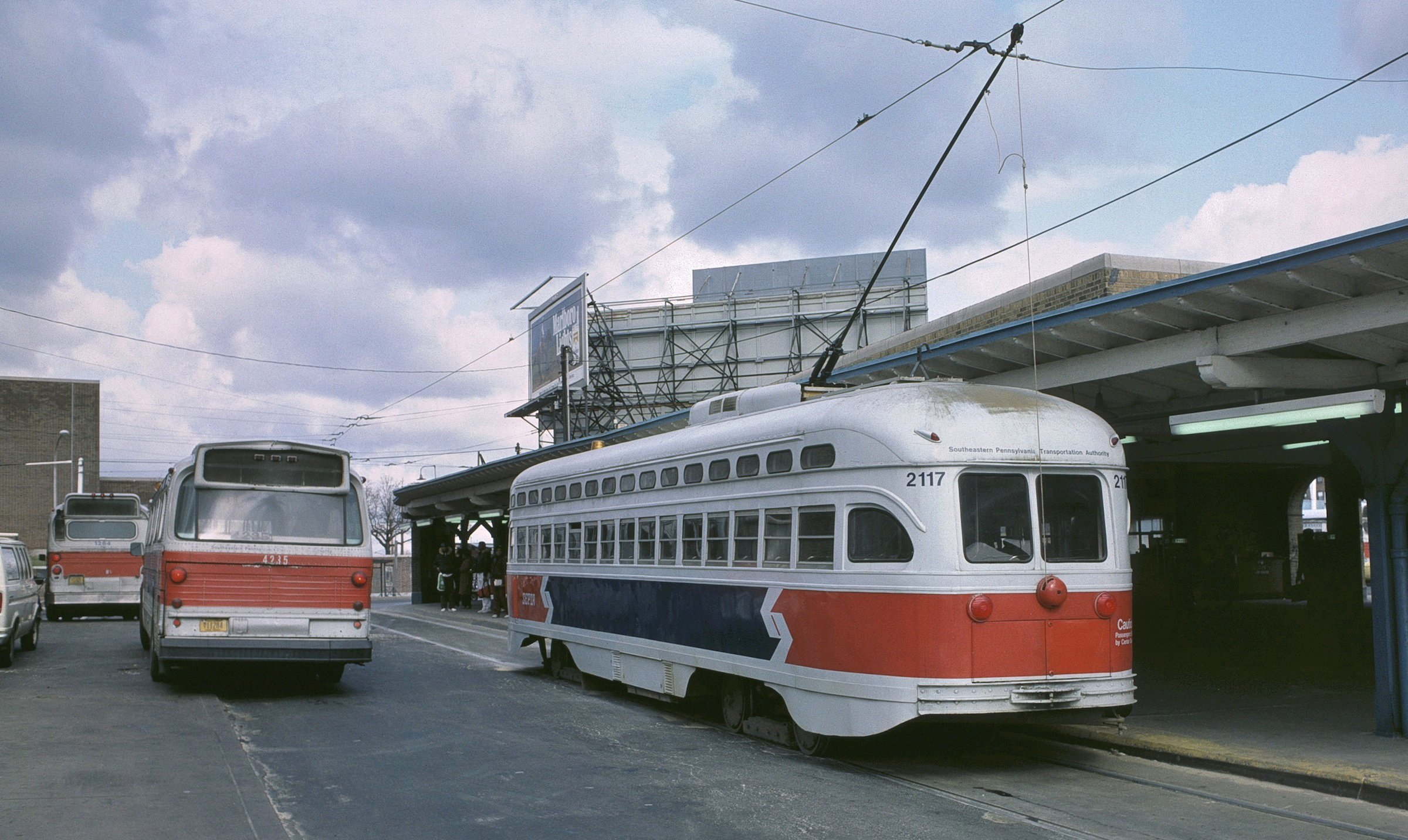
Olney Terminal in 1984 with All-Electric PCC 2117 awaiting departure on Surface Streetcar Trolley Route 6.
