= Pennsylvania's 2nd congressional district =

U.S. House district for Pennsylvania

Coordinates: 40°00′55″N 75°13′20″W

- Interactive map of district boundaries since January 3, 2023 (Philadelphia outlined in red)
- Representative: Brendan Boyle; D–Philadelphia
- Distribution: 100.00% urban; 0.00% rural
- Population (2025): 759,389
- Median household income: $67,410
- Ethnicity: 37.4% White; 24.7% Hispanic; 24.2% Black; 9.5% Asian; 3.2% Two or more races; 1.1% other
- Cook PVI: D+19

Pennsylvania's second congressional district includes all of Northeast Philadelphia and parts of North Philadelphia east of Broad Street, as well as Center City and portions of Philadelphia's River Wards. It has been represented by Democrat Brendan Boyle since 2019.

The district is demographically diverse, with about 39% of residents identifying as white, nearly 27% of residents identifying as Black, 26% identifying as Hispanic or Latino (of any race), and 8% identifying as Asian.

Prior to 2018, the district covered West Philadelphia, North Philadelphia, and Northwest Philadelphia, as well as parts of South Philadelphia, Center City, and western suburbs such as Lower Merion Township in Montgomery County. Before the 113th Congress, the district did not contain Lower Merion Township but instead contained Cheltenham Township.

The Supreme Court of Pennsylvania redrew the district in February 2018 after ruling the previous map unconstitutional due to partisan gerrymandering. The new second district is essentially the successor to the previous first district. As such, it remained heavily Democratic for the 2018 election and representation thereafter. Brendan Boyle, the incumbent from the previous 13th district, ran for re-election in the new 2nd district. Parts of the previous second district were shifted to the third.

Congressman Chaka Fattah represented the district from 1995 to 2016. On July 29, 2015, Fattah and a group of associates were indicted on federal charges related to their alleged roles in a racketeering and influence peddling conspiracy. On April 26, 2016, Dwight Evans toppled Fattah in a competitive Democratic primary election. Fattah resigned June 23, 2016. Evans then won a special election to fill Fattah's seat. He also won election for the regular term beginning January 3, 2017. Evans won re-election in the new 3rd congressional district.

== Recent election results from statewide races ==
Year	Office	Results
2008	President	Obama 73–26%
2008	Attorney General	Morganelli 71–29%
2008	Auditor General	Wagner 78–22%
2010	Senate	Sestak 73–27%
2010	Governor	Onorato 71–29%
2012	President	Obama 78–22%
2012	Senate	Casey Jr. 80–20%
2014	Governor	Wolf 80–20%
2016	President	Clinton 74–24%
2016	Senate	McGinty 73–26%
2016	Attorney General	Shapiro 77–23%
2016	Auditor General	DePasquale 74–23%
2016	Treasurer	Torsella 77–21%
2018	Senate	Casey Jr. 79–20%
2018	Governor	Wolf 80–19%
2020	President	Biden 71–28%
2020	Attorney General	Shapiro 72–26%
2020	Auditor General	Ahmad 69–27%
2020	Treasurer	Torsella 70–27%
2022	Senate	Fetterman 72–26%
2022	Governor	Shapiro 76–22%
2024	President	Harris 67–32%
2024	Senate	Casey Jr. 68–29%
2024	Attorney General	DePasquale 65–31%
2024	Auditor General	Kenyatta 68–30%
2024	Treasurer	McClelland 67–31%

== Counties and municipalities ==
Philadelphia County (1)

Philadelphia (part; also 3rd and 5th)

Philadelphia neighborhoods in the 2nd district include:

- Academy Gardens
- Ashton Wooden Bridge
- Bridesburg
- Bustleton
- Center City
- East Kensington
- Fairhill
- Feltonville
- Fishtown
- Fox Chase
- Frankford
- Franklinville
- Glenwood
- Harrowgate
- Hartranft
- Holmesburg
- Hunting Park
- Kensington
- Krewstown
- Lawncrest
- Lawndale
- Lexington Park
- Logan/Ogontz/Fern Rock (part; also 3rd)
- Ludlow
- Mayfair
- Millbrook
- Morrell Park
- Norris Square
- Normandy
- North Philadelphia
- North Philadelphia East
- North Philadelphia West
- Northeast Philadelphia
- Port Richmond
- Oak Lane/East Oak Lane
- Olde Richmond
- Olney
- Oxford Circle
- Parkwood
- Poplar
- Rhawnhurst
- Somerton
- Tacony
- Torresdale
- West Kensington
- Wissinoming
- Yorktown

== List of members representing the district ==
The district was organized from Pennsylvania's At-large congressional district in 1791.

=== 1791–1793: one seat ===
Representative	Party	Years	Cong ress	Electoral history
District first established March 4, 1791
Frederick Muhlenberg (New Hanover Township)	Anti-Administration	March 4, 1791 – March 3, 1793	2nd	Redistricted from the at-large district and re-elected in 1791. Redistricted to the at-large district.

=== 1795–1803: one seat ===
Representative	Party	Years	Cong ress	Electoral history
Frederick Muhlenberg (New Hanover Township)	Democratic-Republican	March 4, 1795 – March 3, 1797	4th	Redistricted from the at-large district and re-elected in 1794. Retired.
Blair McClenachan (Philadelphia)	Democratic-Republican	March 4, 1797 – March 3, 1799	5th	Elected in 1796. Retired.
Michael Leib (Philadelphia)	Democratic-Republican	March 4, 1799 – March 3, 1803	6th 7th	Elected in 1798. Re-elected in 1800. Redistricted to the 1st district.

=== 1803–1813: three seats ===
Cong ress	Years	Seat A			Seat B			Seat C		
Cong ress	Years	Representative	Party	Electoral history	Representative	Party	Electoral history	Representative	Party	Electoral history
8th	March 4, 1803 – March 3, 1805	Robert Brown (Weaversville)	Democratic-Republican	Redistricted from the 4th district and re-elected in 1802. Re-elected in 1804. Re-elected in 1806. Re-elected in 1808. Re-elected in 1810. Redistricted to the 6th district.	Frederick Conrad (Center Point)	Democratic-Republican	Elected in 1802. Re-elected in 1804. Lost re-election.	Isaac Van Horne (Solebury Township)	Democratic-Republican	Redistricted from the 4th district and re-elected in 1802. Retired.
9th	March 4, 1805 – March 3, 1807	Robert Brown (Weaversville)	Democratic-Republican	Redistricted from the 4th district and re-elected in 1802. Re-elected in 1804. Re-elected in 1806. Re-elected in 1808. Re-elected in 1810. Redistricted to the 6th district.	Frederick Conrad (Center Point)	Democratic-Republican	Elected in 1802. Re-elected in 1804. Lost re-election.	John Pugh (Doylestown)	Democratic-Republican	Elected in 1804. Re-elected in 1806. Lost re-election.
10th	March 4, 1807 – March 3, 1809	Robert Brown (Weaversville)	Democratic-Republican	Redistricted from the 4th district and re-elected in 1802. Re-elected in 1804. Re-elected in 1806. Re-elected in 1808. Re-elected in 1810. Redistricted to the 6th district.	William Milnor (Philadelphia)	Federalist	Elected in 1806. Re-elected in 1808. Lost re-election.	John Pugh (Doylestown)	Democratic-Republican	Elected in 1804. Re-elected in 1806. Lost re-election.
11th	March 4, 1809 – March 3, 1811	Robert Brown (Weaversville)	Democratic-Republican	Redistricted from the 4th district and re-elected in 1802. Re-elected in 1804. Re-elected in 1806. Re-elected in 1808. Re-elected in 1810. Redistricted to the 6th district.	William Milnor (Philadelphia)	Federalist	Elected in 1806. Re-elected in 1808. Lost re-election.	John Ross (Easton)	Democratic-Republican	Elected in 1808. Retired.
12th	March 4, 1811 – March 3, 1813	Robert Brown (Weaversville)	Democratic-Republican	Redistricted from the 4th district and re-elected in 1802. Re-elected in 1804. Re-elected in 1806. Re-elected in 1808. Re-elected in 1810. Redistricted to the 6th district.	Jonathan Roberts (Norristown)	Democratic-Republican	Elected in 1810.	William Rodman (Bristol)	Democratic-Republican	Elected in 1810. Lost re-election as a Federalist.

=== 1813–1823: two seats ===
Cong ress	Years	Seat A			Seat B		
Cong ress	Years	Representative	Party	Electoral history	Representative	Party	Electoral history
13th	March 4, 1813 – February 24, 1814	Roger Davis (Charlestown)	Democratic-Republican	Redistricted from the 3rd district, and re-elected in 1812. Retired.	Jonathan Roberts (Norristown)	Democratic-Republican	Re-elected in 1812. Resigned when elected U.S. Senator.
13th	February 24, 1814 – October 11, 1814	Roger Davis (Charlestown)	Democratic-Republican	Redistricted from the 3rd district, and re-elected in 1812. Retired.	Vacant		
13th	October 11, 1814 – March 3, 1815	Roger Davis (Charlestown)	Democratic-Republican	Redistricted from the 3rd district, and re-elected in 1812. Retired.	Samuel Henderson (Norristown)	Federalist	Elected October 11, 1814, to finish Roberts's term and seated November 27, 1814. Lost election the same day to the next term.
14th	March 4, 1815 – March 3, 1817	William Darlington (West Chester)	Democratic-Republican	Elected in 1814. Lost re-election.	John Hahn (Pottsgrove)	Democratic-Republican	Elected in 1814. Lost re-election.
15th	March 4, 1817 – March 3, 1819	Isaac Darlington (West Chester)	Federalist	Elected in 1816. Retired.	Levi Pawling (Norristown)	Federalist	Elected in 1816. Lost re-election.
16th	March 4, 1819 – March 3, 1821	William Darlington (West Chester)	Democratic-Republican	Elected in 1818. Re-elected in 1820. Lost re-election.	Samuel Gross (Trappe)	Democratic-Republican	Elected in 1818. Re-elected in 1820. Retired.
17th	March 4, 1821 – March 3, 1823	William Darlington (West Chester)	Democratic-Republican	Elected in 1818. Re-elected in 1820. Lost re-election.	Samuel Gross (Trappe)	Democratic-Republican	Elected in 1818. Re-elected in 1820. Retired.

=== 1823–1833: one seat ===
Representative	Party	Years	Cong ress	Electoral history
Joseph Hemphill (Philadelphia)	Jacksonian Federalist	March 4, 1823 – March 3, 1825	18th	Redistricted from the 1st district, and re-elected in 1822. Re-elected in 1824. Resigned.
Joseph Hemphill (Philadelphia)	Jacksonian	March 4, 1825 – 1826	19th	Redistricted from the 1st district, and re-elected in 1822. Re-elected in 1824. Resigned.
Vacant			19th	1826 – October 26, 1826
Thomas Kittera (Philadelphia)	Anti-Jacksonian	October 26, 1826 – March 3, 1827	19th	Elected to finish Hemphill's term in 1826. Lost re-election.
General election ended in a tie vote and the seat remained vacant.			20th	March 4, 1827 – January 14, 1828
John Sergeant (Philadelphia)	Anti-Jacksonian	January 14, 1828 – March 3, 1829	20th	Elected October 9, 1827, to finish the vacant term and seated January 14, 1828. Lost re-election.
Joseph Hemphill (Philadelphia)	Jacksonian	March 4, 1829 – March 3, 1831	21st	Elected in 1828. Retired.
Henry Horn (Philadelphia)	Jacksonian	March 4, 1831 – March 3, 1833	22nd	Elected in 1830. Lost re-election.

=== 1833–1843: two seats ===
Cong ress	Years	Seat A			Seat B		
Cong ress	Years	Representative	Party	Electoral history	Representative	Party	Electoral history
23rd	March 4, 1833 – March 3, 1835	Horace Binney (Philadelphia)	Anti-Jacksonian	Elected in 1832. Retired.	James Harper (Philadelphia)	Anti-Jacksonian	Elected in 1832. Re-elected in 1834. Retired.
24th	March 4, 1835 – March 3, 1837	Joseph R. Ingersoll (Philadelphia)	Anti-Jacksonian	Elected in 1834. Retired.	James Harper (Philadelphia)	Anti-Jacksonian	Elected in 1832. Re-elected in 1834. Retired.
25th	March 4, 1837 – March 3, 1839	John Sergeant (Philadelphia)	Whig	Elected in 1836. Re-elected in 1838. Re-elected in 1840. Resigned.	George W. Toland (Philadelphia)	Whig	Elected in 1836. Re-elected in 1838. Re-elected in 1840. [data missing]
26th	March 4, 1839 – March 3, 1841	John Sergeant (Philadelphia)	Whig	Elected in 1836. Re-elected in 1838. Re-elected in 1840. Resigned.	George W. Toland (Philadelphia)	Whig	Elected in 1836. Re-elected in 1838. Re-elected in 1840. [data missing]
27th	March 3, 1841 – September 15, 1841	John Sergeant (Philadelphia)	Whig	Elected in 1836. Re-elected in 1838. Re-elected in 1840. Resigned.	George W. Toland (Philadelphia)	Whig	Elected in 1836. Re-elected in 1838. Re-elected in 1840. [data missing]
27th	September 15, 1841 – October 12, 1841	Vacant			George W. Toland (Philadelphia)	Whig	Elected in 1836. Re-elected in 1838. Re-elected in 1840. [data missing]
27th	October 12, 1841 – March 3, 1843	Joseph R. Ingersoll (Philadelphia)	Whig	Elected in 1841 to finish Sergeant's term.	George W. Toland (Philadelphia)	Whig	Elected in 1836. Re-elected in 1838. Re-elected in 1840. [data missing]

=== 1843–present: one seat ===
Member	Party	Years	Cong ress	Electoral history	District location
Joseph R. Ingersoll (Philadelphia)	Whig	March 4, 1843 – March 3, 1849	28th 29th 30th	Re-elected in 1843. Re-elected in 1844. Re-elected in 1846. Declined to accept renomination.	1843–1853 [data missing]
Joseph R. Chandler (Philadelphia)	Whig	March 4, 1849 – March 3, 1855	31st 32nd 33rd	Elected in 1848. Re-elected in 1850. Re-elected in 1852. Lost re-election.	1843–1853 [data missing]
Joseph R. Chandler (Philadelphia)	Whig	March 4, 1849 – March 3, 1855	31st 32nd 33rd	Elected in 1848. Re-elected in 1850. Re-elected in 1852. Lost re-election.	1853–1863
Job R. Tyson (Philadelphia)	Whig	March 4, 1855 – March 3, 1857	34th	Elected in 1854. [data missing]	1853–1863
Edward J. Morris (Philadelphia)	Republican	March 4, 1857 – June 8, 1861	35th 36th 37th	Elected in 1856. Re-elected in 1858. Re-elected in 1860. Resigned to become U.S. Minister to the Ottoman Empire.	1853–1863
Vacant		June 8, 1861 – July 2, 1861	37th		1853–1863
Charles J. Biddle (Philadelphia)	Democratic	July 2, 1861 – March 3, 1863	37th	Elected to finish Morris's term. [data missing]	1853–1863
Charles O'Neill (Philadelphia)	Republican	March 4, 1863 – March 3, 1871	38th 39th 40th 41st	Elected in 1862. Re-elected in 1864. Re-elected in 1866. Re-elected in 1868. Lost re-election.	1863–1869
Charles O'Neill (Philadelphia)	Republican	March 4, 1863 – March 3, 1871	38th 39th 40th 41st	Elected in 1862. Re-elected in 1864. Re-elected in 1866. Re-elected in 1868. Lost re-election.	1869–1873
John V. Creely (Philadelphia)	Republican	March 4, 1871 – March 3, 1873	42nd	Elected in 1870. Disappeared in late 1872.	1869–1873
Charles O'Neill (Philadelphia)	Republican	March 4, 1873 – November 25, 1893	43rd 44th 45th 46th 47th 48th 49th 50th 51st 52nd 53rd	Elected in 1872. Re-elected in 1874. Re-elected in 1876. Re-elected in 1878. Re-elected in 1880. Re-elected in 1882. Re-elected in 1884. Re-elected in 1886. Re-elected in 1888. Re-elected in 1890. Re-elected in 1892. Died.	
Charles O'Neill (Philadelphia)	Republican	March 4, 1873 – November 25, 1893	43rd 44th 45th 46th 47th 48th 49th 50th 51st 52nd 53rd	Elected in 1872. Re-elected in 1874. Re-elected in 1876. Re-elected in 1878. Re-elected in 1880. Re-elected in 1882. Re-elected in 1884. Re-elected in 1886. Re-elected in 1888. Re-elected in 1890. Re-elected in 1892. Died.	1873–1875 [data missing]
Charles O'Neill (Philadelphia)	Republican	March 4, 1873 – November 25, 1893	43rd 44th 45th 46th 47th 48th 49th 50th 51st 52nd 53rd	Elected in 1872. Re-elected in 1874. Re-elected in 1876. Re-elected in 1878. Re-elected in 1880. Re-elected in 1882. Re-elected in 1884. Re-elected in 1886. Re-elected in 1888. Re-elected in 1890. Re-elected in 1892. Died.	1875–1883 [data missing]
Charles O'Neill (Philadelphia)	Republican	March 4, 1873 – November 25, 1893	43rd 44th 45th 46th 47th 48th 49th 50th 51st 52nd 53rd	Elected in 1872. Re-elected in 1874. Re-elected in 1876. Re-elected in 1878. Re-elected in 1880. Re-elected in 1882. Re-elected in 1884. Re-elected in 1886. Re-elected in 1888. Re-elected in 1890. Re-elected in 1892. Died.	1883–1889 [data missing]
Charles O'Neill (Philadelphia)	Republican	March 4, 1873 – November 25, 1893	43rd 44th 45th 46th 47th 48th 49th 50th 51st 52nd 53rd	Elected in 1872. Re-elected in 1874. Re-elected in 1876. Re-elected in 1878. Re-elected in 1880. Re-elected in 1882. Re-elected in 1884. Re-elected in 1886. Re-elected in 1888. Re-elected in 1890. Re-elected in 1892. Died.	1889–1893 [data missing]
Charles O'Neill (Philadelphia)	Republican	March 4, 1873 – November 25, 1893	43rd 44th 45th 46th 47th 48th 49th 50th 51st 52nd 53rd	Elected in 1872. Re-elected in 1874. Re-elected in 1876. Re-elected in 1878. Re-elected in 1880. Re-elected in 1882. Re-elected in 1884. Re-elected in 1886. Re-elected in 1888. Re-elected in 1890. Re-elected in 1892. Died.	1893–1903 [data missing]
Vacant		November 25, 1893 – December 19, 1893	53rd		1893–1903 [data missing]
Robert Adams Jr. (Philadelphia)	Republican	December 19, 1893 – June 1, 1906	53rd 54th 55th 56th 57th 58th 59th	Elected to finish O'Neill's term. Re-elected in 1894. Re-elected in 1896. Re-elected in 1898. Re-elected in 1900. Re-elected in 1902. Re-elected in 1904. Died.	1893–1903 [data missing]
Robert Adams Jr. (Philadelphia)	Republican	December 19, 1893 – June 1, 1906	53rd 54th 55th 56th 57th 58th 59th	Elected to finish O'Neill's term. Re-elected in 1894. Re-elected in 1896. Re-elected in 1898. Re-elected in 1900. Re-elected in 1902. Re-elected in 1904. Died.	1903–1913 [data missing]
Vacant		June 1, 1906 – November 6, 1906	59th		1903–1913 [data missing]
John E. Reyburn (Philadelphia)	Republican	November 6, 1906 – March 31, 1907	59th 60th	Elected to finish Adams's term. Re-elected in 1906. Resigned to become Mayor of Philadelphia.	1903–1913 [data missing]
Vacant		March 31, 1907 – November 5, 1907	60th		1903–1913 [data missing]
Joel Cook (Philadelphia)	Republican	November 5, 1907 – December 15, 1910	60th 61st	Elected to finish Reyburn's term. Re-elected in 1908. Re-elected in 1910. Died.	1903–1913 [data missing]
Vacant		December 15, 1910 – May 23, 1911	61st 62nd		1903–1913 [data missing]
William S. Reyburn (Philadelphia)	Republican	May 23, 1911 – March 3, 1913	62nd	Elected to finish Cook's term. Retired.	1903–1913 [data missing]
George S. Graham (Philadelphia)	Republican	March 4, 1913 – July 4, 1931	63rd 64th 65th 66th 67th 68th 69th 70th 71st 72nd	Elected in 1912. Re-elected in 1914. Re-elected in 1916. Re-elected in 1918. Re-elected in 1920. Re-elected in 1922. Re-elected in 1924. Re-elected in 1926. Re-elected in 1928. Re-elected in 1930. Died.	1913–1923
George S. Graham (Philadelphia)	Republican	March 4, 1913 – July 4, 1931	63rd 64th 65th 66th 67th 68th 69th 70th 71st 72nd	Elected in 1912. Re-elected in 1914. Re-elected in 1916. Re-elected in 1918. Re-elected in 1920. Re-elected in 1922. Re-elected in 1924. Re-elected in 1926. Re-elected in 1928. Re-elected in 1930. Died.	1923–1933
Vacant		July 4, 1931 – November 3, 1931	72nd		1923–1933
Edward L. Stokes (Philadelphia)	Republican	November 3, 1931 – March 3, 1933	72nd	Elected to finish Graham's term. Redistricted to the 6th district.	1923–1933
James M. Beck (Philadelphia)	Republican	March 3, 1933 – September 30, 1934	73rd	Redistricted from the 1st district and re-elected in 1932. Resigned to object to the New Deal.	1933–1943
Vacant		September 30, 1934 – January 3, 1935	73rd		1933–1943
William H. Wilson (Philadelphia)	Republican	January 3, 1935 – January 3, 1937	74th	Elected in 1934. Lost re-election.	1933–1943
James P. McGranery (Philadelphia)	Democratic	January 3, 1937 – November 17, 1943	75th 76th 77th 78th	Elected in 1936. Re-elected in 1938. Re-elected in 1940. Re-elected in 1942. Resigned to become United States Assistant Attorney General.	1933–1943
James P. McGranery (Philadelphia)	Democratic	January 3, 1937 – November 17, 1943	75th 76th 77th 78th	Elected in 1936. Re-elected in 1938. Re-elected in 1940. Re-elected in 1942. Resigned to become United States Assistant Attorney General.	1943–1945
Vacant		November 17, 1943 – January 18, 1944	78th		1943–1945
Joseph M. Pratt (Philadelphia)	Republican	January 18, 1944 – January 3, 1945	78th	Elected to finish McGranery's term. Redistricted to the 3rd district and lost re-election.	1943–1945
William T. Granahan (Philadelphia)	Democratic	January 3, 1945 – January 3, 1947	79th	Elected in 1944. Lost re-election.	1945–1953
Robert N. McGarvey (Philadelphia)	Republican	January 3, 1947 – January 3, 1949	80th	Elected in 1946. Lost re-election.	1945–1953
William T. Granahan (Philadelphia)	Democratic	January 3, 1949 – May 25, 1956	81st 82nd 83rd 84th	Elected in 1948. Re-elected in 1950. Re-elected in 1952. Re-elected in 1954. Died.	1945–1953
William T. Granahan (Philadelphia)	Democratic	January 3, 1949 – May 25, 1956	81st 82nd 83rd 84th	Elected in 1948. Re-elected in 1950. Re-elected in 1952. Re-elected in 1954. Died.	1953–1963
Vacant		May 25, 1956 – November 6, 1956	84th		1953–1963
Kathryn E. Granahan (Philadelphia)	Democratic	November 6, 1956 – January 3, 1963	84th 85th 86th 87th	Elected to finish her husband's term. Re-elected in 1956. Re-elected in 1958. Re-elected in 1960. Retired.	1953–1963
Robert N. C. Nix Sr. (Philadelphia)	Democratic	January 3, 1963 – January 3, 1979	88th 89th 90th 91st 92nd 93rd 94th 95th	Redistricted from the 4th district and re-elected in 1962. Re-elected in 1964. Re-elected in 1966. Re-elected in 1968. Re-elected in 1970. Re-elected in 1972. Re-elected in 1974. Re-elected in 1976. Lost renomination.	
Robert N. C. Nix Sr. (Philadelphia)	Democratic	January 3, 1963 – January 3, 1979	88th 89th 90th 91st 92nd 93rd 94th 95th	Redistricted from the 4th district and re-elected in 1962. Re-elected in 1964. Re-elected in 1966. Re-elected in 1968. Re-elected in 1970. Re-elected in 1972. Re-elected in 1974. Re-elected in 1976. Lost renomination.	1973–1983
William H. Gray III (Philadelphia)	Democratic	January 3, 1979 – September 11, 1991	96th 97th 98th 99th 100th 101st 102nd	Elected in 1978. Re-elected in 1980. Re-elected in 1982. Re-elected in 1984. Re-elected in 1986. Re-elected in 1988. Re-elected in 1990. Resigned to become President of the United Negro College Fund.	1973–1983
William H. Gray III (Philadelphia)	Democratic	January 3, 1979 – September 11, 1991	96th 97th 98th 99th 100th 101st 102nd	Elected in 1978. Re-elected in 1980. Re-elected in 1982. Re-elected in 1984. Re-elected in 1986. Re-elected in 1988. Re-elected in 1990. Resigned to become President of the United Negro College Fund.	1983–1989
William H. Gray III (Philadelphia)	Democratic	January 3, 1979 – September 11, 1991	96th 97th 98th 99th 100th 101st 102nd	Elected in 1978. Re-elected in 1980. Re-elected in 1982. Re-elected in 1984. Re-elected in 1986. Re-elected in 1988. Re-elected in 1990. Resigned to become President of the United Negro College Fund.	1989–1993
Vacant		September 11, 1991 – November 5, 1991	102nd		1989–1993
Lucien Blackwell (Philadelphia)	Democratic	November 5, 1991 – January 3, 1995	102nd 103rd	Elected to finish Gray's term. Re-elected in 1992. Lost renomination.	1989–1993
Lucien Blackwell (Philadelphia)	Democratic	November 5, 1991 – January 3, 1995	102nd 103rd	Elected to finish Gray's term. Re-elected in 1992. Lost renomination.	1993–2003
Chaka Fattah (Philadelphia)	Democratic	January 3, 1995 – June 23, 2016	104th 105th 106th 107th 108th 109th 110th 111th 112th 113th 114th	Elected in 1994. Re-elected in 1996. Re-elected in 1998. Re-elected in 2000. Re-elected in 2002. Re-elected in 2004. Re-elected in 2006. Re-elected in 2008. Re-elected in 2010. Re-elected in 2012. Re-elected in 2014. Lost renomination and resigned.	1993–2003
Chaka Fattah (Philadelphia)	Democratic	January 3, 1995 – June 23, 2016	104th 105th 106th 107th 108th 109th 110th 111th 112th 113th 114th	Elected in 1994. Re-elected in 1996. Re-elected in 1998. Re-elected in 2000. Re-elected in 2002. Re-elected in 2004. Re-elected in 2006. Re-elected in 2008. Re-elected in 2010. Re-elected in 2012. Re-elected in 2014. Lost renomination and resigned.	2003–2013
Chaka Fattah (Philadelphia)	Democratic	January 3, 1995 – June 23, 2016	104th 105th 106th 107th 108th 109th 110th 111th 112th 113th 114th	Elected in 1994. Re-elected in 1996. Re-elected in 1998. Re-elected in 2000. Re-elected in 2002. Re-elected in 2004. Re-elected in 2006. Re-elected in 2008. Re-elected in 2010. Re-elected in 2012. Re-elected in 2014. Lost renomination and resigned.	2013–2019
Vacant		June 23, 2016 – November 14, 2016	114th		2013–2019
Dwight Evans (Philadelphia)	Democratic	November 14, 2016 – January 3, 2019	114th 115th	Elected to finish Fattah's term. Elected to full term in 2016. Redistricted to the 3rd district.	2013–2019
Brendan Boyle (Philadelphia)	Democratic	January 3, 2019 – present	116th 117th 118th 119th	Redistricted from the 13th district and re-elected in 2018. Re-elected in 2020. Re-elected in 2022. Re-elected in 2024. Re-elected in 2026.	2019–2023
Brendan Boyle (Philadelphia)	Democratic	January 3, 2019 – present	116th 117th 118th 119th	Redistricted from the 13th district and re-elected in 2018. Re-elected in 2020. Re-elected in 2022. Re-elected in 2024. Re-elected in 2026.	2023–present

== Recent elections ==
=== 2012 ===
Pennsylvania's 2nd congressional district, 2012
Party	Candidate	Votes	%
Democratic	Chaka Fattah (incumbent)	318,176	89.3
Republican	Robert Mansfield	33,381	9.4
Independent	James Foster	4,829	1.3
Total votes		356,386	100.0
Democratic hold			

=== 2014 ===
Pennsylvania's 2nd congressional district, 2014
Party	Candidate	Votes	%
Democratic	Chaka Fattah (incumbent)	181,141	87.7
Republican	Armond James	25,397	12.3
Total votes		206,538	100.0
Democratic hold			

=== 2016 ===
Pennsylvania's 2nd congressional district, 2016
Party	Candidate	Votes	%
Democratic	Dwight E. Evans	322,514	90.2
Republican	James Jones	35,131	9.8
Total votes		357,645	100.0
Democratic hold			

=== 2018 ===
Pennsylvania's 2nd congressional district, 2018
Party	Candidate	Votes	%
Democratic	Brendan Boyle (incumbent)	159,600	79.0
Republican	David Torres	42,382	21.0
Total votes		201,982	100.0
Democratic hold			

=== 2020 ===
Pennsylvania's 2nd congressional district, 2020
Party	Candidate	Votes	%
Democratic	Brendan Boyle (incumbent)	198,140	72.5
Republican	David Torres	75,022	27.5
Total votes		273,162	100.0
Democratic hold			

=== 2022 ===
Pennsylvania's 2nd congressional district, 2022
Party	Candidate	Votes	%
Democratic	Brendan Boyle (incumbent)	141,229	75.7
Republican	Aaron Bashir	45,454	24.3
Total votes		186,683	100.0
Democratic hold			

=== 2024 ===
Pennsylvania's 1st congressional district, 2024
Party	Candidate	Votes	%
Democratic	Brendan Boyle (incumbent)	193,691	71.5
Republican	Haroon Bashir	77,355	28.5
Total votes		271,046	100.0
Democratic hold			

== See also ==
- List of United States congressional districts
- Pennsylvania's congressional districts
