= Holme Circle, Philadelphia =

Holme Circle
- Neighborhood of Philadelphia
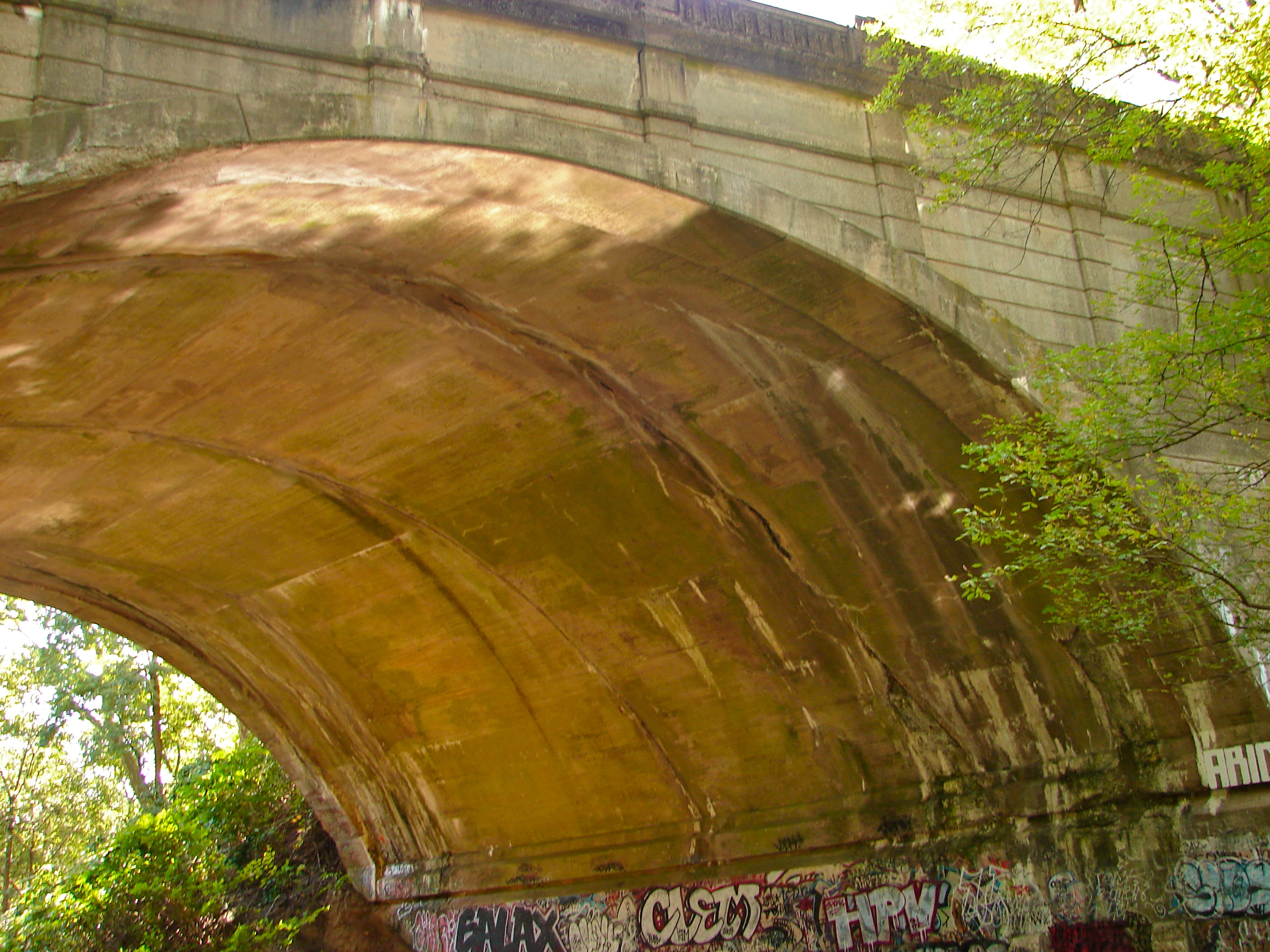
- Holme Ave Bridge Crossing Pennypack Creek

- Location within Philadelphia
- Country: United States
- State: Pennsylvania
- County: Philadelphia County
- City: Philadelphia
- Area codes: 215, 267, and 445

Holme Circle is a neighborhood in Northeast Philadelphia, Pennsylvania, United States. It is located in the loop of Pennypack Creek at Holme Avenue and Welsh Road.

The area is generally composed of two-story, twin homes north of the Holme Circle (Walnut Hill, Axe Factory and Manchester Streets—built 1959–1964), one-story twins southeast of the Circle (Colfax, Draper and Albion Streets—built circa 1962) and single homes south of Welsh Road and Holme Avenue (Winchester Park—Stamford, Hargrave, Lenola and Martindale Streets—built 1951–1955).

St Jerome Parish serves the area; the Robert B. Pollock Elementary School is situated at Welsh Road and Tolbut Street.

The neighborhood is named after Thomas Holme.

== Prominent people ==
Former prominent residents include Sylvester Stallone (on Mower Street).

== See also ==
- Ashton-Woodenbridge
