= Winchester Park, Philadelphia =

Winchester Park
- Neighborhood of Philadelphia
- Location within Philadelphia
- Country: United States
- State: Pennsylvania
- County: Philadelphia County
- City: Philadelphia
- ZIP code: 19136
- Area codes: 215, 267 and 445

Winchester Park is a neighborhood in Far Northeast Philadelphia, Pennsylvania, United States. It is located in the vicinity of Pennypack Park, north and west of Holmesburg.

Winchester Park is zoned for single-family homes. The first part of the development, on Winchester Avenue between Albion Street and 75 feet east of Holmehurst Avenue, was built in 1940. The remainder of the area was built between 1947 and 1955. In 1955, St Jerome Roman Catholic Church was built at Colfax and Stamford Streets. It is the parish that serves the area. The zip code is 19136. Winchester Park's boundaries are Holme Avenue, Welsh Road and Rhawn Street.
