= Modena Park, Philadelphia =

Modena Park
- Neighborhood of Philadelphia
- Location within Philadelphia
- Country: United States
- State: Pennsylvania
- County: Philadelphia County
- City: Philadelphia
- Area codes: 215, 267, and 445

Modena Park is a neighborhood in Northeast Philadelphia, Pennsylvania, United States. It is located east of Northeast Philadelphia Airport, near Morrell Avenue.

The ground was owned by the estate of William Dudley in 1910, although the neighborhood itself was not built until 1963. It features short blocks of two-story rowhouses with basements. This neighborhood borders: Morrell Park to its south; Parkwood, Philadelphia, Pennsylvania to its north; Walton Run woods to the west; and Millbrook, Philadelphia, Pennsylvania, to the east.

== Education ==
Public-

General Harry LaBrum Middle School 10858 Hawley Rd, Philadelphia, PA 19154

Philadelphia Archdiocese-

Archbishop Ryan High School 11260 Academy Rd, Philadelphia, PA, 19154

St. Martha's School 11452 Academy Rd, Philadelphia, PA,

== Recreation ==
Picariello Playground 10811 Calera Rd, Philadelphia, PA 19154

Liberty Bell Youth Organization Red Lion & Calera Rds Road, Philadelphia, PA 19114

Philadelphia Soccer Club 10402 Decatur Road, Philadelphia, PA 19154
