= Northeast Philadelphia =

Neighborhood of Philadelphia in Philadelphia, Pennsylvania, United States

Coordinates: 40.0873°N 74.9616°W

- Neighborhood of Philadelphia
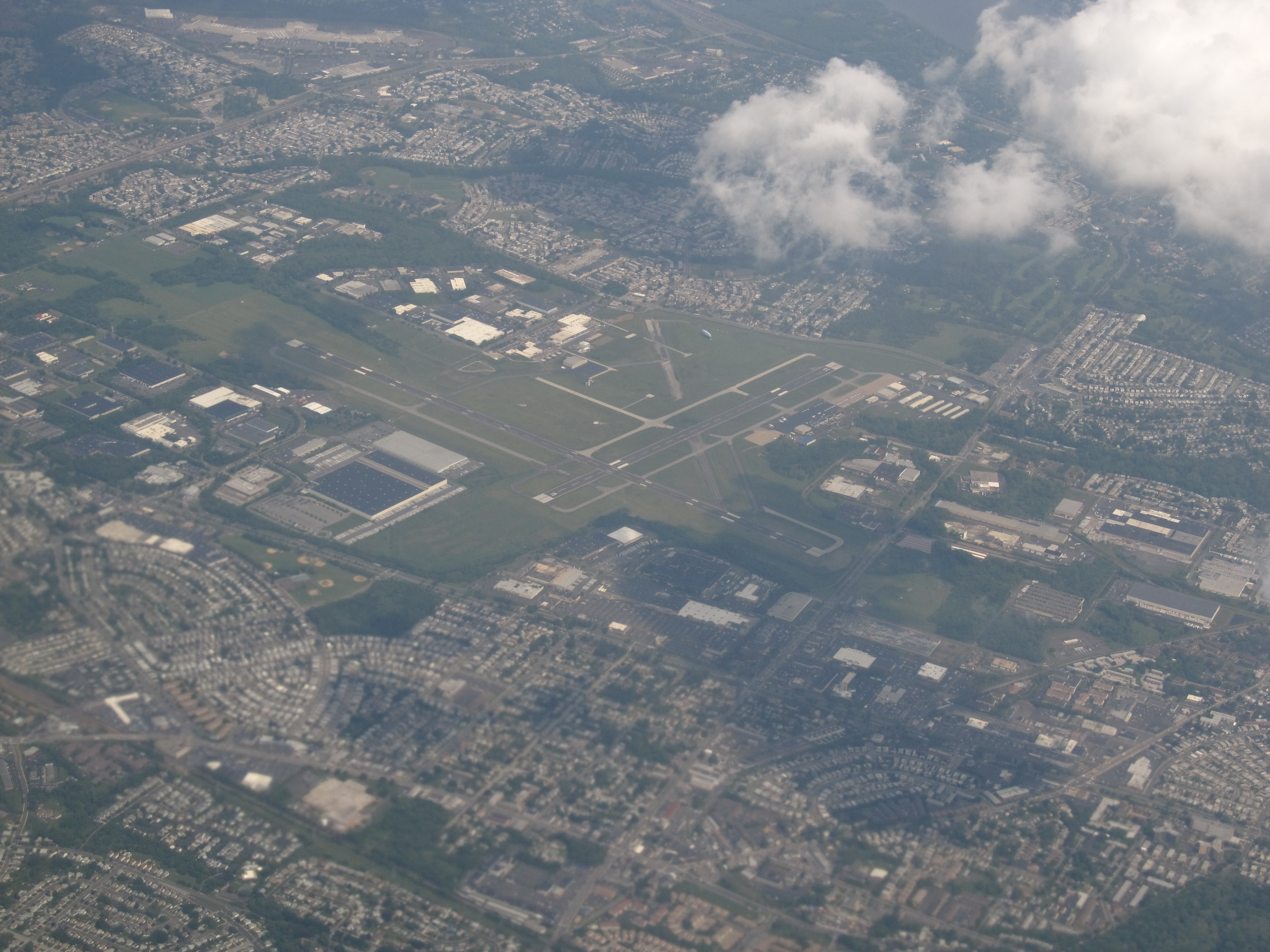
- Aerial view around the Northeast Philadelphia Airport

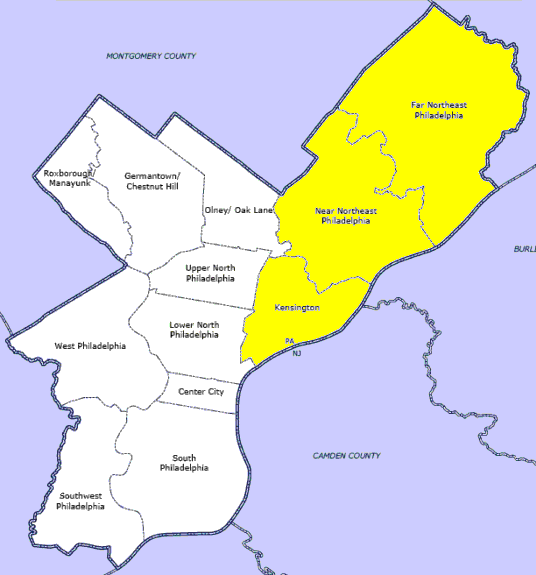
- Map of Philadelphia County with Northeast highlighted, which contains the lower Northeast neighborhood. Click for larger image.
- Country: United States of America
- State: Pennsylvania
- County: Philadelphia
- City: Philadelphia

Area
  - Total: 50.8 sq mi (132 km^{2})

Population (2010)
  - Total: 528,810
  - Density: 10,455/sq mi (4,037/km^{2})
- ZIP Code: 19111, 19114, 19115, 19116, 19124, 19135, 19136, 19149, 19152, 19154

Northeast Philadelphia, nicknamed Northeast Philly, the Great Northeast, and known colloquially as simply "the Northeast", is a section of Philadelphia, Pennsylvania. According to the 2000 census, Northeast Philadelphia has a population of between 300,000 and 450,000, depending on how the area is defined. The Northeast is known as being home to a large Irish Catholic and Irish American working class population, but is also home to a diverse community of Polish, German, Jewish, Russian, African American, Egyptian, Brazilian, Puerto Rican, Dominican, Guatemalan, Ukrainian, Indian, Chinese, and Vietnamese neighborhoods.

== Geography ==
Because of the large size of the Northeast, the Philadelphia City Planning Commission divides it into two regions called Lower Northeast and Far Northeast, the names being derived from their distance from Center City. The term Near Northeast is not widely used colloquially; Lower Northeast is more commonly used, but the term Far Northeast is in widespread use. The demarcation line between the two sections is typically given as Pennypack Creek.

Northeast Philadelphia is bounded by the Delaware River on the east, Bucks County on the north, and Montgomery County on the west. The southern limit is given as Frankford/Tacony Creek or Adams Avenue.

=== Lower Northeast ===
- Burholme
- Castor Garden
- Crescentville
- Fox Chase
- Frankford
- Holmesburg
- Juniata
- Lawncrest
- Lawndale
- Lexington Park
- Mayfair
- Northwood
- Oxford Circle
- Rhawnhurst
- Ryers
- Tacony
- Wissinoming
- Bridesburg

=== Far Northeast ===
- Academy Gardens
- Ashton-Woodenbridge
- Bustleton
- Byberry
- Crestmont Farms
- Holme Circle
- Krewstown
- Millbrook
- Modena Park
- Morrell Park
- Normandy
- Parkwood
- Pennypack
- Pine Valley
- Somerton
- Torresdale
- Upper Holmesburg
- Winchester Park

== History ==
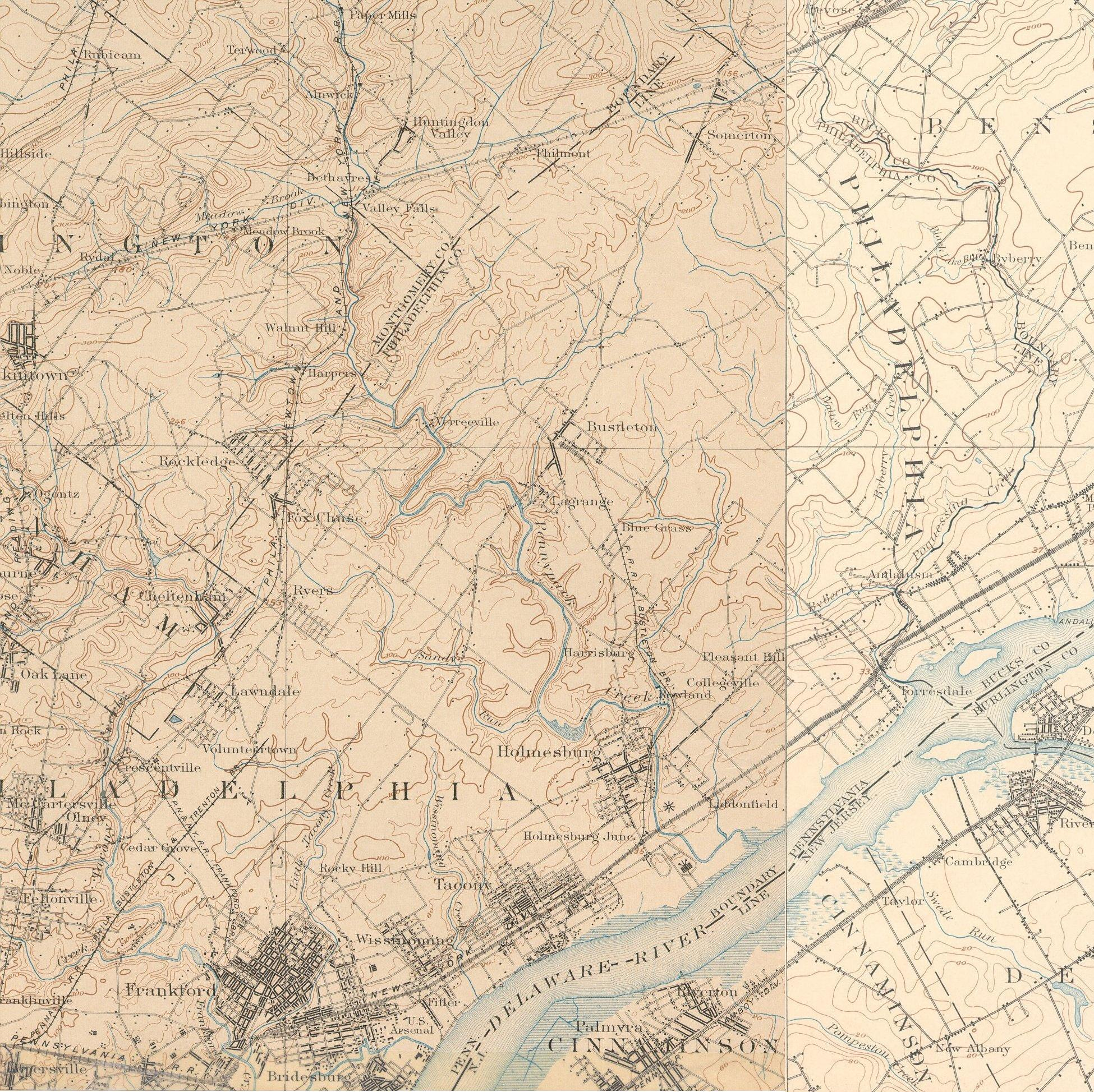
Northeast Philadelphia in 1900 when the region was still a collection of towns and farms

=== Early European settlement ===
The first European settlement in the Northeast was by Swedish farmers, who emigrated there when the area was a part of the New Sweden colony. They were followed by English Quakers, including Thomas Holme, who came to begin the settlement of William Penn's Pennsylvania colony in the late 1680s. In the years to follow, Northeast Philadelphia developed as a scattering of small towns and farms that were a part of Philadelphia County, but not the City of Philadelphia. Before consolidation with the City, what is now referred to as the Northeast consisted of the townships of Byberry, Delaware, Lower Dublin, Moreland, and Oxford, (largely rural areas); and the boroughs of Bridesburg, Frankford, and White Hall, which were more urbanized.

=== Growth in industry and farming ===
While most of the land in what is now the Northeast was dedicated to farming, the presence of many creeks, along with proximity to Philadelphia proper, made the towns of the Northeast suitable for industrial development. The Northeast's first factory was the Rowland Shovel Works on the Pennypack Creek. In 1802, it produced the first shovel made in the United States. More mills and factories followed along the Pennypack and Frankford Creeks, and traces of the mill races and dams remain to this day. The most famous of these factories was the Disston Saw Works in Tacony, founded by English industrialist Henry Disston, whose saw blades were world-renowned.

=== Consolidation and population increase ===
By 1854, Philadelphia County was incorporated into the city. In spite of the political incorporation, the Northeast retained its old development patterns for a time, and the dense populations and urban style of housing that marked older, more traditional sections of the city had not yet found their way there. In the first three decades of the 20th century, rapid industrialization led to the growth of industrial sections of the northeast and the neighborhoods surrounding them. These demographic changes, along with the building of the Market-Frankford Line train and new arterial highways, such as the Roosevelt Boulevard, brought new middle class populations to the lower half of the Northeast. Vast tracts of row homes were built in that section of the Northeast for new arrivals in the 1920s and 1930s, typically with small, but valued front lawns, which impart a "garden suburb" quality to much of the Northeast, reducing the sense of physical density felt elsewhere in the city. Much of this development occurred east of Roosevelt Boulevard (Mayfair, Torresdale) and in Oxford Circle.

=== Post-war growth ===
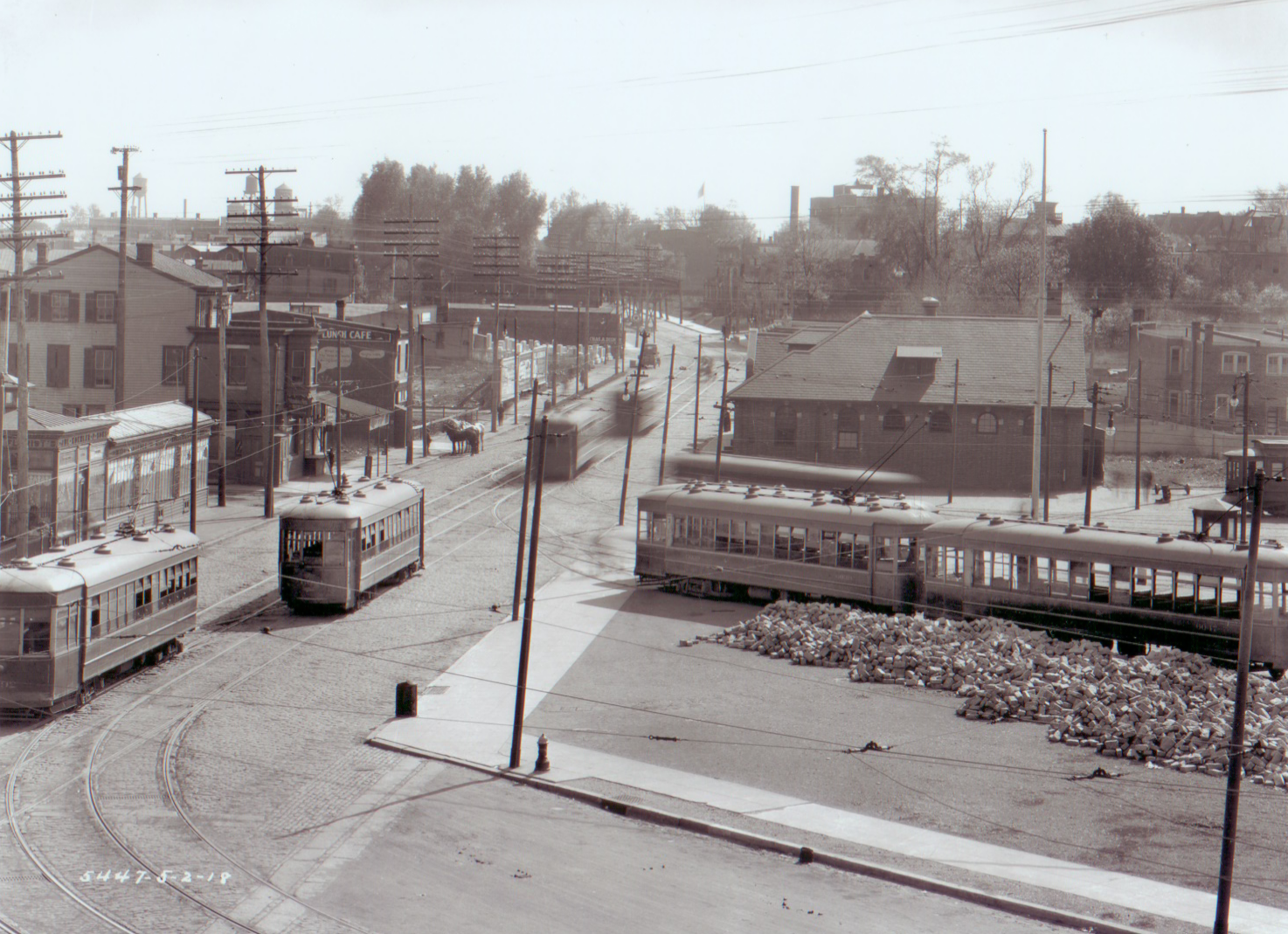
Frankford Terminal in 1918, before the construction of the Market–Frankford Line

After World War II, newer arrivals, armed with the mortgage benefits of the GI Bill, brought the baby boom to the Northeast. This newer population was heavily Jewish or ethnic Catholic (including Irish, Italian, Polish, and German Americans) and completed the development of the region, filling in undeveloped areas of Rhawnhurst and Bell's Corner and developing the previously rural Far Northeast. As older sections of the city lost populations of young families, the Northeast's school-age population swelled, requiring rapid expansion of schools, libraries, cinemas, shopping, transportation, restaurants and other needed amenities.

The period from 1945 through the 1970s was marked in many American cities by urban decline in older, more industrial areas. This was especially true in Philadelphia, in which much of the city's North, West and South sections lost population, factories, jobs and commerce. During the postwar period, the Northeast experienced a heavy influx of growing middle-class families, and had become an almost exclusively white community. This aroused controversy in the 1960s and 1970s, as passions for and against school busing were focused on the Northeast, to address racial imbalances, especially in the city's public schools. That racial imbalance was ultimately addressed by the upward mobility enjoyed by many of the graduates of the Northeast's excellent public and parochial school systems, who made their way out of the Northeast and into the suburbs from the 1980s onward, making room for new arrivals from the city's Latino, African American and Asian populations.

=== A separate identity ===
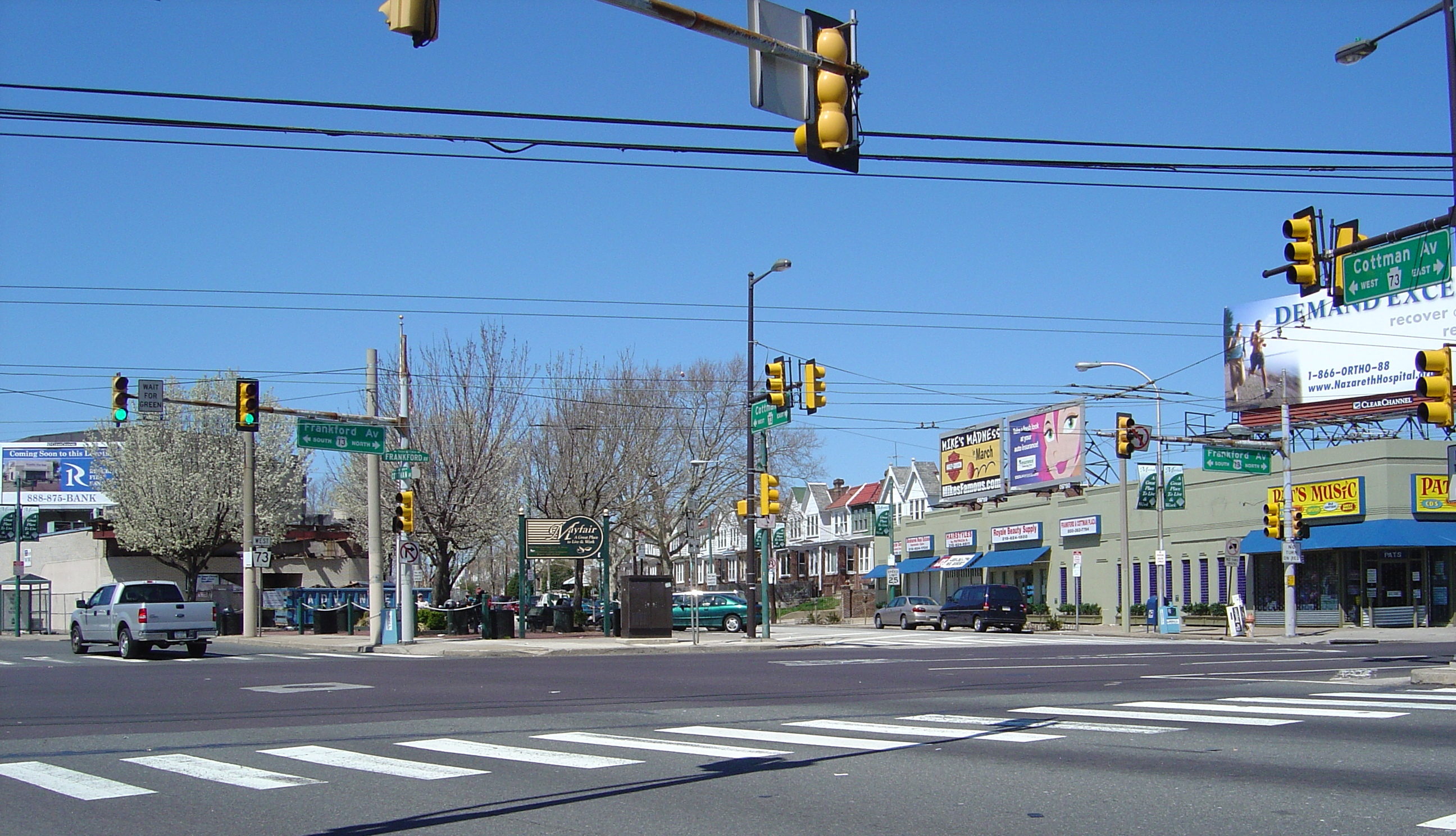
Frankford and Cottman Avenues, a central location in the Northeast

In the 1980s, the Northeast developed along a separate path from much of the rest of the city. In addition to the racial differences mentioned above, the political climate in the Northeast was balanced evenly between Republicans and Democrats, while the rest of the city almost uniformly voted for the latter party. As a result, many Northeasters became more and more discontented with the high city taxes and a perceived imbalance in the services they received for them. This discontent grew to give rise to a secessionist movement, led by State Senator Frank "Hank" Salvatore, among others. Salvatore introduced a bill in the State Senate to allow the Northeast to become a separate county called Liberty County, but the bill failed to progress beyond this stage. As the Philadelphia economy grew stronger, and most discontented people fled to the suburbs, and a new, more popular mayor, Ed Rendell, was elected, the call for secession waned, and the section settled back into life as a part of the city.

Today, the Northeast enjoys greater racial balance and relative stability. The region is uniformly developed, but like many American urban communities, it has witnessed the loss of manufacturing, factory conversions to marginal retail "outlets," and growing vacancies along shopping avenues, especially in the southern part of the region. During the housing boom of the first decade of the 21st century, property tax advantages granted to new construction within the city limits led to a growth in residential units and an escalation of existing home prices in the Northeast.

== Demographics ==
According to the 2010 census, 432,073 people live in the Northeast section of Philadelphia. (Map)

By 2018 immigration and ethnic diversity had increased in the region.

=== Racial demographics ===
- Non-Hispanic White: 252,022 (58.3%)
- Non-Hispanic Black: 77,681 (18.0%)
- Hispanic or Latino of any race: 60,020 (13.9%)
- Asian: 31,658 (7.3%)
- Mixed or Other: 10,692 (2.5%)
- Native American: 7,777 (1.8%)

==== Irish Americans ====
The spur of the Irish Famine drew many Irish immigrants to the city.

Today, the Irish in Philadelphia make up 14.2% of the city's population, the largest ethnicity in the city. Although there are Irish in almost every area of the city, they still are predominantly located within Northeast Philadelphia, especially in neighborhoods such as Kensington, Fishtown, and Mayfair.

== Political representation and government ==
While Philadelphia as a whole is heavily Democratic, there is consistent competition between Republicans and Democrats in some parts of the Northeast. Republicans currently hold one State House seat, and a portion of another, in the Northeast and one non at-large Philadelphia City Council seat. As of 2019, no Republican represents any part of the Northeast in the United States Congress.

=== U.S. House of Representatives ===
All of Northeast Philadelphia is in the 2nd congressional district of Pennsylvania, and is currently represented by Brendan Boyle.

=== Pennsylvania legislature ===
==== Senate ====
In the Pennsylvania State Senate, most of the Northeast is in the 5th district, represented by Republican Joe Picozzi. Smaller parts are represented by Democrats Sharif Street (the 3rd district) and Tina Tartaglione (the 2nd district).

==== House of Representatives ====
The Northeast is split among several State House districts, including those of Democrats Ed Neilson, Kevin Boyle, Pat Gallagher, Jared Solomon, Jason Dawkins, Anthony Bellmon, and Joseph Hohenstein, and Republican Martina White.

=== Philadelphia City Council ===
In the Philadelphia City Council, the Far Northeast is represented by the 10th district councilman, Republican Brian O'Neill. The Lower Northeast is divided among five other council districts, all represented by Democrats, including the 1st, represented by Mark Squilla, the 5th, represented by Council President Darrell Clarke, the 6th, represented by Michael Driscoll, the 7th, represented by Maria Quiñones-Sanchez, and the 9th, represented by Anthony Phillips.

== Public safety ==
The Philadelphia Police Department patrols four districts within its Northeast Division, including the 7th and 8th districts in the Far Northeast, and the 2nd and 15th in the Near Northeast.

== Economy and attractions ==
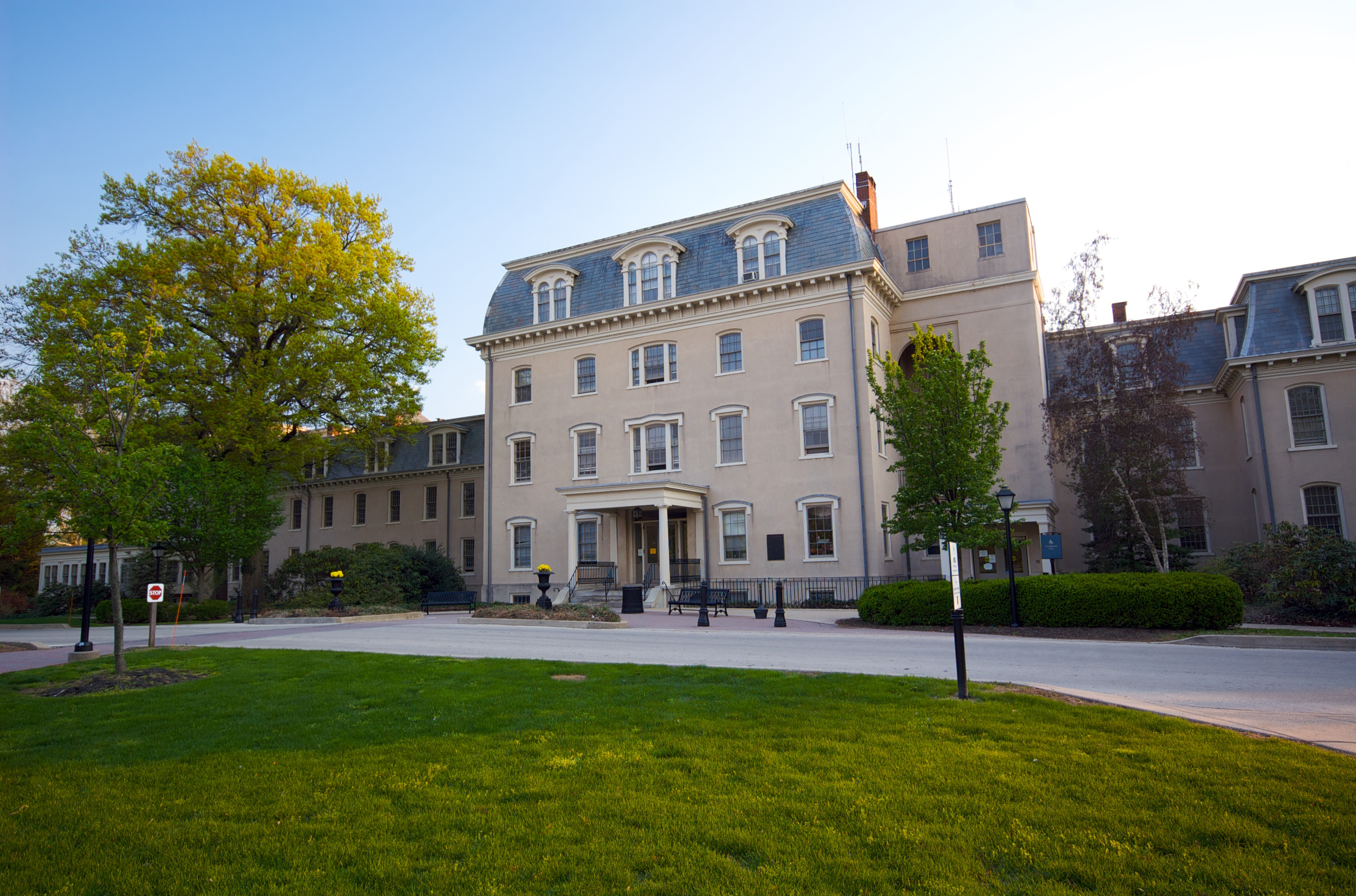
Friends Hospital, founded in 1813 by Quakers

Northeast Philadelphia is home to Philadelphia Mills, formerly known as Franklin Mills, a shopping mall that was built on what was once Liberty Bell Park Racetrack, and is one of the most visited attractions in the state. The lower sections of the Northeast still boast pleasant shopping avenues lined by stores and restaurants, such as Castor Avenue. Major shopping centers along Cottman Avenue include, the Cottman-Bustleton Center, and the Roosevelt Mall which opened in 1964 at Cottman Avenue and the Roosevelt Boulevard.

Also present in the Northeast are two nationally recognized medical establishments, Friends Hospital and Fox Chase Cancer Center.

Prior to its disestablishment, Ransome Airlines had its headquarters on the grounds of Northeast Philadelphia Airport.

== Education ==
The first school was founded in the Northeast in 1723 by Silas Crispin, Thomas Holme's son-in-law. The Northeast is home to Fox Chase Farm, an educational facility that is one of two working farms left in the Philadelphia city limits.

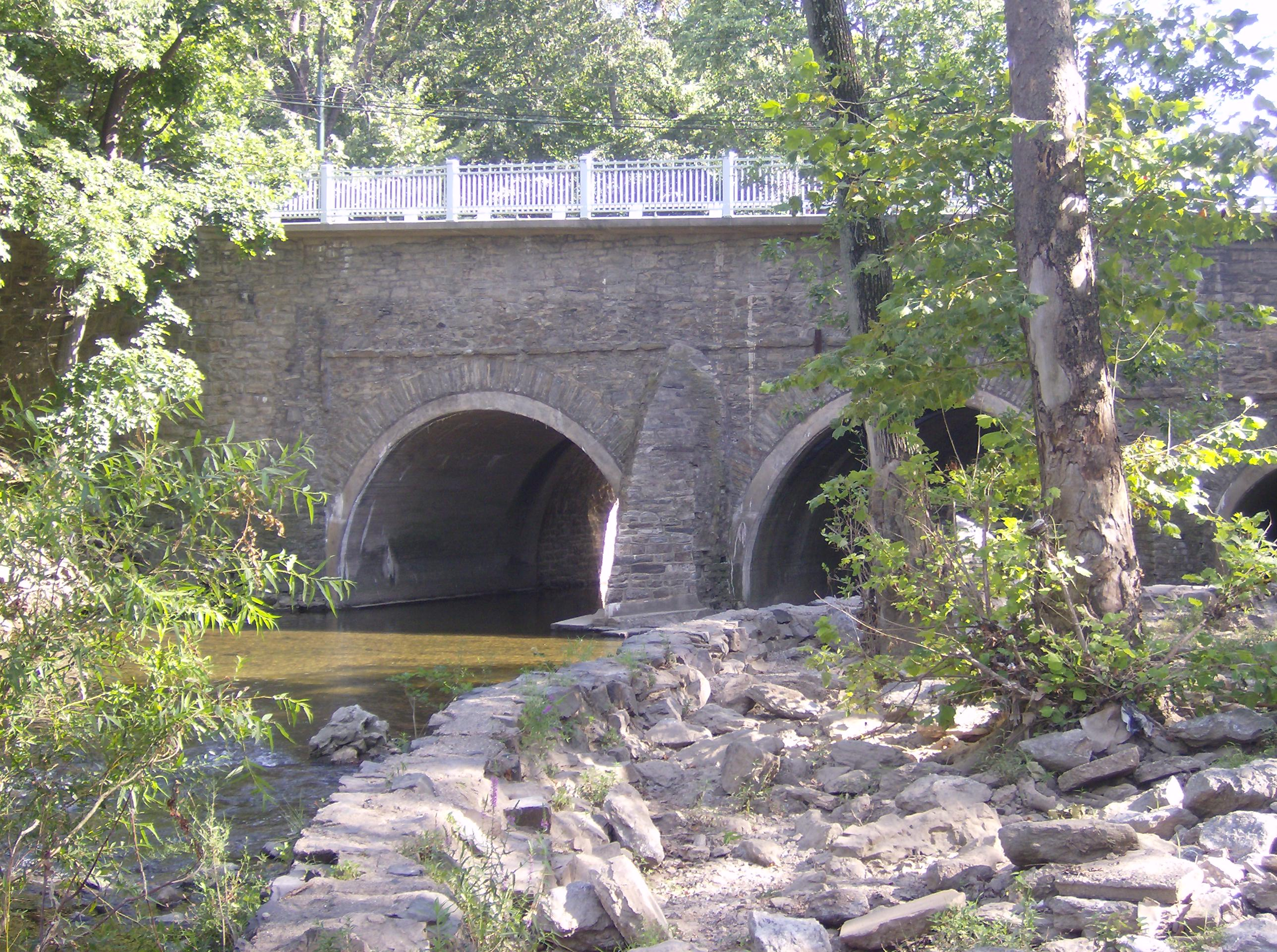
Frankford Avenue Bridge over Pennypack Creek in Holmesburg

=== Colleges and universities ===
The main campus of Holy Family University is located in Northeast Philadelphia. The university, founded in 1954, has more than two thousand students.

=== Primary and secondary schools ===
The School District of Philadelphia operates public schools in the area. Public high schools in the area include Northeast, Abraham Lincoln, Samuel S. Fels High School, Frankford, George Washington, and Swenson. Several publicly funded charter high schools also operate in Northeast Philadelphia, including Philadelphia Academy, MaST, Franklin Towne and Maritime Academy Charter High School. Northeast Philadelphia is also home to a public magnet school, The Arts Academy at Benjamin Rush.

The Roman Catholic Archdiocese of Philadelphia operates Catholic schools. Catholic high schools in Northeast Philadelphia include St. Hubert Catholic High School for Girls, Father Judge, Cardinal Dougherty, Northeast Catholic, and Archbishop Ryan. It was announced in October 2009 that both Cardinal Dougherty and Northeast Catholic would be closed due to decreasing enrollments. Nazareth Academy is an independent Catholic high school founded and operated by the Sisters of the Holy Family of Nazareth.

== News media ==
A free weekly newspaper, the Northeast Times, is distributed throughout the Northeast. A second free newspaper, the Northeast News Gleaner, was also printed there until it closed December 11, 2008. Two citywide newspapers, The Philadelphia Inquirer and Philadelphia Daily News, both dailies, also cover the Northeast.

== Recreation ==
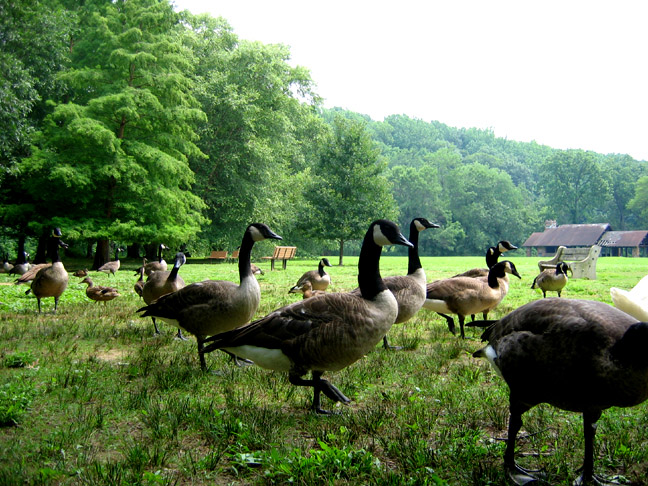
Pennypack Park in Fox Chase

A prominent geographic feature and recreation destination in Northeast Philadelphia is Pennypack Creek, which runs through Pennypack Park. The park's 1,600 acres (6.5 km^{2}) of woodlands span the width of the Northeast, and serve as a natural oasis amid urban development. The park is home to the oldest stone arch bridge still in use in the United States, built in 1697 on what is now Frankford Avenue. The section is also home to many playgrounds and smaller parks, including Burholme Park.

== Transportation ==
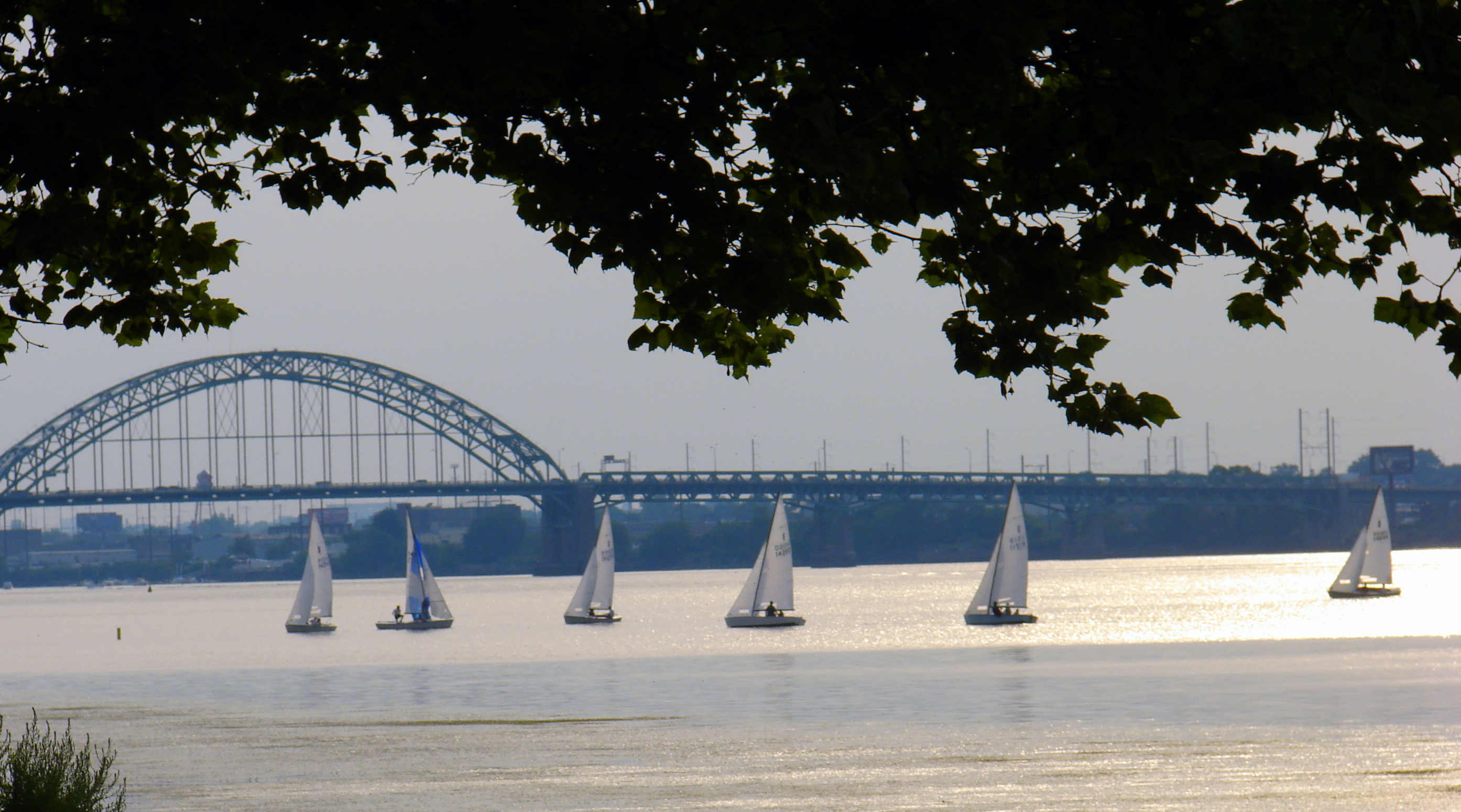
Tacony–Palmyra Bridge connects Northeast Philadelphia with New Jersey.

The Northeast's main highways are Interstate 95 (Delaware Expressway) and Roosevelt Boulevard (US 1). Secondary major arteries include Cottman Avenue (Pennsylvania Route 73), Frankford Avenue (US 13), Woodhaven Road (PA 63), Grant Avenue, Oxford Avenue (PA 232), State Road, Bustleton Avenue (PA 532), Bridge Street, Harbison Avenue, and Academy Road.

The Tacony-Palmyra Bridge, the only Delaware River crossing in Philadelphia not operated by the Delaware River Port Authority (thus resulting in a cheaper toll), allows one to drive between the Tacony section of the city and Palmyra, New Jersey.

The Northeast is also served by SEPTA's Market-Frankford Line, often called the "Frankford El" or "the El" because portions of the rail line are elevated above streets below, including Frankford and Kensington avenues. The northernmost and easternmost terminus of the line is at the Frankford Transportation Center, Frankford Avenue and Bridge Street. Three commuter rail lines also serve the Northeast. An extension of the Broad Street Line along Roosevelt Boulevard has been proposed, Roosevelt Boulevard Subway. Many SEPTA bus routes and all three of its trackless trolley routes run through the Northeast, although north-south buses run more frequently than west-east ones. Most north-south routes terminate at the Frankford Transportation Center.

One of two airports that serve Philadelphia, Northeast Philadelphia Airport (PNE), is located in this section of the city. PNE is the sixth busiest airport in Pennsylvania.

== Notable people ==
- Eddie Alvarez, former Bellator and UFC Lightweight Champion
- Rubén Amaro Jr., MLB baseball player, general manager, and coach
- Ed Bassmaster, YouTuber
- Marie-Helene Bertino, novelist and short story writer
- Gia Carangi, considered by some to be the first supermodel, one of the first famous women to die of AIDS
- Richard Costello, Philadelphia police officer, former President of the Philadelphia Lodge of the Fraternal Order of Police
- Jack "Legs" Diamond, prohibition era gangster
- St. Katherine Drexel, Roman Catholic Saint
- Michael Driscoll, Philadelphia City Councilmember
- Bobby Henon, former member of City Council
- Bil Keane, creator of Family Circus comic strips
- Rich Gannon, former NFL quarterback and 2002 NFL MVP
- Jonathan Loughran, actor
- Chris Matthews, political commentator
- Andrea McArdle, singer and actress
- Kathleen McGinty, 2016 US Senate Candidate
- Patrick Murphy, former Secretary of the Army
- Chris McKendry, ESPN anchor
- Chris Mooney, coach at the University of Richmond
- Bob Saget, actor
- Sylvester Stallone, actor
- Jayson Stark, sportswriter and J. G. Taylor Spink Award-winner
- Frank Wycheck, former NFL tight end

== See also ==
- Historical Society of Frankford, founded 1905
- National Register of Historic Places listings in Northeast Philadelphia
- Philadelphia Prison System
