= Northeast News Gleaner =

- Type: Weekly newspaper
- Founder: Henry family
- Founded: 1882; 143 years ago
- Ceased publication: 2008
- Language: English
- City: Philadelphia, Pennsylvania
- Country: United States
- Website: www.newsgleaner.com (former)

The Northeast News Gleaner was an American newspaper that billed itself as "the oldest weekly newspaper in Northeast Philadelphia". It operated for more than a century.

== History ==
Known informally as the News Gleaner, and founded in 1882 by the Henry family, the publication operated from the Frankford Section of Philadelphia for 117 years. The company moved to a 32,000-square-foot (3,000 m^{2}) building on Gantry Road in the Far Northeast in March 1999.

In 2002, News Gleaner Publications was purchased by the Journal Register Company; combined with the Northeast Breeze and the Olney Times, Journal Register's weeklies had a collective circulation of more than 120,000.

On December 11, 2008, due to the economic crisis and the inability to sell the newspaper group, the papers were closed and employees were told to clear out their desks immediately without warning, one day after the paper printed what turned out to be their last issue.

== See also ==
- Northeast Times
- Philadelphia Inquirer
