= Saunders Park =

Saunders Park may refer to:

- Saunders Park (Nova Scotia), municipal park in Halifax
- Saunders Park, Philadelphia, neighborhood
