= Lexington Park, Philadelphia =

Lexington Park
- Neighborhood of Philadelphia
- Location within Philadelphia
- Coordinates: 40.053°N 75.047°W
- Country: United States
- State: Pennsylvania
- County: Philadelphia County
- City: Philadelphia
- Area codes: 215, 267 and 445

Lexington Park is a neighborhood in the Northeast section of Philadelphia, Pennsylvania, United States. It is bounded on the west by Roosevelt Boulevard, and on the north, east and south by Pennypack Park. The neighborhood is made up mostly of twin and single homes built in the years following World War II, and a few apartment buildings built not long thereafter. There are some commercial establishments along Rhawn Street and Roosevelt Boulevard. Convenience to the park makes it an attractive location for families with children. Lexington Park is also home to Nazareth Hospital.
