= Ryers, Philadelphia =

Ryers
- Neighborhood of Philadelphia
- Location within Philadelphia
- Country: United States
- State: Pennsylvania
- County: Philadelphia
- City: Philadelphia
- Area codes: 215, 267 and 445

Ryers is a neighborhood in Northeast Philadelphia, Pennsylvania, United States. It is bounded by Cottman Avenue (PA 73) on the southwest and Fillmore Street on the northwest. Both of these highways separate Philadelphia from Cheltenham and Rockledge, Montgomery County.

The Fox Chase Line separates Ryers from Burholme and Fox Chase borders it via Hartel St. on the northeast. Ryers station is at Cottman and Rockwell Avenues.

== History ==
The name Ryers was derived from the Ryerss Estate, which is located in Burholme Park along Central Avenue. The estate was owned by Joseph Waln Ryerss, who left it to his son Robert, a lawyer. Eight months before he died at the age of sixty-five, Robert Ryerss shocked Philadelphia society by marrying his housekeeper of many years, Mary Ann Reed. His will stipulated that upon Mary Ann’s death, the estate was to be turned over to the city of Philadelphia to be used as a park, library and museum "free to the public." Before she died, however, Mary Ann Ryerss remarried and then turned the property over to the city of Philadelphia in 1905. The Ryerss Museum and Library was opened to the public in 1910 under the administration of the Fairmount Park Commission. Who later left it to the Free Library of Philadelphia.
