= Upper Holmesburg, Philadelphia =

Upper Holmesburg
- Neighborhood of Philadelphia
- Location within Philadelphia
- Country: United States
- State: Pennsylvania
- County: Philadelphia County
- City: Philadelphia
- Area codes: 215, 267, and 445

Upper Holmesburg is a neighborhood in Northeast Philadelphia, Pennsylvania, United States. It is located along the Delaware River and Pennypack Creek, from Frankford Avenue to Willits Road. St. Dominic Roman Catholic parish is located in this section, on the 8500 block of Frankford Avenue.
