= French Quarter, Philadelphia =

Neighborhood in Pennsylvania, United States

French Quarter
- Neighborhood of Philadelphia
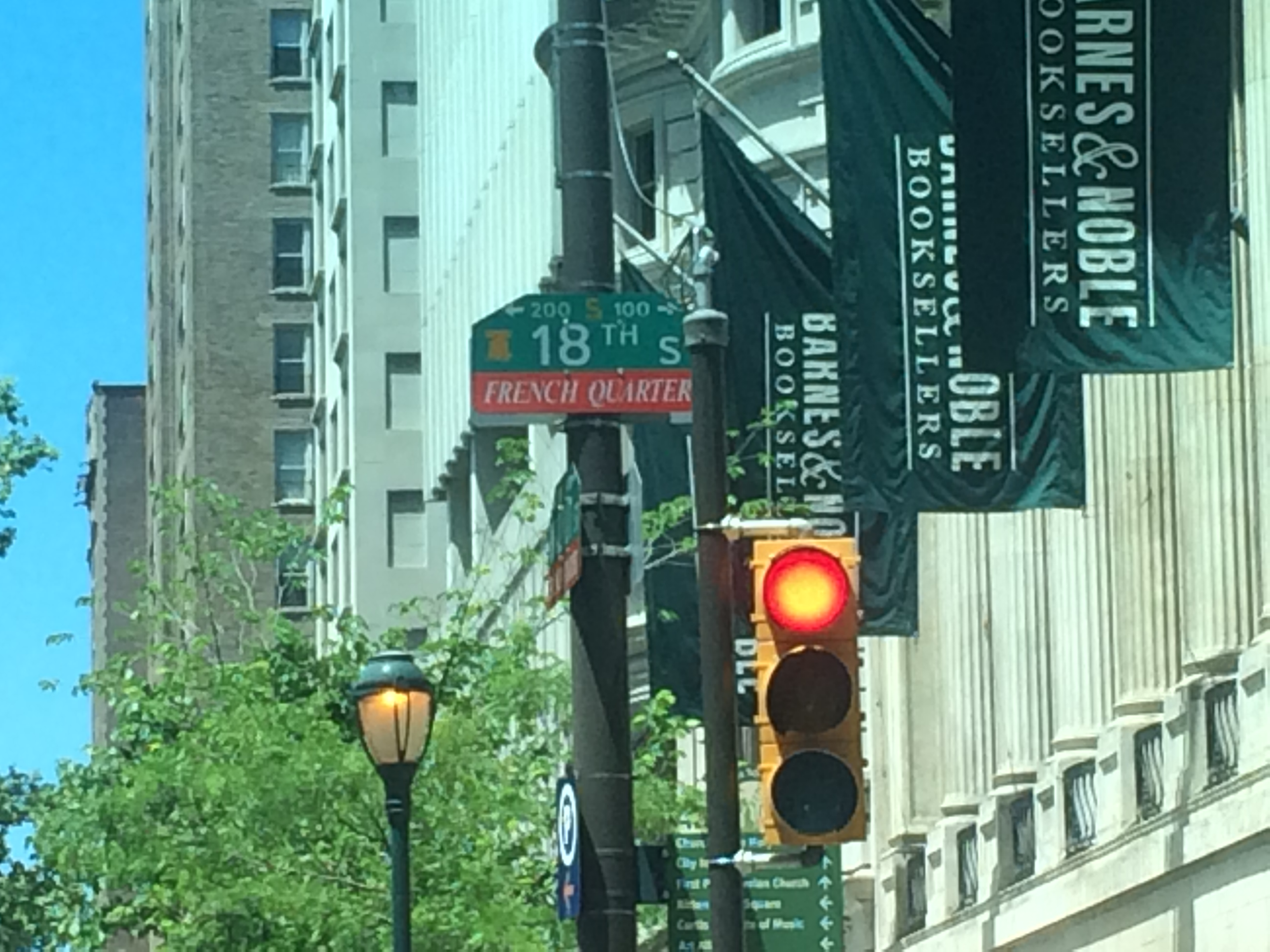
- French Quarter, June 2014.

- Location in Philadelphia
- Coordinates: 39°57′01″N 75°10′11″W
- Country: United States
- State: Pennsylvania
- County: Philadelphia
- City: Philadelphia
- Area codes: 215, 267 and 445

The French Quarter is an official city-designated district of Philadelphia, Pennsylvania spanning the area between 17th and 19th Streets east and west and Walnut and Sansom Streets from north to south. The designation was made official in 1999. According to City Paper, the Philadelphia French Quarter "... is one of the few places outside France that supports a thriving French culture" even though "it remains largely unrecognized by both tourists and natives". The area is closely tied to the culture of Rittenhouse Square.

== History ==
Writer Dan Rottenberg says he coined the term in the July 1998 issue of Philadelphia magazine.

In 1999, in advance of the Republican National Convention the following year, the city added subtle orange signs saying "French Quarter" below the traditional green streets signs in the area. The designation is a tribute to the French culture that has shaped Philadelphia and is based on the establishment of three French restaurants and a creperie in the area in the 1990s.

In 2023, Billy Penn reported skeptically on the designation, noting that the name of the quarter was unfamiliar to most residents and, other than a French hotel chain, few French-owned or influenced businesses remained in the area.
