= Ashton-Woodenbridge, Philadelphia =

Ashton-Woodenbridge
- Neighborhood
- Location within Philadelphia
- Country: United States
- State: Pennsylvania
- County: Philadelphia
- City: Philadelphia
- Area codes: 215, 267 and 445

Ashton-Woodenbridge (also known as Ashton-Wooden Bridge and Pennypack) is a neighborhood in Northeast Philadelphia, in the U.S. state of Pennsylvania. It is located on the eastern side of the far northeast, in the vicinity of Northeast Philadelphia Airport, including Wooden Bridge Run west to Academy Gardens, and south to Pennypack Park. Originally farm land, it was part of the holdings of Thomas Holme, surveyor for Philadelphia's founder, William Penn. The area was part of one of the original townships, Lower Dublin Township, until the 1854 Act of Consolidation incorporated it into the City of Philadelphia.

Holme emancipated his slaves upon his death, and their descendants owned much of the area. Remnants of their community can still be seen near present-day Holme Circle, where stood a village formerly called Harrisburg. Their tiny Bethany A.M.E. Church, located on Ashton Road, at least unofficially rivals Mother Bethel A.M.E. as the oldest African-American church.

"Woodenbridge" is from Wooden Bridge Run, a creek that flows through the north of the area, a tributary of Pennypack Creek. The name "Ashton-Woodenbridge" first came into use in the 1970s to honor the Ashton Family whose progenitor, Joseph Ashton, settled on Pennypack Creek before William Penn arrived.[As per Phil. History: Papers Read before the City History Society, "Joseph Ashton came to this country before Penn did and owned lands up the creek near Well Spring" p. 221.] His great-great grandson, also Joseph Ashton, owned a farm called River Dale, on the Delaware River, which is now the Torresdale Filter Plant . Other Ashtons settled in and around Ashton Road.

Active farms dotted the area as late as the early 1960s and horse-drawn wagons frequently served as local transit during snowy weather, navigating the steep Ashton Road to take workers to the bus stop at Holme Circle.

The area has long been served by freight railroad, and there remains active industry in the area. Crown, Cork, and Seal was a long-time anchor on Ashton Road, finally relocating their world headquarters north on a large campus.

Northeast Philadelphia Airport lies at the northern end of Ashton Road at Grant Avenue. Originally a World War II airbase, it now serves as a general-aviation reliever airport for Philadelphia International Airport. Despite having no scheduled passenger service, it is the sixth-busiest airport in Pennsylvania.

The area was settled in earnest by veterans of World War II during the dramatic expansion of the Northeast. The housing stock is primarily twins, row homes, townhouses, and apartments.
