= List of Philadelphia neighborhoods =

Unofficial map of the neighborhoods of Philadelphia

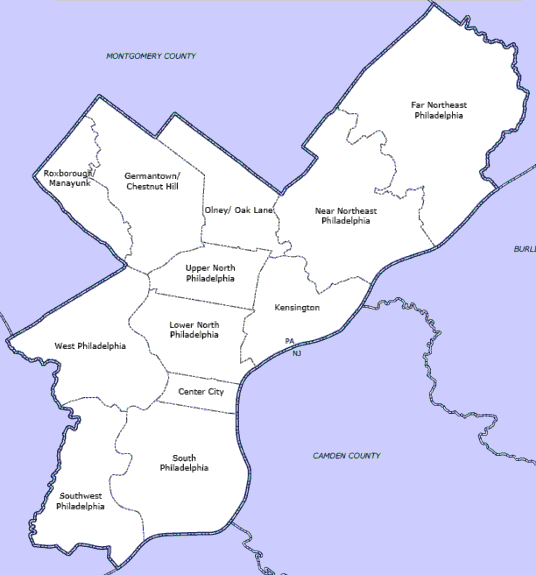
Philadelphia Planning Analysis sections

The following is a list of neighborhoods, districts and other places located in the city of Philadelphia, Pennsylvania, United States. The list is organized by broad geographical sections within the city.

Common usage for Philadelphia's neighborhood names does not respect "official" borders used by the city's police, planning commission or other entities. Therefore, some of the places listed here may overlap geographically, and residents do not always agree where one neighborhood ends and another begins. Philadelphia has 41 ZIP-codes, which are often used for neighborhood analysis.

Historically, many neighborhoods were defined by incorporated townships (Blockley, Roxborough), districts (Belmont, Kensington, Moyamensing, Richmond) or boroughs (Bridesburg, Frankford, Germantown, Manayunk) before being incorporated into the city with the Act of Consolidation of 1854. Adding further complication is the fact that in some parts of Philadelphia, especially the central areas of North, West and South Philadelphia, residents have long been more likely to identify with the name of their section of the city than with any specific neighborhood name. Today, community development corporations, neighborhood watches and other civic organizations are influential in shaping the use of neighborhood names and approximate boundaries.

For planning purposes, the city is divided into 18 Planning Analysis Sections, which are Upper Far Northeast, Lower Far Northeast, Lower Northwest, Lower Southwest, University Southwest, West, West Park, Lower Northeast, River Wards, Lower North, North, Central, South, Lower South, Upper Northwest, Upper North, Central Northeast and North Delaware.

== Center City ==
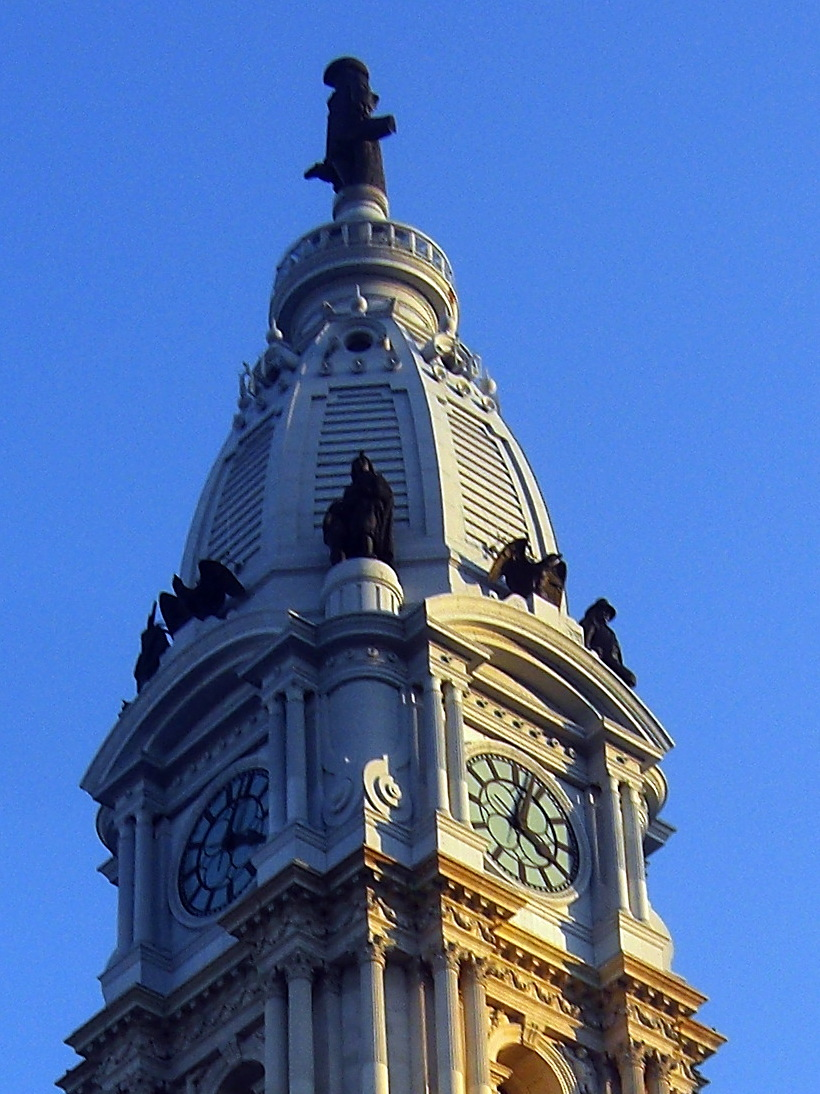
Philadelphia City Hall in Center City

The Center City Planning Analysis Section extends from South Street on the south to Vine Street on the north and from the Delaware River on the east to the Schuylkill River on the west.

- Avenue of the Arts
- Callowhill
- Chinatown
- Elfreth's Alley
- French Quarter
- Logan Square
- Naval Square
- Jewelers' Row
- Market East
- Old City
- Museum District
- Penn Center
- Rittenhouse Square
- Fitler Square: north to Locust Street, south to South Street, east to 21st Street, west to the Schuylkill River.
- Penn's Landing: encompassed by the Delaware Riverfront.
- Society Hill: north to Walnut St., south to Lombard St, east to Front Street, west to 8th St.
- South Street: along South Street from Front Street in the east to Seventh Street in the west.
- Washington Square West: north to Market St., south to South St., east to 7th St, west to Broad St. The name derives simply from the fact that this area extends west of Washington Square. Recently, this name is used in conjunction with a new name for the neighborhood - Midtown Village. The Gayborhood is entirely within this area.

== South Philadelphia ==
The South Philadelphia Planning Analysis Section is bounded by South Street on the north and the Delaware and Schuylkill Rivers to their confluence.

- Bella Vista: North to South Street, South to Washington Avenue, West to 11th Street, East to 6th Street
- Central South Philadelphia
- Christian Street Historic District
- Devil's Pocket: Irish neighborhood west of Grays Ferry Avenue
- Dickinson Square West - Diverse neighborhood. Washington to Mifflin, 4th to 6th.
- East Passyunk Crossing: North to Tasker Street, South to Snyder Avenue, West to Broad Street, East to 9th Street
- Franklin Delano Roosevelt Park
- Girard Estate
- Greenwich 4th to 9th Streets, Mifflin to Snyder
- Grays Ferry: north to Gray's Ferry Ave., south to Passyunk Ave., west to the Schuylkill River, east to 24th St.
- Hawthorne: from South St. to Washington Ave., Broad St. to 11th St.
- Italian Market: along 9th St. from Fitzwater St. in the north to Wharton St. in the south.
- Little Saigon
- Lower Moyamensing
- Marconi Plaza
- Moyamensing
- Packer Park
- Passyunk Square: Washington Ave. to Tasker St., 6th St. to Broad St.
- Pennsport: locally referred to as "Two Street", Penn's Port is a predominantly Irish-American Catholic neighborhood.
- Point Breeze
- Queen Village: north to Lombard St., south to Washington Ave., east to the Delaware River, west to 6th St.
- Schuylkill
- Sports Complex
- Tasker
- Wharton
- Whitman
- Wilson Park
- West Passyunk
- Southwark:The limits of the district started on Cedar (South) St. and the Delaware River and proceeded west to Passyunk Ave.; along the latter to Moyamensing Ave.; then by Keeler's Lane to Greenwich Road; then to the Delaware River and along the several courses of the same until reaching the beginning point again.
- Graduate Hospital: north to South St. (Rittenhouse/Fitler), south to Washington Ave., east to Broad St. (Hawthorne), west to 24th St. (Gray's Ferry)

== Southwest Philadelphia ==
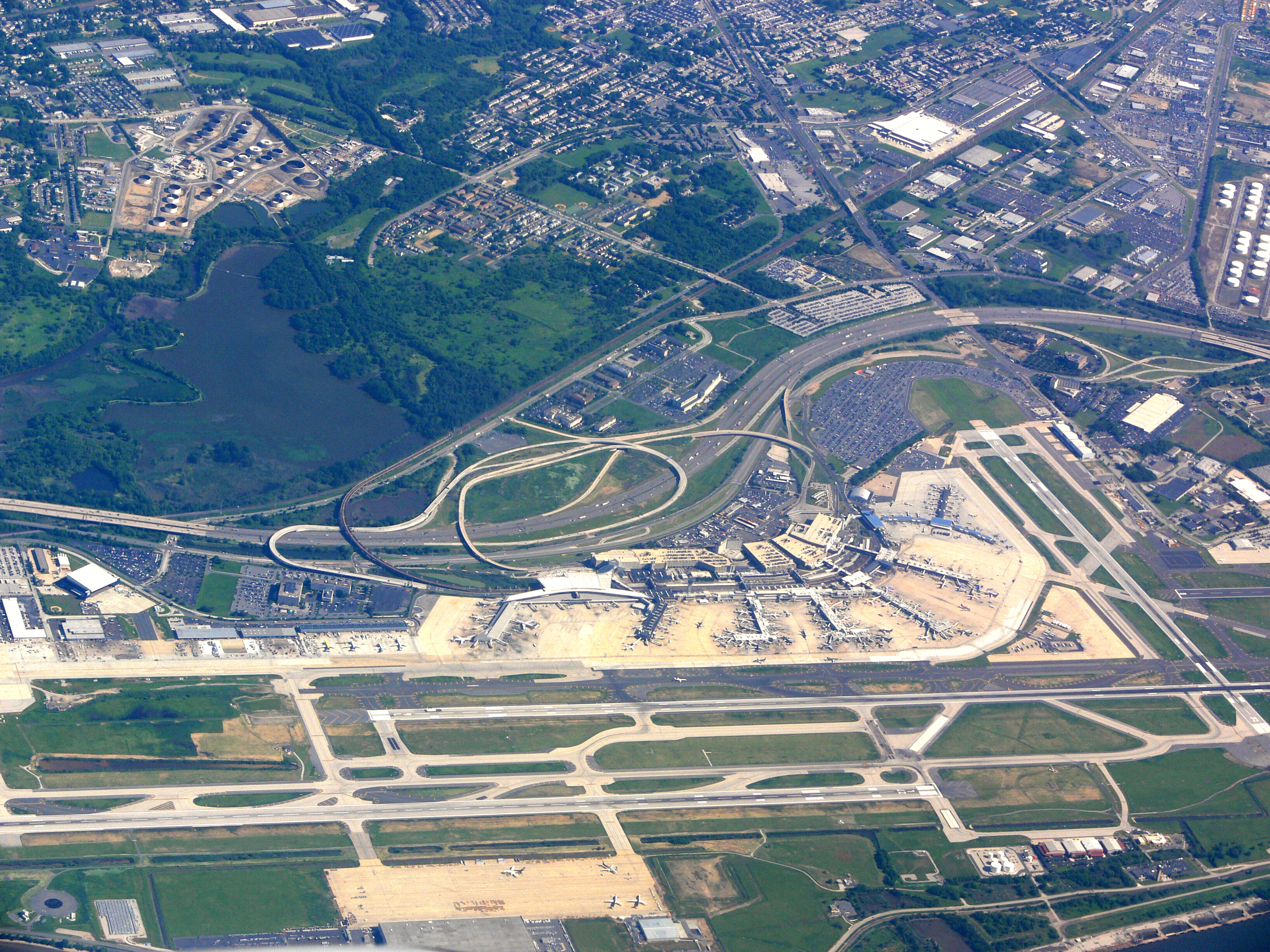
Philadelphia International Airport in Southwest Philadelphia

Southwest Philadelphia (formerly Kingsessing Township) is a section of Philadelphia, Pennsylvania that can be described as extending from the western side of the Schuylkill River to the city line, with the northern border defined by the Philadelphia City Planning Commission as east from the city line along Baltimore Avenue moving south along 51st Street to Springfield Ave. It follows the train tracks until 49th Street. From 49th and Kingsessing Ave the line moves east along Kingsessing Ave. The line then moves south along 46th St to Paschall Ave where it jogs to join Grays Ferry where the line runs to the Schuylkill River.

- Angora
- Bartram Village
- Clearview
- Kingsessing
- Eastwick
- Elmwood Park
- Hedgerow
- Mount Moriah
- Paschall
- Philadelphia International Airport
- Penrose
- Southwest Schuylkill
- Hog Island: historically the home to a major shipyard, now home to the Philadelphia International Airport

== West Philadelphia ==
West Philadelphia, nicknamed West Philly, is a section of Philadelphia. Though there is no official definition of its boundaries, it is generally considered to reach from the western shore of the Schuylkill River, to City Line Avenue to the northwest, Cobbs Creek to the southwest and the SEPTA Media/Wawa Line to the south.

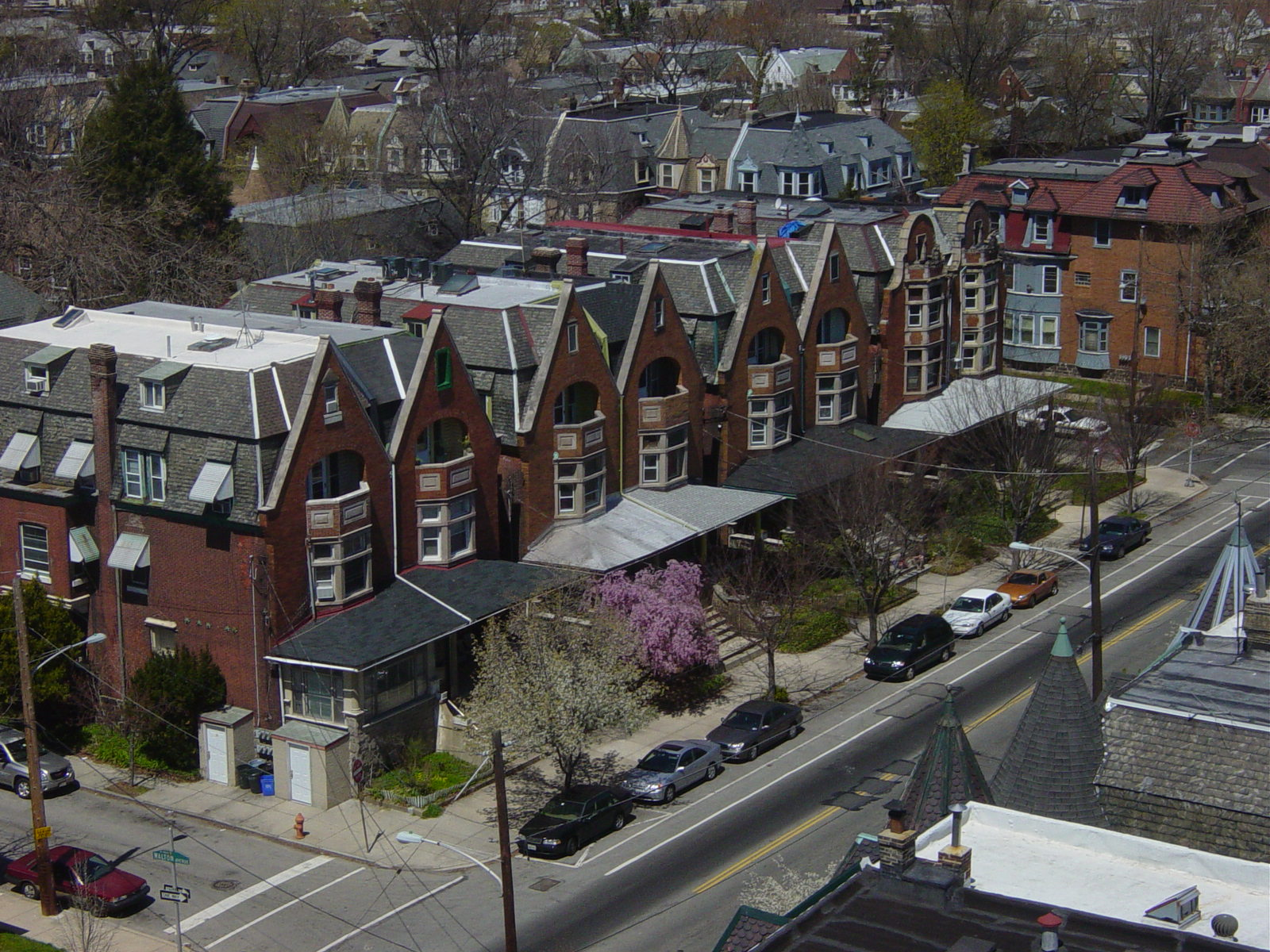
48th and Walton Streets, Cedar Park

- Belmont District: defunct
- Belmont Village
- Carroll Park
- Cathedral Park
- Cedar Park
- Centennial District
- Dunlap
- Garden Court
- Haddington
- Haverford North
- Mantua
- Mill Creek
- Overbrook
- Overbrook Park
- Overbrook Farms
- Parkside
- Powelton Village
- Saunders Park
- Spruce Hill
- Squirrel Hill
- University City
- Walnut Hill
- Woodland Terrace
- Wynnefield Heights
- Cobbs Creek: East to 52nd Street, west to Cobbs Creek, north to Market Street, south to Baltimore Avenue
- Wynnefield: East to 53rd Street and Fairmount Park, West to 59th Street, North to City Avenue, south to Fairmount Park

== Lower North Philadelphia ==
Lower North Philadelphia is a section of Philadelphia that is immediately north of Center City and below Upper North Philadelphia and can be described as a section of Philadelphia that was designated as a "Model City" target, in hopes of overcoming poverty and blight through a federal funding program since 1966. Bounded by Spring Garden Street to the south, Front Street to the east, York Street to the north and Fairmount Park to the west.

- Brewerytown
- Cecil B. Moore
- Hartranft
- Ludlow
- Poplar
- Sharswood
- Spring Garden
- Stanton
- Strawberry Mansion
- Yorktown
- Fairmount
- Northern Liberties

== Upper North Philadelphia ==
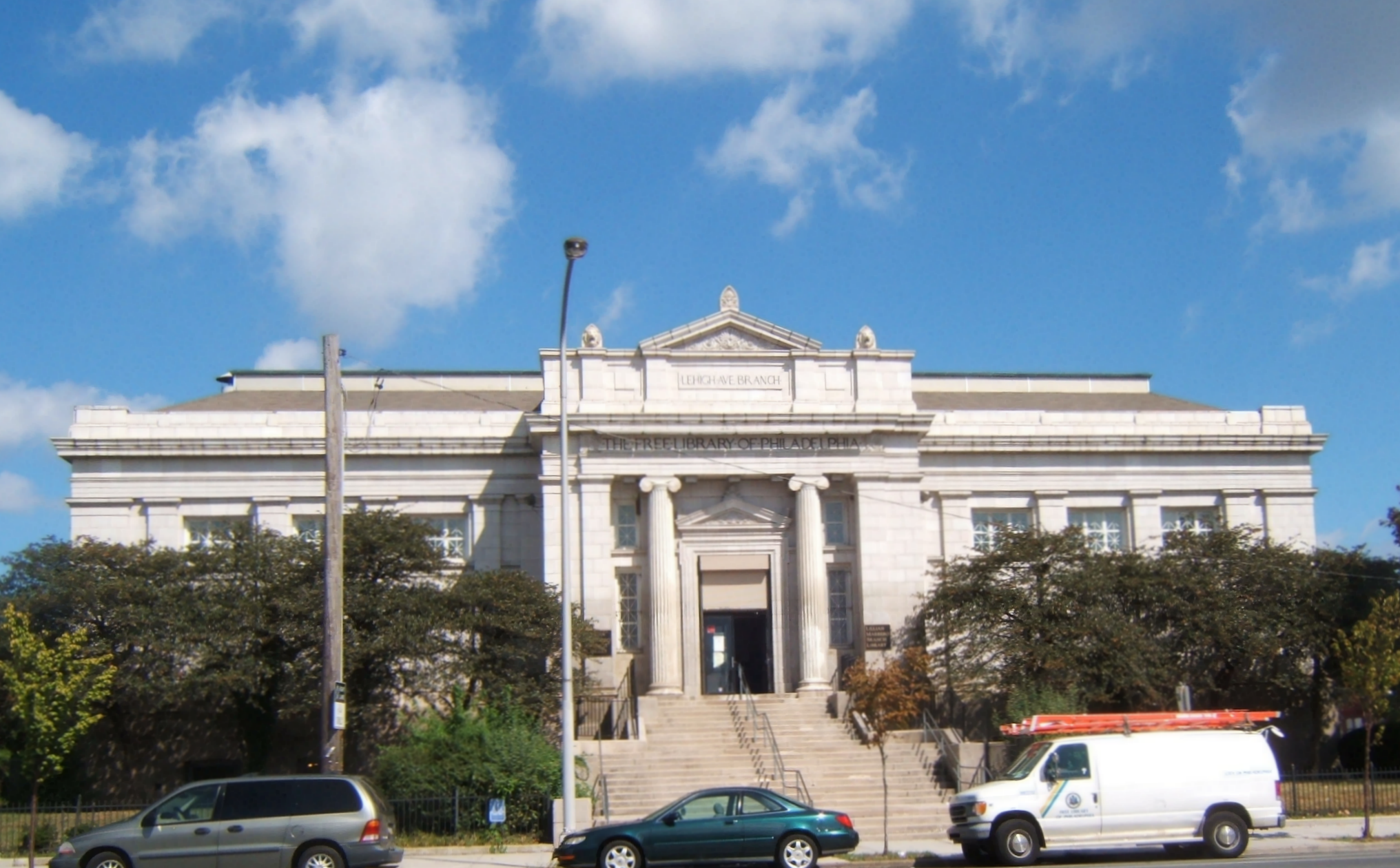
Lillian Marrero Branch of the Philadelphia Free Library in West Kensington

The area is bounded by York Street to the south, Front Street to the east, Lincoln Highway/Roosevelt Expressway to the north, and Ridge Avenue/Fairmount Park to the west. Upper North Philadelphia, is a section of Philadelphia that is immediately north of Lower North Philadelphia and can be described as an area that has a "...large and rapidly growing Puerto Rican population". The list of communities in this section is as follows:

- Allegheny West
- Fairhill
- Franklinville
- Glenwood
- Hunting Park
- Nicetown–Tioga

== Roxborough-Manayunk ==
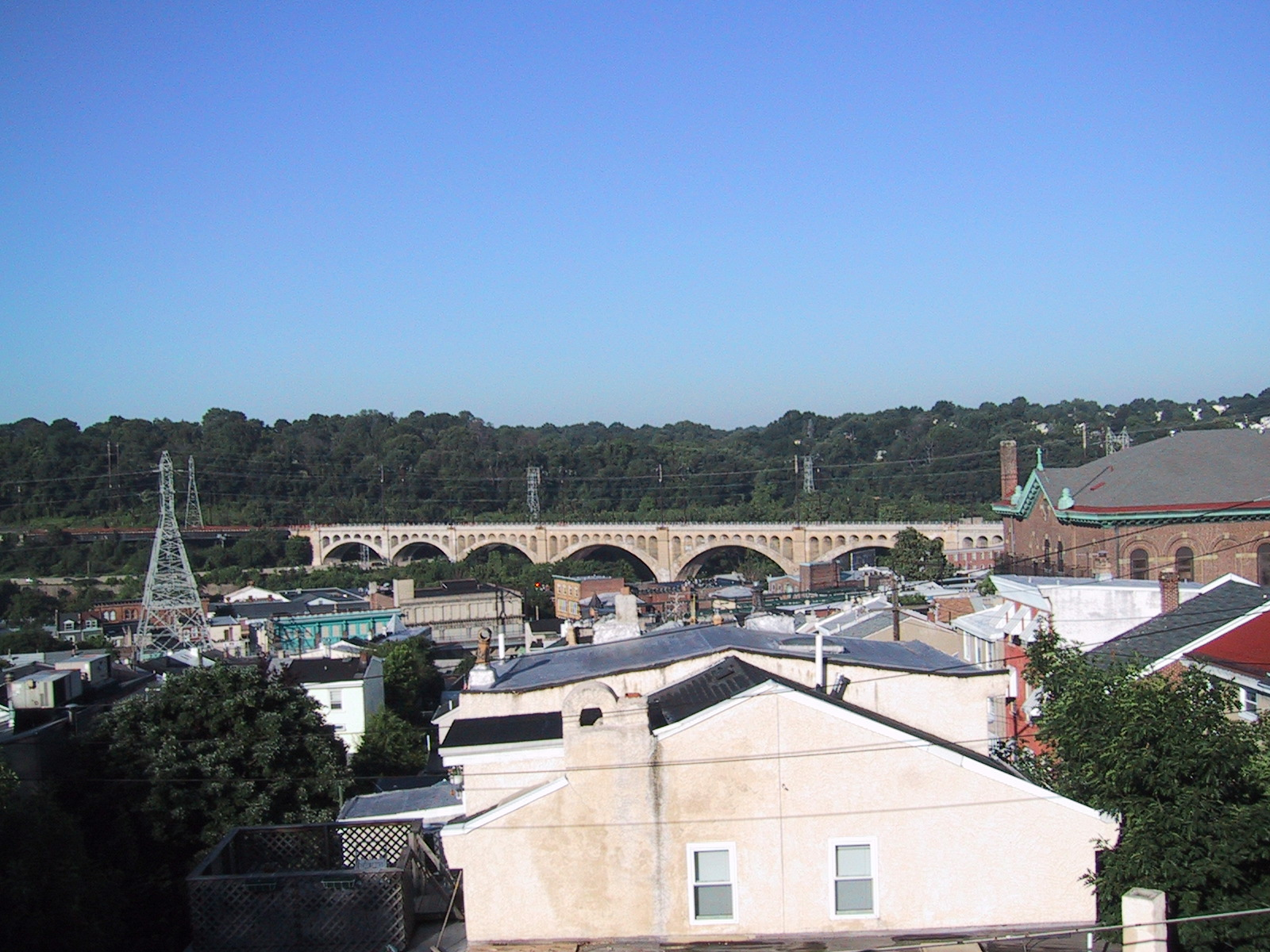
Manayunk skyline

The Roxborough-Manyunk section of Philadelphia is an official planning district of the Philadelphia City Planning Commission, consisting of the namesake boroughs of Roxborough and Manayunk. Geographically, the area is northwest of Center City.

- Andorra
- East Falls
- Wissahickon
- Roxborough
- Manayunk

== Germantown-Chestnut Hill ==
The Germantown-Chestnut Hill section of Philadelphia, also referred to "Uptown" is about 7–8 miles northwest from the center of the city. The neighborhood of Germantown is rich in historic sites and buildings from the colonial era, a few of which are open to the public. Its namesake also comes from the village of Chestnut Hill, which was part of the German Township laid out by Francis Daniel Pastorius and came to include the settlements originally known as Sommerhausen and Crefeld, as well as part of Cresheim. The area generally served as a gateway between Philadelphia and the nearby farmlands. During the American Revolutionary War era (late 18th century), the area was one of many summer vacation spots due to its higher elevation, 400–500 feet (120 to 150 m) above sea level, and cooler temperatures than the historic Center City. Chestnut Hill is still stereotypically known as one of the more affluent sections of Philadelphia.

- Chestnut Hill
- Mount Airy
- Cedarbrook
- Germantown
- Morton
- Wister

== Olney-Oak Lane ==
The Olney-Oak Lane Planning Analysis Section is an official section of Philadelphia. It is a section of Philadelphia that is immediately north of Upper North Philadelphia and south of Cheltenham. It is an area that consists of the now defunct township that was called "Bristol Township, Philadelphia County, Pennsylvania". The section is often included as part of North Philadelphia by city government agencies, though locally it is often referred to as "Uptown", along with the Germantown-Chestnut Hill section.

The section includes neighborhoods in the center-north of the city:

- East Oak Lane
- Feltonville
- Fern Rock
- Koreatown
- Logan
- Melrose Park
- Ogontz
- Olney
- Rowlandville (extinct)
- West Oak Lane

== River Wards ==
The River Wards section of Philadelphia is located to the northeast of Center City, along the Delaware River.

Neighborhoods within the River Wards include:

- Bridesburg
- Fishtown
- Harrowgate
- Kensington
- Port Richmond
- Olde Richmond

== Near Northeast Philadelphia ==
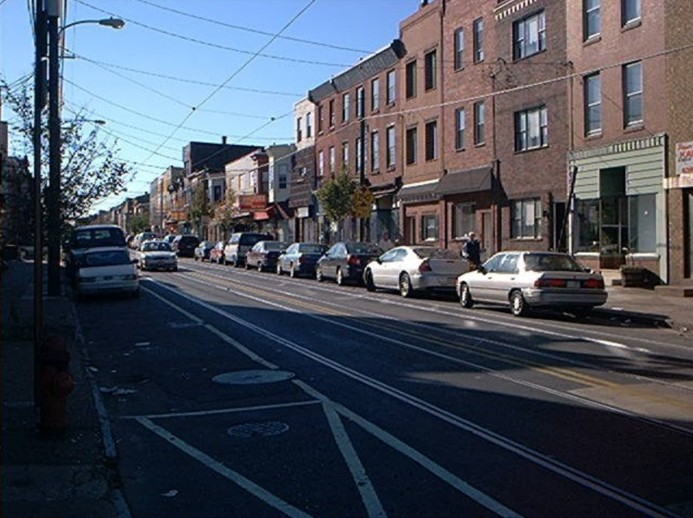
Richmond Street, one of the area's main thoroughfares in Port Richmond, 2005

Near Northeast Philadelphia, is a section of the city of Philadelphia. When combined with the Far Northeast, to be "Northeast Philadelphia", the 2000 Census shows that the combined area has a sizable percentage of the city's 1.547 million people — a population of between 300,000 and 450,000, depending on how the area is defined. Beginning in the 1980s, many of the Northeast's middle class children graduated from college and settled in suburbs, especially nearby Bucks County. An influx of Hispanics has occurred in the Northeast, while African Americans and Asian immigrants have purchased homes in Northeast Philadelphia. The Northeast is now both racially and ethnically diverse and has a large immigrant population.

- Burholme
- Castor Gardens
- Crescentville
- Fox Chase
- Frankford
- Holmesburg
- Juniata
- Lawncrest
- Lawndale
- Lexington Park
- Mayfair
- Northwood
- Oxford Circle
- Rhawnhurst
- Ryers
- Tacony
- Wissinoming

== Far Northeast Philadelphia ==
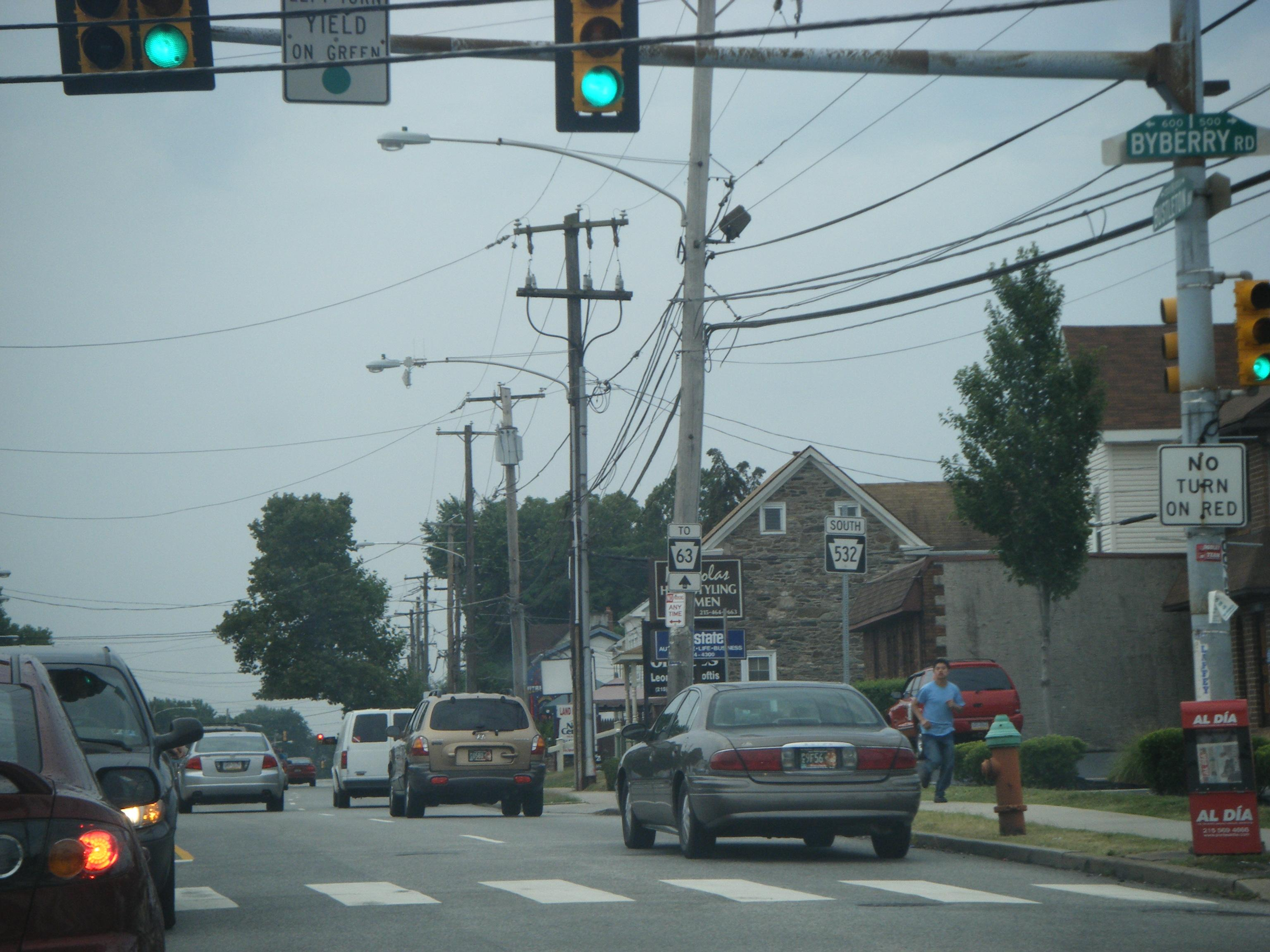
Bustleton and Byberry Streets in Somerton

Far Northeast Philadelphia is an official planning section of Philadelphia that is north of the Near Northeast section of Philadelphia.

- Academy Gardens
- Ashton-Woodenbridge
- Bustleton
- Byberry
- Crestmont Farms
- Krewstown
- Millbrook
- Modena Park
- Morrell Park
- Normandy
- Parkwood
- Pennypack
- Somerton
- Torresdale
- Upper Holmesburg
- Winchester Park
