= Northeast Times =

Newspaper in Philadelphia, Pennsylvania

- Type: Weekly newspaper
- Owner: Newspaper Media Group
- Language: English
- Headquarters: Bensalem Township, Pennsylvania, U.S.
- Website: www.northeasttimes.com

The Northeast Times is an American newspaper, in Philadelphia, Pennsylvania, that primarily targets the Northeast Philadelphia community. Philadelphia Newspapers, parent of The Philadelphia Inquirer, bought the Northeast Times in 1999. In 2010, Philadelphia Media Network sold the Times to a newly formed company, Broad Street Media, backed by Darwin Oordt and Clifford and Stuart Richner. Broad Street Media was acquired by Richard Donnelly in 2016, who formed Newspaper Media Group.
