= Saunders Park, Philadelphia =

Neighborhood in Philadelphia, Pennsylvania, United States

Saunders Park
- Neighborhood of Philadelphia
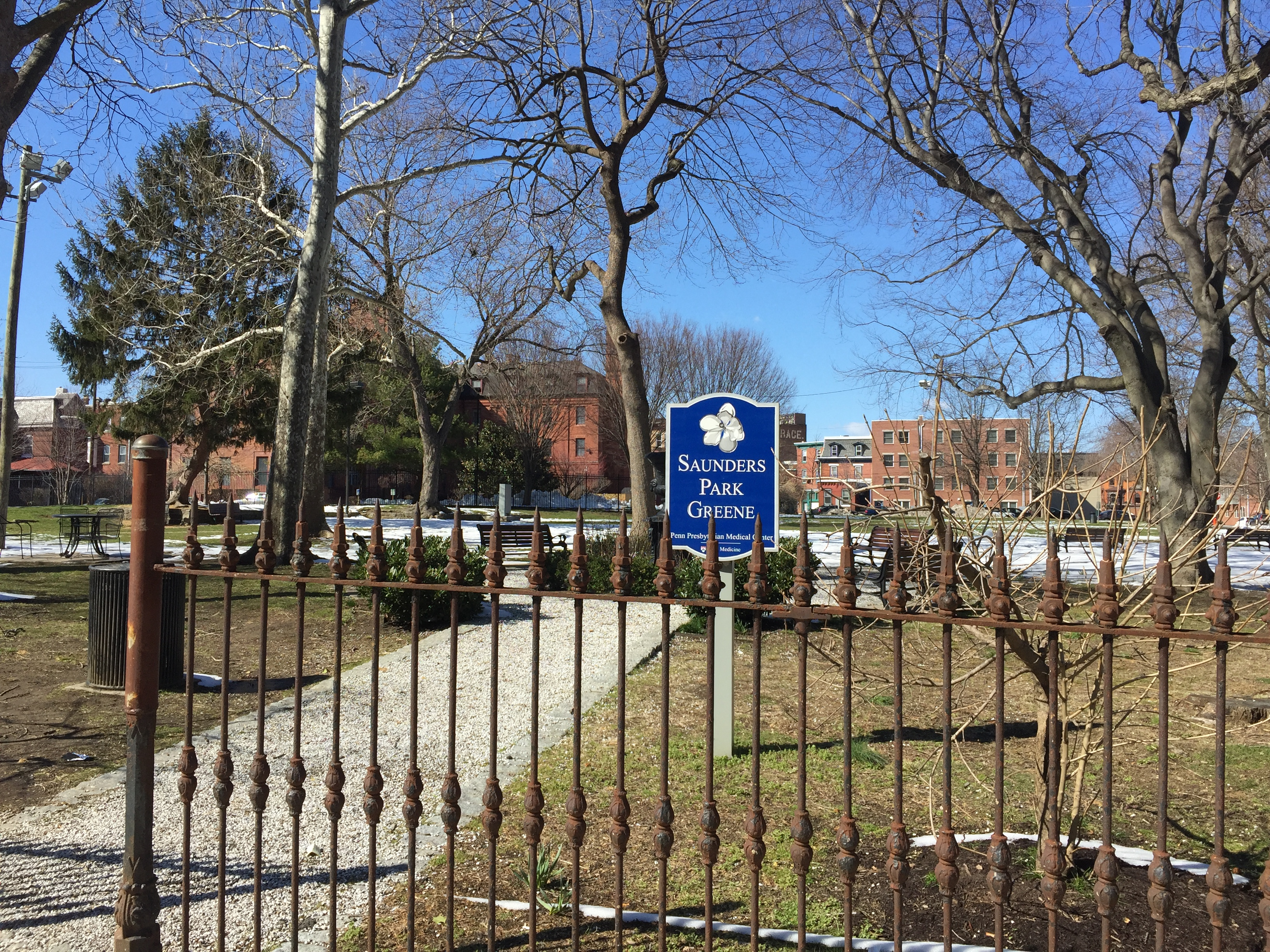
- Saunders Park Green near Powelton Village

- Location within Philadelphia
- Country: United States
- State: Pennsylvania
- County: Philadelphia
- City: Philadelphia
- Area codes: 215, 267 and 445

Saunders Park is a neighborhood in the West Philadelphia section of Philadelphia, Pennsylvania, United States. It is bounded by Powelton Avenue, 38th Street, Lancaster Avenue, and 40th Street. It is west of Powelton Village and north of Spruce Hill.

It is named for the park at the northeastern corner of 39th and Powelton Avenue. The Penn Presbyterian Medical Center is adjacent to the park.

Saunders Park is often considered to be a part of West Powelton, which extends out to 42nd Street.

The neighborhood has participated in planning for its future with the Delaware Valley Regional Planning Commission. The report of that plan is available here.
