= Academy Gardens, Philadelphia =

Academy Gardens
- Neighborhood of Philadelphia
- Location within Philadelphia
- Country: United States
- State: Pennsylvania
- County: Philadelphia County
- City: Philadelphia
- Area codes: 215, 267, and 445

Academy Gardens is a neighborhood located in Far Northeast Philadelphia, Pennsylvania, United States. It is located on the eastern side of the Far Northeast. Its approximate boundaries are Pennypack Park, Grant Avenue, the John F. Byrne Golf Course, and Holme Avenue. Originally farmland, it was part of the holdings of Thomas Holme, surveyor for Pennsylvania's founder, William Penn. The zip code is 19114.

Academy Gardens was settled by veterans of World War II during the vast economic development of the Northeast U.S. Many of the homes were inexpensive starter homes that were largely unfinished to cost constraints. These homes have been extensively remodeled over the years and now largely belie their humble origins.

Penn Academy and Crispin Gardens are the local youth sports organizations. There is little industry but a fair amount of retail trade in the neighborhood, mainly along Willits Road and Holme Avenue. Former prominent residents include Thomas Holme and Lord William J. McBride Jr.
