= Krewstown, Philadelphia =

Coordinates: 40.08562°N 75.04670°W

Krewstown is a neighborhood of Northeast Philadelphia close to both eastern Montgomery County, Pennsylvania and southern Bucks County, Pennsylvania located around Krewstown Road, west of the Roosevelt Boulevard. Uses of the name Krewstown include a bridge, a train station, a set of public horse stables, an apartment house complex (Krewstown Park), and the neighborhood around the apartment house complex.

The Krewstown area includes a number of Northeast Philadelphia's newer housing. In an overwhelmingly Democratic City where the Democratic mayoral nominee received 58% of the vote in the 2007 election for mayor, the Krewstown area has remained the same with considerable Democratic strength.

The Krewstown area is host to annual concerts in Pennypack Park.
