= Parkwood, Philadelphia =

Parkwood
- Neighborhood of Philadelphia
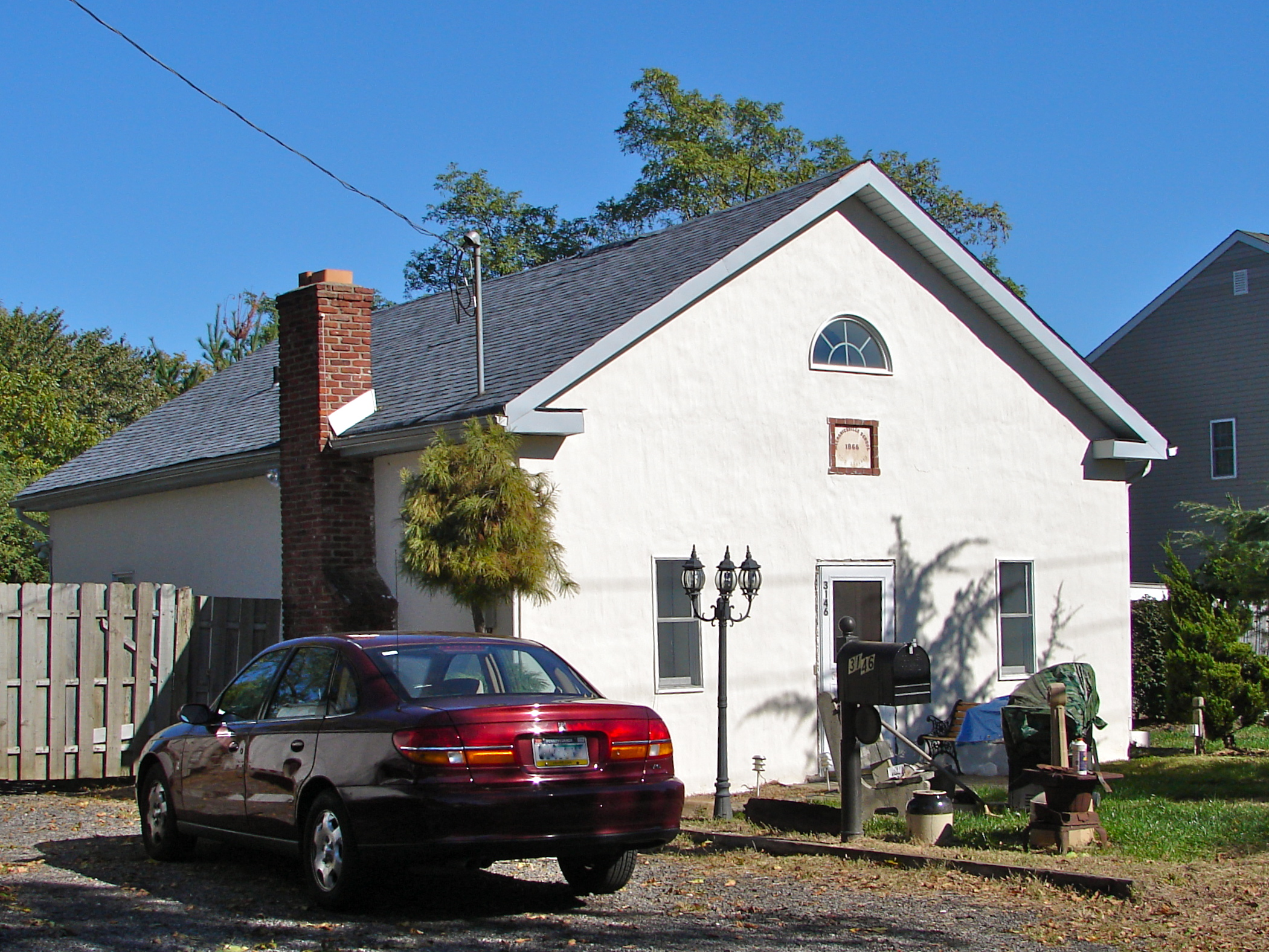
- Mechanicsville School in Parkwood, October 2010

- Location within Philadelphia
- Country: United States
- State: Pennsylvania
- County: Philadelphia County
- City: Philadelphia
- Area codes: 215, 267 and 445

Parkwood is a neighborhood located in the Far Northeast section of Philadelphia, Pennsylvania, United States. The neighborhood's boundaries include the Byberry East Industrial Park to the north and northwest, Poquessing Creek to the east, Knights Road to the southeast and Woodhaven Road to the southwest. The neighborhood was developed by Hyman Korman in the 1960-1962 as a planned residential community. The predominant housing type is the brick row house. The Parkwood Shopping Center is a local shopping destination, while the Philadelphia Mills mall is a regional shopping destination on Knights Road to the east of Parkwood's residential area.

== History ==
Before the first permanent European settlement of the area in the 17th century, Native American inhabited the area, including the Algonquian and Iroquois nations The dominant Algonquian group, the Lenni-Lenape, settled in this area because of the proximity to the Poquessing Creek, where fishing, hunting, and water resources were readily accessible. Despite their dependence on water, the Lenape created well established paths to major features in the region. Early explorers and European settlers, who arrived in the 17th century, utilized these paths, which became wagon trails and major highways such as Knights Road, Bristol Pike and Roosevelt Boulevard.

In 1645, Swedish settlers moved into the area and were soon followed by the English Quakers. Unofficial sources report the area was named "Byberry" after one of the first settler's hometown of Bibury, England. Others argue that William Penn and Henry A. Snyder suggested the name. In any case, the spelling varied for some time until the area officially became known as Byberry Township, PA in 1694. Just before the township was formally established, the Quakers built a Friends meeting house (1692) at the Southampton and Townsend Roads. By 1710 the Quaker Friends' School was built.

As the small village of Byberry began to grow, the first "Free School" opened in 1802. These buildings were reconstructed in the 19th century and remain today. Byberry Hall (1846) built by Robert Purvis, a free man of color, served as a meeting place for abolitionists. Lucretia Mott spoke here. Because this area was mostly farmland, these buildings created the "town center" of this community.

Just on the other side of the Poquessing Creek, Red Lion Inn, located along the historically important road Bristol Pike, opened in 1730. It was here that George Washington and the Massachusetts delegation reportedly stopped before attending the Continental Congress in Philadelphia. The Poquessing Creek area was developed with several mills in the late 18th and 19th centuries. Though none of the structures of the Knight's Mill, (1750), Townsend Mill, (1767) and the Carter Mill (1838) remain standing, there are intact stone arch bridges representing the historic period along the Poquessing Creek.

By the late 18th century, as the Byberry Township village grew the Lenni-Lenape moved out from this area. The Native American culture was acutely observed and recorded by two of Philadelphia's most significant forefathers, Henry Armstead Snyder and Dr. Benjamin Rush. They settled in Byberry Township in closer proximity to the mouth of the Poquessing Creek at Keswick and Rayland Roads. Benjamin Rush recorded the medicinal treatments the Indians used His historic contributions and credentials, too long to list in full, included being appointed to the Continental Congress and signing the Declaration of Independence, and being appointed physician-general in charge of hospital patients in George Washington's Army. Known as "The Father of American Psychiatry", Dr. Rush's medical accomplishments included training Meriweather Lewis as a medic on the Lewis and Clark Expedition, and treating many patients during the Yellow Fever Epidemic in Philadelphia. Today there is a memorial marker to Dr. Rush at the site of the family home.

By 1854, the City of Philadelphia annexed Byberry Township and in the late 19th century, Byberry Hospital was built. The hospital became the Philadelphia State Hospital at Byberry in 1906. When the hospital finally closed in the 1990s, its site to the east of Roosevelt Boulevard was divided into two major sections for use as an industrial park and the Benjamin Rush State Park.

During the late 1950s the majority of the housing was built by the Korman Corporation as a planned community to be called Parkwood Manor A neighborhood commercial center was added in the 1960s at Byberry and Academy Roads, and it is still owned by Korman. During the late 1970s and early 1980s, the City of Philadelphia established Byberry Industrial Park and approved development of the Franklin Mills Mall (now Philadelphia Mills Mall) on the former Liberty Bell Park (race track). Soon after, the Community College of Philadelphia opened its Northeast location in the Parkwood area.

The Mechanicsville School was listed on the National Register of Historic Places in 1986.

== Population ==
The population in Parkwood was 14,778 in the 2000 Census; however, in the 2020 census the neighborhood rose in population to 17,386. Between the 1980 Census and the 2000 Census, the neighborhood experienced a 22% population decrease due in part to smaller household size and an increase in single person households. Parkwood experienced a 4% increase in persons over age 65 between 1990 and 2000. Census statistics indicate that Parkwood, like Philadelphia as a whole, is becoming more racially diverse. The racial composition was 76% White, 12% African American, 7% Hispanic, 4% Asian, and 1% Two or more races in the 2020 census.

Demographics (2022)	Parkwood	City
White	76%	44.8%
Under 18	24%	22%
65 years +	14%	14%
Population in poverty	11%	19.4%
Median family income	$65,449	$49,127
High School graduate	89%	85%
Bachelor's degree/higher ed	22%	31.2%
Unemployment rate	05%	11%
Cars per household	1.7	0.9
Occupied housing units	97%	89%
Owner occupied housing	74%	53%

== Land Use ==
Parkwood's land use achieves a balanced mix of residential, recreational, institutional, commercial and industrial land use. To the east of Roosevelt Boulevard, industrial and

business uses occupy approximately 112 acres (0.45 km^{2}) within Byberry Industrial Park. Just north of Byberry Industrial Park, approximately 280 acres (1.1 km^{2}) of land zoned recreational for Benjamin Rush State Park. Large tracts of open space border the creek, with tributaries meandering into the neighborhood creating grass lined drainage swales that weave through residential developments. The neighborhood commercial center is located at the intersection of Academy and Byberry Road, to the west of Knights Road. Philadelphia Mills Mall, a regional commercial attraction, sits alongside the Poquessing Creek near Interstate 95.

=== Residential ===
Parkwood is predominantly residential and its housing is stable and attractive. Housing densities range from apartments, condominiums, and row homes to single family detached. For the most part, Parkwood's housing remains well maintained, though some homes in Parkwood could use cosmetic maintenance or some basic repairs. Vacant housing is virtually non-existent. The 2000 Census reports a 3% vacancy rate, that reflects short-term market vacancies. Home ownership, a major strength of the neighborhood, has remained steady with a rate of 80%, which is much higher than the city as a whole. The median residential property value was in excess of $155,000 (2004 data) and an analysis of sales in 2009-2010 indicates that homes were selling in the range of $160,000 to $210,000.

=== Commercial ===
The Philadelphia Mills Mall, a regional shopping center with over 2,500,000 square feet (230,000 m^{2}) of rentable floor space developed in the 1980s, is located on the eastern side of the neighborhood. There are numerous chain restaurants, a sporting goods store, and grocery stores, among other "mega-stores" within this expansive retail outlet mall. Almost unlimited shopping opportunities are available. According to the Philadelphia Planning Commissions PhilaShops study, the mall's stage of development is currently stable.

Parkwood benefits from the convenience of having its own neighborhood shopping center at Academy and Byberry Roads. However, according to the PhilaShops data, this commercial center, built in the 1960s, experienced an increase in vacancy by almost 17 percent over the eight-year time span prior to 2003. Several years ago, this shopping center underwent façade improvements to create a more uniform appearance. More extensive improvements have also been constructed at the Parkwood Shopping Center, including the addition of a new anchor store.

=== Industrial ===
Another asset for the Parkwood community is Byberry Industrial Park, where more than 50 employers are located. The businesses here employ about 5,000 people in the region. In fact, Byberry East Industrial Park is home to some of Philadelphia's largest employers including Elliot-Lewis Corporation, Antonio Origlio Inc., Almo Corporation and Ricoh Business Systems. These companies have utilized economic development stimulus programs because the area is designated as a Keystone Opportunity Zone. The park is also home to the Delaware Valley Veteran's Nursing Home and the Northeast campus of the Community College of Philadelphia. The manager of the industrial park, the Philadelphia Industrial Development Corporation (PIDC), recently conveyed buffer area rights-of-way to the ownership of the Fairmount Park Commission. The buffers are part of a planned business campus that uses deed restrictions to control setbacks and landscaped areas.

=== Open space, parks and recreation ===
Parkwood offers a wide array of open space opportunities. Small creek areas and swales transverse the neighborhood and create connections for people who walk their dogs and exercise.

=== Community facilities ===
Parkwood's community facilities provide space for different organizations and groups to meet. These facilities are important because they help strengthen community ties. Decatur Elementary School and Shallcross School occupy a 75-acre (300,000 m^{2}) tract in the southeastern section of the neighborhood. The Shallcross facility is a former remedial and disciplinary school that is now being considered for other uses. Junod Playground, sometimes referred to as a Recreation Center, contains a building for indoor activities. St. Anselm Church is one of the major places of worship in Parkwood. The nearest public library, the Katherine Drexel Branch Library, is located south of the neighborhood across Woodhaven Road.

== Notable people ==
- Martina White, state representative
