= Pennypack Park =

Municipal park in Philadelphia

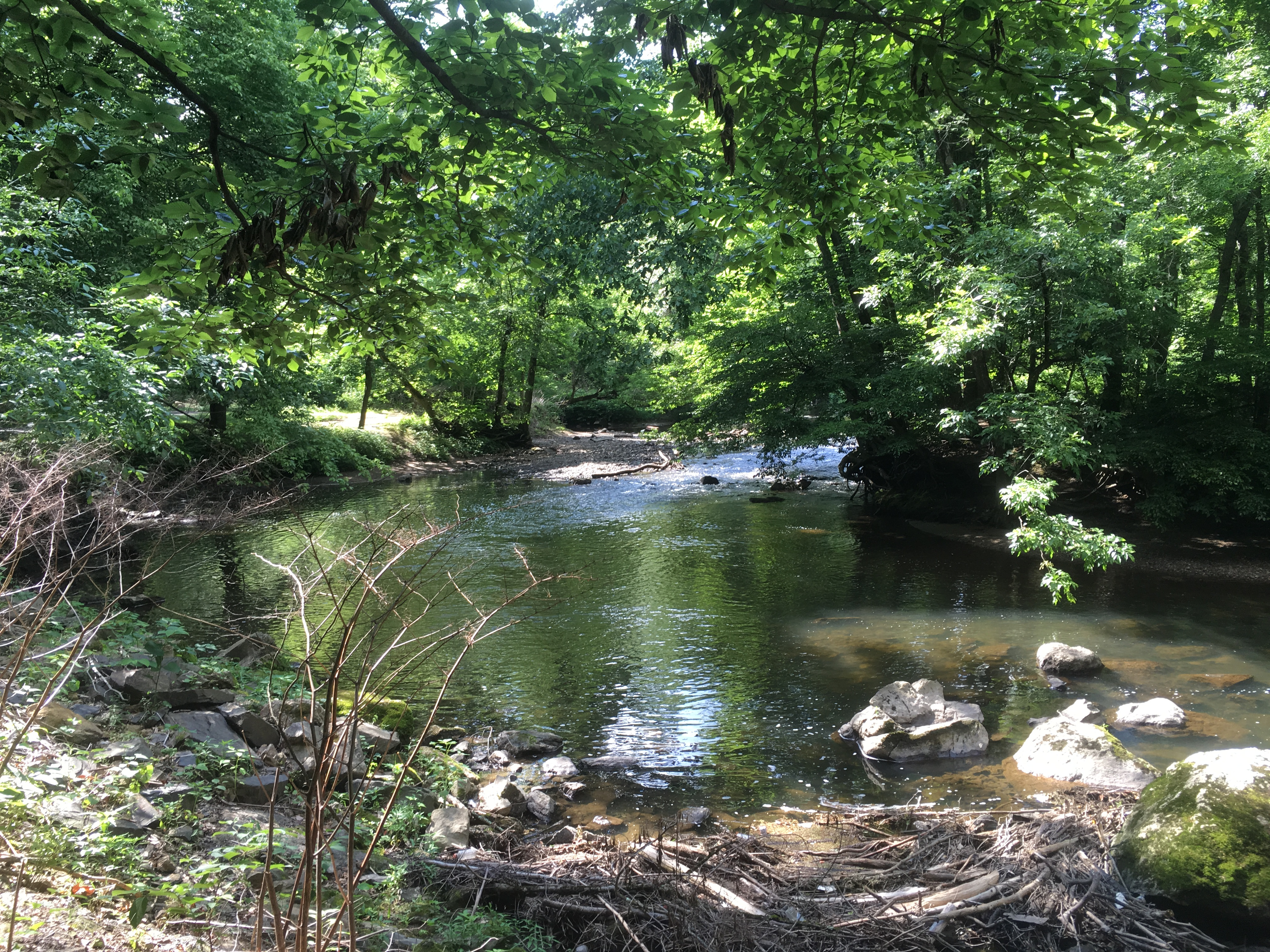
- Interactive map of Pennypack Park
- Type: Urban park
- Location: Philadelphia, Pennsylvania, U.S.
- Coordinates: 40°03′26″N 75°02′12″W
- Area: 1,600 acres (6.5 km^{2})
- Created: 1905
- Owner: Philadelphia Parks & Recreation
- Operator: Friends of Pennypack Park
- Website: www.friendsofpennypackpark.org

Pennypack Park is a municipal park, part of the Philadelphia Parks & Recreation system located in Northeast Philadelphia in the U.S. state of Pennsylvania. Established in 1905 by ordinance of the City of Philadelphia, it includes about 1,600 acres (6 km^{2}) of woodlands, meadows and wetlands. The Pennypack Creek runs through the park from Pine Road to the Delaware River. The park has playgrounds, hiking and bike trails, and bridle paths for horseback riding. An adjunct to the park is the Pennypack Environmental Center on Verree Road.

More than 150 species of nesting and migrating birds use the park, including the tiny ruby-throated hummingbird, the great blue heron, warblers, the pileated woodpecker, several kinds of seabirds, ducks, geese, hawks, great horned owls and the little screech owl to name only a few. Famous for its large, scattered deer herd, the park is home to a large variety of mammals, including several kinds of bat, the red and gray fox, rabbits, chipmunks, mice, muskrats, groundhogs, raccoons, skunks, opossum and weasels. The park is home to many reptile species including several kinds of snakes, turtles (including common snapping turtles), frogs, the common toad and several kinds of salamanders.

Many historic structures remain intact throughout Pennypack Park. Built in 1697, the King's Highway Bridge at Frankford Avenue is the oldest stone bridge still in use in the United States. Pennepack Baptist Church, another of the park's historic sites, was chartered in 1688. During the American Revolutionary War The Verree House on Verree Road was the site of a raid by British troops. Pennypack also contains some more modern landmarks, including the Ed Kelly Amphitheater.

== See also ==
- Greenbelt Knoll
- List of parks in Philadelphia
