= List of museums in Philadelphia =

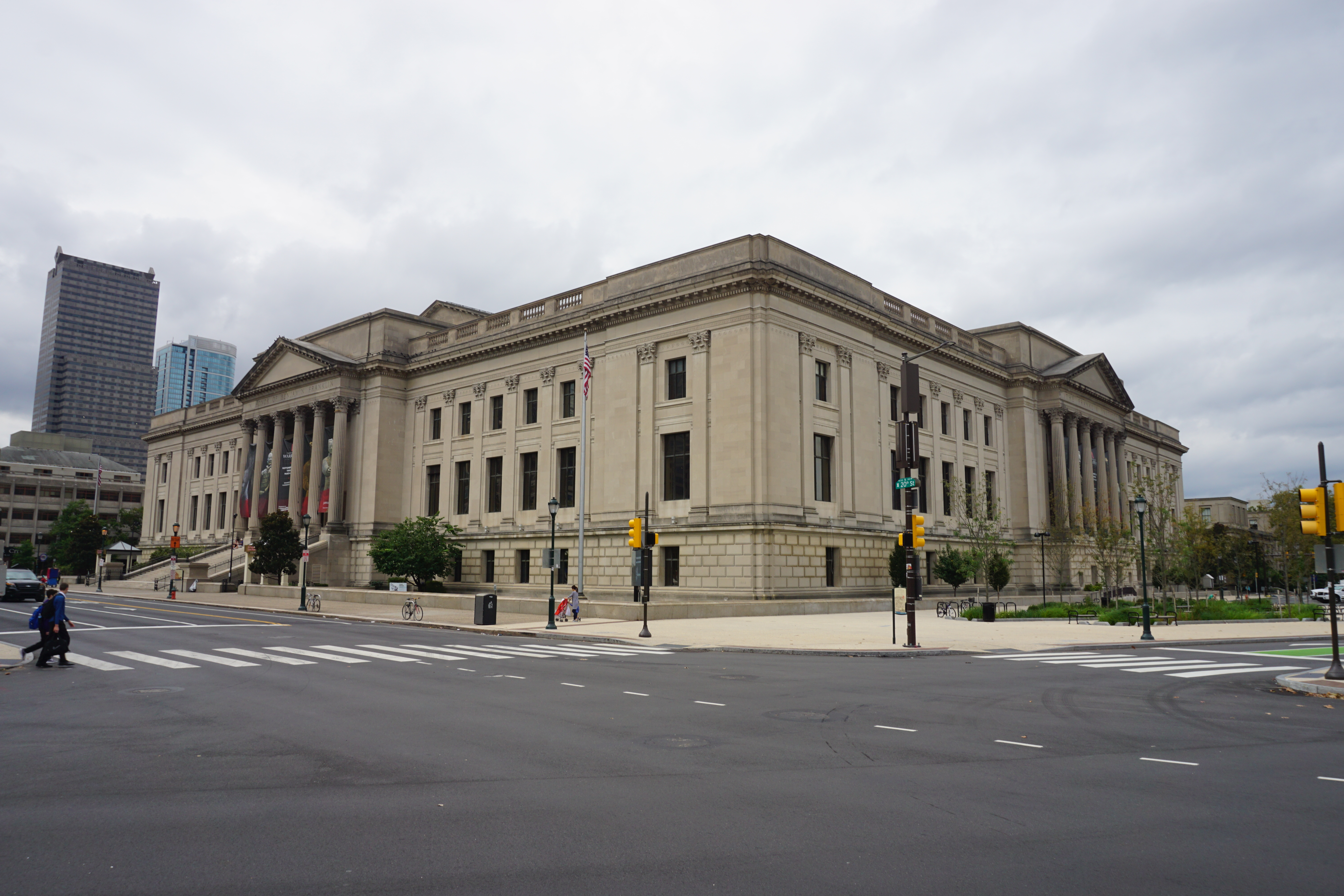
The Franklin Institute in Philadelphia

This list of museums in Philadelphia, Pennsylvania, encompasses museums defined for this context as institutions, including nonprofit organizations, government entities, and private businesses, that collect and care for objects of cultural, artistic, scientific, or historical interest and make their collections or related exhibits available for public viewing. Also included are university and non-profit art galleries. Museums that exist only in cyberspace, such as virtual museums, are not included.

== Current museums ==
Name	Neighborhood	Type	Summary
Academy of Natural Sciences of Drexel University	Center City	Natural history	Nature dioramas, large mineral crystals, dinosaurs, live animals
ACES Museum	Germantown	Military	Honors the black and minority veterans of World War II
African American Museum in Philadelphia	Center City	Ethnic	Formerly known as Afro-American Historical and Cultural Museum
American Philosophical Society Museum	Center City	Multiple	Changing exhibits on history, science and art drawn from its collections
American Swedish Historical Museum	South Philadelphia	Ethnic - Swedish American	Focuses on Swedish contributions to history, art, architecture, music, science and technology
Arthur Ross Gallery	West Philadelphia	Art	Art Gallery of the University of Pennsylvania. Located on the first floor of the Fisher Fine Arts Library.
Athenaeum of Philadelphia	Center City	Art	Museum of American fine and decorative arts, exhibits about architecture and design history
Barnes Foundation	Center City	Art	Post-Impressionist and early Modern paintings, American masters, Old Master paintings, African sculpture, Native American ceramics, jewelry and textiles, American paintings and decorative arts and antiquities from the Mediterranean region and Asia
Bartram's Garden	Southwest Philadelphia	Historic house	Botanical garden with a historic house to tour
Belmont Mansion	West Philadelphia	History	Historic mansion with Underground Railroad museum in Fairmount Park
Betsy Ross House	Center City	Historic house	Possible home of Betsy Ross, who sewed flags for the U.S. Navy and may have sewn the first American flag.
Bishop White House	Center City	Historic house	Part of Independence National Historical Park, late-18th-century-period house
Carpenters' Hall	Center City	History	Part of Independence National Historical Park, colonial history of the carpenter's guild
Cedar Grove Mansion	West Philadelphia	Historic house	18th-century stone house reflection five generations of owners
Center for Art in Wood	Center City	Art	International arts institution, gallery and resource center for design of art in wood
Civil War Museum of Philadelphia	Philadelphia	Civil War	Temporarily closed 2008, seeking new location; collection stored at the Gettysburg Museum and Visitor Center, National Museum of American Jewish History and the African American Museum in Philadelphia
Cliveden	Germantown	Historic house	Operated by the National Trust for Historic Preservation. A mid-18th-century mansion that was the scene of some of the bloodiest fighting of the 1777 Battle of Germantown during the American Revolutionary War. Now a house museum.
Colored Girls Museum	Germantown	Ethnic - African American	A "memoir museum" devoted to the stories, experiences, and history of ordinary Black women and girls
Concord School House	Germantown	Education	18th-century one-room schoolhouse
Congress Hall	Center City	History	Part of Independence National Historical Park, restored to period when the building served as the meeting place of the U. S. Congress from 1790 - 1800
Declaration House	Center City	Historic house	website, part of Independence National Historical Park, 18th-century house where Thomas Jefferson drafted the Declaration of Independence
Dolley Todd House	Center City	Historic house	Part of Independence National Historical Park, 18th-century-period home of Dolley Todd Madison
Drexel University Collection	West Philadelphia	Art	website, painting, sculpture, decorative arts and porcelain, exhibited in the AJ Drexel Picture Gallery, Rincliff Gallery, Peck Gallery
Eastern State Penitentiary	Lower North Philadelphia	Prison	Tours and exhibits about the 19th century prison that was in use until 1971
Ebenezer Maxwell Mansion	Germantown	Historic house	Victorian mansion and garden
Edgar Allan Poe National Historic Site	Lower North Philadelphia	Historic house	Home once rented by author Edgar Allan Poe, exhibits about his life and works
Elfreth's Alley Museum	Center City	Historic house	Only house on Elfreth's Alley that is accessible to the public
The Fabric Workshop and Museum	Center City	Art	Devoted to creating new work in new materials and new media
Fairmount Water Works	Lower North Philadelphia	Natural history	Interpretive center houses interactive exhibits about water and the water works
Firemen's Hall Museum	Center City	Firefighting	website, history and heroic moments of Philadelphia firefighting
Fort Mifflin	Southwest Philadelphia	Military	Centerpiece of the British conquest of Philadelphia during the American Revolution, 18th- and 19th-century buildings
Founder's Hall	Lower North Philadelphia	Decorative arts	Part of Girard College, collection of furniture, silver, paintings, ceramics, textiles and archives of Stephen Girard, and school memorabilia
Franklin Court	Center City	History	Part of Independence National Historical Park, site of Ben Franklin's house, features Benjamin Franklin Museum, an 18th-century printing office, an architectural/archeological exhibit, an operating post office and a postal museum
Franklin Institute	Center City	Science	Many hands-on exhibits, also Ben Franklin's inventions
Galleries at Moore College	Center City	Art	Part of Moore College of Art and Design
Germantown Historical Society Museum	Germantown	Local history	website, furniture, decorative and historical exhibits, located in the John Fromberger House
Germantown White House	Germantown	Historic house	Owned by the National Park Service, formerly the Deshler-Morris House, 18th-century house that sheltered George Washington and his family
Glen Foerd on the Delaware	Northeast Philadelphia	Historic site	Philadelphia's only remaining Delaware riverfront estate open to the public, listed on the National Register of Historic Places and the Historic American Landscape Survey
Grand Army of the Republic Civil War Museum and Library	Northeast Philadelphia	Military	Located in the John Ruan House, features Civil War and Grand Army of the Republic artifacts, books, and memorabilia
Grumblethorpe	Germantown	Historic house	Mid-18th-century house
Hill-Keith-Physick House	Center City	Historic house	Operated by the Philadelphia Society for the Preservation of Landmarks, 19th-century home of surgical pioneer Dr. Philip Syng Physick
Historical Society of Frankford	Northeast Philadelphia	Local history	History of Northeast Philadelphia
Historical Society of Pennsylvania	Center City	History	Changing exhibits of the history of Pennsylvania and the founding of the United States
Independence Hall	Center City	History	Part of Independence National Historical Park, location where both the Declaration of Independence and the United States Constitution were debated and adopted
Independence National Historical Park	Center City	History	Includes Independence Hall, the Liberty Bell, Carpenters' Hall, Visitor Center and National Constitution Center
Independence Seaport Museum	Center City	Maritime	Maritime artifacts, ship models, permanent and interactive exhibits, including the warship USS Olympia (C-6) and the submarine USS Becuna (SS-319)
Institute of Contemporary Art, Philadelphia	West Philadelphia	Art	Part of the University of Pennsylvania
John Johnson House	Germantown	Historic house	Significant for its role in the antislavery movement and the Underground Railroad
La Salle University Art Museum	Germantown	Art	Collections include European and American art from the Renaissance to the present
Laurel Hill Mansion	North Philadelphia	Historic house	website, 18th-century Georgian house
Lemon Hill Mansion	Lower North Philadelphia	Historic house	Located in Fairmount Park, operated by the Pennsylvania chapter of the Colonial Dames of America and the Friends of Lemon Hill, early-19th-century house
Leonard Pearlstein Gallery	West Philadelphia	Art	website, part of Drexel University's Antoinette Westphal College of Media Arts and Design, exhibits novel and experimental art in all contemporary mediums including digital, video, sculpture, photography, graphics, and fashion design
Liberty Bell Center	Center City	History	Part of Independence National Historical Park, includes the Liberty Bell and exhibits about its history and role as an international icon of freedom
Library Company of Philadelphia	Center City	Library	Changing exhibits from its collections of American history and culture from the 17th through the 19th centuries
Living Loft Puppet Museum	West Philadelphia	Puppet	Creations of the Spiral Q Puppet Theater, open by appointment
Mario Lanza Museum	South Philadelphia	Biographical	website, memorabilia from the career of the legendary tenor Mario Lanza
Marian Anderson Museum and Birthplace	South Philadelphia	Biographical	Two sites operated by the Marion Anderson Historical Society
Masonic Library and Museum of Pennsylvania	Center City	Masonic	Center of Freemasonry in Pennsylvania
Mount Pleasant	Lower North Philadelphia	Historic house	Colonial era mansion
Mummers Museum	South Philadelphia	Art	website, costumes from the Mummers Parade
Museum of the American Revolution	Center City	History	History of the American Revolution
Mütter Museum	Center City	Medical	Collection of medical oddities, anatomical and pathological specimens, wax models, and antique medical equipment
National Constitution Center	Center City	History	History and relevance of the United States Constitution
National Liberty Museum	Center City	History	Eight galleries focus on heroism, freedom, diversity, faith and more; includes over 100 works in glass illustrating the beauty and fragility of freedom
National Shrine of Saint John Neumann	North Philadelphia	Religious	Shrine with museum about John Neumann
New Hall Military Museum	Center City	Military	website, part of Independence National Historical Park, exhibits about the founding of the United States Marine Corps and the Army and Navy Departments
Old City Hall	Center City	History	Part of Independence National Historical Park, site of the first U.S. Supreme Court
Painted Bride Art Center	Center City	Art	Non-profit artist-centered performance space and gallery particularly oriented to presenting the work of local Philadelphia artists
Paul Robeson House	West Philadelphia	African American	Legacy of Paul Robeson, community art exhibits
Pennsylvania Academy of the Fine Arts	Center City	Art	Oldest art museum and school in the nation, 19th- and 20th-century American paintings, sculptures, and works on paper
Philadelphia Doll Museum	Lower North Philadelphia	Toy	African, Europeans American Folk Art dolls, the renowned Roberta Bell Doll Collection, American and internationally manufactured dolls and more; emphasis on black dolls
Philadelphia History Museum	Center City	Local history	History museum for the City of Philadelphia (currently closed, future unknown)
Philadelphia Museum of Art	Lower North Philadelphia	Art	European, Asian and American fine art, furniture and decorative arts, arms & armor, period rooms
Philadelphia Museum of Jewish Art	Lower North Philadelphia	Art	Part of Congregation Rodeph Shalom, exhibits contemporary art that illuminates the Jewish experience
Philadelphia's Magic Gardens	South Philadelphia	Art	Mosaic-covered gardens, building and art gallery
Please Touch Museum	West Philadelphia	Children's	Interactive museum to promote learning in children
Polish American Cultural Center Museum	Center City	Ethnic - Polish	website
Powel House	Center City	Historic house	Operated by the Philadelphia Society for the Preservation of Landmarks, 18th-century Georgian townhouse mansion
The Print Center	Center City	Art	website, contemporary printmaking and photography
RittenhouseTown	Germantown	Historic village	18th and 19th century houses. Site of British North America's first paper mill and birthplace of David Rittenhouse
Rodin Museum	Center City	Art	Largest collection of sculptor Auguste Rodin's works outside Paris
Romanian Folk Art Museum	Center City	Ethnic - Romania	website, Romanian costumes, rugs, pottery, furniture and a full Transylvanian interior
Rosenbach Museum & Library	Center City	Art, Library	Rare miniature portraits, 18th- and 19th-century British and American furniture and decorative art, rare books, manuscripts and illustrations, collection of works by Maurice Sendak
Ryerss Museum and Library	Northeast Philadelphia	Historic house	Mansion with Asian and European decorative arts, located in Burholme Park
Samuel S. Fleisher Art Memorial	South Philadelphia	Art	Community art centre, contains art by Violet Oakley, tiles by Henry Chapman Mercer, 18th-century Portuguese art, primitive European art, religious art from the original church
Science History Institute (formerly the Chemical Heritage Foundation)	Center City	Science	History of science, particularly chemistry, and the role science plays in the modern world
Second Bank of the United States	Center City	Art	Part of Independence National Historical Park, art gallery exhibits of Colonial and Federal leaders, military officers, explorers and scientists, including many by Charles Willson Peale
Shofuso Japanese House and Garden	West Philadelphia	Historic house	Part of Fairmount Park, traditional 17th-century–style Japanese house and garden
Simeone Foundation Automotive Museum	Southwest Philadelphia	Automotive	Collection of over 65 historically significant racing sports cars
Stenton	North Philadelphia	Historic house	Early American Georgian architecture, operated by The National Society of the Colonial Dames of America
Strawberry Mansion	North Philadelphia	Historic house	late 18th-century house located in Fairmount Park
Tall Ship Gazela & Tug Jupiter	Center City	Maritime	1883 tall sailing ship Gazela, the 1902 iron tugboat Jupiter and lighter barge Poplar open for tours
Temple University School of Podiatric Medicine Shoe Museum	Lower North Philadelphia	Clothing	Open by appointment, part of Temple University School of Podiatric Medicine
Thaddeus Kosciuszko National Memorial	Center City	Historic house	Historic house where wounded Polish freedom fighter Thaddeus Kosciuszko lived
Tyler School of Art	Lower North Philadelphia	Art	Features Temple Contemporary gallery
University of Pennsylvania Museum of Archaeology and Anthropology	West Philadelphia	Archaeology, Anthropology	Artifacts from Egypt, China, Mesopotamia, Greco-Roman antiquities, Buddhist art, African art, and Mayan and other Pre-Columbian artifacts
Upsala	Germantown	Historic house	Late 18th century house
Wagner Free Institute of Science	Lower North Philadelphia	Natural history	Victorian cases and hand-labeled natural history specimens arranged in the 1880s
Weitzman National Museum of American Jewish History	Center City	Jewish	Story of Jews in America
Wells Fargo History Museum	Center City	History	Wells Fargo shuttered all of their museums in 2020 except one in San Francisco which closed in 2025.
Woodford	North Philadelphia	Historic house	Part of Fairmount Park, houses collection of antique household goods, including Colonial furniture, unusual clocks and English delftware
Woodmere Art Museum	Northwest Philadelphia	Art	Paintings, prints, sculpture and photographs focusing on artists from the Delaware Valley
Wyck House	Germantown	Historic house	Oldest house in Germantown

== Defunct museums ==
- Curtis Center Museum of Norman Rockwell Art, Philadelphia, closed in 1997
- Insectarium, opened in 1992 and closed in 2023.
- National Philatelic Museum, Philadelphia, opened in 1948, closed in 1959
- Neon Museum of Philadelphia, closed in 2022, 2 years after it opened.
- Peale's Philadelphia Museum opened in 1784, closed in 1849
- Philadelphia Art Alliance, closed in June 2024, following the bankruptcy and abrupt closure of its parent institution, the University of the Arts. A center for visual, literary and performing arts since 1915, its building on Rittenhouse Square was sold to the Curtis Institute of Music in January 2025.
- Philadelphia Commercial Museum, opened in 1899 and closed in 1994. Its building was demolished for an expansion of the Hospital of the University of Pennsylvania.
- Sweetbriar Mansion, closed since 2014. The late-18th-century house museum, located in west Fairmount Park, was operated by the Modern Club of Philadelphia from 1939 to 2014.

== See also ==
List of museums in Pennsylvania
List of tourist attractions in Philadelphia
