= Fox Chase, Philadelphia =

Neighborhood of Philadelphia, Pennsylvania

Fox Chase
- Neighborhood of Philadelphia
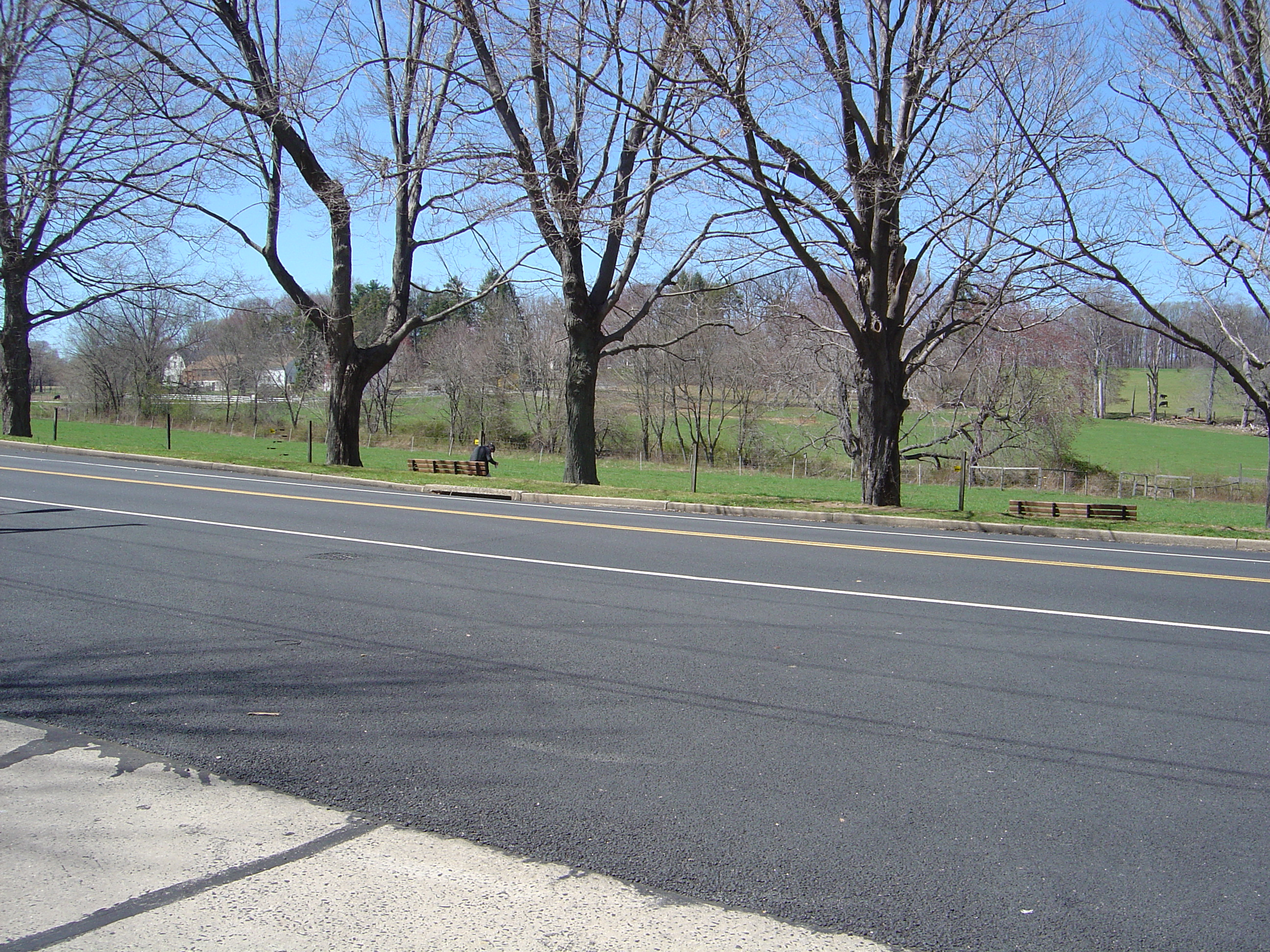
- Fox Chase Farm

- Location within Philadelphia
- Coordinates: 40.0731°N 75.0763°W
- Country: United States of America
- State: Pennsylvania
- County: Philadelphia
- Neighborhood: Philadelphia
- Incorporated: 1854

Area
  - Total: 2.83 sq mi (7.3 km^{2})

Population (2010)
  - Total: 20,069
  - Density: 7,090/sq mi (2,740/km^{2})
- Postal code: 19111
- Area codes: 215, 267, and 445

Fox Chase is a neighborhood in the Northeast section of Philadelphia, located approximately 10 mi (16 km) northeast of Center City. Although its borders are not officially defined, the neighborhood is generally bounded by Pennypack Park to the north, Algon Avenue to the east, Cottman Avenue to the south, and Fillmore Street to the west. Adjacent neighborhoods include Bustleton, Rhawnhurst, Burholme, and Rockledge (a borough in Montgomery County). Fox Chase uses the 19111 zip code.

== History ==
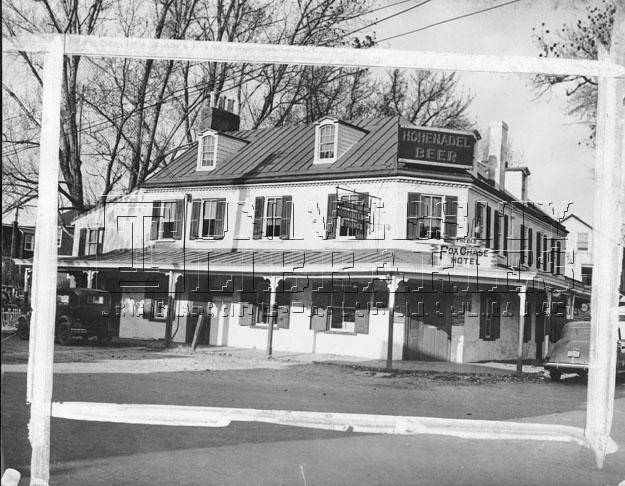
The exterior of the Old Fox Chase Hotel, long a familiar landmark at the bending intersection of Oxford Avenue and Pine Road, near Rhawn. The hotel, built in 1705, developed a thriving stagecoach business with the opening of the Fox Chase and Huntingdon Turnpike in 1848. Before 1870, it was owned by Elijah Hoffman, who operated it for many years. The hotel was sold and razed in 1940 to make way for a gasoline station.

Fox Chase was historically part of Lower Dublin Township, also known as Dublin Township, a defunct township located in Philadelphia County, Pennsylvania. The township ceased to exist and was incorporated into the City of Philadelphia following the passage of the Act of Consolidation, 1854.

Philadelphia's elite once flocked to opulent vacation homes built in the lush fringes bordering the city. The area's character changed with the arrival of the railroad in 1876. Many of Philadelphia's aristocracy began to discover the attractiveness of suburban living, and built mansions here, using the railroad for convenient transport into the city. The neighborhood was named after affluent colonists came to hunt in the region. A chase (land) is a specific area of land reserved for hunting.

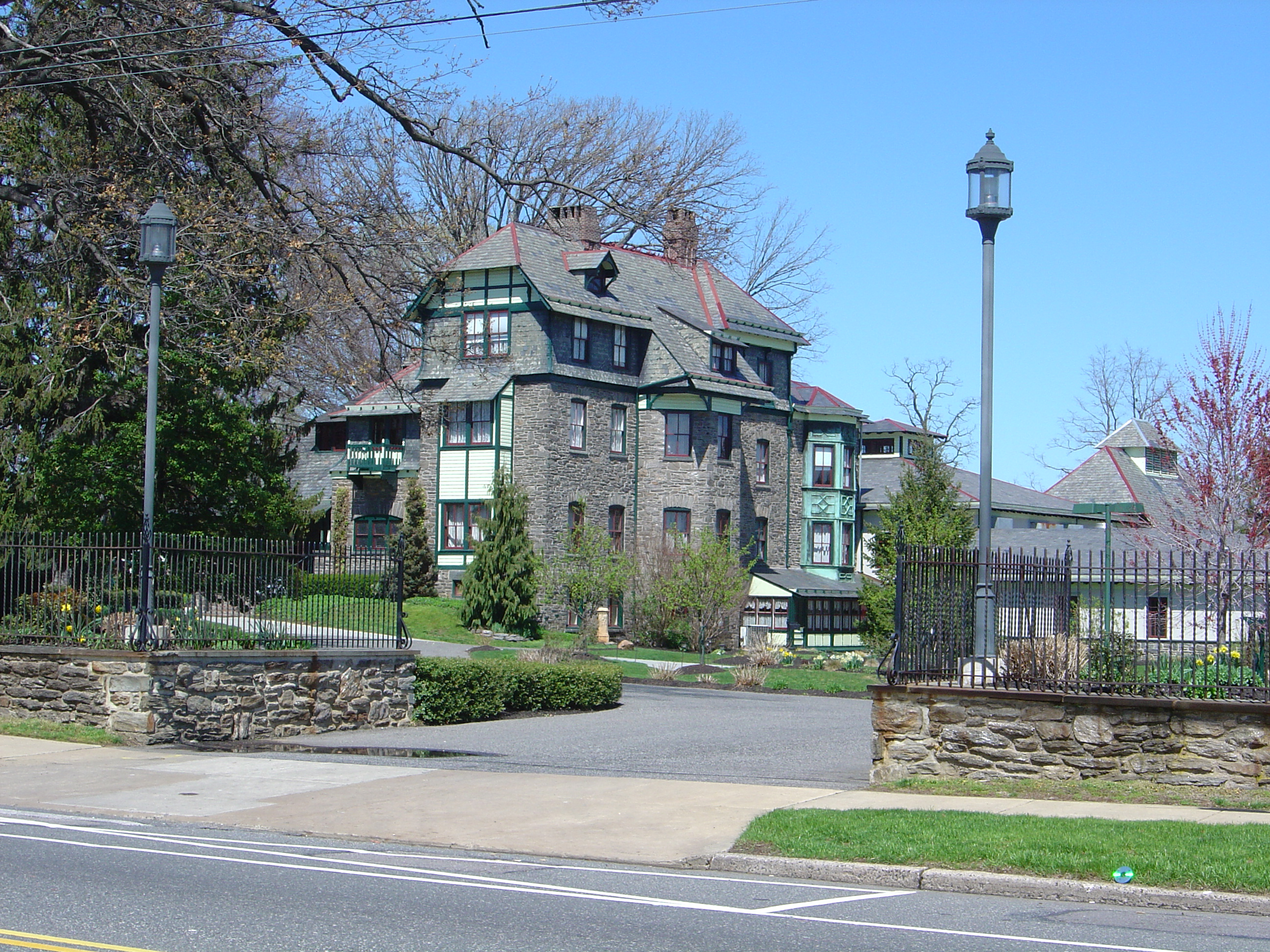
Knowlton Mansion

Fox Chase was the setting for one of America's longest running cold cases. In February 1957, the battered body of a small boy was found in a cardboard box off in the woods off Susquehanna Road. Investigators were mystified and were unable to determine his identity. Nicknamed "The Boy in the Box", "America's Unknown Child", and sometimes "The Fox Chase Boy". He was identified as Joseph Augustus Zarelli in 2022.

== Location and surrounding areas ==
The Fox Chase section is located on the border with Montgomery County and there is an active and cooperative business community that crosses the county line into Rockledge and Huntingdon Valley.

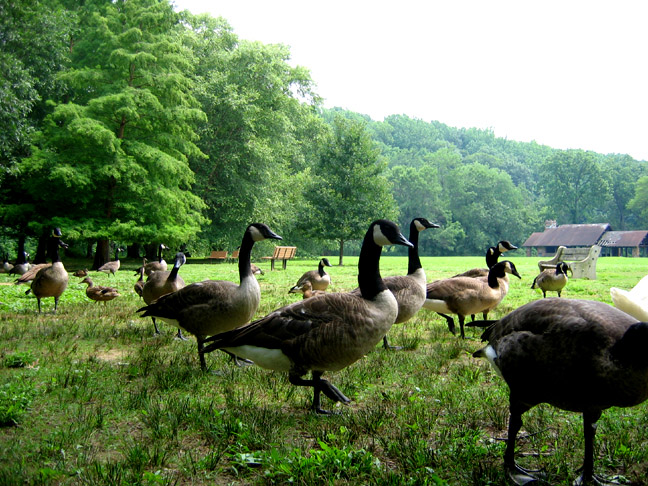
Pennypack Park in Fox Chase

One of many parks located within Fox Chase is Pennypack Park. It is composed of woodlands, meadows and wetlands. The banks of the Pennypack Creek runs through the park from Pine Road in Fox Chase all the way to the Delaware River. The area also includes playgrounds, hiking and bike trails as well as bridle paths for horseback riding. The Pennypack Environmental Center on Verree Road is also located within the neighborhood. Many historic structures are still intact throughout Fox Chase. The Verree House on Verree Road was the site of a raid by British troops during the American Revolutionary War. The trained eye can rediscover abandoned railroad grades, remnants of early mills, mill races and other reminders that generations of mankind have gathered in the "Green Heart" of Northeast Philadelphia.

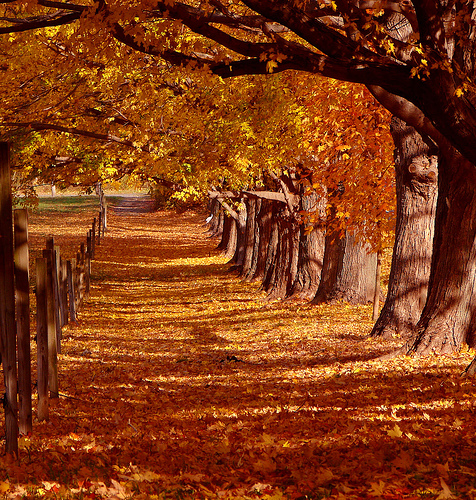
Fox Chase Farm seen from Pine Road

Fox Chase Farm is one of the few remaining active farms in Philadelphia County and is used extensively by the School District of Philadelphia. It began in 1683 as a land grant from William Penn to Lord Stanley and then passed to the McVeigh family for over 100 years. Later, the Wistar family developed it into a self-sufficient farm until it became a Gentlemen's Farm owned by two farmers, Lorimer and Butler. Friends of Fox Chase Farm, an all-volunteer group, currently assists in maintaining and preserving this pastoral treasure for present and future generations.

William Rhawn, president of the National Bank of the Republic in 1879, built a summer residence here. To design the project, he chose architect Frank Furness, whose work was synonymous with the mansions and public buildings of the Gilded Age. The banker's country estate includes a carriage house and gatekeeper's house. He called the estate “Knowlton” because it resembled the estate in England of Rhawn's wife's great-grandfather, John Knowles. It has since been converted into a catering establishment.

Ryerss Mansion

Ryerss Mansion is also located in Fox Chase. The house was built by merchant Joseph Waln Ryerss in 1859 and overlooks Burholme Park, one of the highest vistas in Philadelphia. The mansion is home to a large and eccentric collection of artifacts and antiquities from around the world, collected during the Ryerss family's extensive travels and other such excursions from Europe, to Africa, to the Far East.

Among the historic properties located in this neighborhood are:

- Knowlton Mansion, designed by Frank Furness; on the National Register of Historic Places
- Ryerss Mansion, home of Joseph Waln Ryerss; on the National Register of Historic Places
- The Verree House, site of a raid by British troops during the American Revolutionary War

== Demographics ==
The median age is 40.3 years for males and 43.1 years for females. Married couples made up 45.2 percent of the neighborhood's population. The neighborhood was 56.1 Caucasian, 12 percent Hispanic, 11.8 percent African American, 8.3 percent Asian, 2.6 percent mixed race, 1.9 percent Native American and 7.1 percent other race.

The median household income for Fox Chase was $89,788 in 2023, compared with $60,302 for Philadelphia as a whole. The population below the poverty level in Fox Chase was 8.8 percent, compared with 20.3 percent for Philadelphia.

== Business ==
The largest employer of Fox Chase is the internationally known Fox Chase Cancer Center, a unique facility that merges cancer research with the treatment of cancer. Its researchers have won Nobel Prizes for their contributions.

== Transportation ==
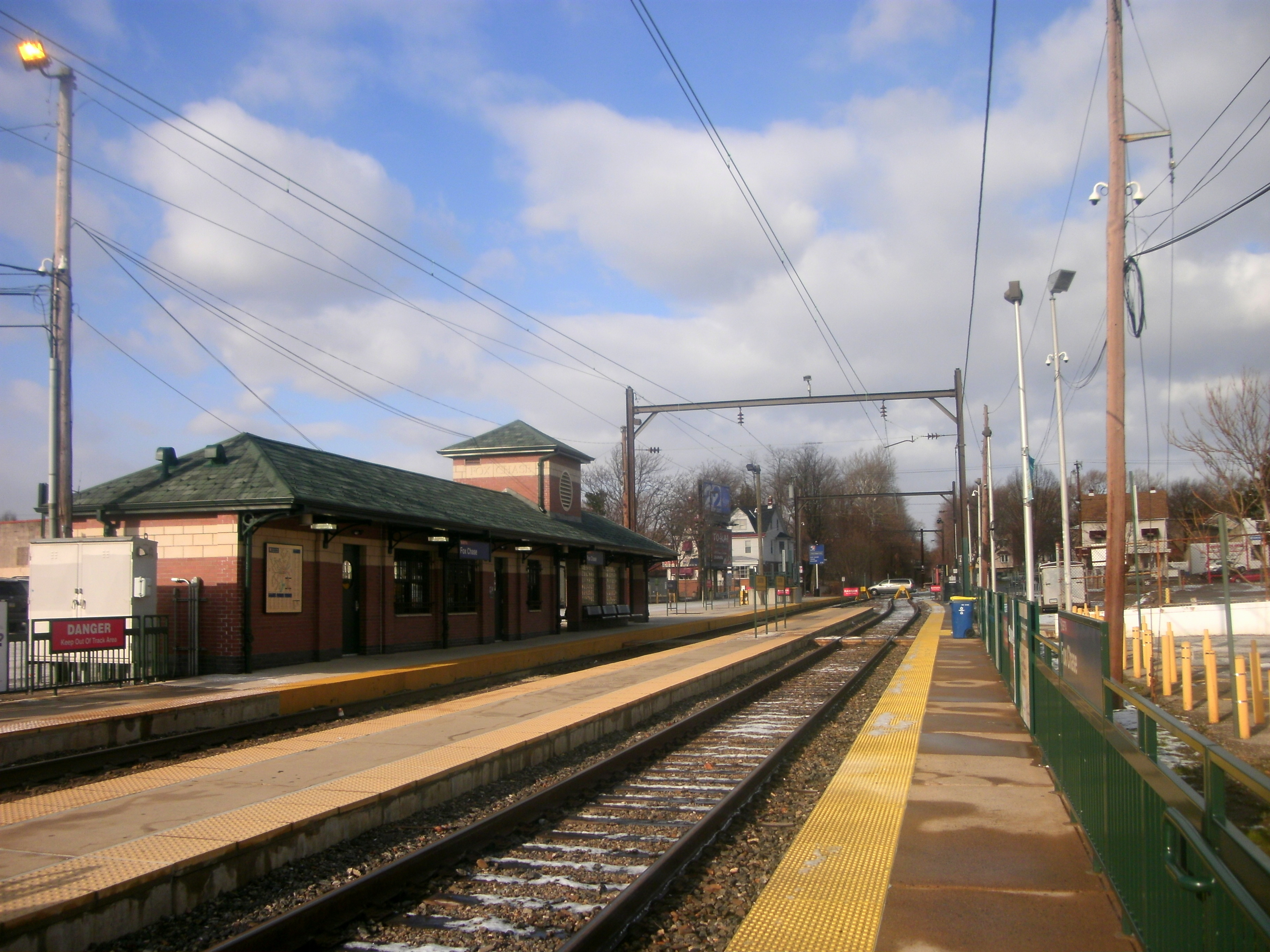
Fox Chase SEPTA station

Public transportation is provided by several SEPTA bus routes and the Fox Chase Line regional rail service which terminates near Rhawn Street and Oxford Avenue.

== Education ==
=== Public libraries ===
The Fox Chase Branch of the Philadelphia Free Library is located at 501 Rhawn St. at Jeanes Street.

=== Schools ===
Fox Chase Elementary School a.k.a. Fox Chase Academics Plus School is a public elementary school of the School District of Philadelphia. Located at 500 Rhawn St. near the library, it serves children grades K to 5.

Students move on to Baldi Middle School, and George Washington High School.

Saint Cecilia is a Roman Catholic School, from grades Pre-K to 8. Saint Cecilia's is a part of the Archdiocese of Philadelphia. Saint Cecilia School and church is located on 535 Rhawn St.

== Houses of worship ==
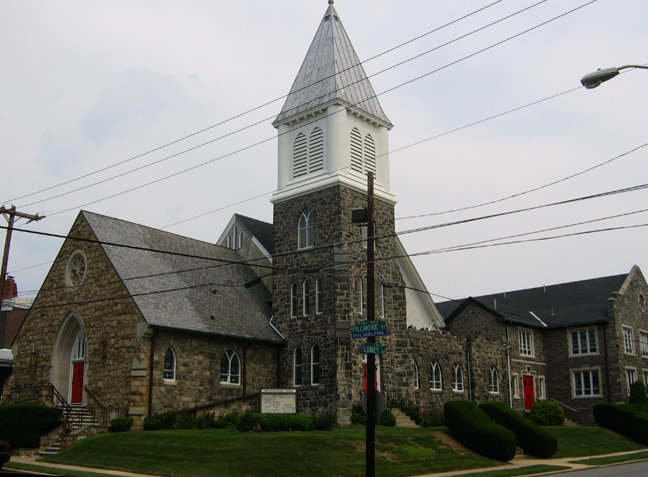
Fox Chase United Methodist Church, Loney & Fillmore Streets

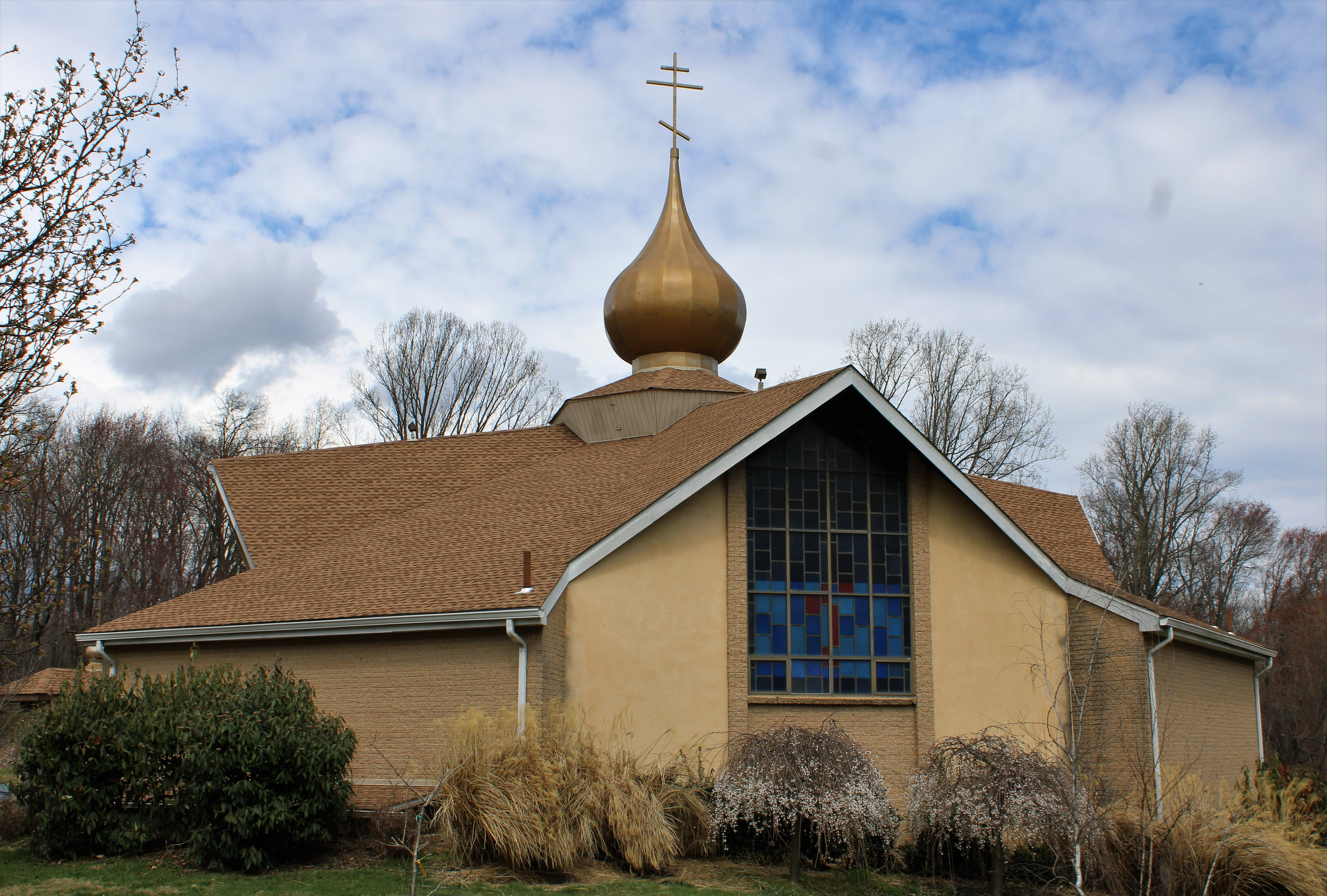
St. Stephen Orthodox Cathedral, Verree Road

- Fox Chase United Methodist Church is located at 201 Loney St. at the intersection of Filmore and Loney streets.
- St. Cecilia Catholic Church, 535 Rhawn St., also has a school with grades from kindergarten to eighth grade. The "new" church opened in 1955 and the first church was located just to the west of the "new" church. It was built underground with the expectations of adding an upper level, but the depression in 1929 and World War II caused this addition to be held off until 1955.
- St. Stephen Orthodox Cathedral is located at 8598 Verree Road (next to Pennypack Park).
- Bethel International Missions Center, 460 Rhawn St., a Brazilian congregation.
- Memorial Presbyterian Church of Fox Chase, 7902 Oxford Ave., founded in 1884.

== Location ==
Fox Chase's boundaries are:

- Northeast/East, Pennypack Creek (Bustleton, Philadelphia, Pennsylvania)
- West/Northwest, Filmore Street (Rockledge, Pennsylvania and Abington, Pennsylvania)
- Southwest, Township Line Road (Cheltenham, Pennsylvania)
- South, Cottman Avenue (Lawncrest, Philadelphia, Cheltenham Township and Elkins Park, Pennsylvania)
- East, Algon Avenue (Rhawnhurst section of Philadelphia)

== Notable residents ==
- Erick Stakelbeck (born 1976), author and television host

== See also ==
- Fox Chase Cancer Center
- Knowlton Mansion
