= Outline of Philadelphia =

City in Pennsylvania, US

Flag of Philadelphia

Seal of Philadelphia

The following outline is provided as an overview of and topical guide to Philadelphia:

Philadelphia is the largest city in the Commonwealth of Pennsylvania, the second-largest city on the East Coast of the United States after New York City, and the fifth-most-populous city in the United States.

Philadelphia is located in the Northeastern United States along the Delaware and Schuylkill rivers, and it is the only consolidated city-county in Pennsylvania. As of the 2010 census, the city had a population of 1,526,006, growing to 1,547,607 in 2012 by Census estimates. Philadelphia is the economic and cultural center of the Philadelphia metropolitan area, home to over 6 million people and the country's sixth-largest metropolitan area.

== General information ==
Location of Philadelphia

- Pronunciation: /ˌfɪləˈdɛlfiə/
- Common English name(s): Philadelphia
- Official English name(s): City of Philadelphia
- Nicknames of Philadelphia
  - Philly
  - The City of Brotherly Love
- Adjectival(s): Philadelphian
- Demonym(s): Philadelphians
- Rankings
  - largest city in Pennsylvania
  - second largest city on the East Coast
  - fifth-most populous city in the U.S.

== Geography of Philadelphia ==
- Philadelphia is: a city in the state of Pennsylvania, in the United States
- Atlas of Philadelphia
- Population of Philadelphia
  - 2010 U.S. Census: 1,526,006 people
  - 2000 U.S. Census: 1,517,550 people (to see why the city shrank, see White flight)
  - 1950 U.S. Census: 2,071,605 people
- Land area of Philadelphia: 134.101 sq mi

=== Location of Philadelphia ===
- Philadelphia is situated within the following regions:
  - Northern Hemisphere
  - Western Hemisphere
    - North America
      - Northern America
        - United States
          - Pennsylvania
            - Philadelphia metropolitan area
- Time zone(s): Eastern Time Zone (UTC−05:00)

=== Environment of Philadelphia ===
- Climate of Philadelphia

=== Landforms of Philadelphia ===
- Delaware River
- Schuylkill River

=== Areas of Philadelphia ===
==== Districts of Philadelphia ====
- Center City

==== Neighborhoods in Philadelphia ====
- List of Philadelphia neighborhoods

=== Locations in Philadelphia ===
- List of sites of interest in Philadelphia

=== Demographics of Philadelphia ===
Demographics of Philadelphia

== Law and government in Philadelphia ==
- List of mayors of Philadelphia
- Philadelphia City Council
- Philadelphia Police Department
- Crime in Philadelphia
  - Black Mafia
  - K&A Gang
  - Philadelphia crime family
  - Philadelphia Greek Mob

== History of Philadelphia ==
- History of Philadelphia

=== History of Philadelphia, by period ===
- History of the area before the founding of Philadelphia
  - Lenape (Native American tribe)
    - Shackamaxon
  - New Sweden
  - Dutch colonization
    - New Netherland
      - Treaty of Westminster (1674)
- Province of Pennsylvania
  - William Penn – founder of the Province of Pennsylvania (a British colony), also founded Philadelphia
- Benjamin Franklin
  - Pennsylvania Gazette (1729) – located in Philadelphia, Ben Franklin purchased an existing newspaper, and shortened its name to this.
  - Library Company of Philadelphia (1731)
  - Poor Richard's Almanack (1733)
  - Union Fire Company (1736)
  - American Philosophical Society (1743)
  - 111th Infantry Regiment (1747)
  - The Academy and College of Philadelphia (1749) – was merged in 1791 with the University of the State of Pennsylvania to become the University of Pennsylvania.
  - Pennsylvania Hospital (1751)
- Construction of Pennsylvania State House completed (1753) – built for the colonial legislature of the Province of Pennsylvania. It was the building in which the United States was born. Now it is known as Independence Hall.
- American Revolution
  - First Continental Congress
  - Second Continental Congress (1775-1787) – headquartered in Independence Hall, in Philadelphia, the Congress acted as the de facto national government of what became the United States, by raising armies, directing strategy, appointing diplomats, and making formal treaties.
    - United States Declaration of Independence (July 4, 1776) – succession of the Thirteen Colonies from the Kingdom of Great Britain, enacted by the Continental Congress. This made Philadelphia the first capital of the United States, by virtue of the Continental Congress being headquartered there.
    - American Revolutionary War (1775–1783)
      - Articles of Confederation (November 15, 1777)
      - Philadelphia campaign (1777–1778) – British initiative to gain control of Philadelphia, which was then the seat of the Second Continental Congress.
        - Capture of Philadelphia (1777)
      - Pennsylvania Mutiny of 1783 – anti-government protest by nearly 400 soldiers of the Continental Army in June 1783. The mutiny, and the refusal of the Executive Council of Pennsylvania to stop it, ultimately resulted in Congress vacating Philadelphia and the creation of the District of Columbia to serve as the national capital.
- Philadelphia as state capital (1776-1799)
  - Pennsylvania Constitution of 1776
    - Supreme Executive Council of the Commonwealth of Pennsylvania
    - State capital (1776-1799)
- Philadelphia Convention (May 25 to September 17, 1787) – met in Independence Hall, where the states' delegates created the United States Constitution, placing the Convention among the most significant events in the history of the United States.
  - Drafting of the Constitution of the United States (1787)
- Temporary capital of the United States (1790-1800) – Philadelphia served as the country's temporary capital while Washington, D.C. was being planned and developed.
- Philadelphia during World War II
  - Philadelphia Experiment

== Culture in Philadelphia ==
Culture of Philadelphia

- Architecture of Philadelphia
  - List of tallest buildings in Philadelphia
- Cuisine of Philadelphia
  - Cheesesteak
- Language in Philadelphia
  - Philadelphia dialect
- Media in Philadelphia
- Museums in Philadelphia
- List of people from Philadelphia
- Symbols of Philadelphia
  - Flag of Philadelphia
  - Seal of Philadelphia

=== Art in Philadelphia ===
- Music of Philadelphia
  - Philadelphia soul
- Public art in Philadelphia

=== Religion in Philadelphia ===
- Christianity in Philadelphia
  - Diocese of Philadelphia
  - Catholicism in Philadelphia
    - Roman Catholic Archdiocese of Philadelphia
    - Ukrainian Catholic Archeparchy of Philadelphia
- Judaism in Philadelphia
  - History of the Jews in Philadelphia

=== Sports in Philadelphia ===
Sports in Philadelphia

- South Philadelphia Sports Complex
  - Lincoln Financial Field ("The Linc") – home to the Philadelphia Eagles (football team)
  - Citizens Bank Park – home to the Philadelphia Phillies (baseball team)
  - Xfinity Mobile Arena – home to the:
    - Philadelphia Flyers (hockey team)
    - Philadelphia 76ers (basketball team)
    - Philadelphia Wings (lacrosse team)
- Philadelphia Sports Hall of Fame
- Baseball in Philadelphia
  - Philadelphia Phillies
  - Baseball parks in Philadelphia
  - Philadelphia Baseball Wall of Fame
- Basketball in Philadelphia
  - Philadelphia 76ers
- Football in Philadelphia
  - American football in Philadelphia
    - Philadelphia Eagles
  - Soccer in Philadelphia
    - Philadelphia Union (soccer team)
- Hockey in Philadelphia
  - Philadelphia Flyers
- Lacrosse in Philadelphia
  - Philadelphia Wings
- Running in Philadelphia
  - Philadelphia Marathon

== Economy and infrastructure of Philadelphia ==
Economy of Philadelphia

- List of companies based in the Philadelphia area
- Public services in Philadelphia
  - Philadelphia Fire Department
  - Philadelphia Police Department
  - Philadelphia Public Library
- Tourism in Philadelphia
  - List of sites of interest in Philadelphia

=== Transportation in Philadelphia ===
Transportation in Philadelphia

- Philadelphia subway (disambiguation)
  - List of SEPTA Metro stations

== Education in Philadelphia ==
- Education in Philadelphia

== See also ==
- Outline of geography
