= Economy of Philadelphia =

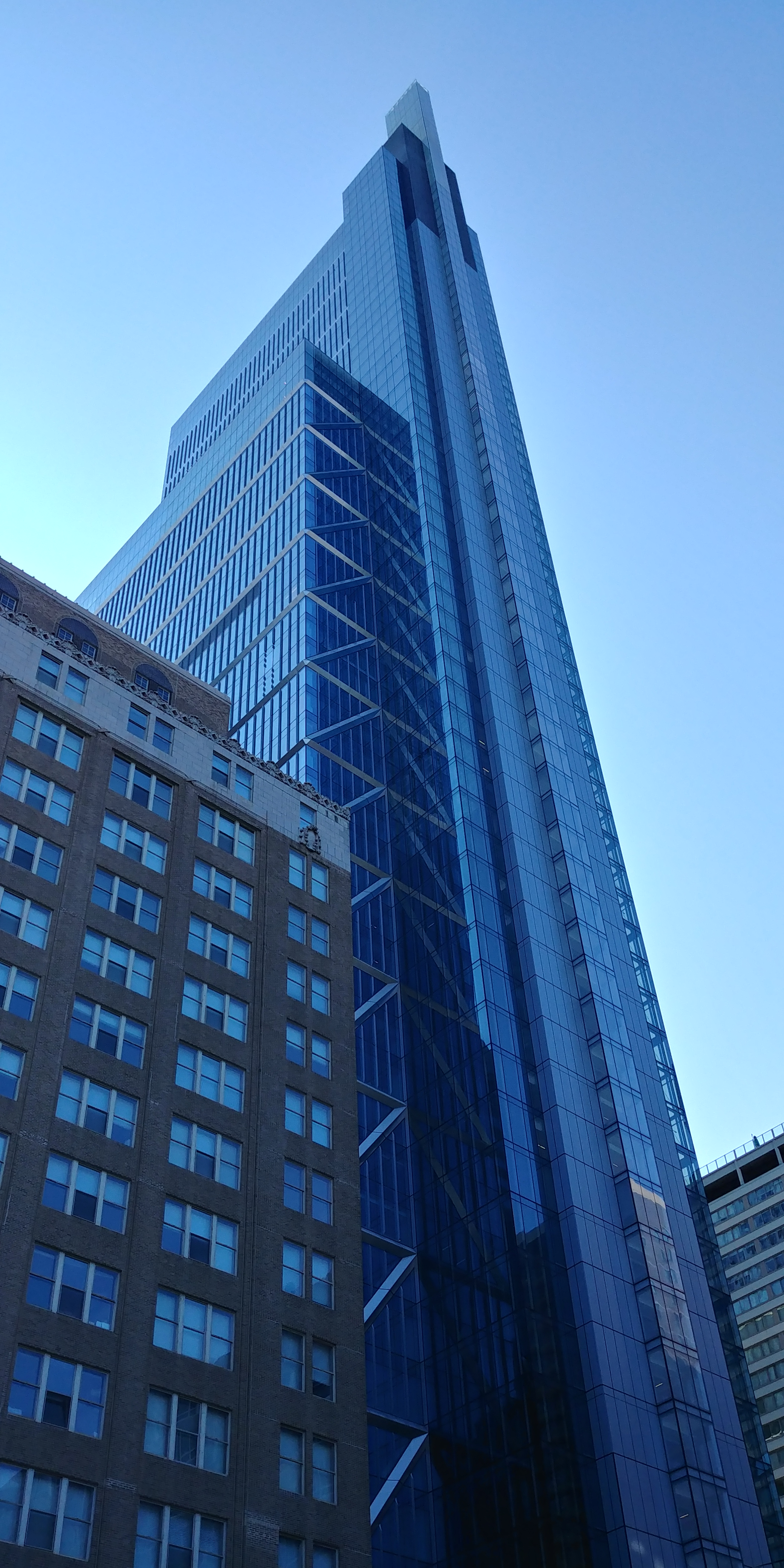
At 1,121 feet (342 m) high, Comcast Technology Center in Center City Philadelphia is Pennsylvania's tallest building and the 14th-tallest building in the United States.

The economy of Philadelphia encompasses the city of Philadelphia, the center of economic activity in both Pennsylvania and the four-state Delaware Valley metropolitan region of the United States. Philadelphia's close geographical and transportation connections to other large metropolitan economies along the East Coast of the United States have been cited as offering a significant competitive advantage for business creation and entrepreneurship. Five Fortune 500 companies are headquartered in the city. As of 2023, the Philadelphia metropolitan area was estimated to produce a gross metropolitan product (GMP) of US$557.6 billion, representing the eleventh-largest U.S. metropolitan economy. Philadelphia was rated by the GaWC as a 'Beta' city in its 2016 ranking of world cities.

Philadelphia has shifted to an information technology and service-based economy. Philadelphia and the Delaware Valley are a biotechnology hub. As of 2025, metropolitan Philadelphia had entered the ranks of the top five U.S. venture capital centers, facilitated by its proximity to New York City and its entrepreneurial and financial ecosystems. Metropolitan Philadelphia ranks as one of the nation's Big Five venture capital hubs, facilitated by its proximity to both the financial ecosystems of New York City and the regulatory environment of Washington, D.C. Philadelphia is also a biotechnology hub and has garnered the nickname "Cellicon Valley" for its central role in the development of immunotherapies to treat different cancers. Financial activities account for the largest sector of the metro economy, and it is one of the largest health education and research centers in the United States. The city is also home to the Philadelphia Stock Exchange, owned by Nasdaq. Philadelphia's history attracts many tourists, with the Liberty Bell receiving over 2 million visitors in 2010.

== Economic sectors ==
Philadelphia's economic sectors include higher education, manufacturing, oil refining, food processing, health care and biotechnology, telecommunications, tourism and financial services.

== Federal presence ==
The federal government has several institutions in Philadelphia. The city served as the capital city of the United States, before the construction of Washington, D.C. Today, the East Coast operations of the United States Mint are based near the historic district, and the Federal Reserve Bank's Philadelphia division is based there as well. Philadelphia is also home to the U.S. District Court for the Eastern District of Pennsylvania and the U.S. Court of Appeals for the Third Circuit.

== Fortune 500 corporations ==
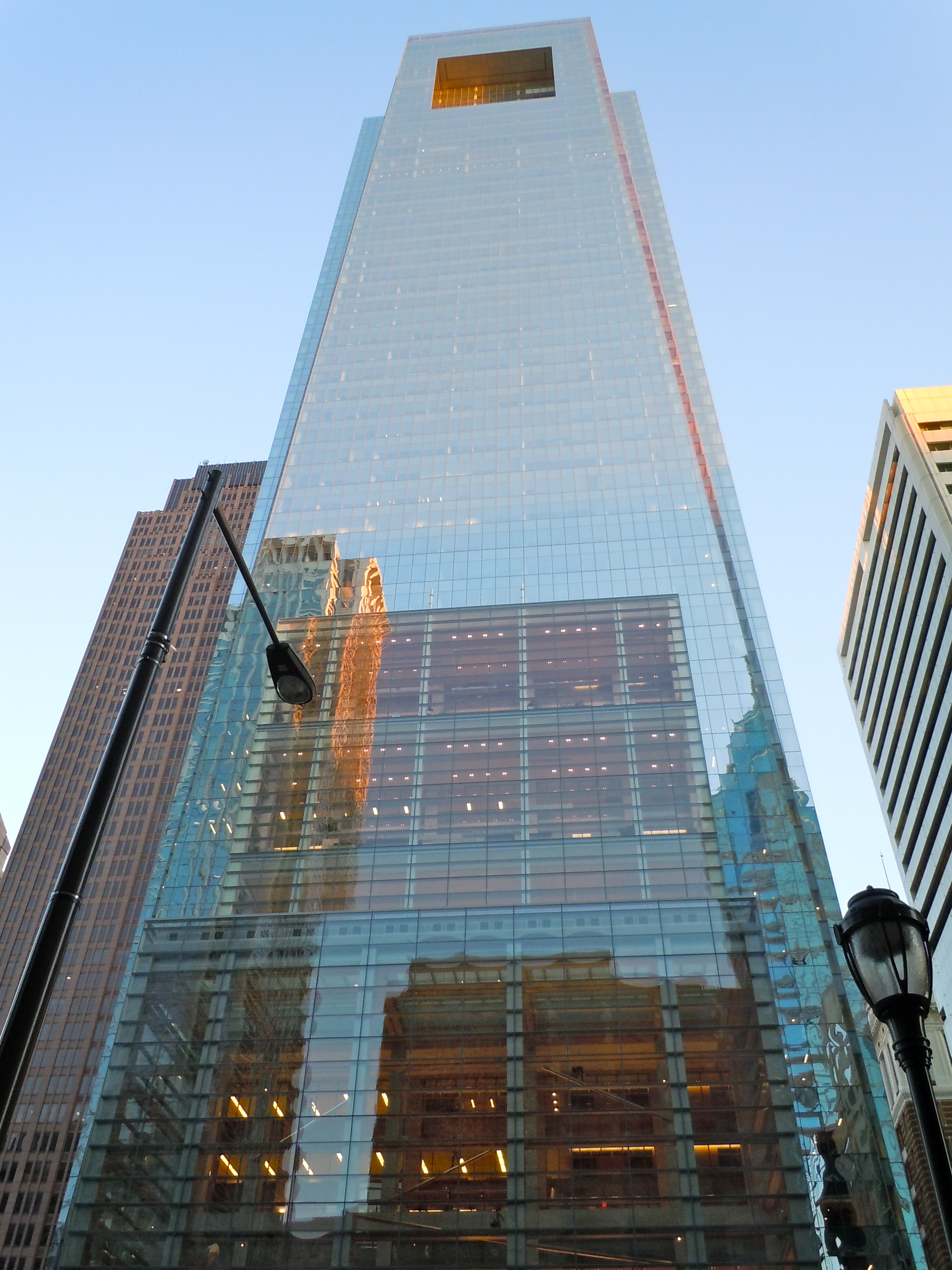
Comcast Center in Center City Philadelphia, headquarters of the nation's largest multinational telecommunications conglomerate

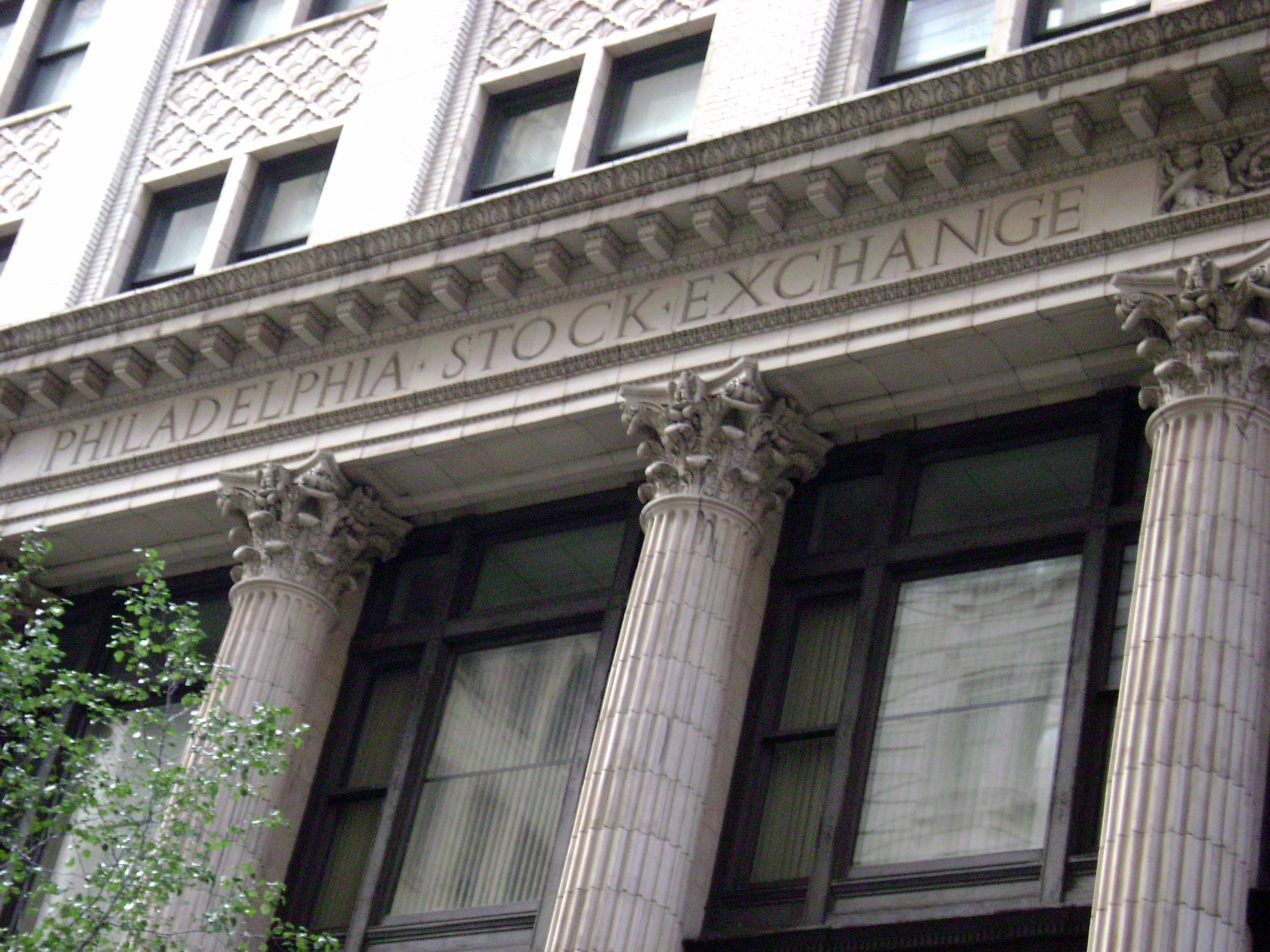
The Philadelphia Stock Exchange at 11 Walnut Street is the oldest stock exchange in the United States.

The Philadelphia metropolitan area contains the headquarters of twelve Fortune 500 corporations, four of which are in Philadelphia proper.

The Philadelphia Stock Exchange, acquired by NASDAQ in 2007, tracks the Philadelphia semiconductor Index, known in financial circles as the SOX. The city is home to the headquarters of cable television and internet service provider Comcast, insurance companies Cigna, Colonial Penn, and Independence Blue Cross, food services company Aramark, chemical makers FMC Corporation and Rohm and Haas, pharmaceutical companies GlaxoSmithKline, Amicus Therapeutics, Spark Therapeutics, apparel retailers Five Below and Urban Outfitters, and its subsidiary Anthropologie, automotive parts retailer Pep Boys, and stainless steel producer Carpenter Technology Corporation. Other corporation headquarters in the city include Crown Holdings and Brandywine Realty Trust. The headquarters of Boeing Rotorcraft Systems and its main rotorcraft factory are in the Philadelphia suburb of Ridley Park; The Vanguard Group and the U.S. headquarters of Siemens Healthineers are headquartered in Malvern, Pennsylvania, a Philadelphia suburb; healthcare conglomerate AmerisourceBergen is headquartered in suburban Conshohocken, Pennsylvania; and the Campbell's and automobile manufacturer Subaru USA are headquartered across the Delaware River in adjacent Camden, New Jersey.

== Rail transit ==
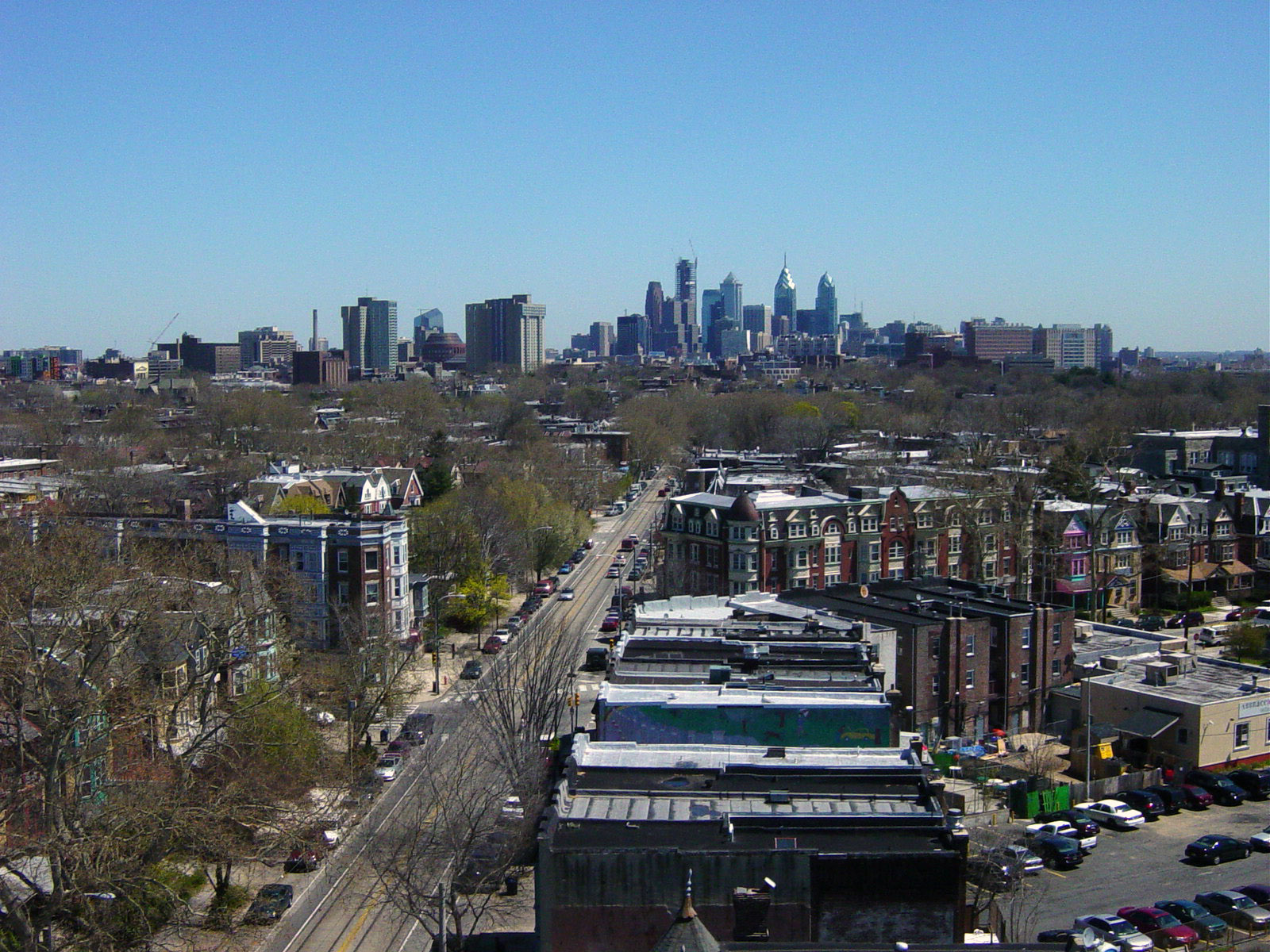
Baltimore Avenue towards Center City Philadelphia in 2007

With the historic presence of the Pennsylvania Railroad, and the large ridership at 30th Street Station, Amtrak maintains a significant presence in the city. These jobs include customer service representatives and ticket processing and other behind-the-scenes personnel, in addition to the normal functions of the railroad.

== Legal sector ==
The city is home to the law schools of Temple, Penn, and Drexel, and the metro area includes Rutgers (Camden), Villanova, and Widener.

The headquarters of the American Law Institute (publisher of Restatements of the Law) is located in the city as are the federal Third Circuit Court of Appeals and Eastern District of Pennsylvania.

Ten of the 100 largest law firms in the US have their headquarters or largest office in Philadelphia.

== Medical facilities ==
Philadelphia is an important center for medicine, a distinction that it has held since the colonial period. The city is home to the first hospital in the British North American colonies, Pennsylvania Hospital, and the first medical school in what is now the United States, at the University of Pennsylvania (Penn). Penn, the city's largest private employer, also runs a large teaching hospital and extensive medical system. There are also major hospitals affiliated with Temple University School of Medicine, Drexel University College of Medicine, Thomas Jefferson University (Thomas Jefferson University Hospital), and Philadelphia College of Osteopathic Medicine. Philadelphia also has three distinguished children's hospitals: Children's Hospital of Philadelphia, the nation's first pediatric hospital (located adjacent to the Hospital of the University of Pennsylvania), St. Christopher's Hospital, and the Shriners' Hospital. In the city's northern section are Albert Einstein Medical Center, and in the northeast section, Fox Chase Cancer Center. Together, health care is the largest sector of employment in the city. Several medical professional associations are headquartered in Philadelphia.

With Philadelphia's importance as a medical research center, the region supports the pharmaceutical industry. GlaxoSmithKline, AstraZeneca, Wyeth, Merck, GE Healthcare, Johnson and Johnson and Siemens Medical Solutions are just some of the large pharmaceutical companies with operations in the region. The city is also home to the nation's first school of pharmacy, the Philadelphia College of Pharmacy, now called the University of the Sciences in Philadelphia.

== Tourism ==
Tourism is a major industry in Philadelphia, which was the 11th-most-visited city in the United States in 2008. It welcomed 710,000 visitors from foreign countries in 2008, up 29% from the previous year.

=== Shopping ===
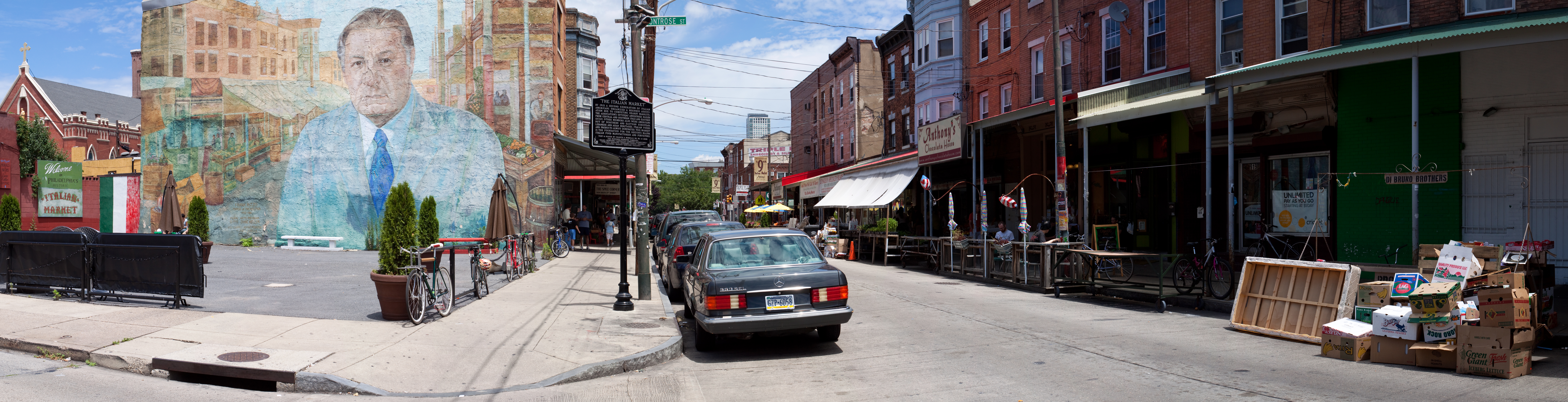
The Italian Market in South Philadelphia is a major Philadelphian landmark.

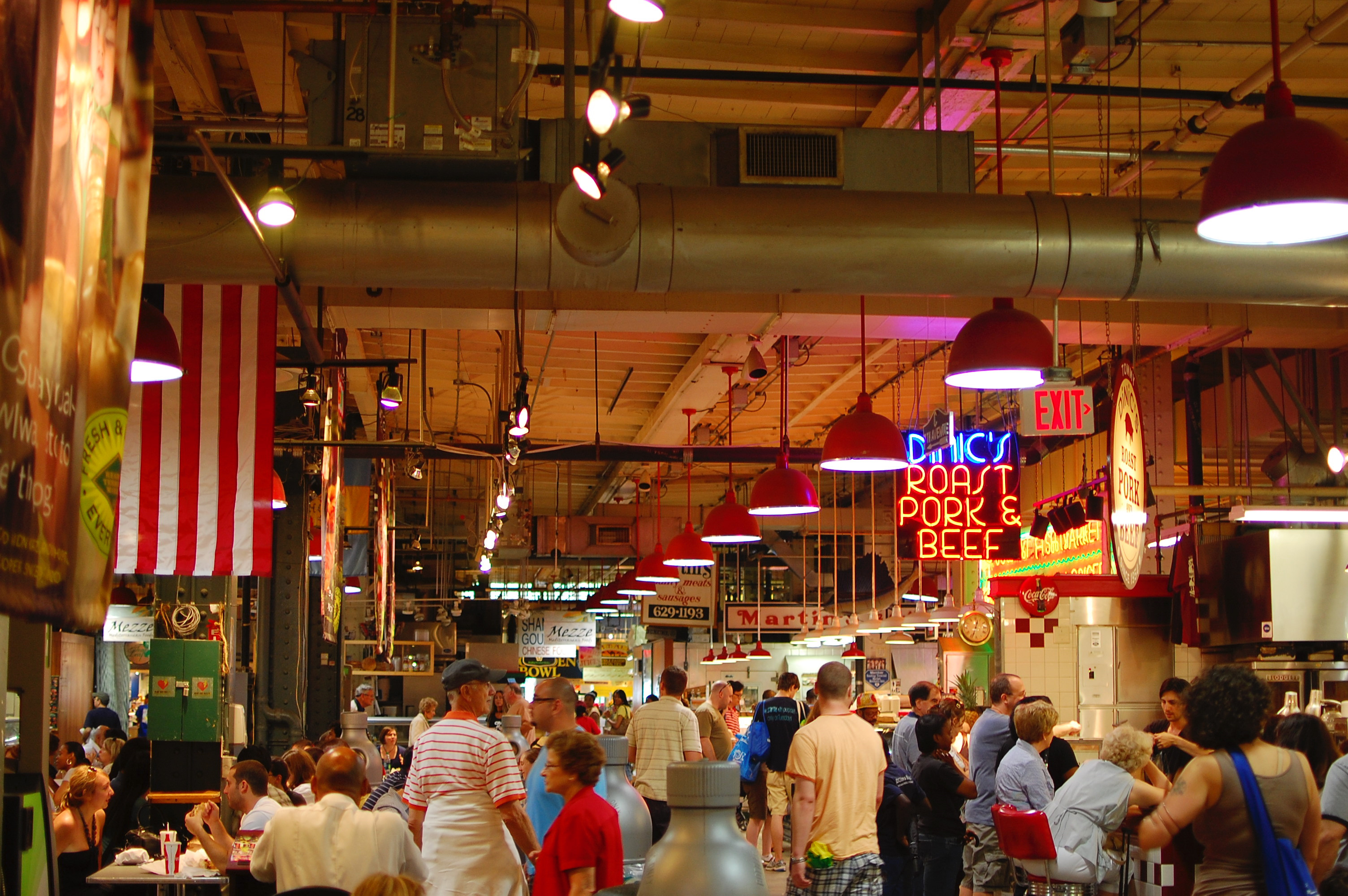
Reading Terminal Market in Center City is one of America's oldest and largest public markets.

Shopping options in Center City include Fashion District Philadelphia, The Shops at Liberty Place, Jewelers' Row, South Street, Old City's 3rd Street Corridor, and a wide variety of standalone independent retailers. The Rittenhouse area, known as Philadelphia's outdoor shopping mall, includes Rittenhouse Row, a four-block section of Walnut Street, which has higher-end clothing chain stores and some hipster-inspired clothing stores. The parallel streets of Sansom and Chestnut have some high-end boutiques and clothing retailers. Old City, especially the 3rd Street corridor, has locally owned independent boutiques and art/design galleries. Midway between Old City and Broad Street is the Reading Terminal Market, with dozens of take-out restaurants, specialty food vendors, and small grocery store operators, a few of which are operated by Amish farmers from nearby Lancaster County.

Philadelphia has a few eclectic neighborhood shopping districts, which generally consist of a few blocks along a major neighborhood thoroughfare, such as in Manayunk or Chestnut Hill. The Italian Market in South Philadelphia offers groceries, meats, cheeses and housewares, historically from Italy, but now from many nationalities. Two famed cheesesteak restaurants, Geno's and Pat's, are located nearby.

There are several large shopping malls and strip malls in the region, including Philadelphia Mills in Northeast Philadelphia, and many in the suburbs, most notably the King of Prussia Mall in King of Prussia, Pennsylvania, 19 miles (31 km) from the heart of the city. The King of Prussia mall is the largest shopping mall on the U.S. East Coast and the largest in the country in terms of leasable retail space.

=== Innovation ===
During the 20th century, the city and its suburbs were a focal point of retail innovation. Suburban Square in Ardmore, is sometimes considered the first modern shopping center in the world. Built in stages from 1927 to 1931, it was one of the first institutions to define the Philadelphia Main Line in the 1920s. Since then, large malls such as the Cherry Hill and King of Prussia malls have opened nearby.

Some of the first modern discount stores followed. Defunct chains such as Kmart, Bradlees, Caldor, Jamesway, Ames, Woolco, Two Guys, Hills Department Stores, Zayre, Richway, Korvettes, Nichols, Gaylords, Murphy Mart, and later Value City were concentrated in Philadelphia and other East Coast markets. This growth occurred largely during the 1950s–1970s, before the national growth of Walmart and Target in the 1980s.

Philadelphia was the home of many pioneering supermarket chains during the same period, many of which had trademark architecture. The longest-running of these is Acme, formerly known as American Stores and Super Saver. Many of these stores that have closed were replaced by franchises such as Shur-Fine, Supervalu, IGA, and Thriftway/Shop 'n Bag. Many other former supermarkets have become off-price stores such as Big Lots, Family Dollar, and Dollar General. Current major players in the region today include ShopRite, Save-a-Lot, Aldi, Giant-Carlisle, and local chain Genuardi's. Newer upscale chains include Whole Foods, Wegmans, and Trader Joe's. In nearby markets, Safeway, Stop & Shop, Giant-Landover, Kroger, and Food Lion operate. Drug chains CVS and Rite Aid are common in the region.

=== Innovation firsts ===
Philadelphia was the location of the first examples in the United States of a number of institutions, including:

- Advertising agency
- Art school & museum
- Botanical garden
- Cancer hospital
- De Facto Central Bank, Chartered by the Congress of the Confederation
- Central Bank, Chartered by the United States Congress
- Electronic computer
- Eye hospital
- Hospital
- Fire company
- Fire insurance company
- Labor union
- Medical school
- Mint
- Municipal water system
- Pediatric hospital
- Penitentiary
- Pharmacy school
- Post office
- Public library
- Savings bank
- Stock exchange
- Title insurance company
- University
- Zoo

== See also ==
- Outline of Philadelphia – Economy of Philadelphia
- Economy of Pennsylvania
