= Kennedy Crossan School =

- U.S. National Register of Historic Places
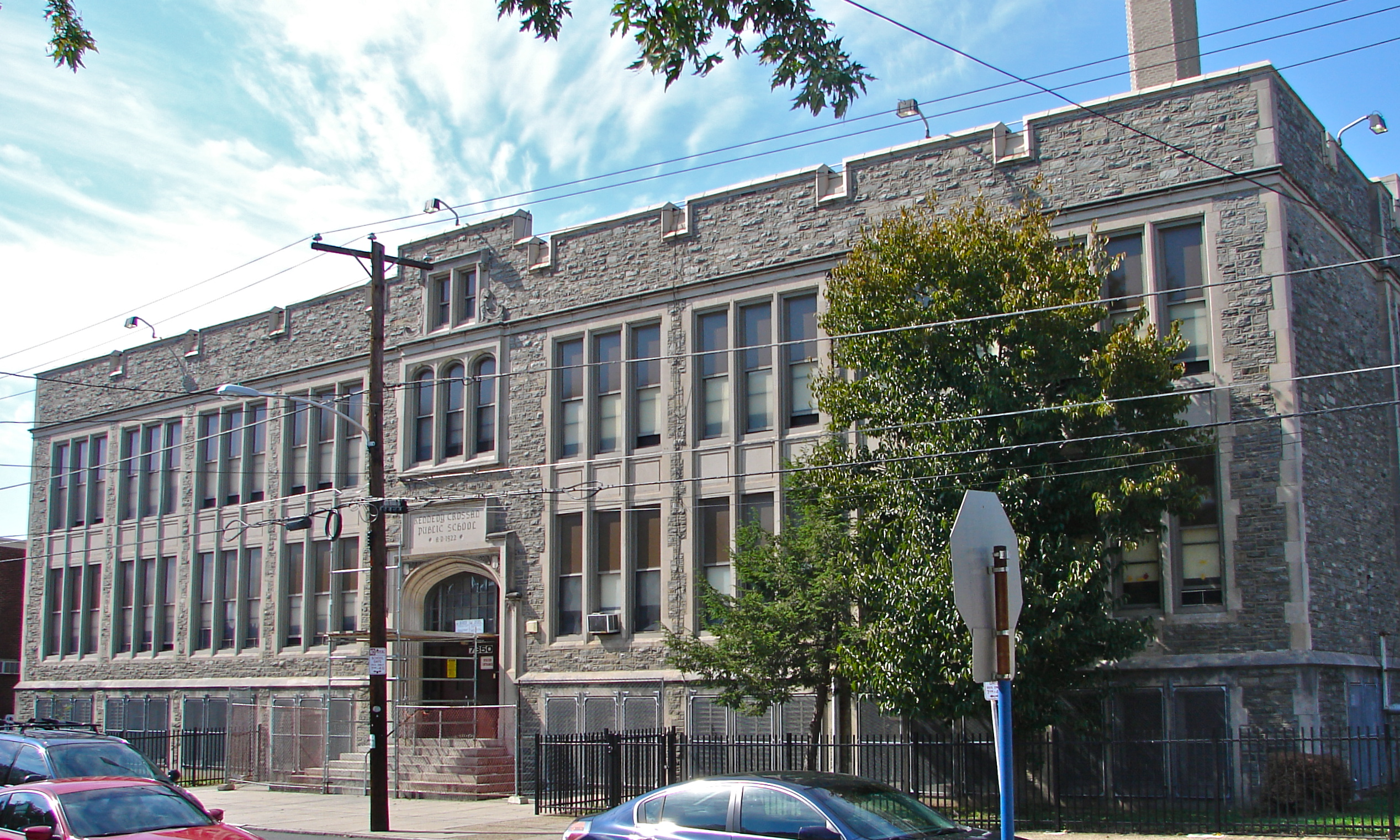
- Kennedy Crossan School, October 2010

- Location within Philadelphia Location within Pennsylvania Location within the United States
- Location: 7350 Bingham St., Philadelphia, Pennsylvania
- Coordinates: 40°03′44″N 75°04′53″W
- Area: 2 acres (0.81 ha)
- Built: 1922–1924
- Architect: Irwin T. Catharine
- Architectural style: Late Gothic Revival
- MPS: Philadelphia Public Schools TR
- NRHP reference No.: 88002261
- Added to NRHP: November 18, 1988

The Kennedy Crossan Academics Plus Elementary School is a historic, American elementary school building in the Burholme neighborhood of Philadelphia, Pennsylvania. It is part of the School District of Philadelphia.

The building was added to the National Register of Historic Places in 1988.

== History and architectural features ==
Designed by Irwin T. Catharine and built between 1922 and 1924, this historic structure is a two-story, nine-bay, brick building that sits on a raised basement. Created in the Late Gothic Revival style, it features a central entrance with arched opening and stone surround and a crenellated brick parapet.
