= Knowlton Mansion =

Historic house in Pennsylvania, United States

- U.S. National Register of Historic Places
- Pennsylvania state historical marker
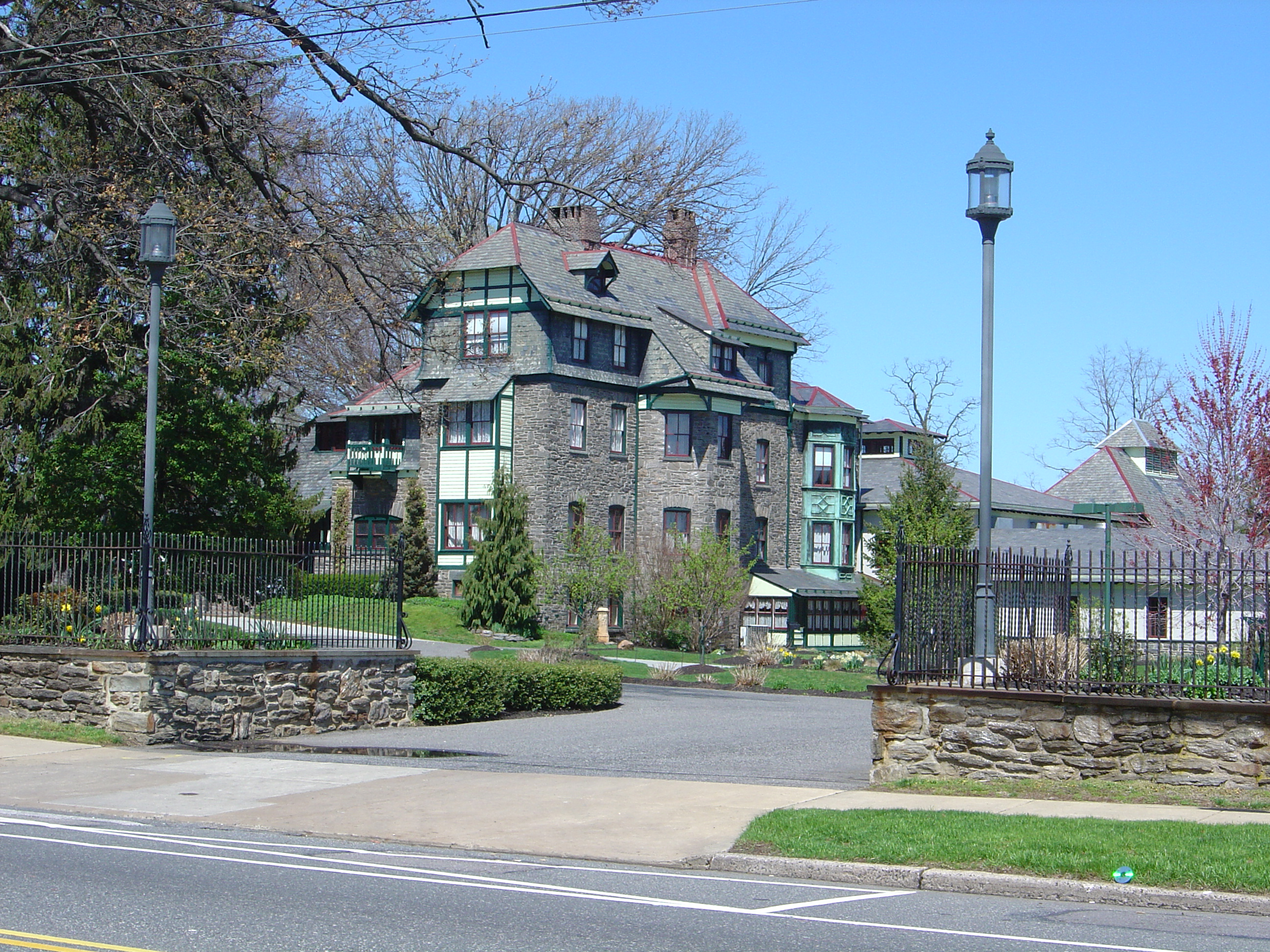

- Location within Philadelphia Location within Pennsylvania Location within the United States
- Location: Rhawn Street and Verree Road; Philadelphia, Pennsylvania, United States
- Coordinates: 40°4′23″N 75°4′28″W
- Area: 13 acres (5.3 ha)
- Built: 1881
- Architect: Frank Furness
- Architectural style: Gothic Revival
- NRHP reference No.: 74001803

Significant dates
- Added to NRHP: October 1, 1974
- Designated PHMC: November 12, 1994

Knowlton Mansion, also known as the Rhawn Residence, is an historic mansion that is located in the Fox Chase neighborhood of Philadelphia, Pennsylvania, United States.

The mansion was listed on the National Register of Historic Places in 1974.

== History and architectural features ==
The three-story mansion was designed in the Gothic Revival style by renowned nineteenth-century architect Frank Furness as a residence for William Rhawn, a successful Philadelphia banker. It was completed in 1881 and named after John Knowles, the great-grandfather of Rhawn's wife. It later served as the residence for Robert MacKay Green II, who was the son of Robert MacKay Green I, who invented ice cream soda in 1874.

The mansion was listed on the National Register of Historic Places in 1974. Today, it serves as the home to Conroy Catering. The first fundraiser held at Knowlton by Conroy Catering was for former State Representative Chris Wogan in December 1997.

== See also ==
- King, Moses. Philadelphia and Notable Philadelphians. New York: Blanchard Press, Isaac H. Blanchard Co., 1901, p. 85.
