= Burholme, Philadelphia =

Burholme
- Neighborhood of Philadelphia
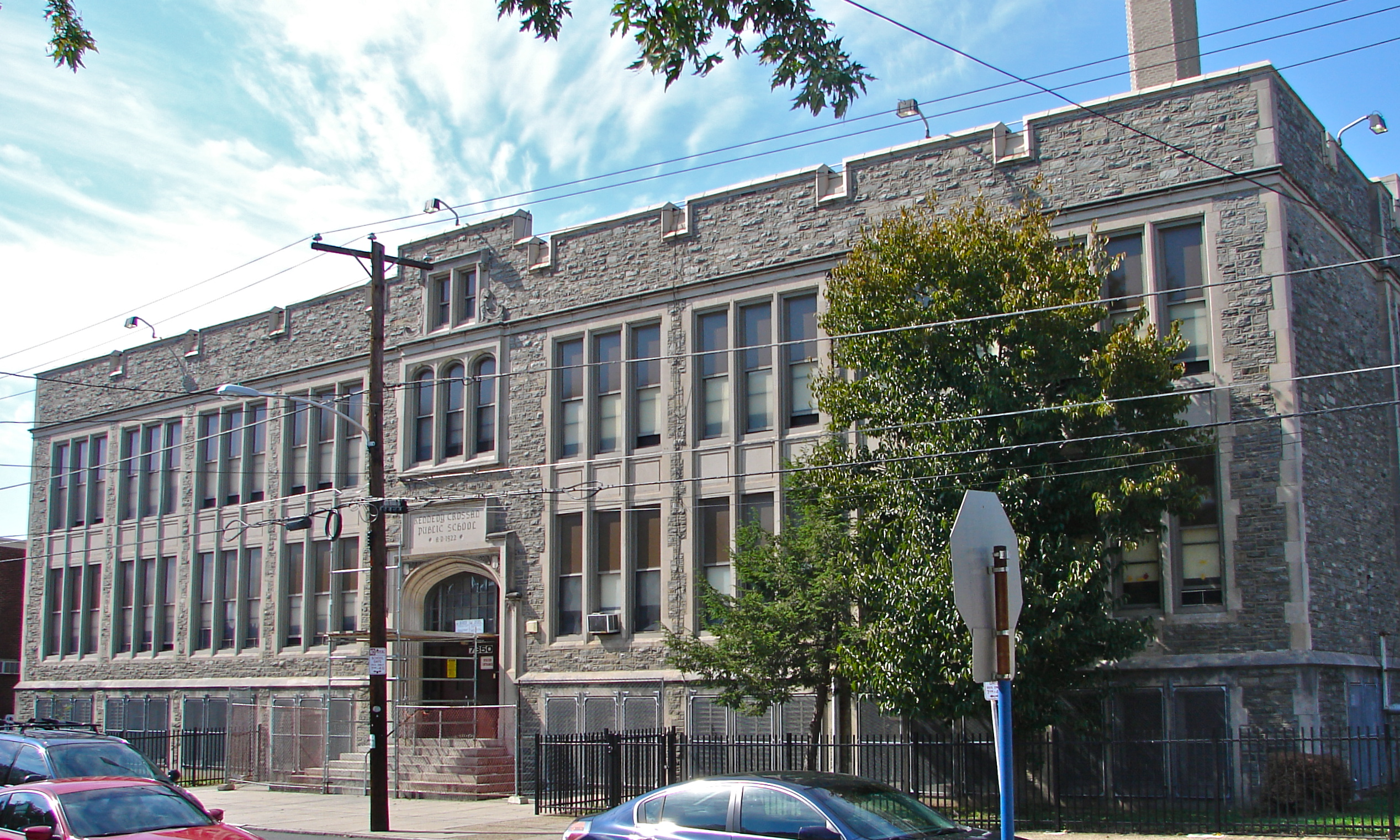
- Kennedy Crossan School in Burholme, October 2010

- Location within Philadelphia
- Country: United States
- State: Pennsylvania
- County: Philadelphia
- City: Philadelphia
- Area codes: 215, 267 and 445

Burholme is a neighborhood in the Northeast section of Philadelphia, Pennsylvania, United States.

The neighborhood is adjacent to Burholme Park, which is located in the Fox Chase section of Philadelphia.

The Kennedy Crossan School was listed on the National Register of Historic Places in 1988.
