= Fox Chase Farm =

- Stanley
- U.S. National Register of Historic Places
- U.S. Historic district
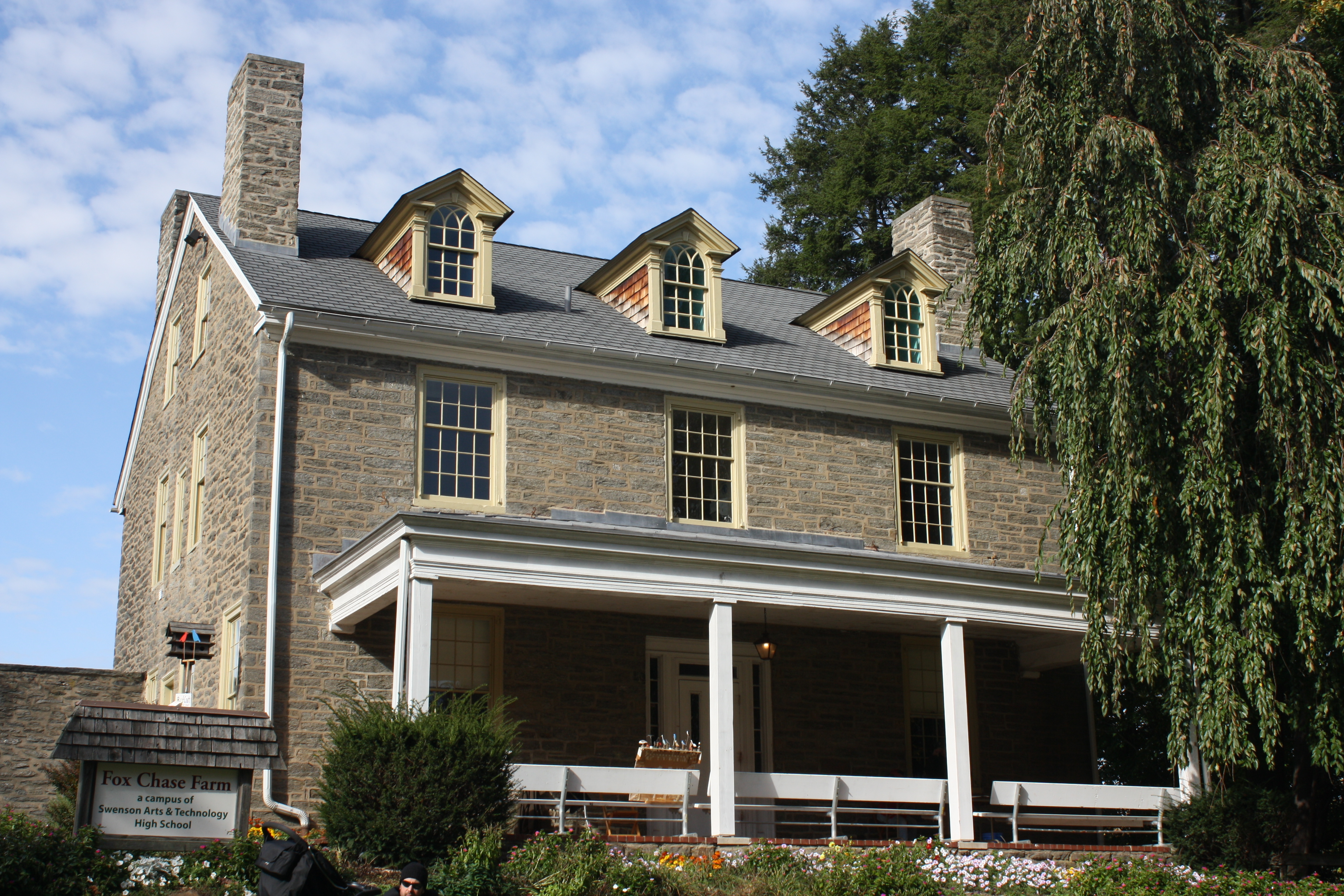
- Fox Chase Farm Manor House. October 2012.

- Location within Philadelphia Location within Pennsylvania Location within the United States
- Location: 8500 Pine Rd., Philadelphia, Pennsylvania
- Coordinates: 40°5′26″N 75°4′31″W
- Area: 112.3 acres (45.4 ha)
- Built: 1822
- Architect: Glancy, Irvin
- Architectural style: Federal, Stick/eastlake, et al.
- NRHP reference No.: 05000415
- Added to NRHP: May 10, 2005

Fox Chase Farm is one of two working farms in the city of Philadelphia, Pennsylvania (W.B. Saul High School's Farm in Roxborough is the other). Formerly owned by the Wistar family, the farm is located on Pine Road in the Fox Chase neighborhood of Northeast Philadelphia on the border with Montgomery County. The farm gradually became surrounded by the city's residential neighborhoods and was purchased by the city in 1975. It is now run as an educational farm by the School District of Philadelphia.

The farm was added to the National Register of Historic Places in 2005 under its old name of Stanley, a name it acquired when William Penn granted the land to Lord Stanley.

== Gallery ==
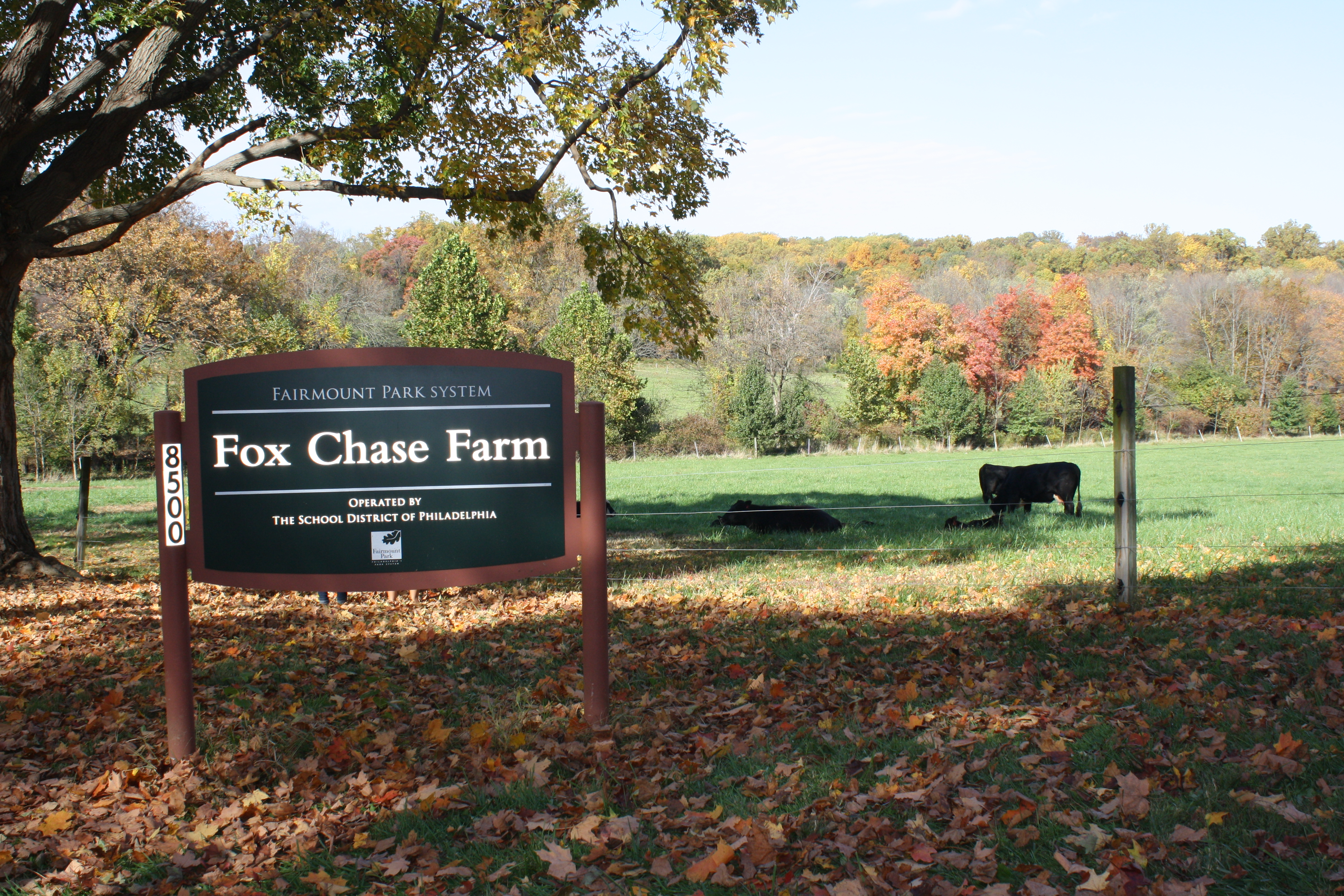
Farm entrance

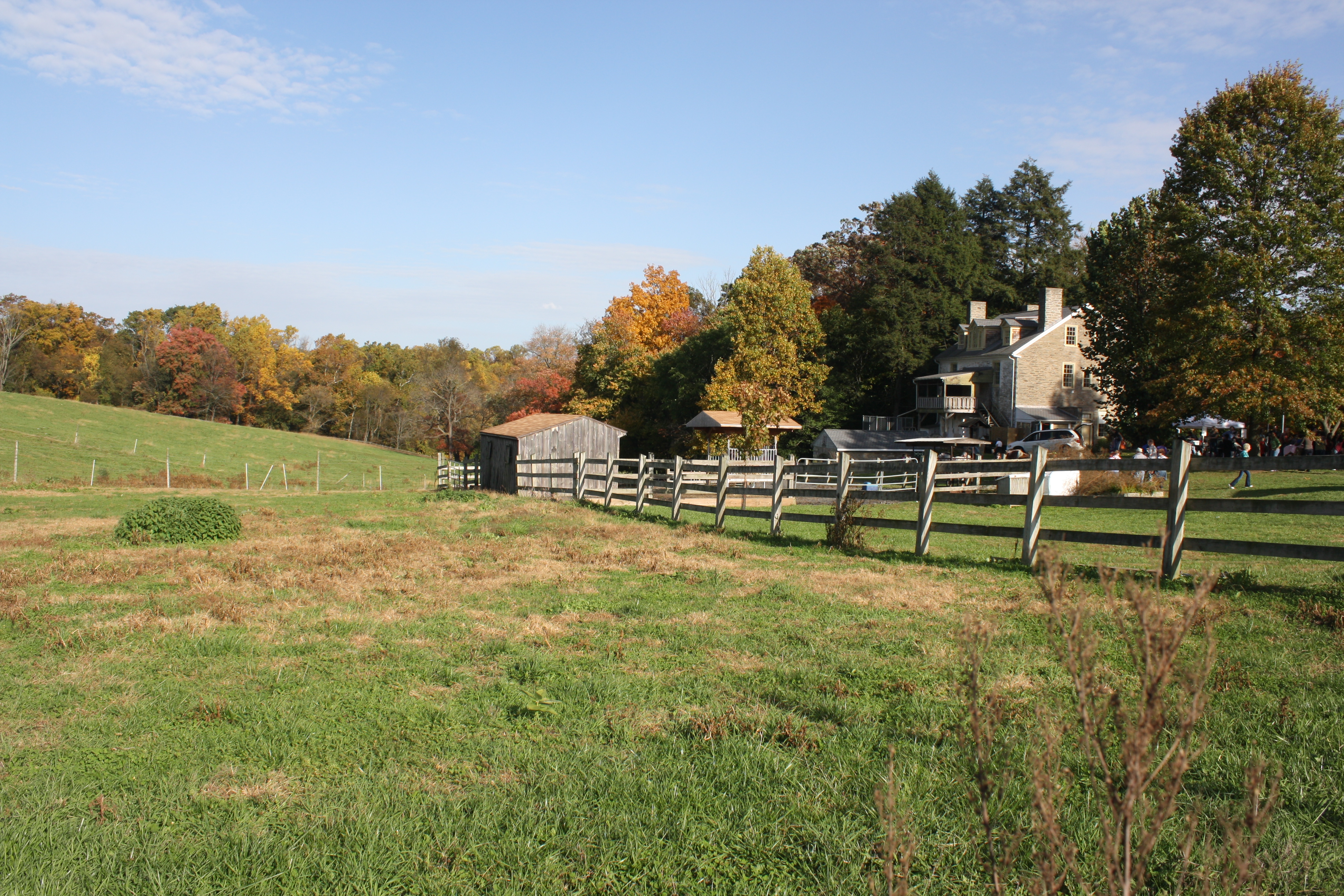
General view of manor house

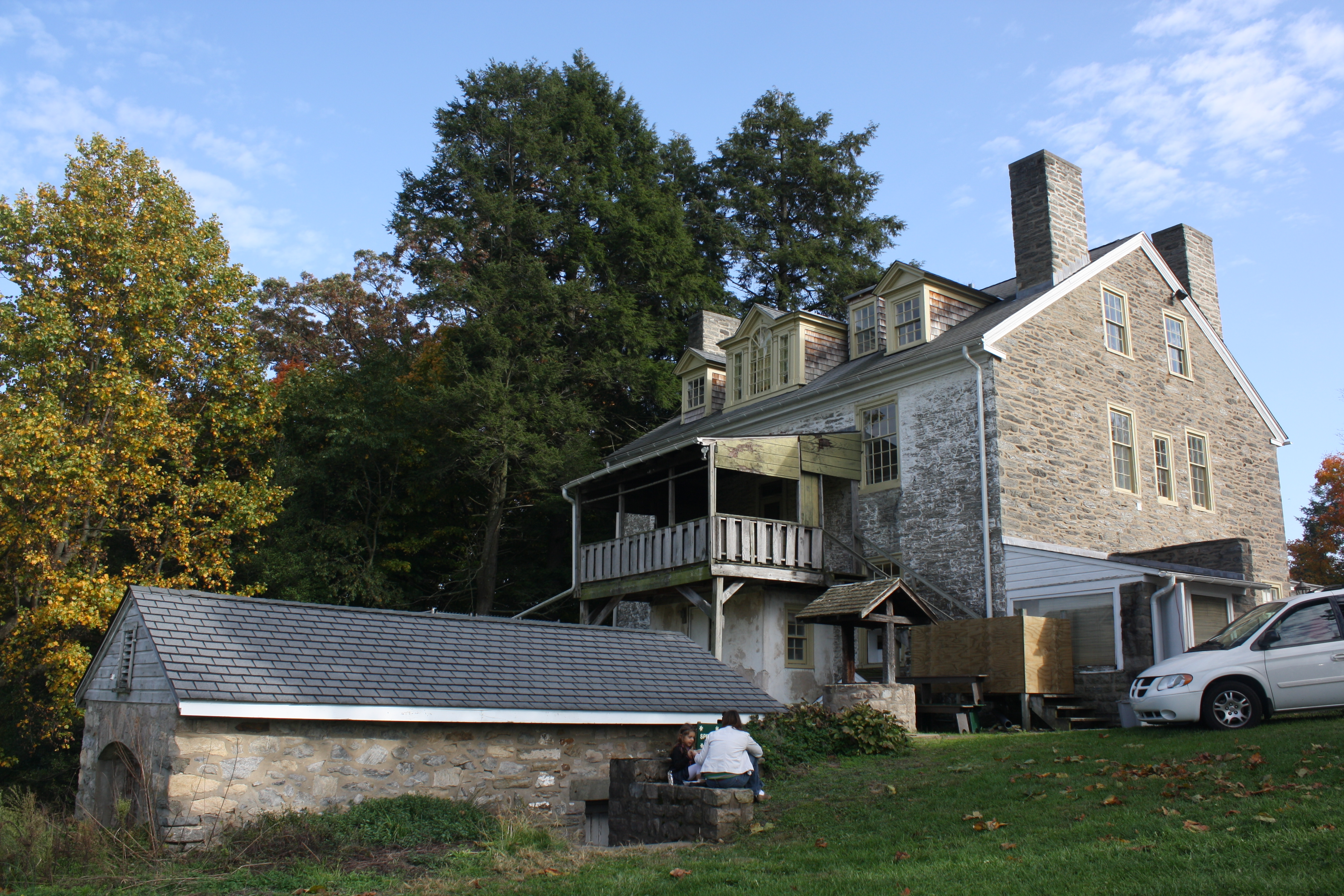
Manor house and spring house

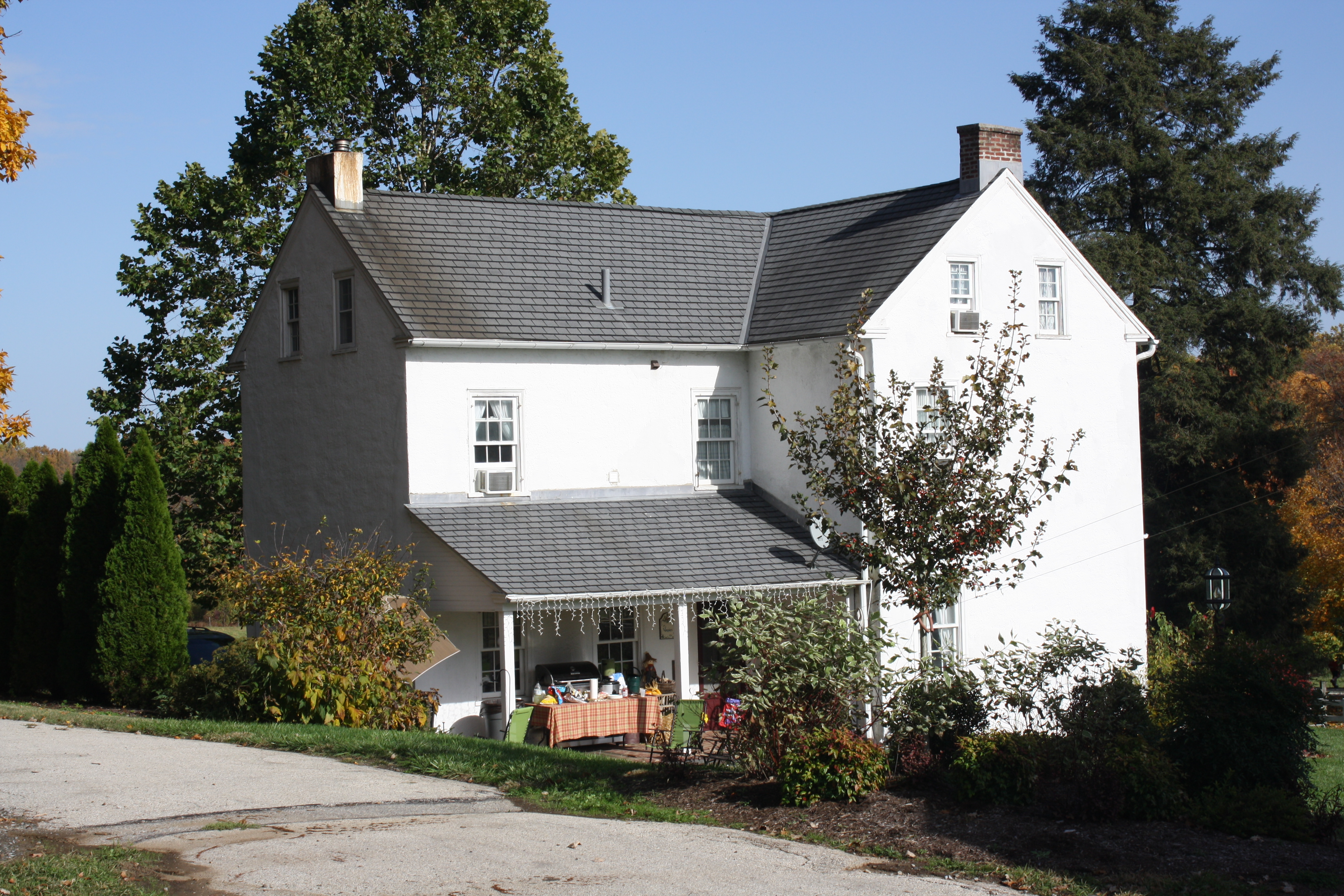
Tenant house

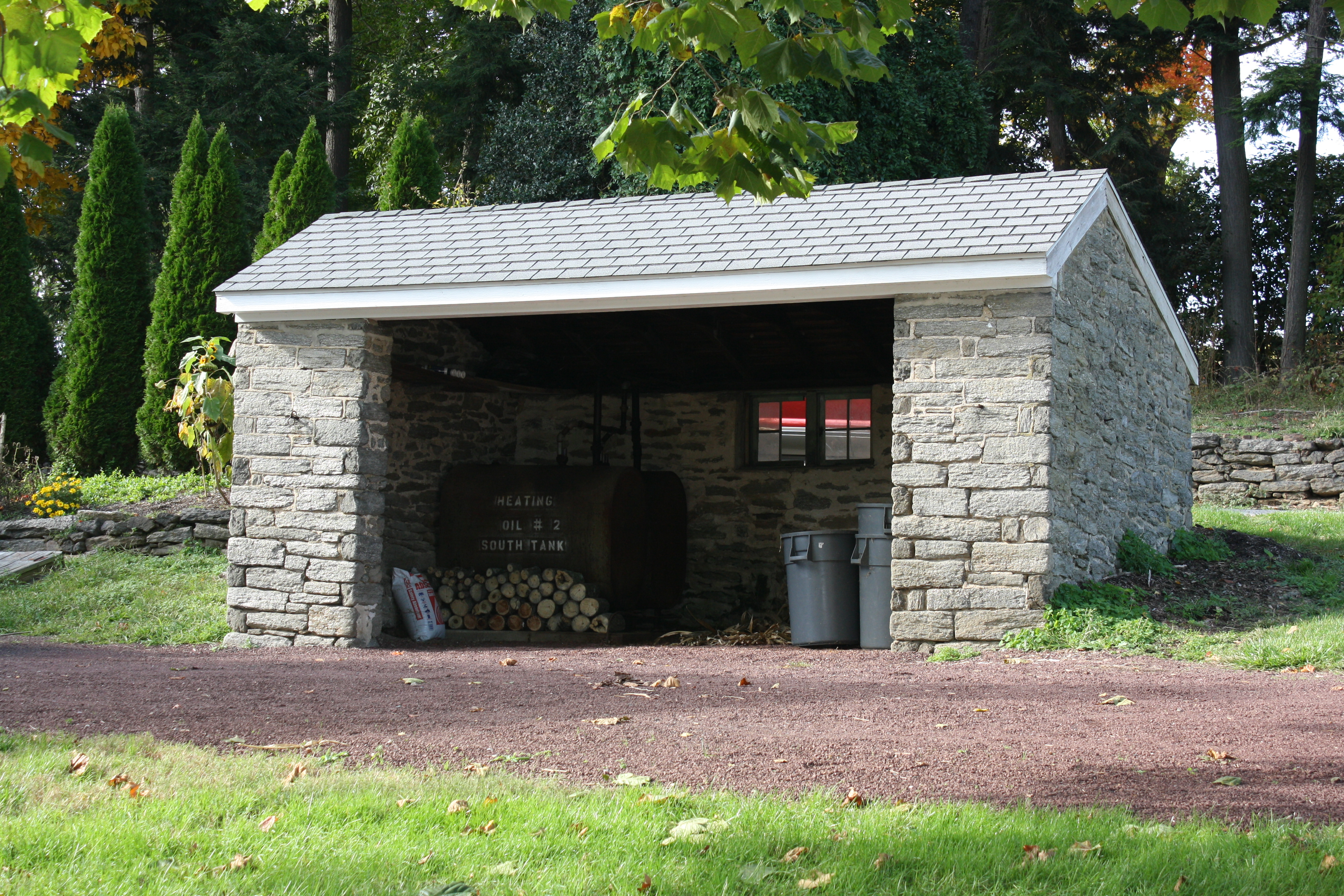
Stone shed

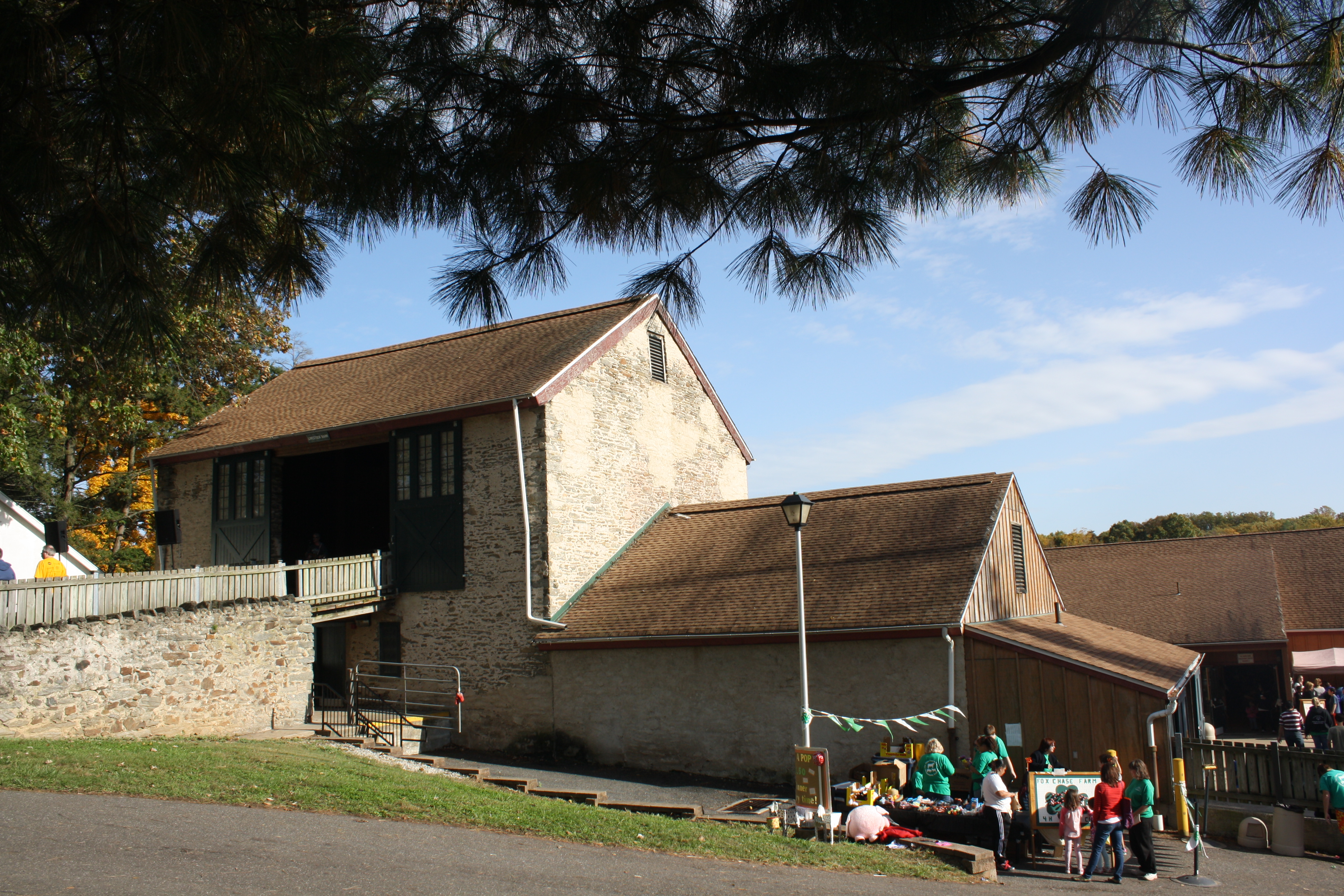
Bank barn

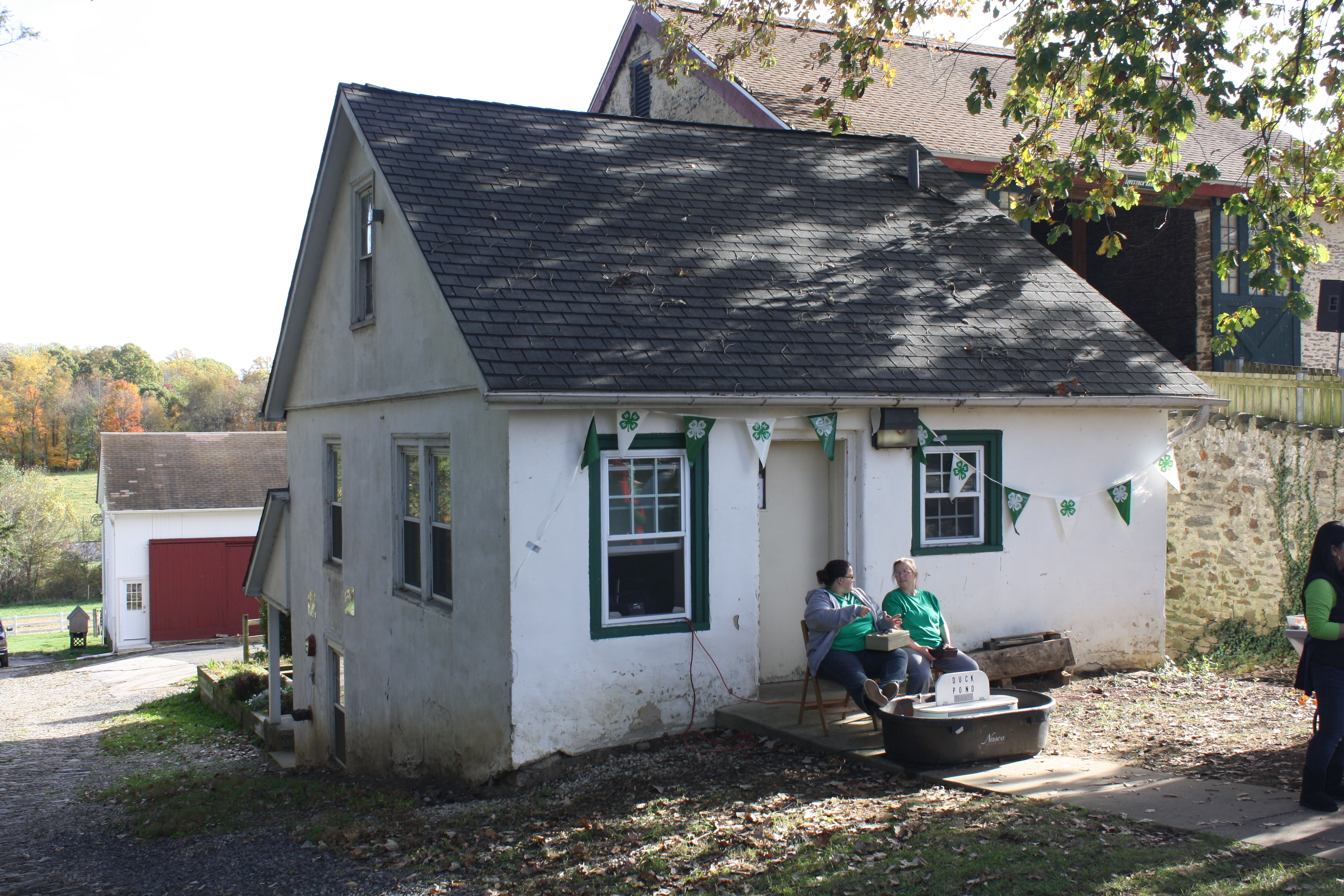
Milk storage house

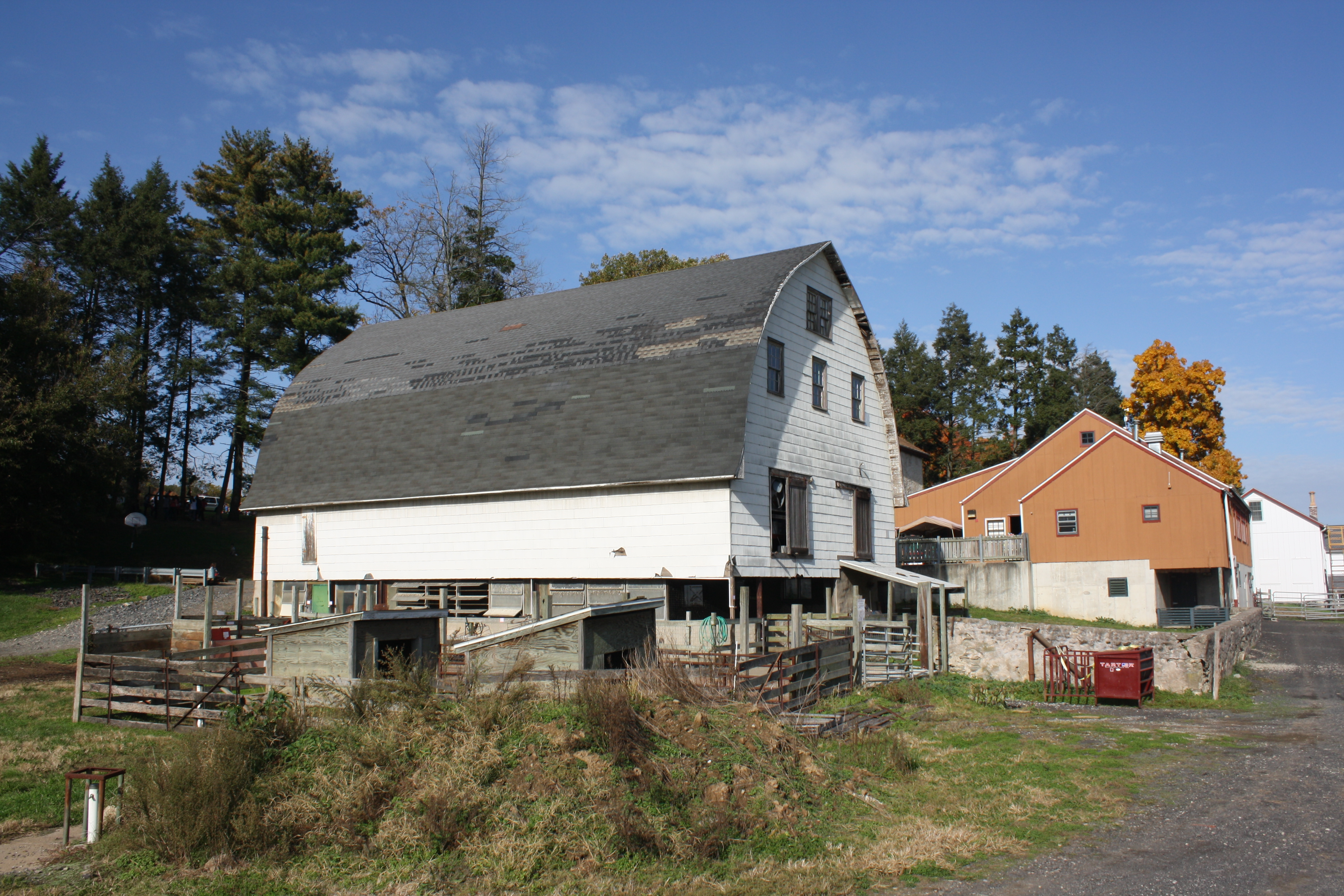
Pig barn and educational center

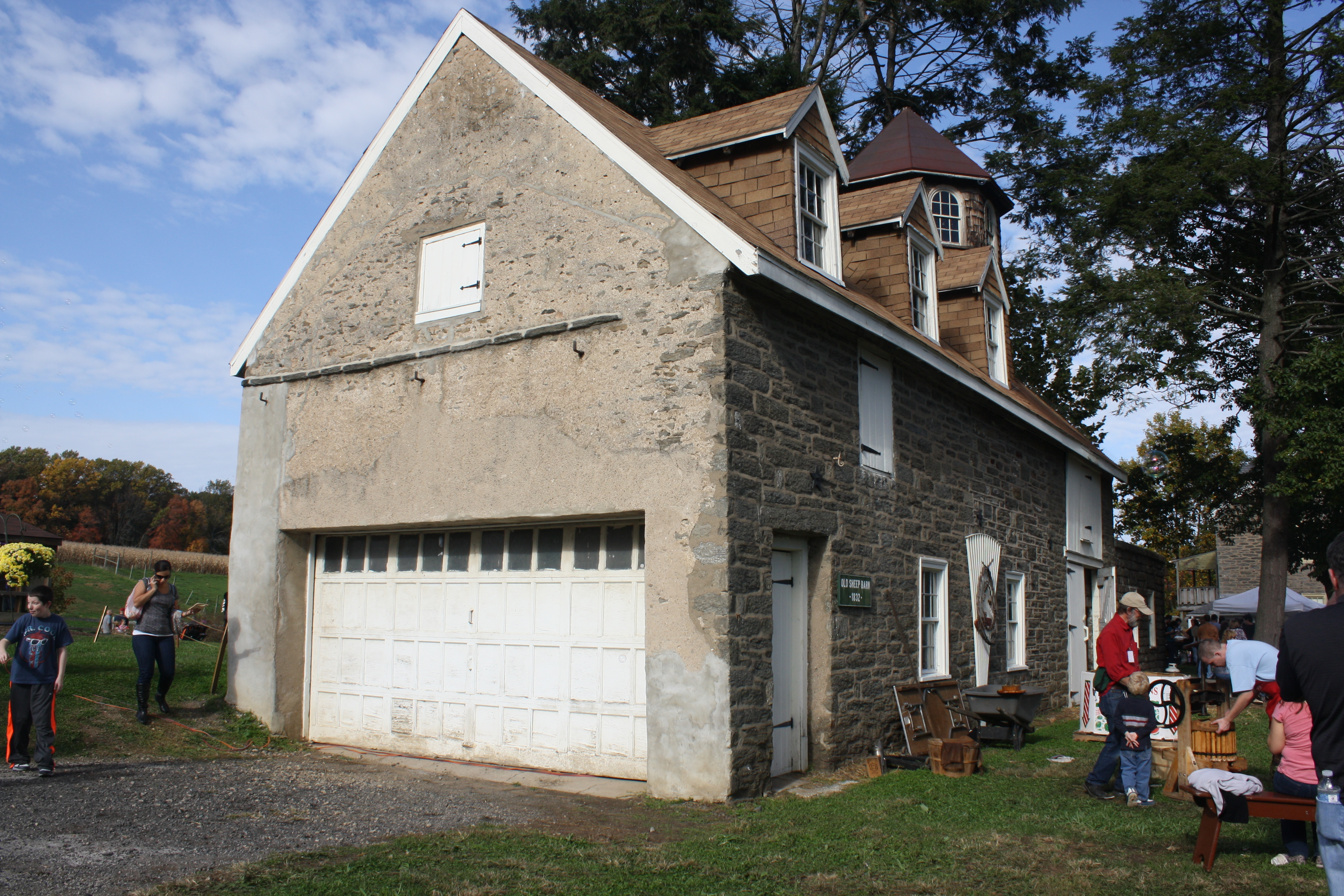
Old sheep barn

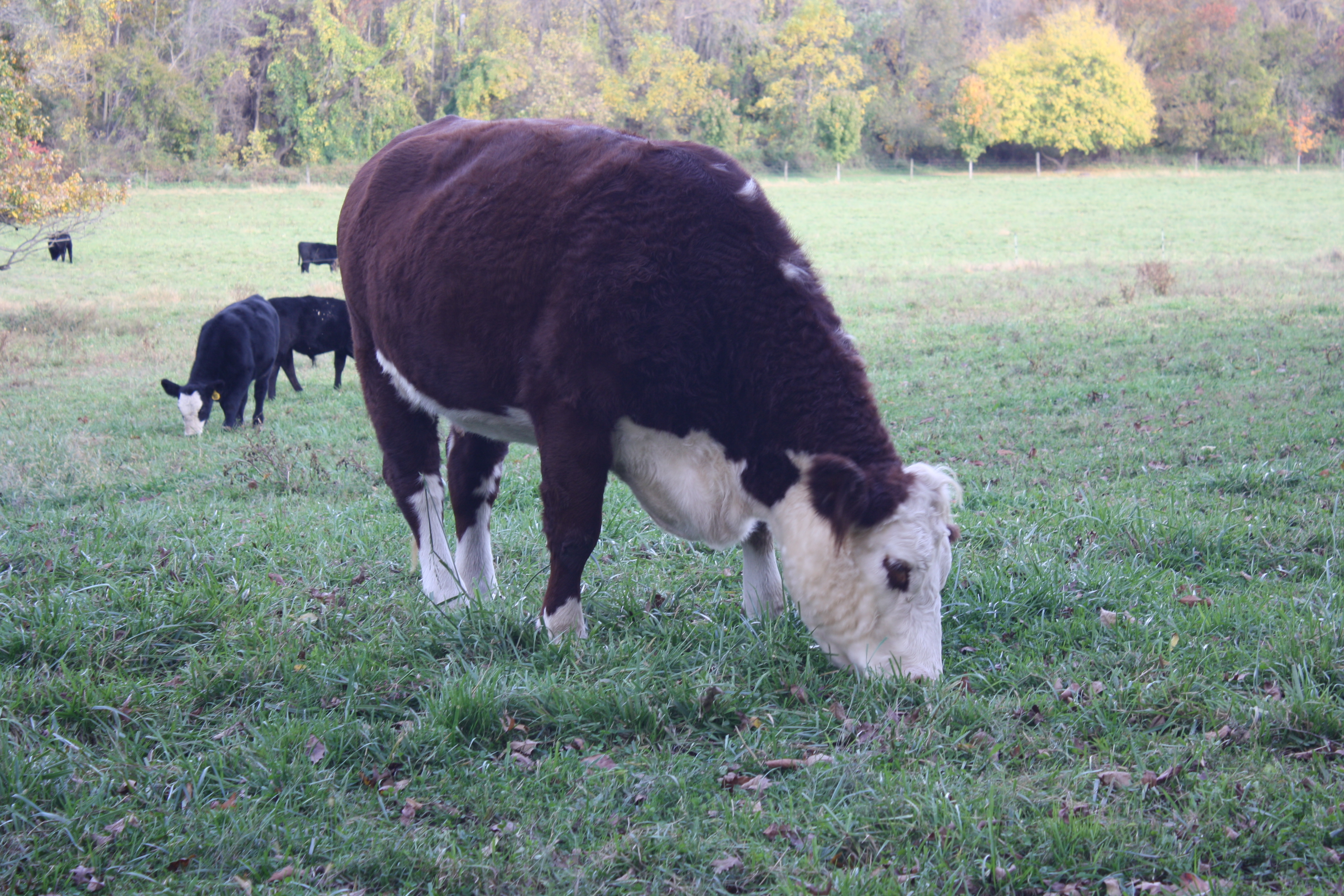
Farm pasture
