= Ryerss Mansion =

Historic house in Pennsylvania, United States

- U.S. National Register of Historic Places
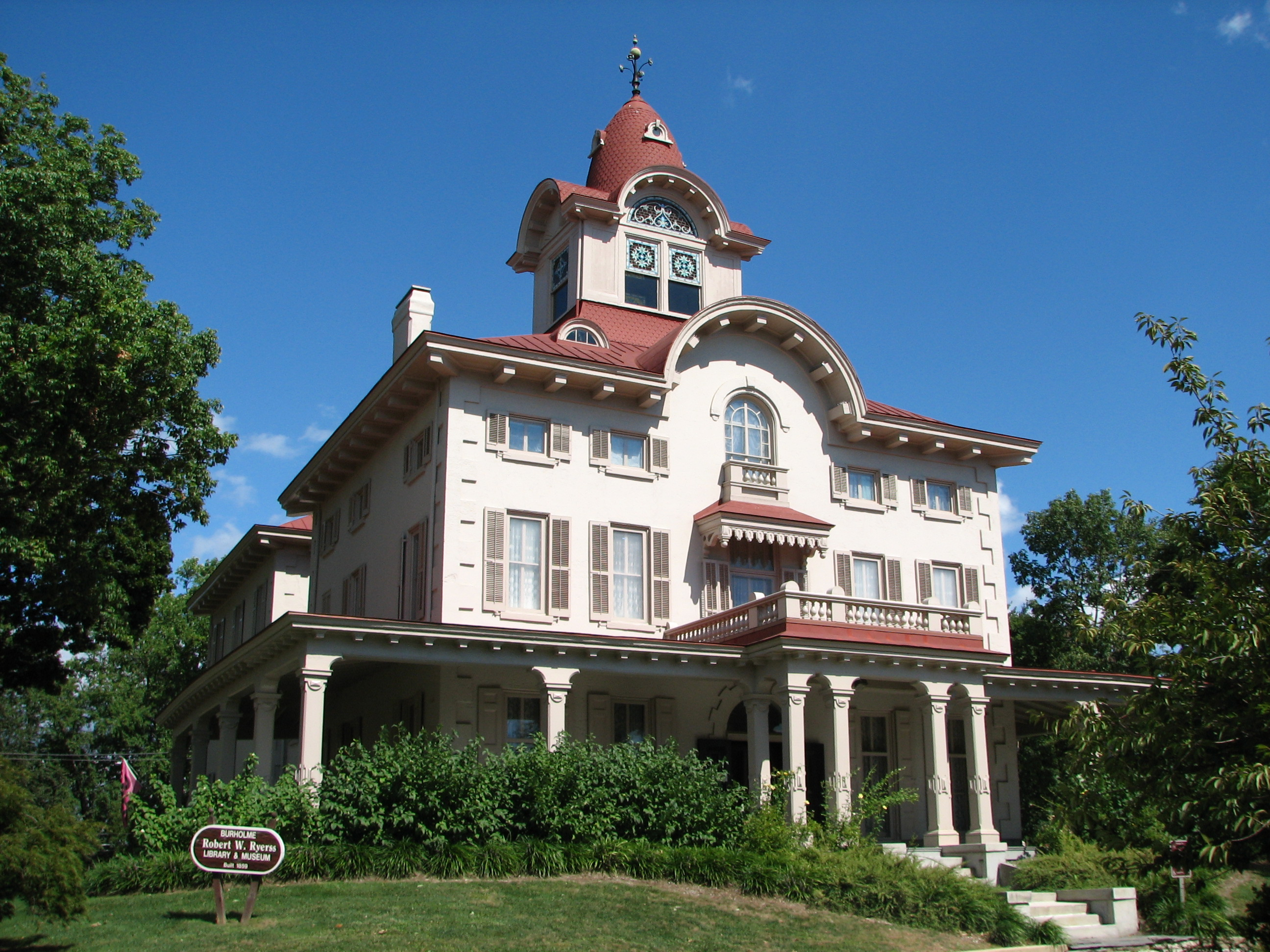

- Location within Philadelphia Location within Pennsylvania Location within the United States
- Location: Central and Cottman Aves. Philadelphia, Pennsylvania
- Coordinates: 40°4′6″N 75°5′20″W
- Built: 1859
- Architectural style: Italianate
- NRHP reference No.: 76001669
- Added to NRHP: November 21, 1976

The Ryerss Mansion, also known as the Burholme Mansion, is a historic American mansion in the Fox Chase neighborhood of Philadelphia, Pennsylvania.

The mansion was listed on the National Register of Historic Places in 1976.

== History and architectural features ==
This house was built on eighty-five acres by merchant Joseph Waln Ryerss in 1859, overlooking Burholme Park, one of the highest vistas in Philadelphia. Ryerss was president of the Tioga Railroad and followed the family business of trading with China, Japan, and England. He also followed the family avocation of collecting art, especially oriental art.

Ryerss died in 1868 leaving the house to his second wife Anne; following her death, ownership of the house passed to his son Robert, who traveled and collected art which he displayed in the house. Less than a year before he died at the age of sixty-five, Robert Ryerss married his longtime housekeeper, Mary Ann Reed, who inherited a comfortable annuity and the house when he died. She remarried three years later to the Reverend John G. Bawn and they continued the family avocations of traveling and art collecting. In 1905, she turned the house over to the city and it opened as a park, museum, and library in 1910 "Free to the people forever" under the administration of the Fairmount Park Commission. Mrs. Ryerss Bawn died in 1916 in China.

The Reverend Bawn then returned to Philadelphia and lobbied the city to build more galleries to house a larger collection. Those galleries were built in 1923.
