= Burholme Park =

Park in Pennsylvania, United States

Coordinates: 40.068°N 75.091°W

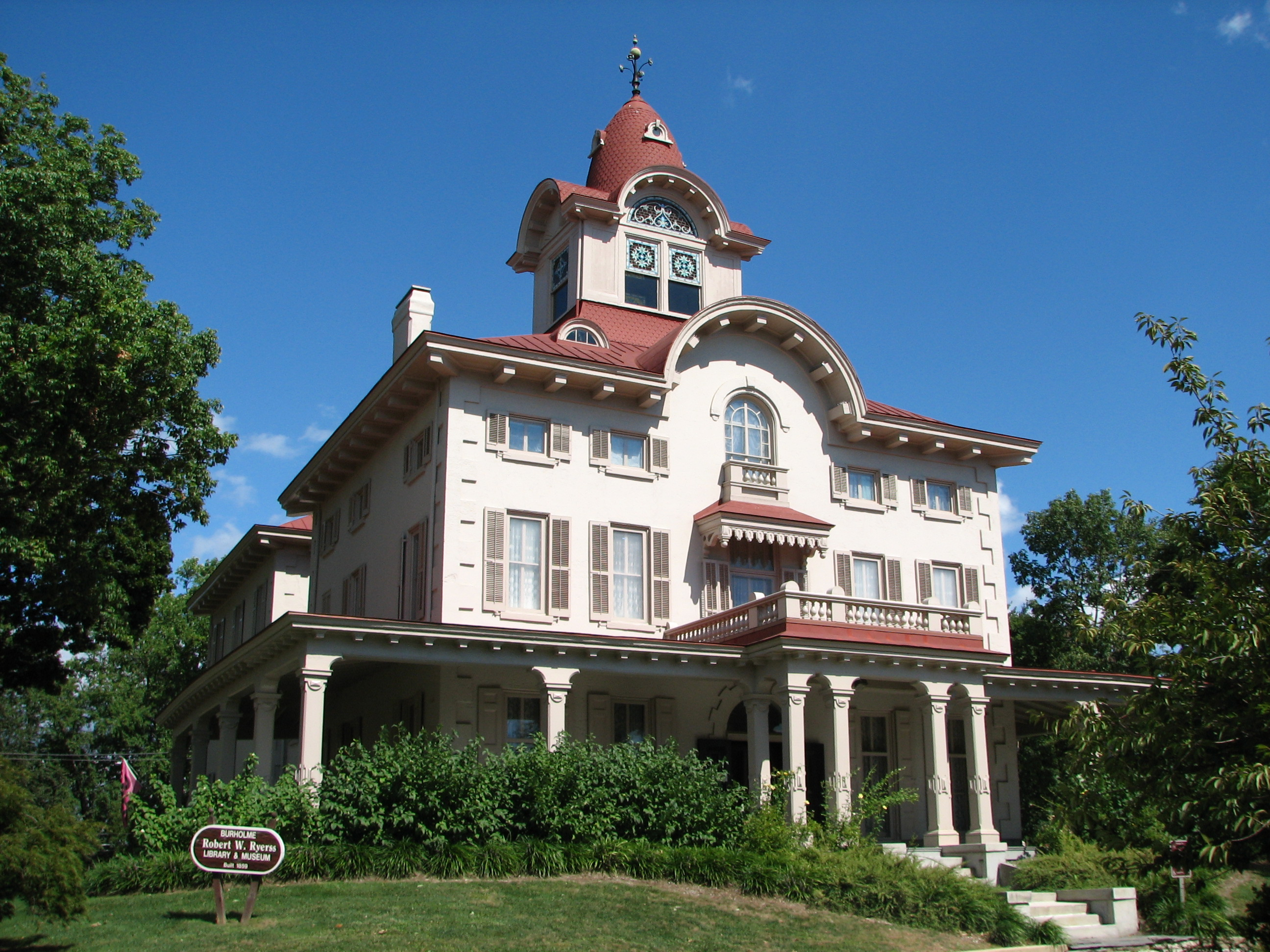
The Burholme estate

Burholme Park is a public park in the Burholme neighborhood of Philadelphia. The park and the Robert W. Ryerss Museum and Library was a gift of the last descendant of the Ryerss family, prominent Philadelphians. Robert W. Ryerss died on Feb. 18, 1895 at age 65, leaving his estate to Mary Reed, his wife of eight months and the head housekeeper of the Ryerss Mansion for 27 years. He left everything to her on the condition that upon her death the best part of his land and much of his estate would be left to the “People of Philadelphia, forever” as a museum and public lending library. Mary Reed Ryerss spent the rest of her life traveling around the world collecting objects for the museum and planning for the library and park.

== History of the estate ==
The Ryerss Mansion was built in 1859 by Joseph Waln Ryerss, a wealthy importer of goods from Asia and president of the Tioga Railroad, to be the family's summer home. The Waln family, who intermarried frequently with the Ryerss family, were descendants of Nicholas Waln, who sailed on the Lamb in 1682, the same year as William Penn. The Waln and Ryerss families were among Philadelphia's social elite.

== The Ryerss family ==
The Ryerss family were philanthropists and early animal rights activists. Robert's stepmother, Anne Ryerss, would care for elderly and sick work horses on the Burholme estate. When she died in 1888, she left $30,000 to care for "aged and infirmed" horses and an additional $40,000 to create and maintain a hospital. Robert W. Ryerss bought an 80-acre (0.13 sq mi) farm in Bustleton and became the first president of the Ryerss Farm for Aged Equines until he retired in September 1894. The facility was among the first in the United States to protect horses and large animals. Today the Ryerss Farm for Aged Equines still exists in Pottstown, Pennsylvania.

Robert W. Ryerss was instrumental in helping create the Pennsylvania Society for the Prevention of Cruelty of Animals and the Anti-Vivisectionist Society of Pennsylvania. Visitors to the museum can see the family's pet cemetery and the many portraits the Ryerss commissioned of their pets.

When Joseph W. Ryerss died in 1868 he left the estate to his only son Robert W. Ryerss. Robert was educated at the University of Pennsylvania Law School, but because of the family's wealth, he was able to live a life of leisure, while using much of his inheritance for philanthropic purposes. He traveled around the world and collected objects to display in the home. He was also an avid reader. On his death he left his library of 11,000 books to be used as a public library. The Ryerss Public Library was one of the first public libraries in the city. On May 14, 1910, Burholme Park and the Ryerss Museum and Library opened to the public.

== The Park ==
Burholme Park provides fields for sports organizations. There are three baseball diamonds, a football field, and three soccer fields. The Park also contains a playground and is a popular place for sledding on the park's large hill. The park is situated next to Jeanes Hospital and Fox Chase Cancer Center, as well as a Mini-golf/Driving Range.

Fox Chase Cancer Center announced on January 16, 2010, that it was abandoning its efforts to expand into the park. The center decided not to appeal a Commonwealth Court decision against its plans. In December 2008, Judge John W. Herron ruled that Fox Chase was not entitled to build on 19.4 acres (79,000 m^{2}) of the 65-acre (260,000 m^{2}) park. The hospital had appealed that decision to Commonwealth Court.

== The Woods at Burholme ==
One of the more noteworthy features of Burholme Park is its beautiful wooded areas, holding the park true to its name, which means "house in a woodland setting." These woods also serve as a haven for underage drinking, which is heavily targeted by city (not) suburban police.

== See also ==
- List of parks in Philadelphia
