= Hunting Park station =

Rapid transit station in Philadelphia

Hunting Park
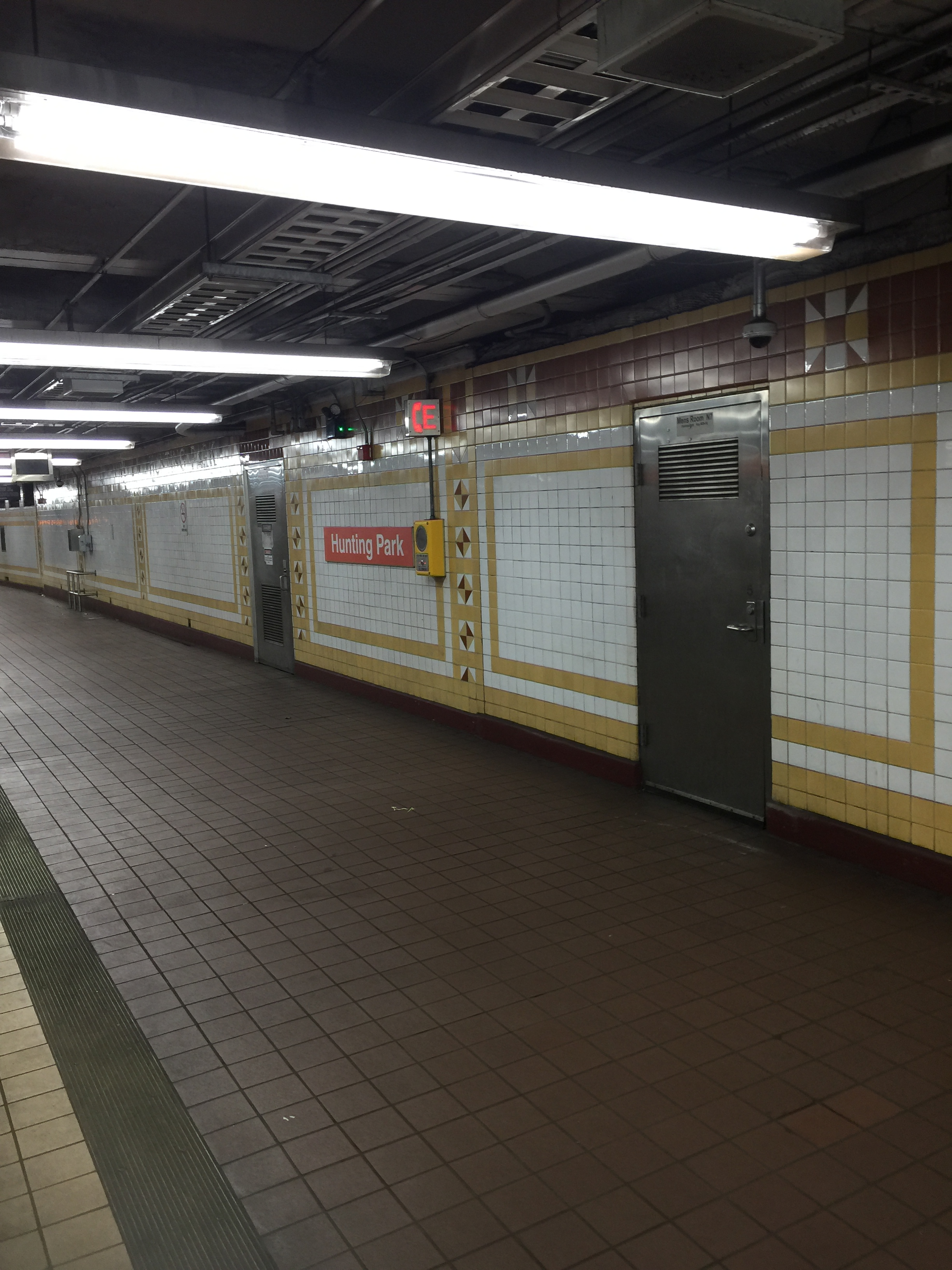
- Hunting Park station platform

General information
- Location: 4200 North Broad Street; Philadelphia, Pennsylvania
- Coordinates: 40.0169°N 75.1495°W
- Owner: City of Philadelphia
- Operator: SEPTA
- Platforms: 2 side platforms
- Tracks: 4
- Connections: SEPTA City Bus: 1, 16, 82

Construction
- Structure type: Underground
- Accessible: No, accessibility planned

History
- Opened: September 1, 1928

Services
Preceding station	SEPTA Metro	Following station
Erie toward NRG Station	B (SEPTA Metro)	Wyoming toward Fern Rock T.C.
and do not stop here
Location

Hunting Park station is a SEPTA Metro stop in Philadelphia. Served by the B1, it is located at 4200 North Broad Street at Hunting Park Avenue in the Hunting Park section of North Philadelphia, Pennsylvania. This is a local station, and thus has four tracks, with only the outer two being served. There are separate fare control areas for the northbound and southbound platforms, and no crossover exists.

Hunting Park station is located east of Marcus Foster Memorial Stadium, and south and east of US 13.

Hunting Park station was updated to have the new SEPTA Metro signage, but it is unknown when this was made. This makes Hunting Park the second Broad Street Line station to receive SEPTA Metro branding and the third on the entire network behind Drexel Station at 30th Street and Wyoming. (Image will be added soon)

After Hunting Park the proposed Roosevelt Boulevard Subway, trains would split off from the main tracks (using express tracks like the B3) and head to North 9th or Wyoming 5th to Neshaminy Mall

== Gallery ==
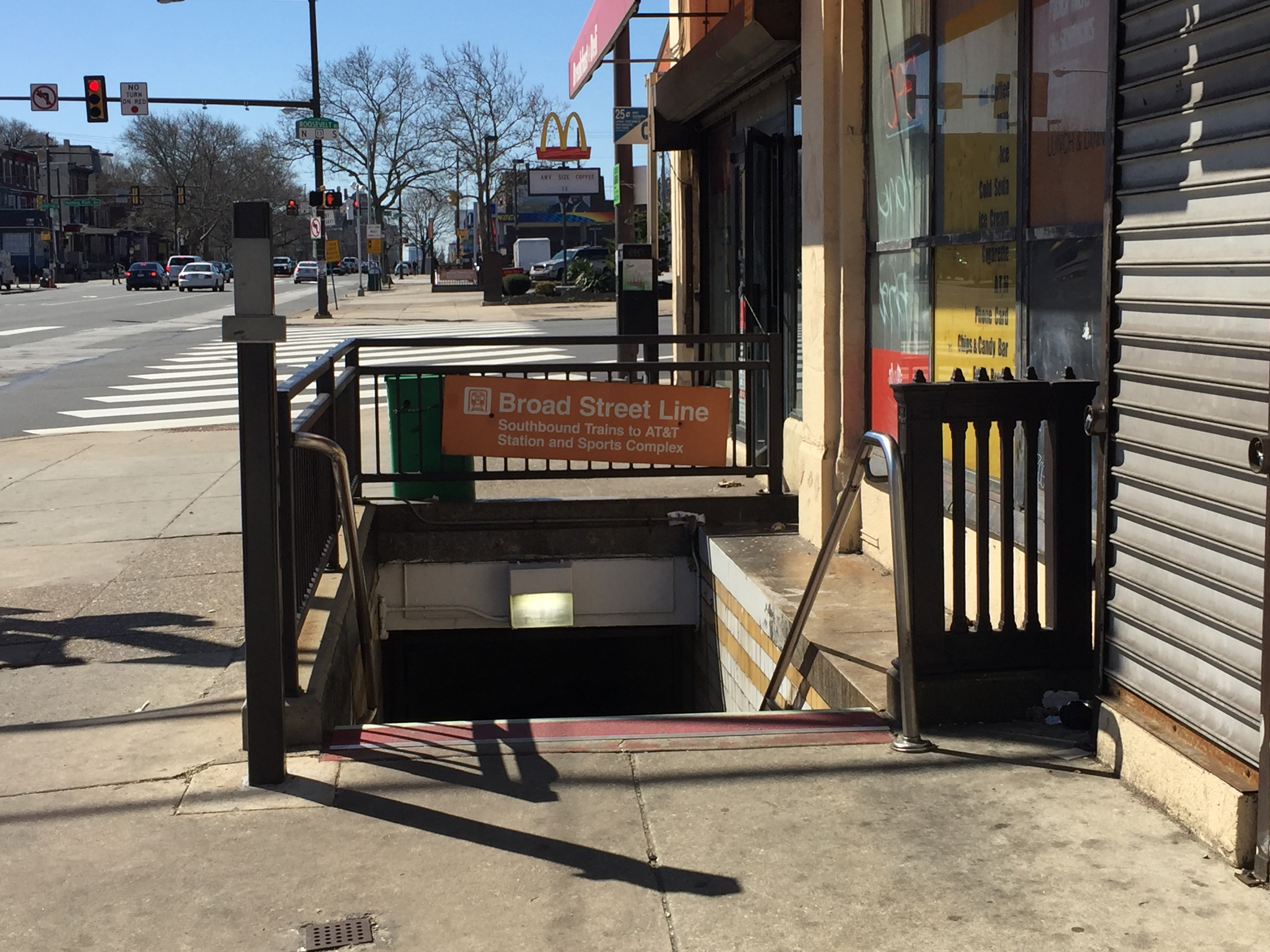
Hunting Park station in 2017

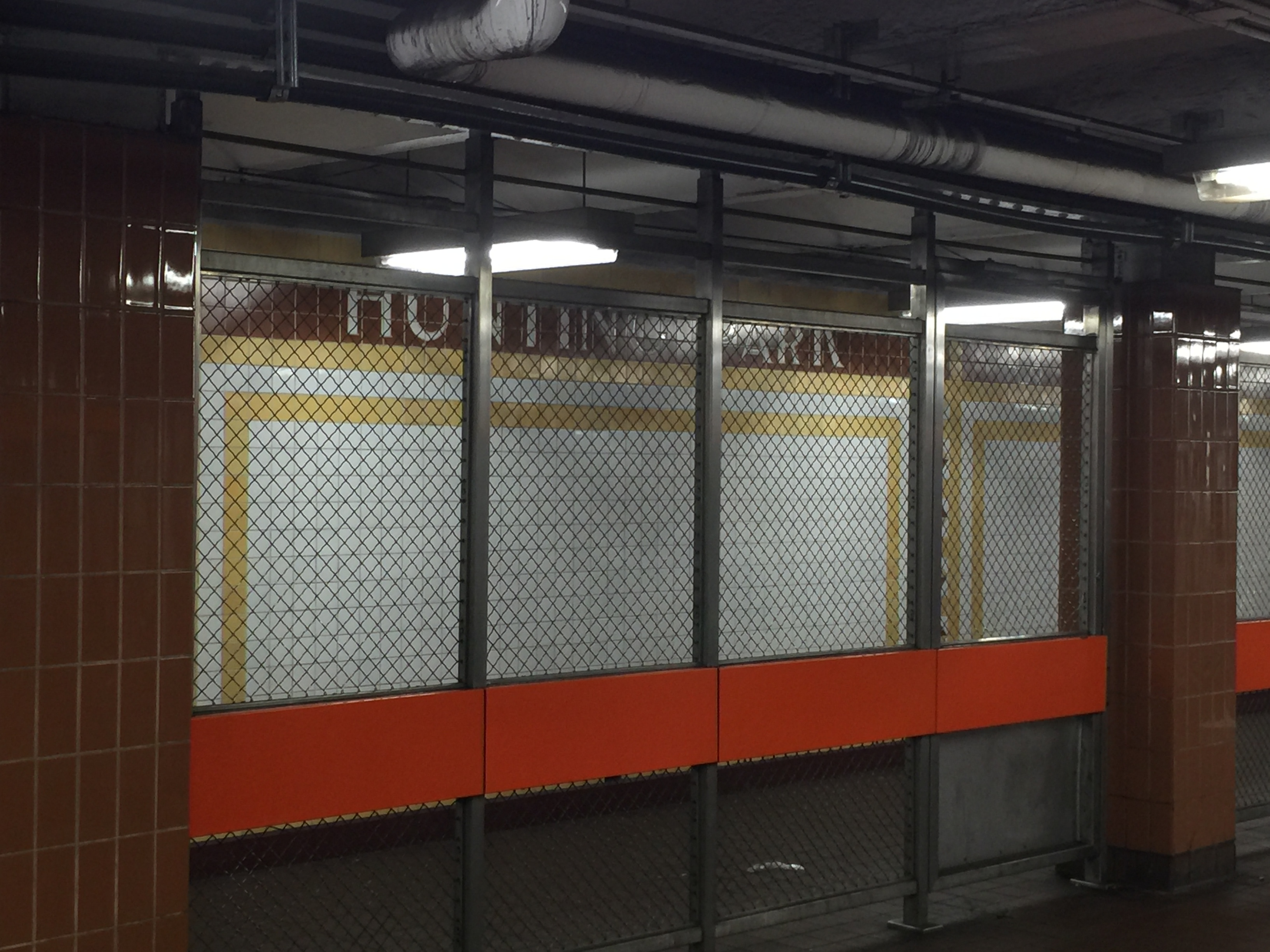
Tile work

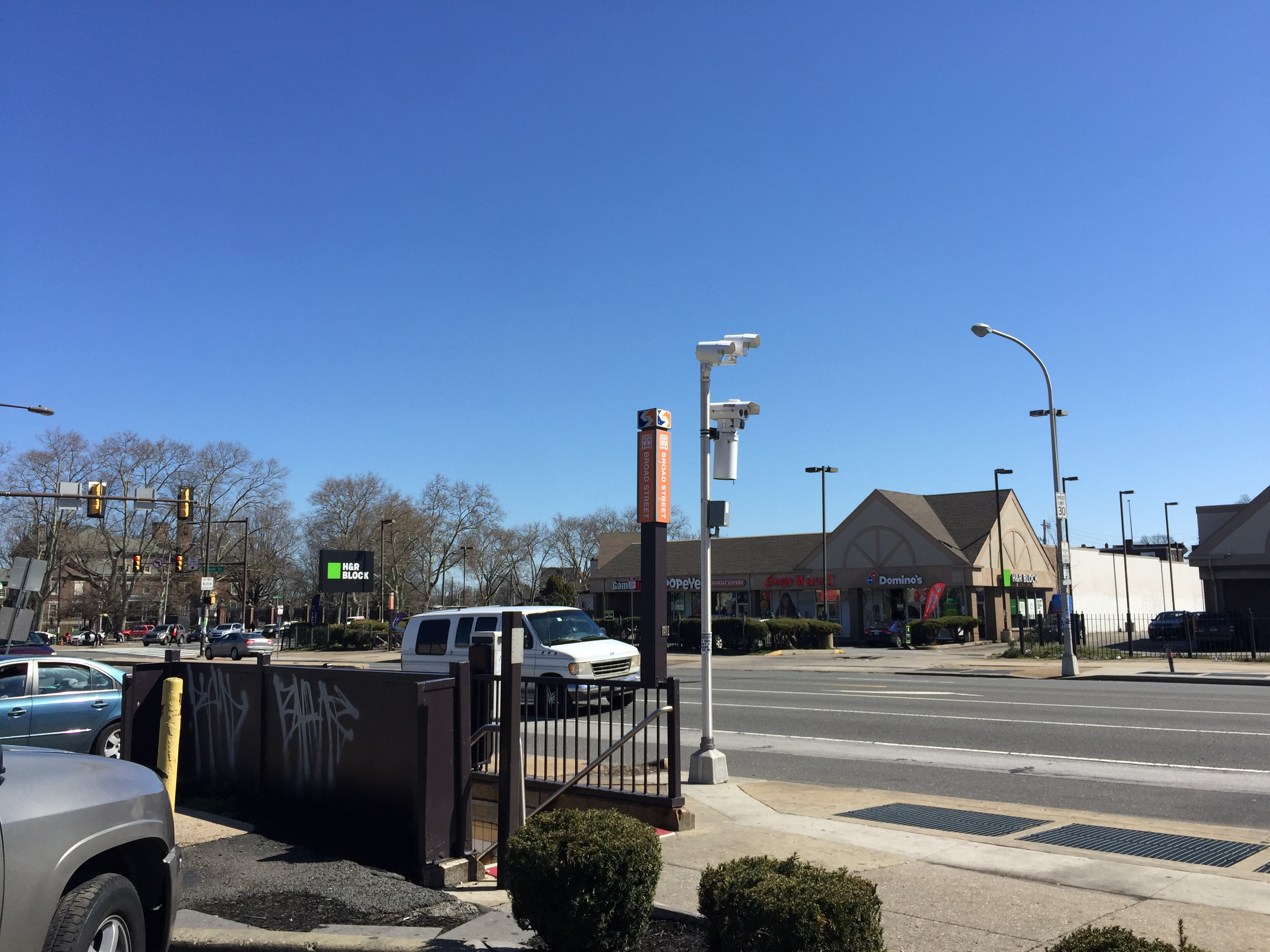
Hunting Park station entrance
