= Wyoming station (SEPTA) =

Rapid transit station in Philadelphia

Wyoming
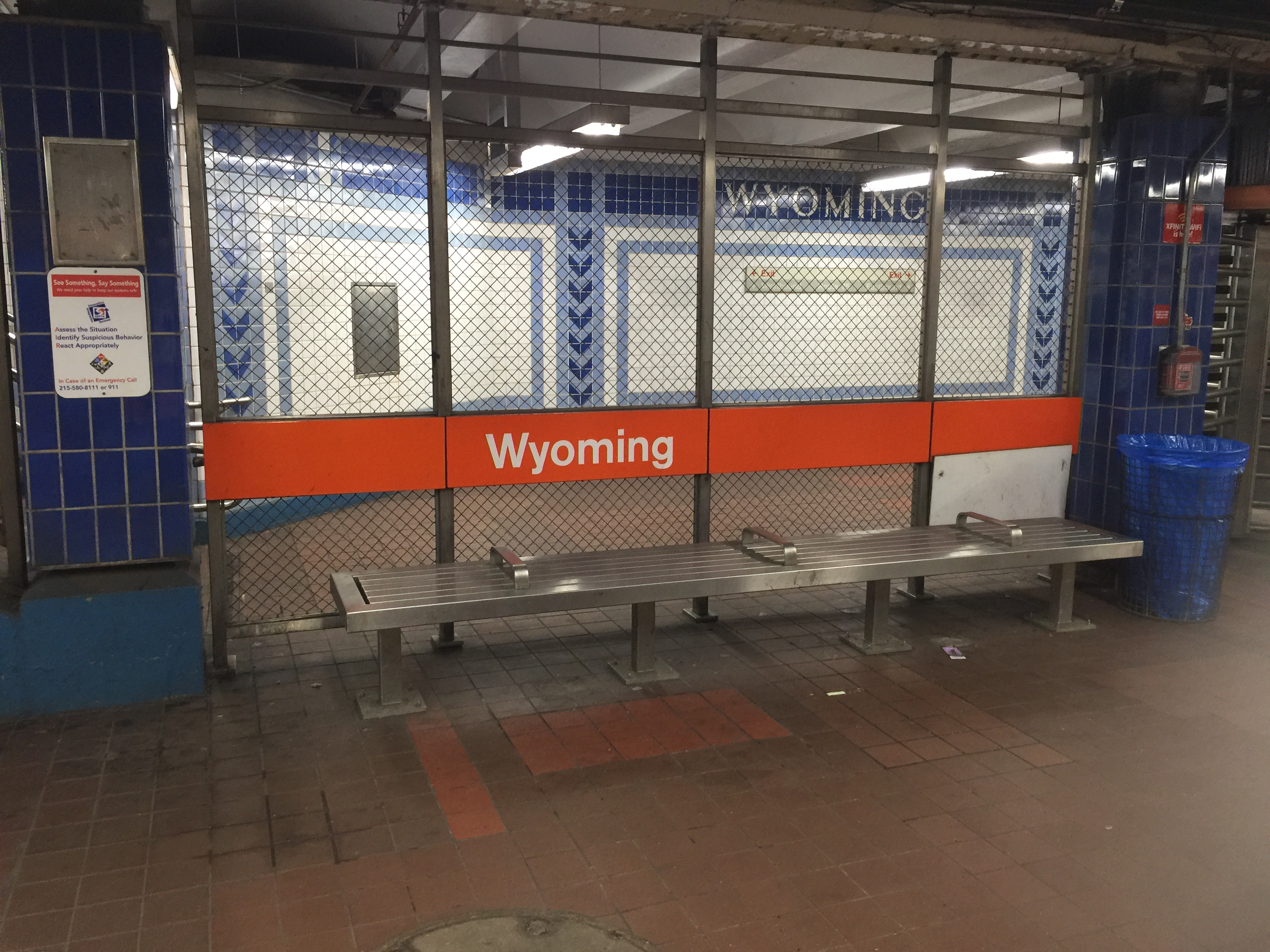
- Wyoming station platform

General information
- Location: 4700 North Broad Street; Philadelphia, Pennsylvania
- Coordinates: 40.0246°N 75.1479°W
- Owner: City of Philadelphia
- Operator: SEPTA
- Platforms: 2 side platforms
- Tracks: 4
- Connections: SEPTA City Bus: 16, 75

Construction
- Structure type: Underground
- Accessible: No, accessibility planned

History
- Opened: September 1, 1928

Services
Preceding station	SEPTA Metro	Following station
Hunting Park toward NRG Station	B (SEPTA Metro)	Logan toward Fern Rock T.C.
and do not stop here
Location

Wyoming station is an underground SEPTA Metro stop in Philadelphia. It serves the B1 and is located in the Logan neighborhood of North Philadelphia at 4700 North Broad Street and Wyoming Avenue. This is a local station, and thus has four tracks, with only the outer two being served. There are separate fare control areas for the northbound and southbound platforms, and no crossover exists. On January 4, 2025, it became the first Broad Street Line station to receive the SEPTA Metro branding.

== Gallery ==
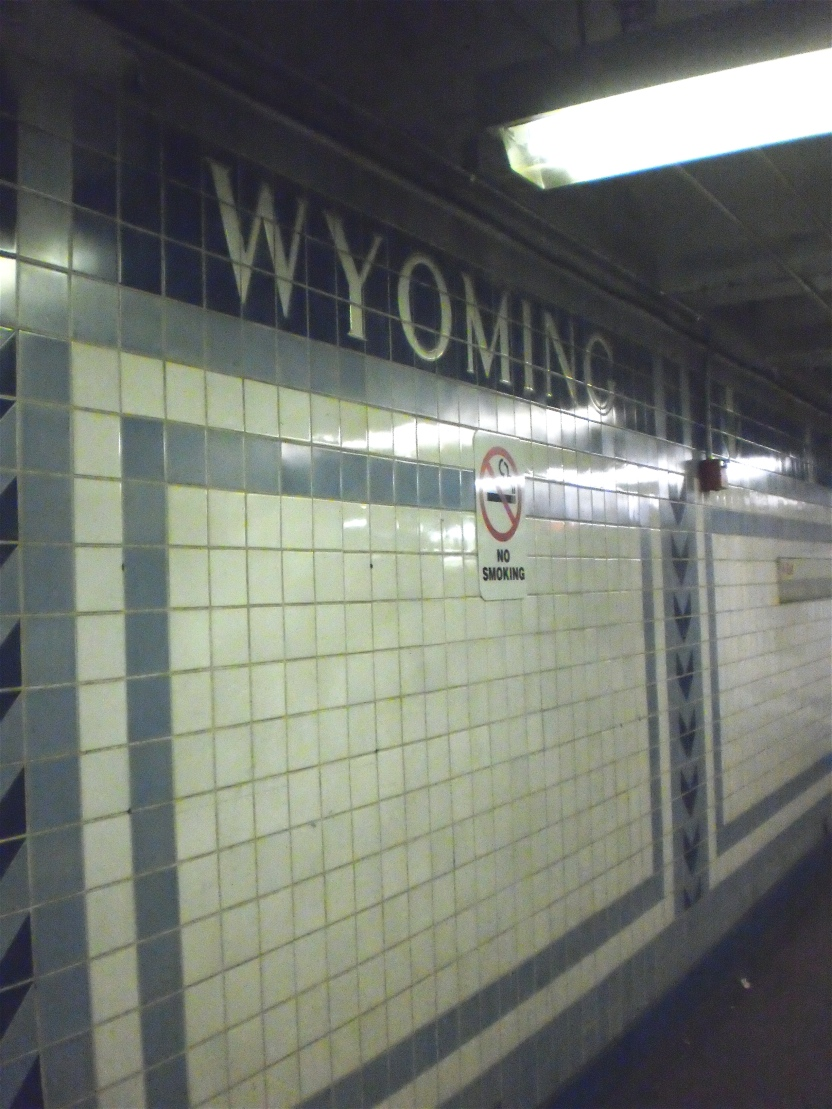
Tiles on wall of Wyoming SEPTA station, August 2010

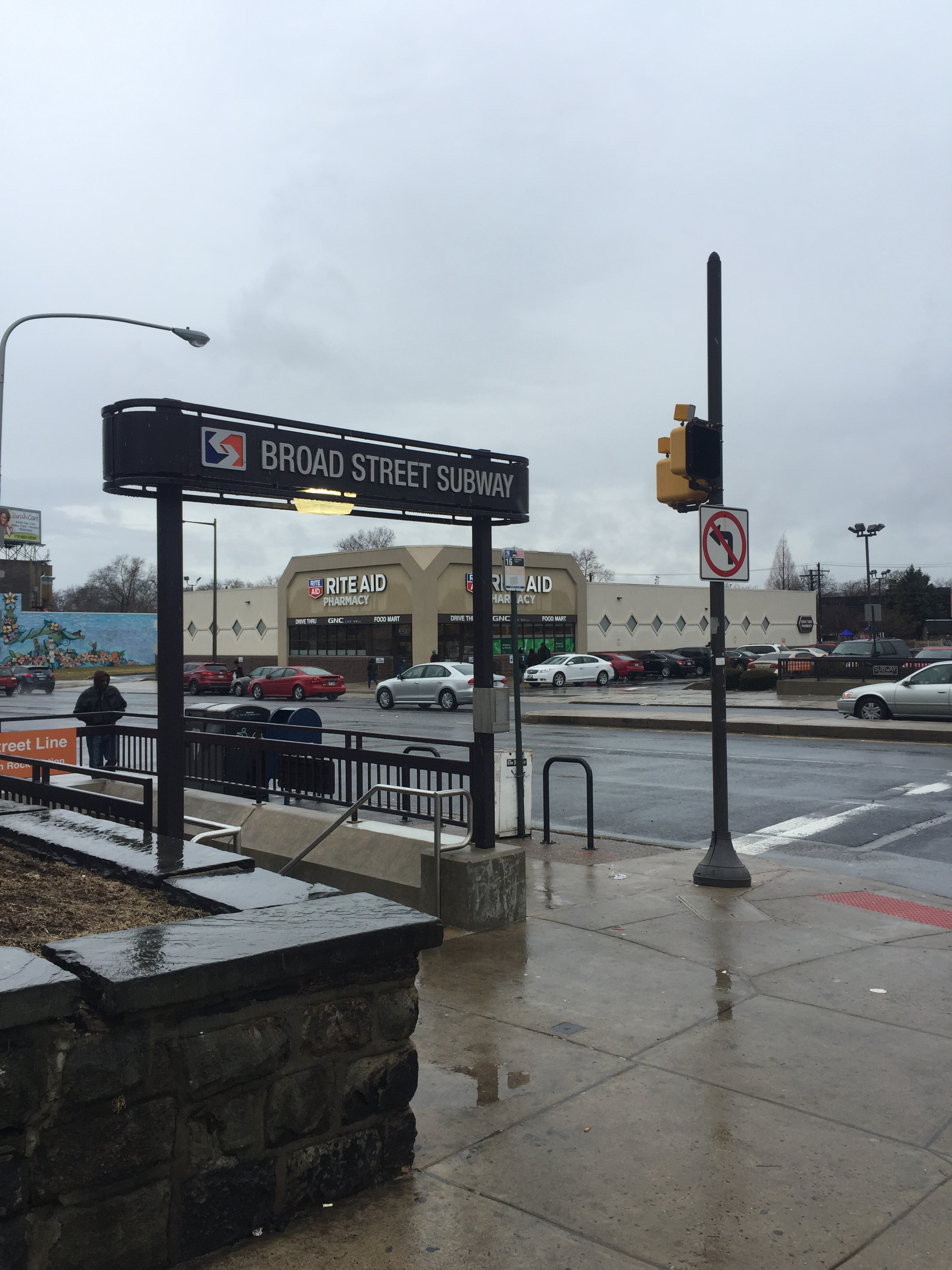
Wyoming station entrance

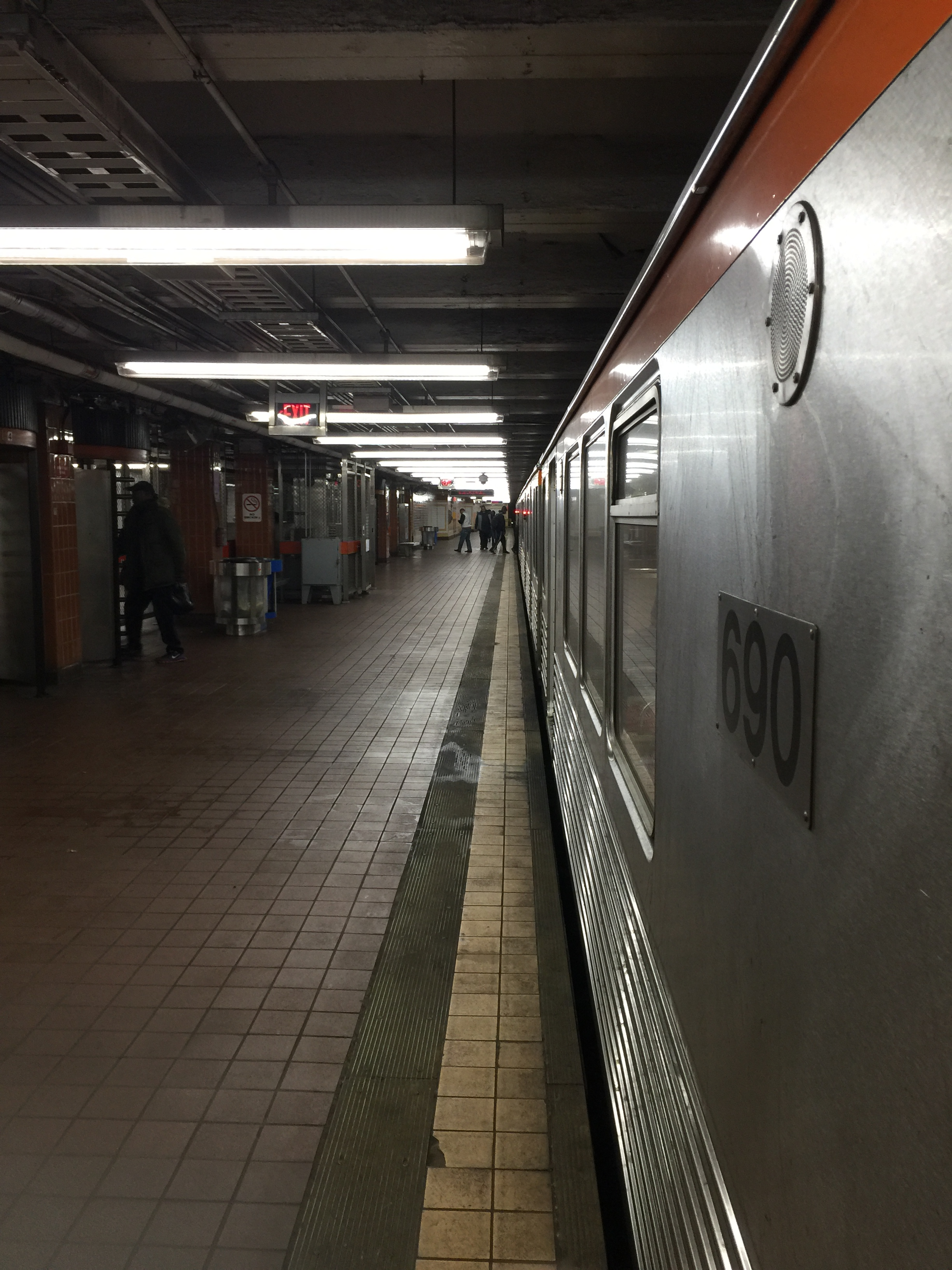
platform

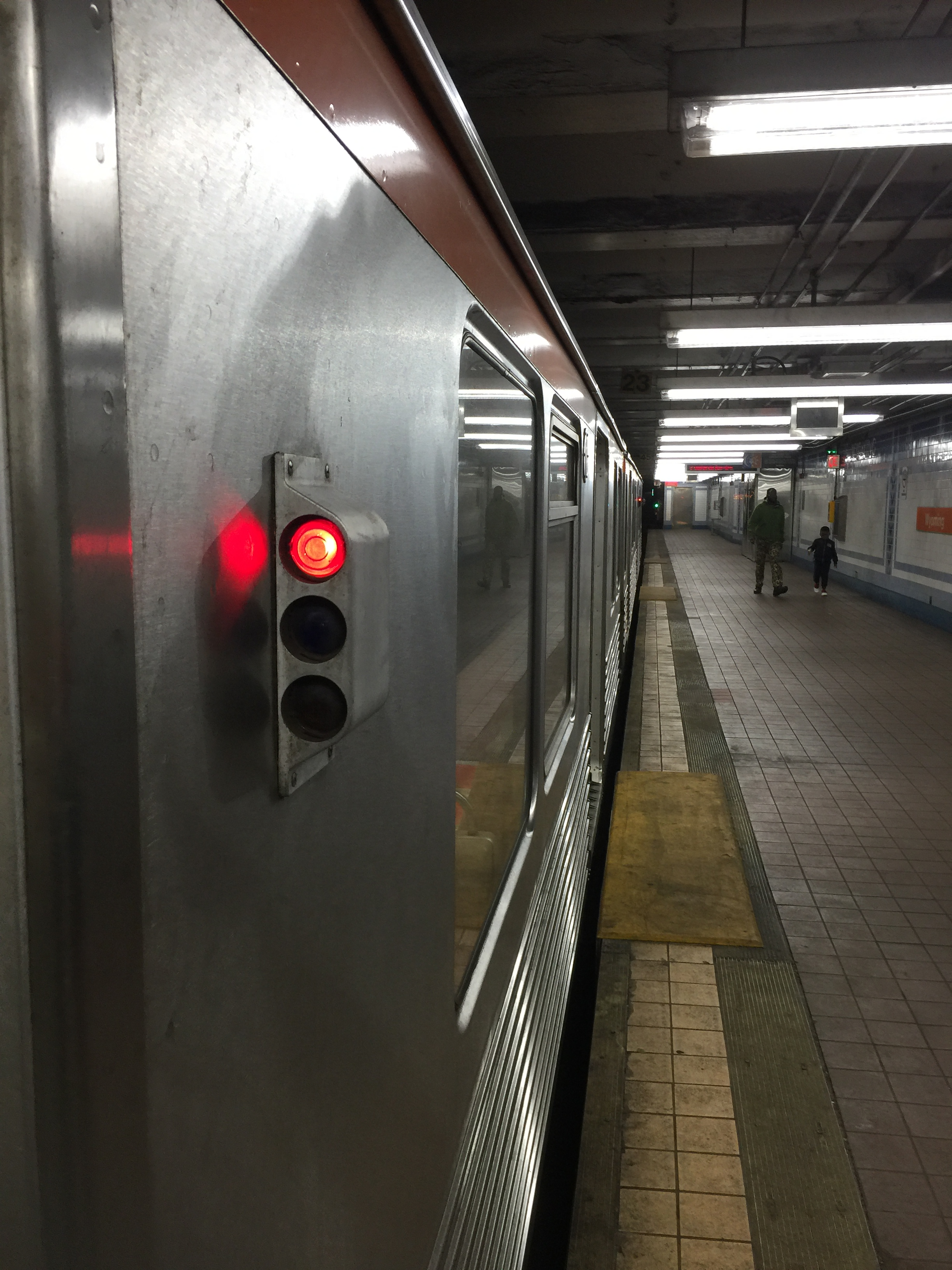
platform
