= Roosevelt Boulevard Subway =

Proposed subway line in Philadelphia, Pennsylvania

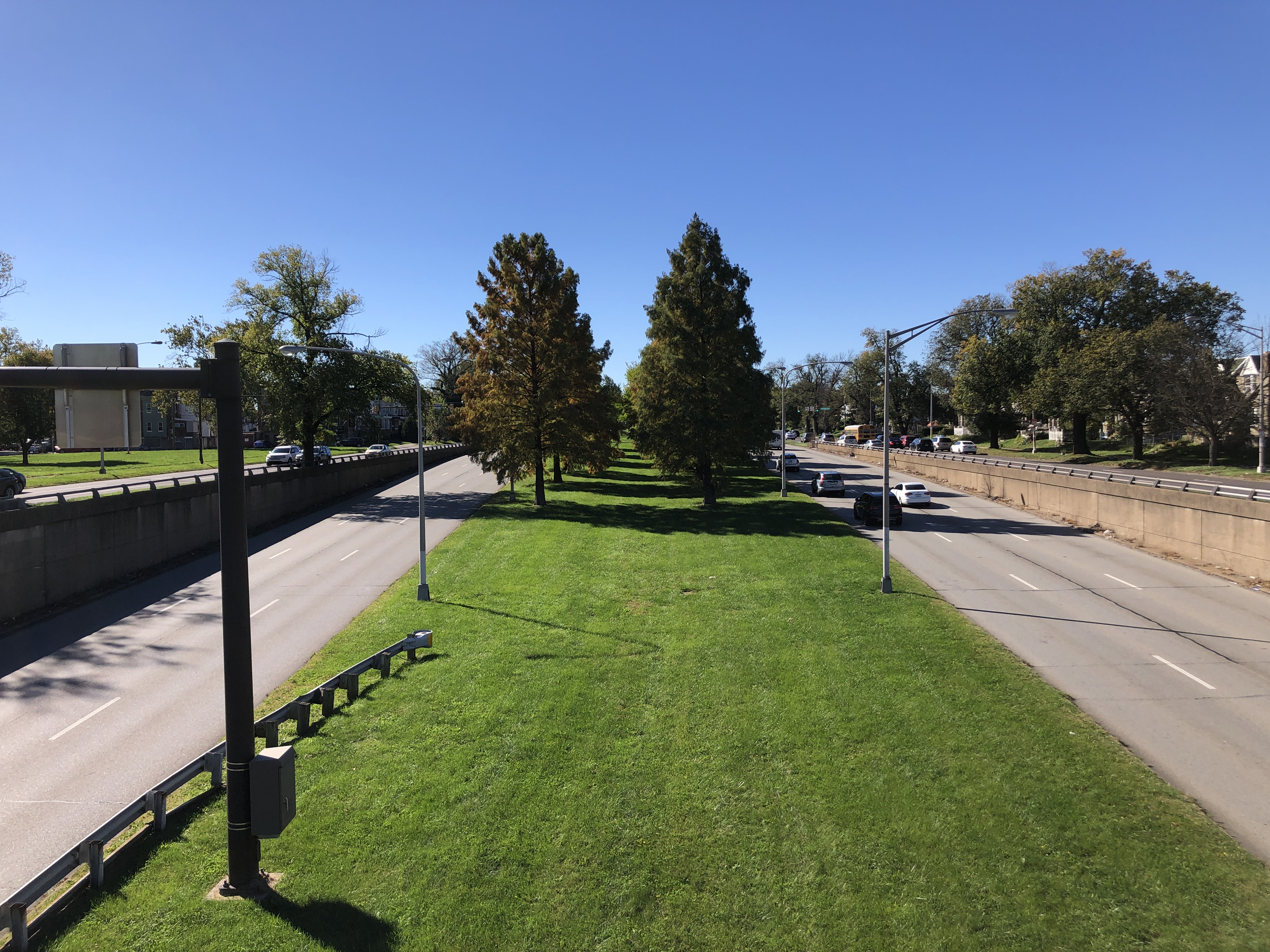
- Roosevelt Boulevard, built with a wide median intended for use by a future transit line

Overview
- Status: Proposed
- Locale: Philadelphia, Pennsylvania, U.S.
- Stations: 13 (proposed)

Service
- Type: Rapid transit
- System: SEPTA Metro
- Operator: SEPTA

Technical
- Character: Underground and surface
- Track gauge: 4 ft 8 1/2 in (1,435 mm) standard gauge
- Electrification: Third rail, 600 V DC

The Roosevelt Boulevard Subway is a proposed SEPTA Metro line that would run along Roosevelt Boulevard in Northeast Philadelphia, Pennsylvania.

The line has been proposed in various forms for over a century, with the idea originally dating to 1913. The most recent government study, conducted in 2024, envisions the service as a branch of the B that would draw 43,800 daily riders. Independent studies have estimated the ridership potential at up to 62,000 per day. Bus rapid transit and light rail have also been studied for the corridor.

== History ==
The route was first proposed in 1913 as part of the Broad Street Subway line by Transportation Commissioner A. Merritt Taylor, as part of a plan that included multiple other unrealized subway lines to Northwest Philadelphia, Darby, and Camden. The line was not built, and would be considered again in the 1920s, 1940s, and 1960s.

=== 1960s ===
The Roosevelt Boulevard Subway was again proposed in 1960 as part of Philadelphia's "Comprehensive Plan". The plan envisioned the line connecting to the Broad Street Line at Erie station, running on the existing express tracks before joining Roosevelt Boulevard and continuing to Grant Avenue. The plan also proposed extending the Market Frankford Line to Rhawn Street, however it did not include a direct connection to the proposed RBS. In 1967, an underground subway station was built on Roosevelt Boulevard on Adams Avenue, financed by Sears, which had a large location close by. Economic and political factors prevented a buildout of the line itself, and the station at Adams Avenue was destroyed during the implosion of the Sears building in the 1990s.

=== 2003 study ===
Cost estimates ranged between $2.5 and $3.4 billion (Note: equivalent to $4.67 billion and 6.36 billion in 2025 adjusted for inflation) in the study. The cost range largely depended on if constructing all stations in open cuts, rather than strictly underground, was feasible. It was estimated to draw 124,523 daily boardings, approximately the current ridership of the Broad Street Line, and divert 83,300 daily automobile trips. The project did not move forward due to lack of local financing.

=== 2020s ===
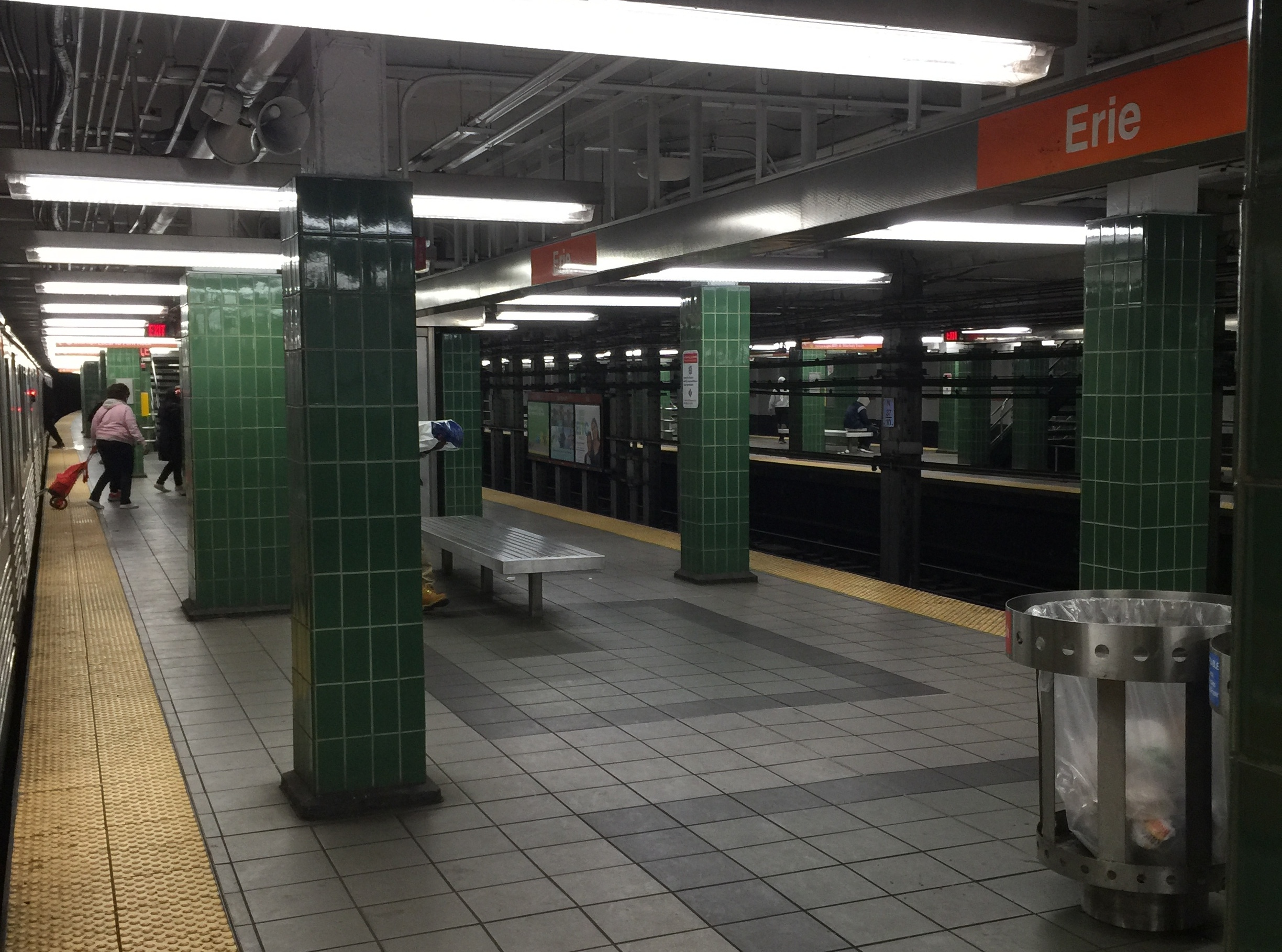
Erie station is the proposed junction between the Broad Street Line and the Roosevelt Boulevard Subway.

In a August 2022 public meeting hosted by Pennsylvania representative Jared Solomon, the Philadelphia Office of Transportation and Infrastructure, transportation advocates, and media members discussed a Roosevelt Boulevard Subway, which Solomon supports. The majority of participants in the meeting, held at the PATH community center at Cottman and Castor Avenues, supported a subway among four choices; subway, elevated rail, more bus routes, or no changes.

In June 2023, the Philadelphia City Council announced it would hold hearings on the proposed subway following the collapse of an I-95 overpass that severely impacted highway travel in Northeast Philadelphia. The hearings, held on October 11, were attended by more than half a dozen state and city officials, transit experts, and residents, during which it was reported that PennDOT would include a subway in studies to evaluate transit alternatives on Roosevelt Boulevard.

In December 2024, PennDOT released their draft report which analyzed ridership forecasts for installing bus rapid transit, light rail, or a subway on Roosevelt Boulevard, alongside road network changes. The report analyzed ridership projections along the following proposed stations, with slight differences to the analysis in 2003:

- North 9th Street
- Rising Sun Avenue
- Tower Center
- Pratt Street
- Bustleton Avenue
- Cottman Avenue
- Rhawn Street
- Welsh Rd - Grant Avenue
- Red Lion Road
- Southampton Road
- Old Lincoln Highway
- Rockhill

The bus rapid transit and light rail proposals run along a similar route on Roosevelt Boulevard, with both making a diversion to directly serve Frankford Transit Center, and then continuing to Wissahickon Transit Center past Broad Street.

The agency projected daily average ridership of up to 25,100 for bus rapid transit, 37,700 for light rail, and 43,800 for a subway. An independent study released by Elif Ensari Sucuoglu, Joao Paulouro and Eric Goldwyn of New York University's Marron Institute of Urban Management estimated that the Roosevelt Boulevard Subway would attract between 51,000 - 62,000 daily riders, depending on specifics of the transit model. While PennDOT's initial report estimated a project cost of $11 billion for the subway, the report by New York University recommended saving costs by using cut and cover construction, reduce station overbuilding, and use faster construction methods. The NYU study also recommended considering an initial $3 billion construction of the first seven stations (to Rhawn Street), which account for 90% of the projected ridership.

In September 2026, PennDOT and the city of Philadelphia announced $134 million in traffic safety improvements to Roosevelt Boulevard, and specified that more engagement around the future of transit on the corridor would occur in 2027.

== Proposed construction ==
When studied in detail in 2003, a number of alignments and construction options were considered. These included running within the median of a highway that would replace the Boulevard, an alternate route that would follow and replace the current SEPTA Regional Rail Fox Chase Line, and an at grade route that would function similarly to the city's subway–surface trolley lines.

In the 2003 study's preferred alignment, the Roosevelt Boulevard Subway would split east from the B underground at Erie station, using an already extant flying junction with the express tracks. It would then tunnel to Roosevelt Boulevard and be constructed cut and cover until Blue Grass Road near the northern edge of Philadelphia. The line would then run aboveground and an elevated structure would extend nearly to the county line. Additionally, a cut and cover extension of the L would be constructed under Bustleton Avenue, north from Frankford Transit Center, to interchange with the Roosevelt Boulevard Subway.
