= Twin Bridges (Philadelphia) =

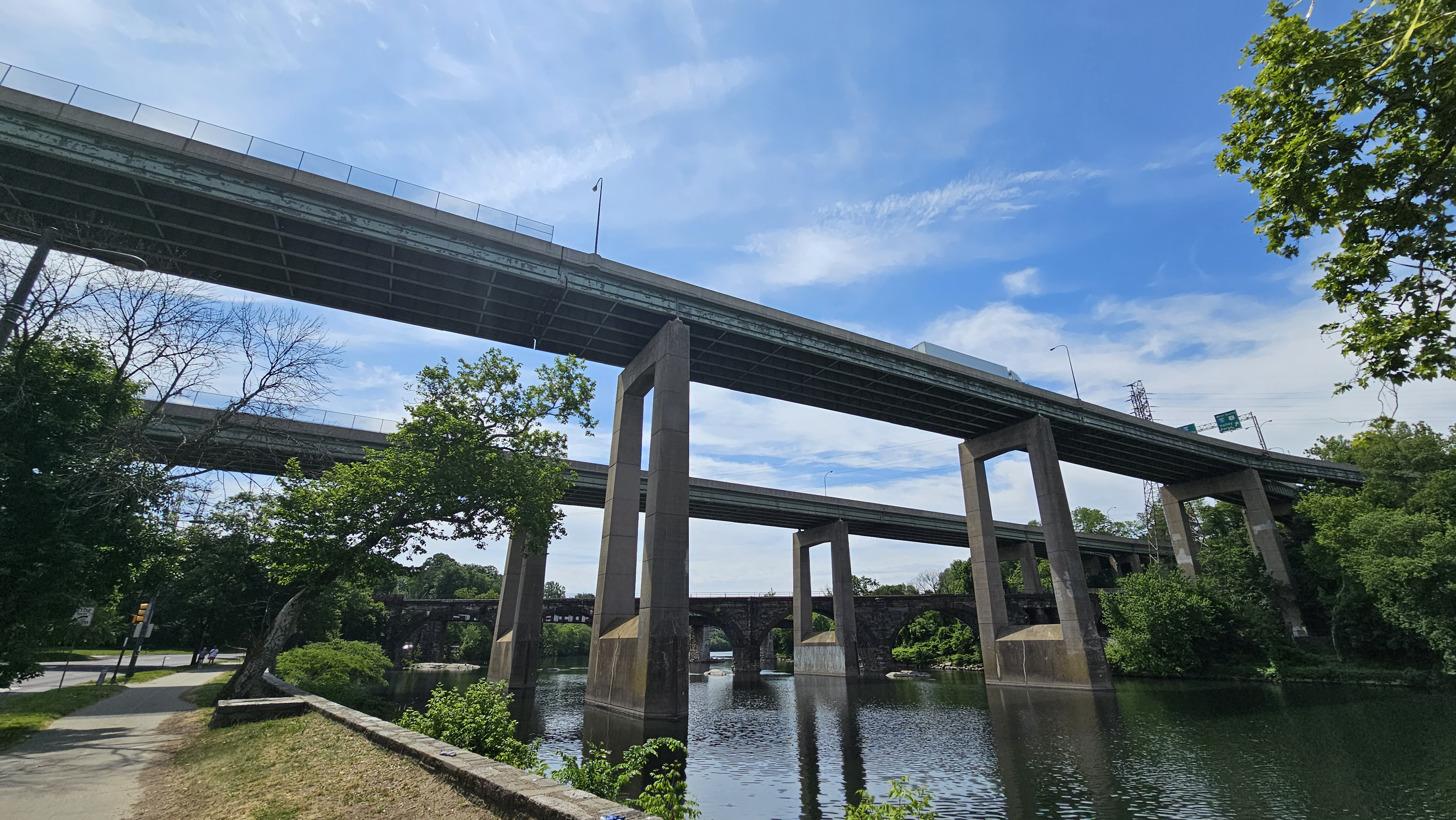
- The bridges in 2023, looking south
- Coordinates: 40.0067°N 75.1929°W
- Carries: US 1 (Roosevelt Expressway)
- Crosses: Schuylkill River
- Locale: Fairmount Park, Philadelphia
- Official name: Twin Bridges

Characteristics
- Design: Steel plate girder

History
- Opened: 1960

Statistics
- Daily traffic: 109,000 (2010)
- Toll: none

The Twin Bridges are a pair of steel-plate girder bridges that span the Schuylkill River in Fairmount Park in Philadelphia, Pennsylvania. They carry northbound and southbound traffic on US 1 (Roosevelt Expressway) just north of its intersection with Interstate 76.

The northbound bridge has 11 spans and is 1,921 feet long, while the southbound bridge has 12 spans and is 1,990 feet long. The bridges were built in 1960 and partially rebuilt (redecked) in 1985 and again in 2010. Each bridge carries three lanes of traffic.

The bridges span the Schuylkill River, Dr. Martin Luther King Drive, Kelly Drive, Ridge Avenue, ramps to and from Ridge Avenue, and railroad tracks, including the Philadelphia & Reading Railroad Schuylkill River Viaduct.

The bridges' design was awarded a Certificate of Award Class II (Honorable Mention) by the American Institute of Steel Construction, who designated it one of "America's Most Beautiful Bridges".

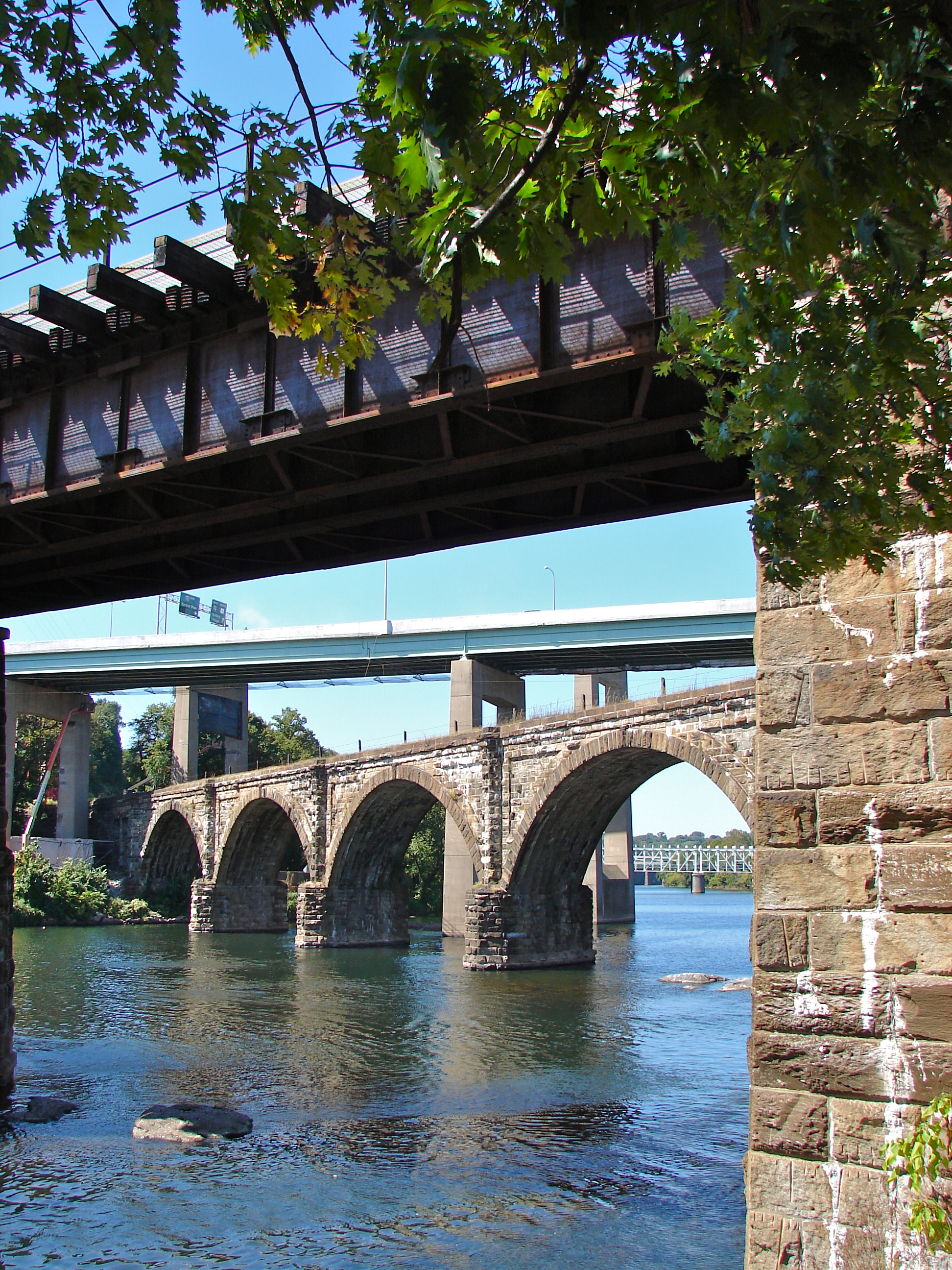
5 bridges, looking north on the Schuylkill

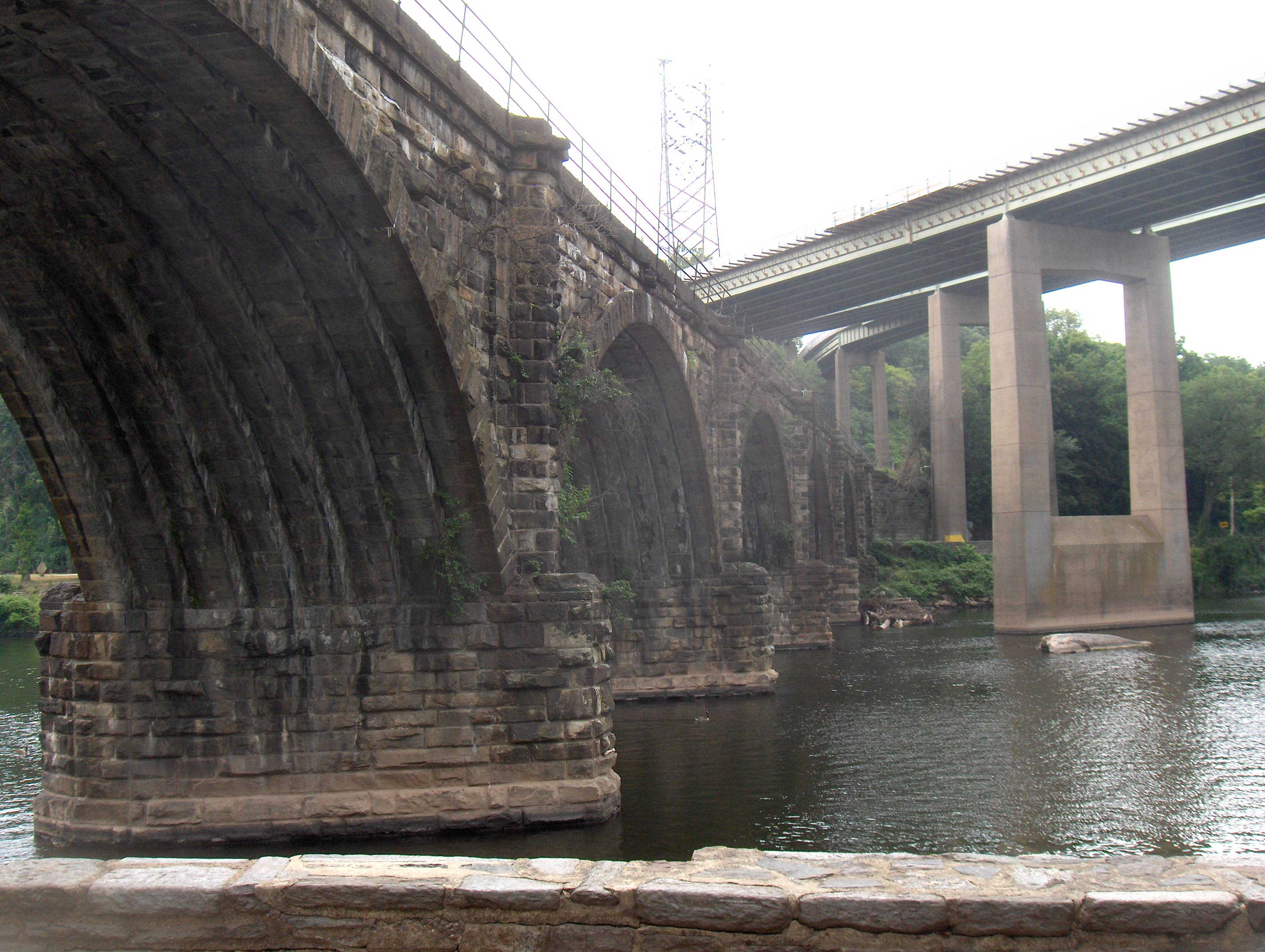
Twin Bridges on the right,
and the Falls Bridge (1856)

== See also ==
- List of crossings of the Schuylkill River
