= Roosevelt Boulevard (Philadelphia) =

Street in Pennsylvania, United States of America

Coordinates: 40.032937°N 75.079879°W

Roosevelt Boulevard
- Theodore Roosevelt Memorial Boulevard
- Roosevelt Boulevard highlighted in red Roosevelt Expressway highlighted in blue

Route information
- Maintained by PennDOT and City of Philadelphia
- Length: 14.9 mi (24.0 km)
- Component highways: US 1 for its entire length US 13 from Hunting Park to Mayfair; PA 63 in Somerton

Major junctions
- South end: I-76 / US 1 in West Fairmount Park
- PA 611 in Hunting Park; US 13 in Hunting Park; PA 232 in Frankford; US 13 in Mayfair; PA 73 in Mayfair; PA 63 in Somerton
- North end: US 1 in Trevose

Location
- Country: United States
- State: Pennsylvania
- Counties: Philadelphia

Highway system
- Pennsylvania State Route System; Interstate; US; State; Scenic; Legislative

Roosevelt Boulevard, officially named the Theodore Roosevelt Memorial Boulevard and locally known as "the Boulevard", is a major traffic artery through North and Northeast Philadelphia. The road begins at Interstate 76 in Fairmount Park, running as a freeway also known as the Roosevelt Boulevard Extension or the Roosevelt Expressway through North Philadelphia, then transitioning into a twelve-lane boulevard that forms the spine of Northeast Philadelphia to its end at the city line.

Roosevelt Boulevard is part of the Lincoln Highway, the first road across America, which ran for 3,389 miles (5,454 km) from Times Square in New York City to Lincoln Park on the Pacific Ocean in San Francisco.

Roosevelt Boulevard is designated as US 1. Portions are concurrent with US 13 (between Hunting Park Avenue and Robbins Street) and Pennsylvania Route 63 (between Red Lion and Woodhaven Roads).

The road is notorious for two intersections, which have been designated the second and third-most dangerous intersections in the nation by State Farm, at Red Lion Road and Grant Avenue, respectively. The dangerous reputation of the road led to installation of the first red light cameras in Philadelphia in 2004. The road has been the scene of numerous pedestrian casualties and studies are underway to allow pedestrian traffic to be separated from vehicular traffic.

== Route description ==
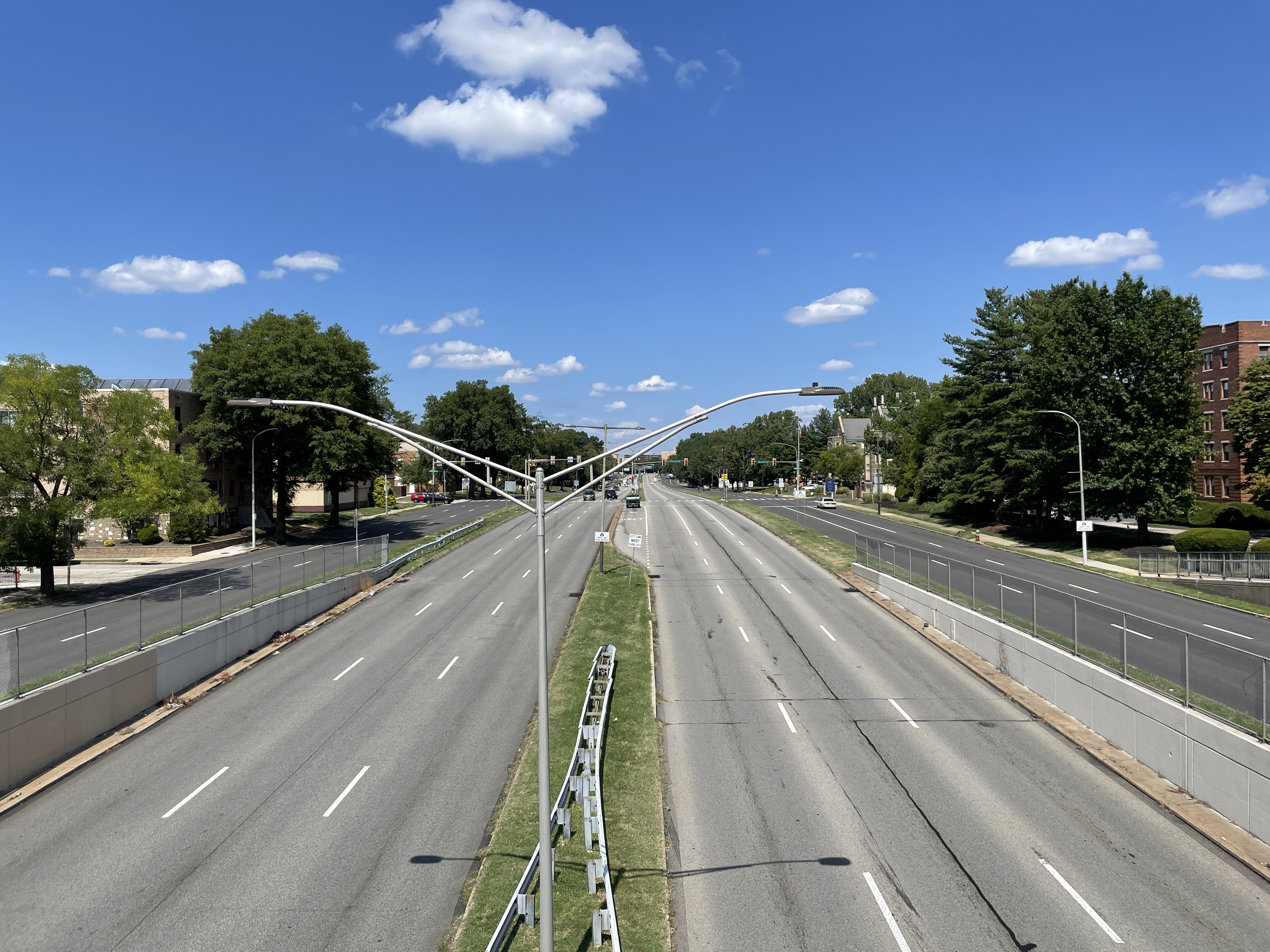
Roosevelt Boulevard northbound past Solly Avenue/Holme Avenue

=== Roosevelt Expressway ===
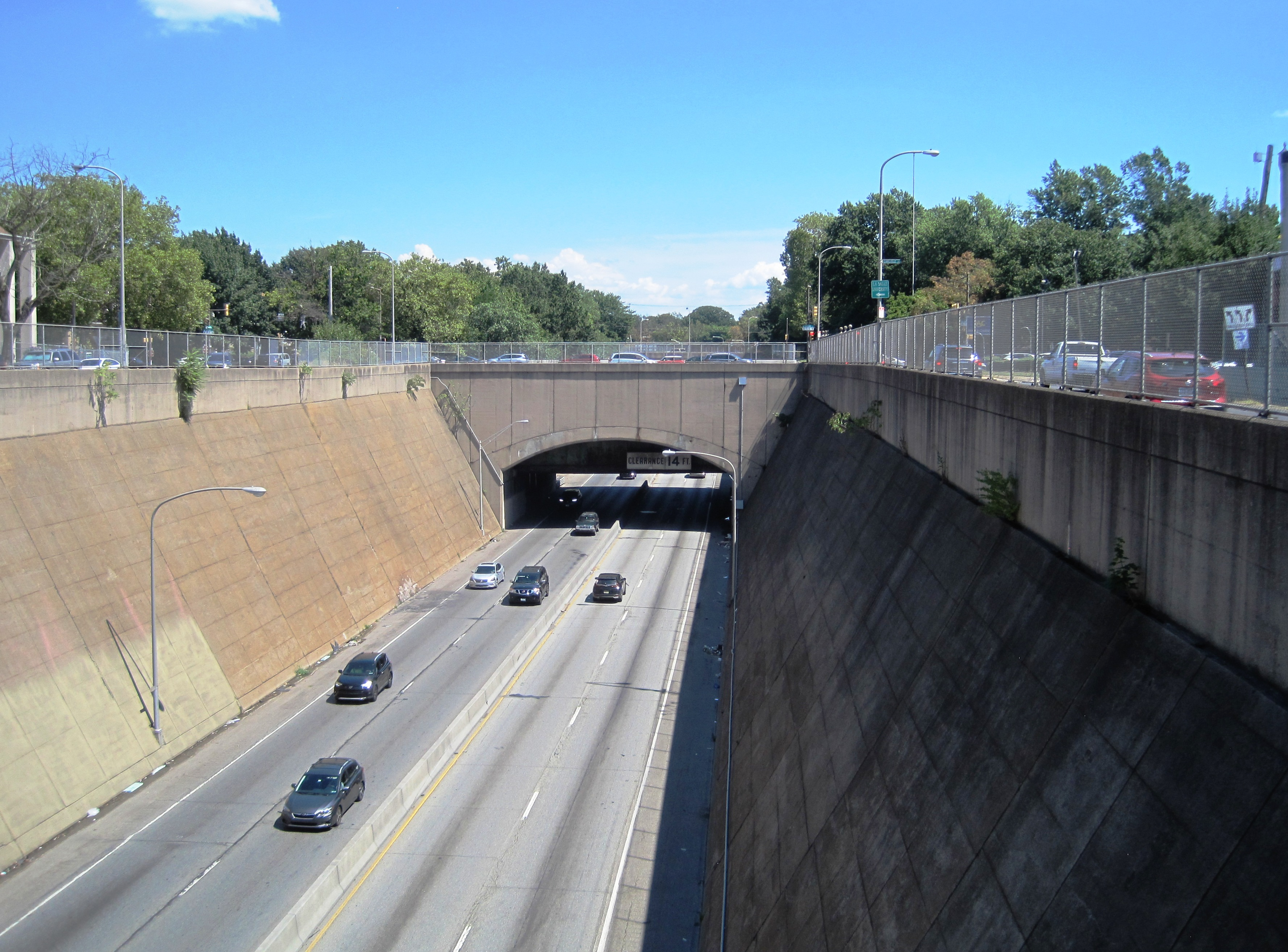
Overpass carrying PA 611 / North Broad Street and Broad Street Line over Roosevelt Expressway

The Roosevelt Boulevard Extension, also known as the Roosevelt Expressway, begins at Interstate 76 in Fairmount Park adjacent to the Philadelphia city line, as an expressway, also known as the Roosevelt Boulevard Expressway U.S. Route 1. It crosses the Schuylkill River via the Twin Bridges and runs eastward through the neighborhoods of East Falls and Hunting Park. The Roosevelt Expressway interchanges with Broad Street (Pennsylvania Route 611) and ends at an interchange with US 13 (Roosevelt Boulevard), at which point US 1 merges onto the Roosevelt Boulevard and continues northeast along with US 13.

=== Roosevelt Boulevard ===
The Roosevelt Boulevard begins at an intersection with Hunting Park Avenue, continuing northeast as a part of US 13. The road crosses Broad Street (PA 611) before US 1 (Roosevelt Expressway) merges in at an interchange and Roosevelt Boulevard becomes a 12-lane surface arterial with local and express lanes and at-grade intersections, carrying US 1 and US 13.

The road continues east through Hunting Park and Feltonville, where it curves and resumes running in a northeasterly direction. It meets Oxford Avenue (Pennsylvania Route 232) at a large traffic circle known as Oxford Circle (the express lanes pass through the circle via an underpass). The road carries northbound U.S. Route 13 one more mile until it splits off onto Robbins Street and Levick Street (both one-way streets). The road continues to a large interchange with Cottman Avenue (Pennsylvania Route 73) and the Roosevelt Mall, followed by another interchange with Holme and Solly Avenues, providing access to Pennypack Park. There is access to both avenues from the local lanes, both north- and southbound. The boulevard continues past Pennypack Park and Northeast Philadelphia Airport, passing through two notoriously dangerous intersections with Grant Avenue and Red Lion Road.

The road continues northeast, interchanging with Woodhaven Road (Pennsylvania Route 63), then narrowing as it approaches its end at an intersection on the Philadelphia-Bucks County border. After two traffic light intersections in Trevose in Bensalem Township, U.S. 1 continues as a freeway to the north.

== Public transportation ==
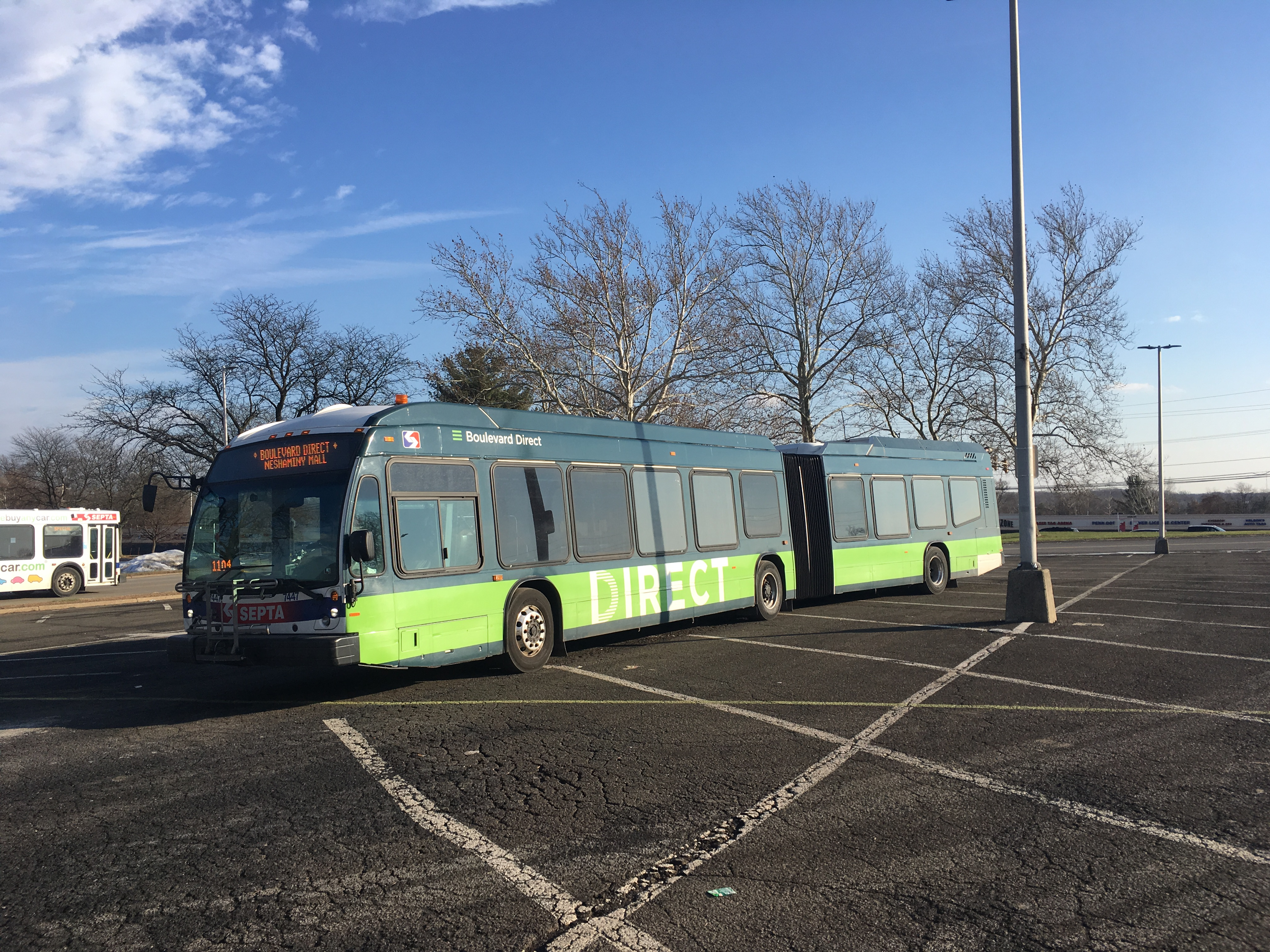
The Boulevard Direct, a limited-stop bus route that operates along a portion of Roosevelt Boulevard

Several SEPTA City Bus routes operate along portions of Roosevelt Boulevard, with routes 1, 14, and 82 following the boulevard for a significant distance. The Route 1 bus runs along the entire length of Roosevelt Boulevard as part of its route between 54th Street and City Avenue in West Philadelphia and Parx Casino and Racing in Bensalem. The Route 14 bus follows Roosevelt Boulevard north of Bustleton Avenue as part of its route between the Frankford Transportation Center to the south and the Neshaminy Mall and Oxford Valley Mall to the north. The Route 82 bus follows Roosevelt Boulevard south of Pratt Street as part of its route between the Wissahickon Transportation Center and the Frankford Transportation Center. The portion of Roosevelt Boulevard north of Bustleton Avenue is also served by the Boulevard Direct, a limited-stop bus route between the Frankford Transportation Center and the Neshaminy Mall. The Boulevard Direct offers improved travel times compared to traditional bus service along Route 14, with more frequent service and several bus stops located on the far side of intersections to improve performance.

=== Proposed Roosevelt Boulevard Subway ===
The Roosevelt Boulevard Subway is a proposed SEPTA Metro line that would run along Roosevelt Boulevard. The route was first proposed in 1913 as part of the Broad Street Subway line from Adams Avenue. Last studied in detail in 2003, the line was estimated to draw 124,523 daily boardings, approximately the current ridership of the Broad Street Line, and divert 83,300 daily automobile trips. Cost estimates ranged between $2.5 and $3.4 billion in year 2000 dollars. The project however did not move forward due to lack of local financing.

In June 2023, Philadelphia's City Council announced it would hold hearings on the proposed subway following the collapse of an I-95 overpass that severely impacted highway travel in Northeast Philadelphia.

== History ==
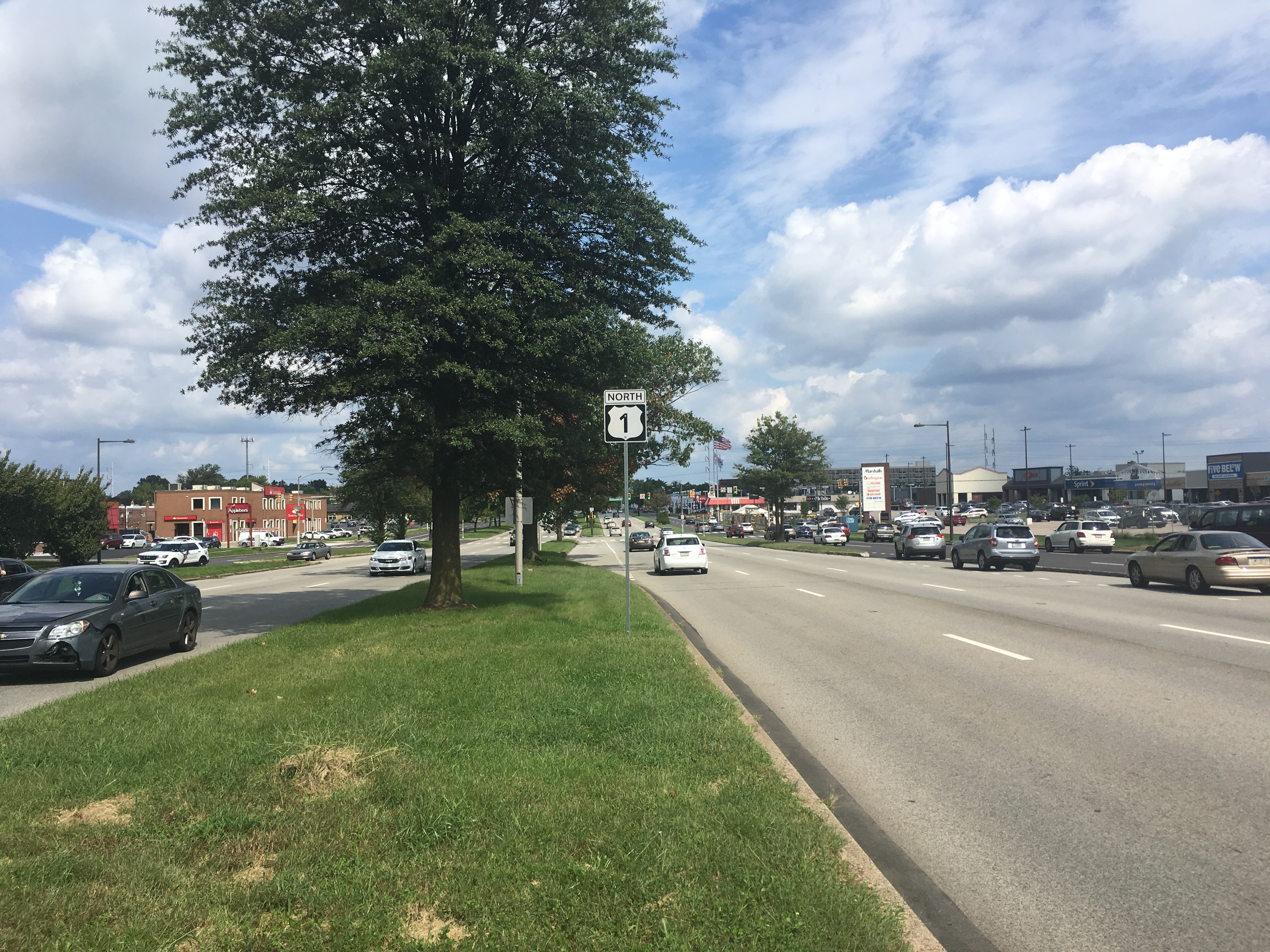
Roosevelt Boulevard (US 1) northbound past Welsh Road

Proposed in 1903 by Mayor Samuel H. Ashbridge as part of the City Beautiful movement, the 300-foot-wide thoroughfare originally extended from Broad Street to the Torresdale neighborhood, and was first named Torresdale Boulevard, then Northeast Boulevard in 1914 when the road was completed. On its extension to Pennypack Creek in 1918, it was finally renamed to Roosevelt Boulevard, in honor of Theodore Roosevelt. The road was designated U.S. 1 in 1926, and was extended through Philadelphia to neighboring Bucks County in the post-World War II years.

The Roosevelt Expressway was built to connect the boulevard with the nearby Schuylkill Expressway (I-76).

In 1998 a series of gang-related criminal rock throwing attacks on cars driving near Ridge Avenue, Henry Avenue and Fox Street "terrorized" Philadelphia drivers.

In 2000, by act of the state legislature, the Boulevard was designated the "Police Officer Daniel Faulkner Memorial Highway" in memory of Daniel Faulkner, a Philadelphia police officer whom Mumia Abu-Jamal was convicted of having slain in the line of duty in 1981. The designation is alongside the roadway's official name of Roosevelt Boulevard.

There have been several plans to change the boulevard into an expressway-like artery, like the Roosevelt Expressway itself, and construct a subway underneath the boulevard, but no such plans have been acted upon.

Today, Roosevelt Boulevard is among the most congested arteries in the country. According to a 2001 report by State Farm Insurance, the second- and third-worst intersections in the country are both found on the Boulevard, at Red Lion Road and Grant Avenue, respectively, only a mile apart from each other. Red light cameras have been installed at these intersections, as well as Cottman Avenue, and have been operational since June 1, 2005. New cameras installed at the intersections with 9th Street, Mascher Street, Levick Street, Rhawn Street, Welsh Road, and Southampton Road became operational in summer 2007. Additional plans include adding cameras at Devereaux Avenue and Tyson Avenue.

In 2016, the junction of the boulevard's outer lanes with Holme Avenue and Solly Avenue was rebuilt, converting the roundabout (known locally as the Pennypack Circle) into an at-grade intersection. Construction began in 2014 with an estimated cost of $15.5 million (equivalent to $20.2 million in 2024).

On June 1, 2020, speed cameras were activated along Roosevelt Boulevard, with a 60-day warning period before fines are issued.

== Major intersections ==
The entire road is in Philadelphia, Philadelphia County.

Location	mi	km	Destinations	Notes
West Fairmount Park	0.0	0.0	I-76 / US 1 south – Central Philadelphia, Valley Forge	Exit 340B on I-76
Schuylkill River	0.0	0.0	Twin Bridges	
East Falls–Allegheny West	0.4	0.64	Ridge Avenue / Kelly Drive	Southbound exit and northbound entrance; site of proposed interchange with Manayunk Expressway
East Falls–Allegheny West	1.0	1.6	Fox Street / Henry Avenue	Southbound exit and entrance
East Falls–Allegheny West	1.0	1.6	Wissahickon Avenue south / Hunting Park Avenue	Northbound exit and southbound entrance
Germantown–Nicetown	1.5	2.4	Wissahickon Avenue north / Germantown Avenue	Northbound exit and southbound entrance
Hunting Park–Fern Rock	2.3	3.7	PA 611 (Broad Street)	Southbound exit is via US 13
Hunting Park–Fern Rock	2.8	4.5	US 13 south (Hunting Park Avenue) / Broad Street	Southern terminus of concurrency with US 13; southbound exit and northbound entrance; no trucks to Broad Street
Hunting Park–Fern Rock	3.1	5.0	Wingohocking Street / 9th Street	At-grade intersection except northbound exit; southern terminus of frontage roads
Oxford Circle	6.4	10.3	PA 232 (Oxford Avenue) / Cheltenham Avenue / Castor Avenue	Interchange with Oxford Circle
Oxford Circle–Mayfair	7.1	11.4	US 13 north (Robbins Street) – Tacony–Palmyra Bridge	One-way northbound; northern terminus of northbound concurrency with US 13
Oxford Circle–Mayfair	7.2	11.6	US 13 (Levick Street)	One-way southbound; northern terminus of southbound concurrency with US 13
Oxford Circle–Mayfair	8.3	13.4	PA 73 (Cottman Avenue) to I-95	Interchange
Rhawnhurst	9.4	15.1	Holme Avenue / Solly Avenue	Interchange
Bustleton	10.6	17.1	PA 532 north (Welsh Road)	Right turns via frontage roads; southern terminus of PA 532
Somerton	12.4	20.0	PA 63 west (Red Lion Road)	Right turns via frontage roads; southern terminus of concurrency with PA 63
Somerton	13.7	22.0	PA 63 east (Woodhaven Road) to I-95	Interchange with frontage roads; northern terminus of concurrency with PA 63
Somerton	14.9	24.0	US 1 north (Lincoln Highway)	Continuation into Bucks County
1.000 mi = 1.609 km; 1.000 km = 0.621 mi: Concurrency terminus; Incomplete access
