= Erie station (SEPTA) =

Rapid transit station in Philadelphia

Erie
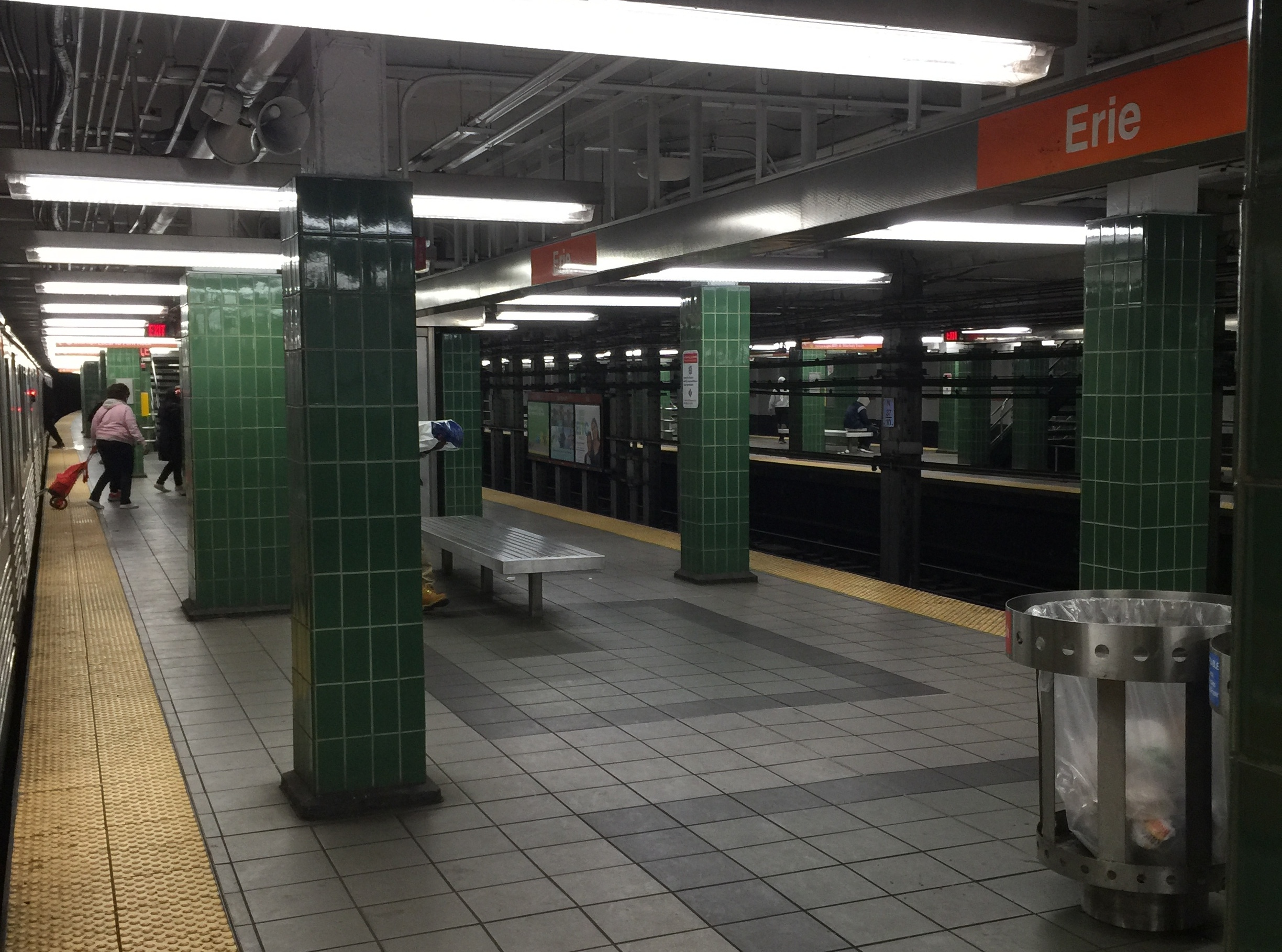
- Erie station platform

General information
- Location: 3700 North Broad Street; Philadelphia, Pennsylvania
- Coordinates: 40°00′33″N 75°09′04″W
- Owner: City of Philadelphia
- Operator: SEPTA
- Platforms: 2 island platforms
- Tracks: 4
- Connections: SEPTA City Bus: 16, 23, 53, 56, 71, 81

Construction
- Structure type: Underground
- Accessible: Partial: cross-platform transfers only, full accessibility under construction

History
- Opened: September 1, 1928

Services
Preceding station	SEPTA Metro	Following station
Broad–Allegheny toward NRG Station	B (SEPTA Metro)	Hunting Park toward Fern Rock T.C.
Broad–Girard toward Walnut–Locust	B (SEPTA Metro)	Olney T.C. toward Fern Rock T.C.
North Philadelphia toward 8th–Market	B (SEPTA Metro)	Olney T.C. toward Fern Rock T.C.
Location

Erie station is a subway station in Philadelphia, Pennsylvania, served by the B. It is located in North Philadelphia under the intersection of 3700 North Broad Street and Erie Avenue.

Since Erie is an express station, it has four tracks and two central platforms, with B2 and B3 trains operating on the inner tracks and local trains operating on the outer tracks. This station has two mezzanine levels located above the track level. One is an entrance/exit mezzanine which holds turnstiles and the payment booth, while the other is exit-only. The station is located near the former Luzerne Depot, a former trolley barn which became an all bus garage, and is now a cardboard recycling plant.

As of 2007, Erie station had approximately 6,842 boardings a day, making it the fourth busiest station on the line.

There are four layup tracks that sit above the rest of the subway north of Erie Station that are accessible by two ramps that connect to the local tracks, they served as turnbacks for the Broad-Ridge Spur until service was extended to Fern Rock.

== Gallery ==
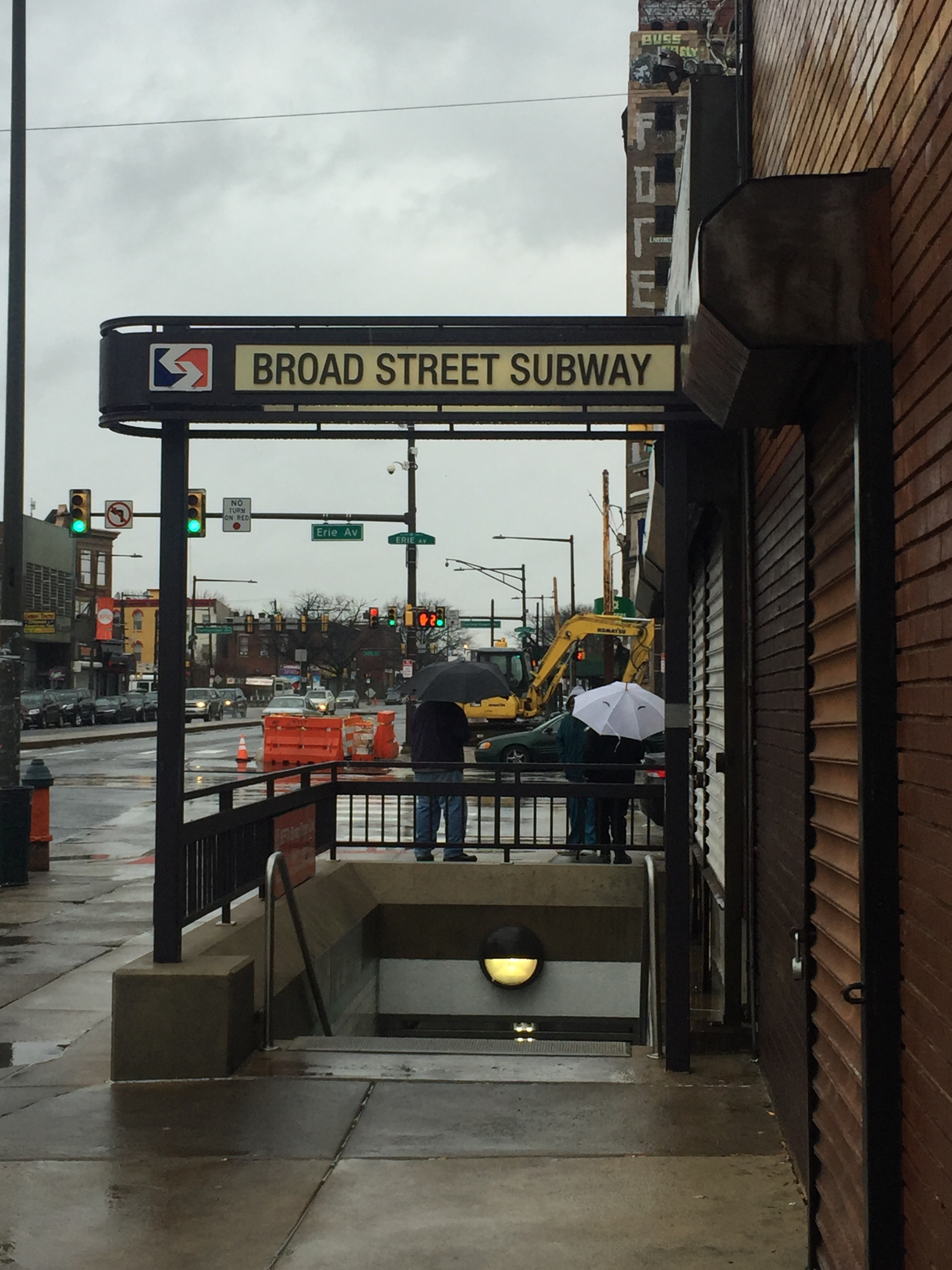
Station entrance

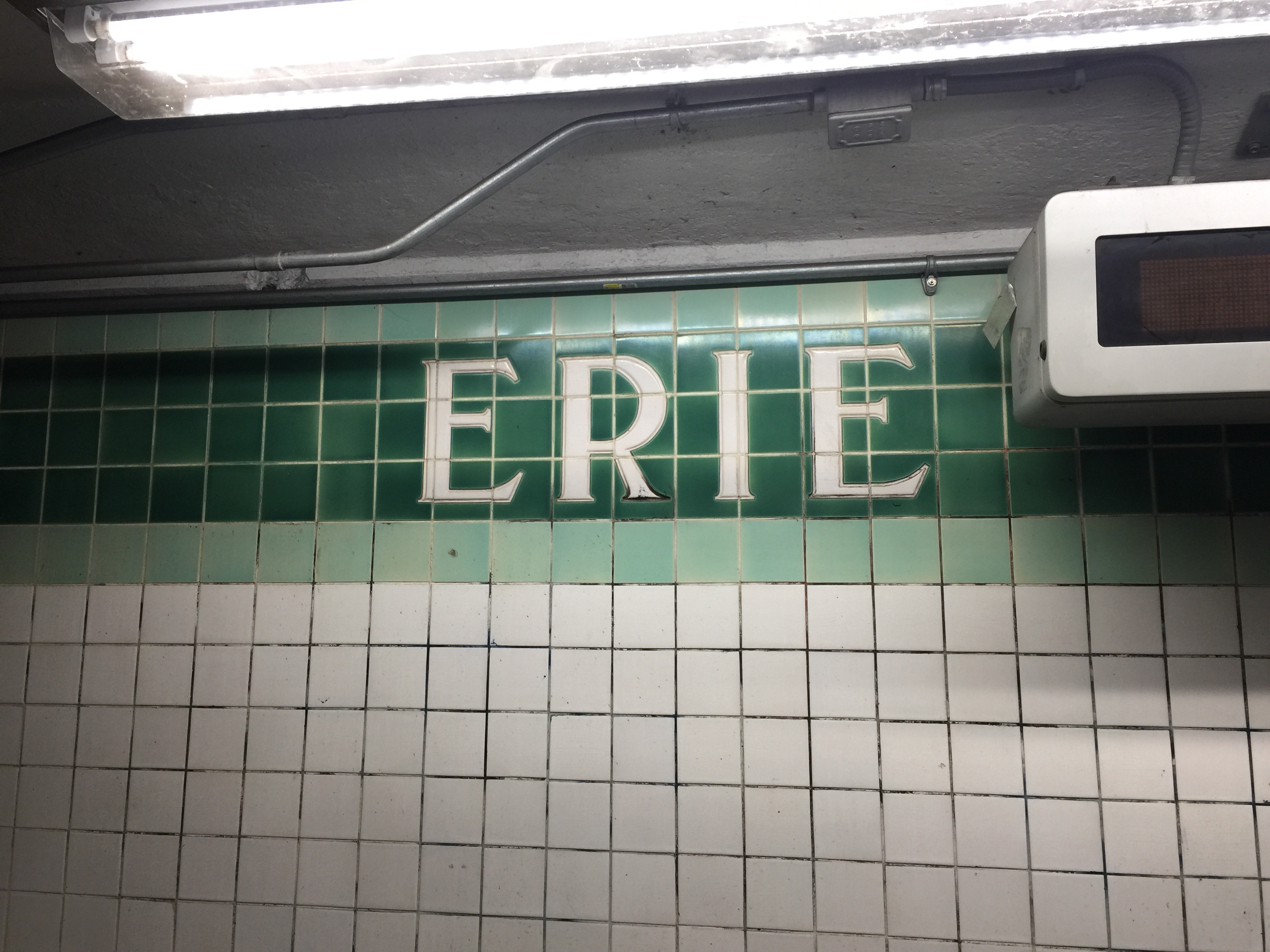
Erie station sign

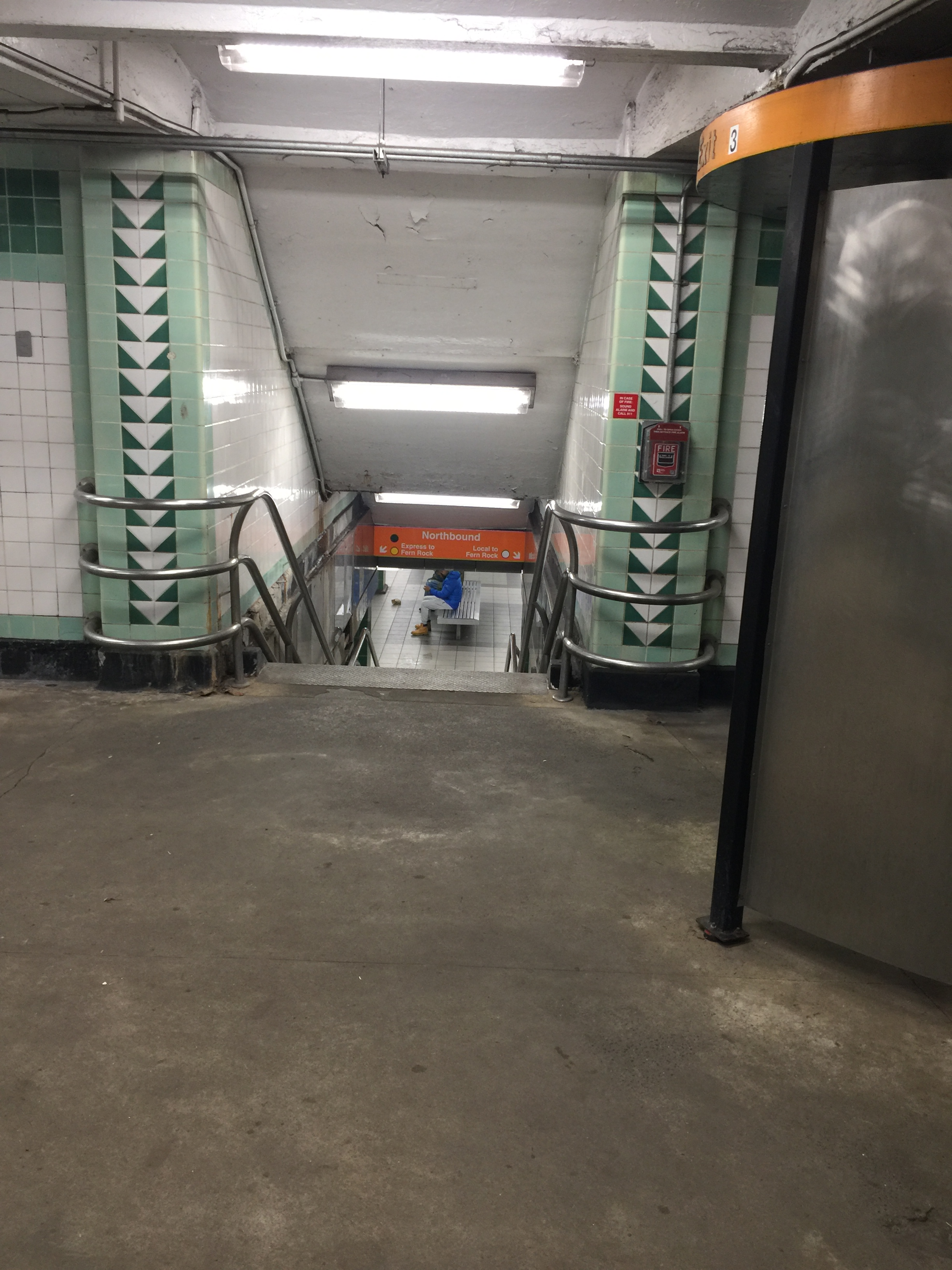
Northbound stairs

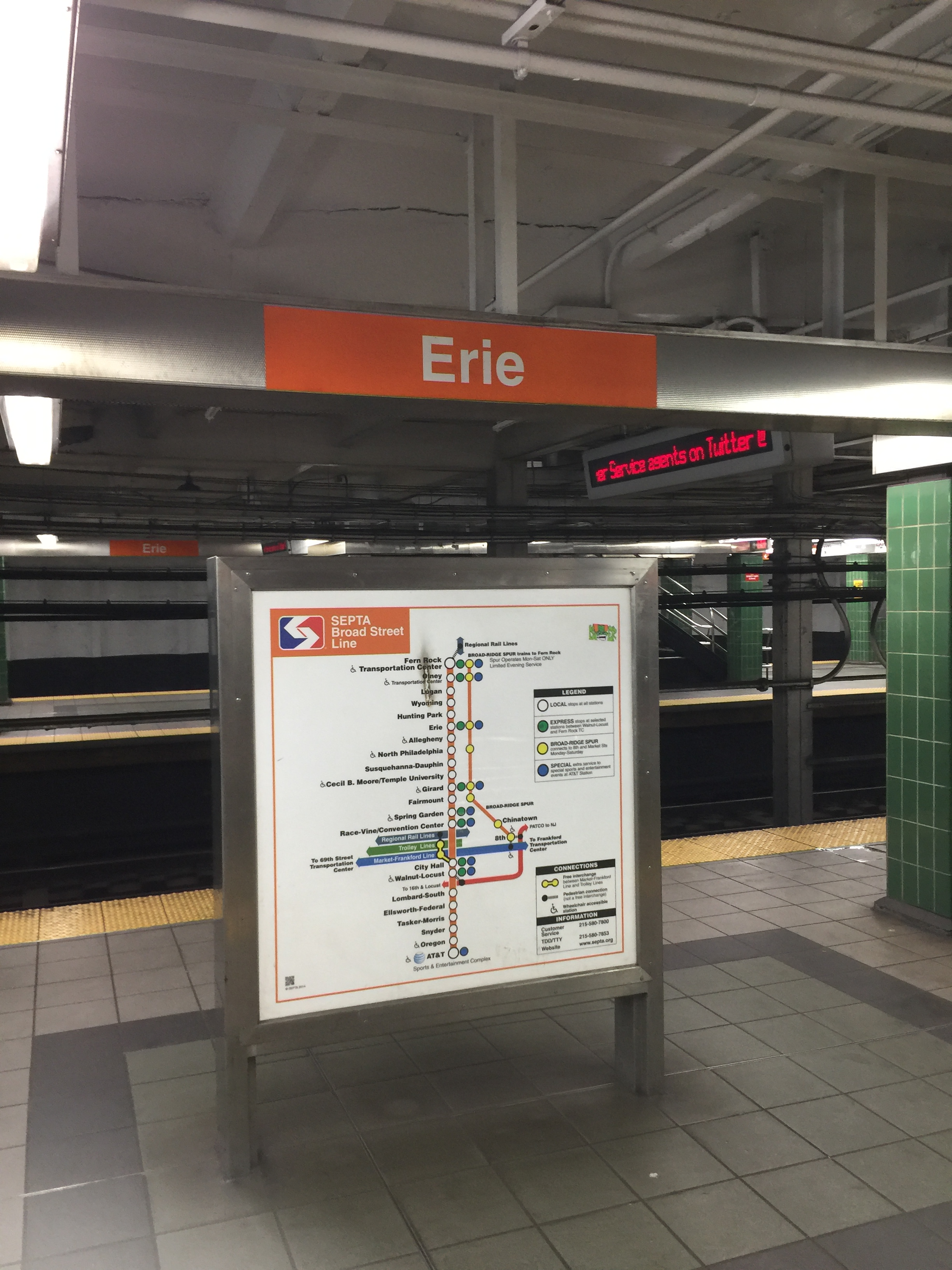
Station map

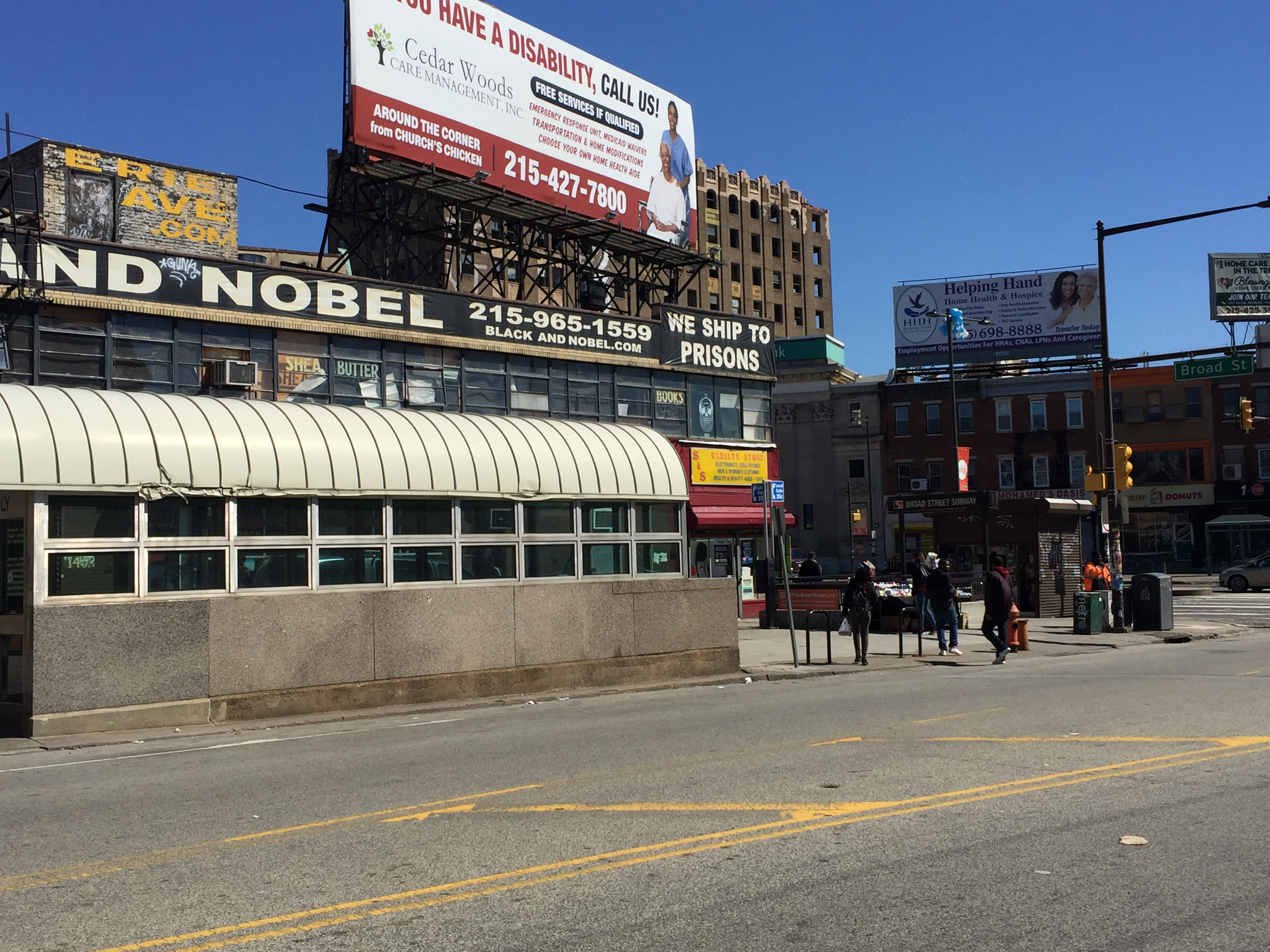
Erie station entrance

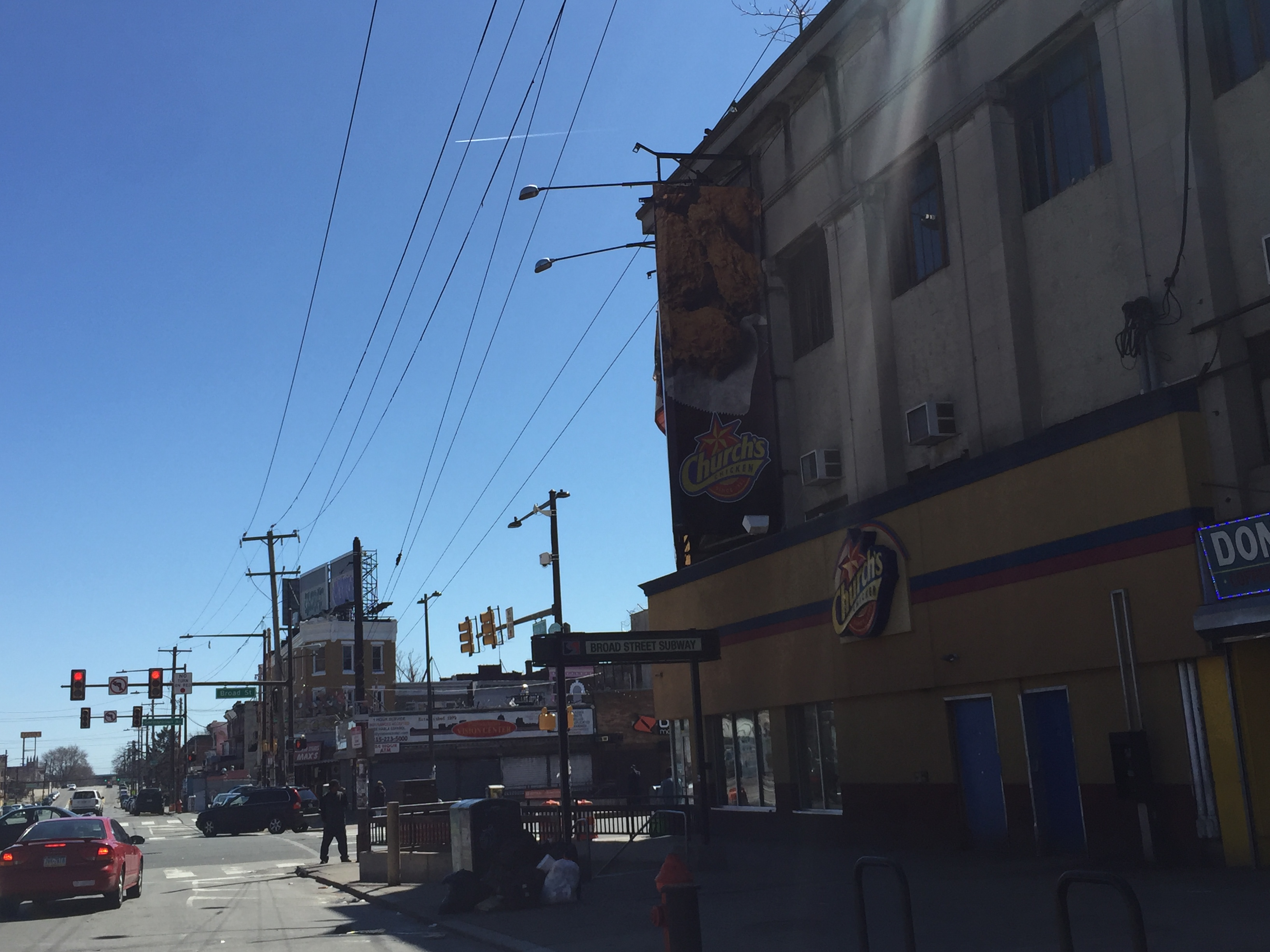
Erie station southwest entrance

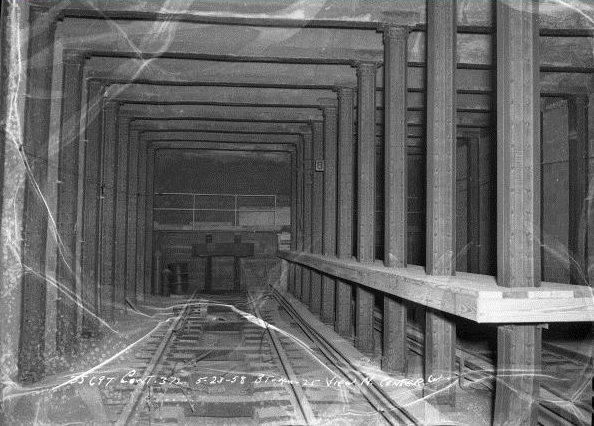
Storage tracks above the Broad Street subway north of Erie
