= Morrell Park, Philadelphia =

Morrell Park
- Neighborhood of Philadelphia
- Location within Philadelphia
- Country: United States
- State: Pennsylvania
- County: Philadelphia County
- City: Philadelphia
- Area codes: 215, 267 and 445

Morrell Park is a neighborhood located in the Northeast section of Philadelphia, Pennsylvania, United States. It is located on the eastern side of the Far Northeast, northwest of Byberry Creek and east of Northeast Philadelphia Airport.

== Characteristics ==
Morrell Park is primarily a residential district, with only a handful of small industries, all of which are located within one and one-half miles of the Northeast Philadelphia Airport. The residences themselves consist mostly of rowhouses, but Morrell Park is distinctive in that most of its row homes have garages in front, facing and with access to the street, something quite different from the traditional Philadelphia rowhouse design. (An exception is one side of one block of Wessex Lane and Churchill Lane, where houses have garages in the back with access to a shared driveway. The duplexes along Frankford Avenue are also set up in this manner.) Later rowhouses followed this form of having garages in the front, but this was first seen in Morrell Park in the very late 1950s. Most homes have kitchens that face the front, living rooms that face the rear of the property, three or four bedrooms, and about 1,200 sq ft (110 m^{2}) of living space. The street pattern of the development is also quite distinctive, as a view of an aerial photo will confirm, consisting of a few through streets that curve through many looping side streets with only one cul-de-sac, Pitt Place. The streets curve to conform to the natural topography of the area, for years avoiding development right along the stream valley of Byberry Creek, which flows through and about the development before its confluence with Poquessing Creek.

== History ==
The land area of Morrell Park was originally the 300-acre (1.2 km^{2}) summer home estate of Edward and Louise Morrell. Colonel Edward de Veaux Morrell (1863-1917), a lawyer, was a US congressman from 1900 to 1907. Born in Newport, Rhode Island, he graduated from the University of Pennsylvania in 1885. He was a colonel and afterward a brigadier general in the National Guard. He was a member of the First Troop Philadelphia City Cavalry and owned extensive land in Torresdale. His wife Louise was the daughter of Francis Anthony Drexel and Francis's second wife Emma Bouvier, related [first cousin twice removed] to Jacqueline Bouvier Kennedy. Louise's uncle was Anthony J. Drexel, founder of Drexel University, and her two older half-sisters were Elizabeth Drexel and Saint Katharine Drexel. The Morrells built their summer home , one of the five homes they maintained, near what is now Morrell and Frankford Avenues, not too far from Francis Drexel's summer home , which was itself near what is now the emergency room of Aria Health's Torresdale Campus.

The Morrells entertained extensively, maintained a horse track, established the first telephone line north of Frankford, built the electric-light plant in the area, and conducted an amusement park called Torresdale Park, located by Poquessing Creek behind the trolley barn at Frankford Avenue and Knights Road. The park ran from 1880 to 1906. After Torresdale Park closed, it donated many of its rides to Willow Grove Park, once located at the site of the present-day Willow Grove Park Mall.

The Morrells had no children. Edward Morrell served on Philadelphia's board of education from 1912 to 1916, and died in Colorado Springs, CO (where he had gone for health reasons) in September 1917; he is interred in a family crypt at Eden Hall in Torresdale. Louise died twenty-six years after her husband, in 1943, and the area was planned for development by the Korman Corporation in the late 1950s.

Morrell Park was settled in earnest during the 1960s by families moving from other areas of Philadelphia. Children attended the Aloysius Fitzpatrick Elementary School at Knights Rd & Chalfont Dr until the John Hancock Elementary School opened at West Crown & Morrell Ave in the autumn of 1968. Children also attended Christ the King School on Chesterfield Road, which opened in 1965. The population of its postal ZIP code, 19114, which covers more territory than Morrell Park alone once did, was approximated at 31,000 inhabitants in 1990.
