= Andalusia, Pennsylvania =

Historic neighborhood in Bensalem Township, Bucks County, Pennsylvania

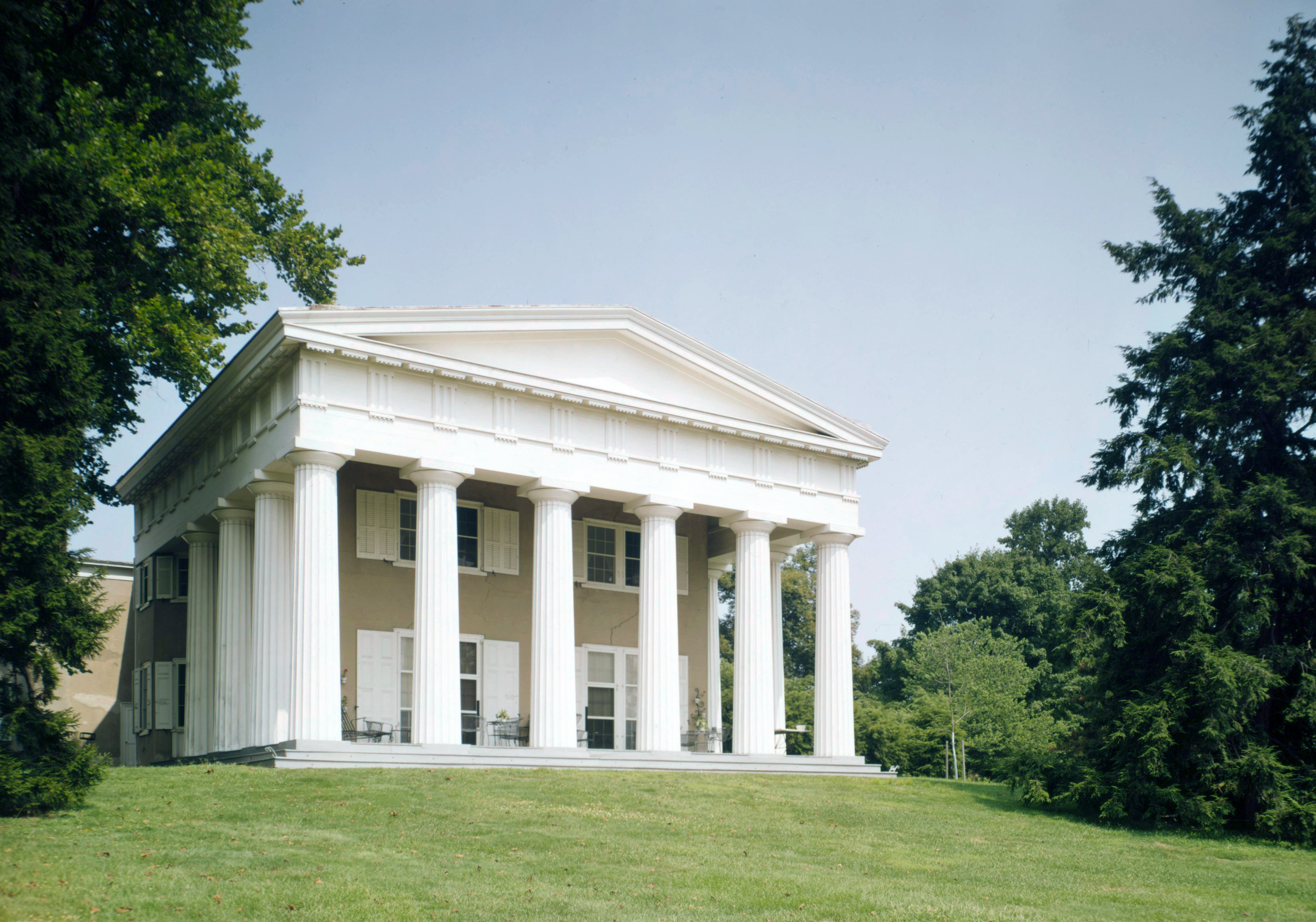
- Andalusia a NRHP site in Bensalem

- Andalusia, Pennsylvania Andalusia, Pennsylvania (the United States)
- Coordinates: 40°4′10″N 74°58′17″W
- Country: United States
- State: Pennsylvania
- Unincorporated area: Bucks

Government
  - Mayor: Joseph DiGirolamo (R)
- Elevation: 59 ft (18 m)
- Time zone: UTC-5 (EST)
  - Summer (DST): UTC-4 (EDT)
- ZIP Codes: 19020
- Area codes: 215, 267, 445

Andalusia is a historic neighborhood and unincorporated community in Bensalem Township, Pennsylvania, United States. It borders Philadelphia along the Poquessing Creek. The area is the southernmost part of the township and of the county. Its boundaries are Woodhaven Road (Pennsylvania Route 63) to the northeast, the Delaware River to the east and south, and Poquessing Creek to the north and west. Interstate 95 - Delaware Expressway runs through its southeastern section near the Delaware River. The neighborhood takes its name from Andalusia, the estate of Philadelphia financier Nicholas Biddle (1786–1844), now preserved as a National Historic Landmark.

In 1922, the unincorporated village was named Torresdale Manor, after the neighboring Torresdale section of Philadelphia, and some developments in the area are still associated with that name.

Today, Andalusia is a middle class suburb, mainly typical of the area. Many of its grid-style streets contain small single-family homes that date back to the 1920s. Andalusia is also home to many historic buildings, some dating back to the early nineteenth century, owned and inhabited by some of Philadelphia's wealthiest families. Architectural styles include Gothic Revival, Romanesque, and Greek Revival. The neighborhood's main thoroughfare, Bristol Pike (US Route 13, formerly King's Highway), reveals various homes and churches that have been preserved, while the most esteemed buildings, including Biddle's estate, the Pen Ryn mansion, and State in Schuylkill, are hidden along the banks of the Delaware. Saint Katharine Drexel is buried at the Katharine Drexel Shrine, which is also in the area on Bristol Pike. The Red Lion Inn was located here, at the Red Lion Bridge, along King's Highway (Bristol Pike), at the Poquessing Creek.

The area contains several shopping areas and abuts the Philadelphia Mills mall. Local students attend the Bensalem Township School District.

The NBC pilot episode for Outlaw, starring Jimmy Smits filmed here March 22–23, 2010.

Rita's Water Ice opened their first store in the area.

== Demographics ==
Historical population
Census	Pop.	Note	%±

The United States Census Bureau defined Andalusia as a census designated place (CDP) in 2023.
