= Lucretia Winslow Chapman =

American teacher acquitted of murder in 1831

- Born: Lucretia Winslow ca. 1788; Barre Plains, Massachusetts
- Died: 1841 (aged about 53)
- Spouse: Dr. William Chapman (married 1818-1831) Lino Amalia Espos y Mina (married 1831)
- Children: 5

Lucretia Winslow Chapman (c. 1788 – 1841) also known as Lucretia Winslow Espos y Mina was an American school teacher tried and acquitted for the 1831 murder of her first husband, Dr. William Chapman. The crime was surrounded by scandal and speculation, which drew national attention to her trial.

== Early life ==
Lucretia Winslow was born around 1788 in Barre Plains, Massachusetts. Not much is known about her family life growing up but it would later be reported that the branch of the Winslow family she was directly related to were notorious for counterfeiting and related offenses. Her father, Thomas Winslow, was known to be an expert counterfeiter and there was speculation Lucretia assisted with his crimes.

In her early 20s, Winslow moved to Philadelphia, Pennsylvania, where she worked as a teacher in Madame Le Brun's Ladies' School.

In 1818, Winslow married Dr. William Chapman, a native Englishman, when she was about 30 years old and he was in his 50s. The two settled down in Andalusia, Pennsylvania, where they had five children together: Mary, William Jr., Lucretia, John, and Abby Ann. The Chapmans ran Andalusia Boarding School together focused on curing students of speech concerns, such as stuttering. Lucretia worked at the school where she taught reading, writing, and comportment.

== The Murder of William Chapman ==
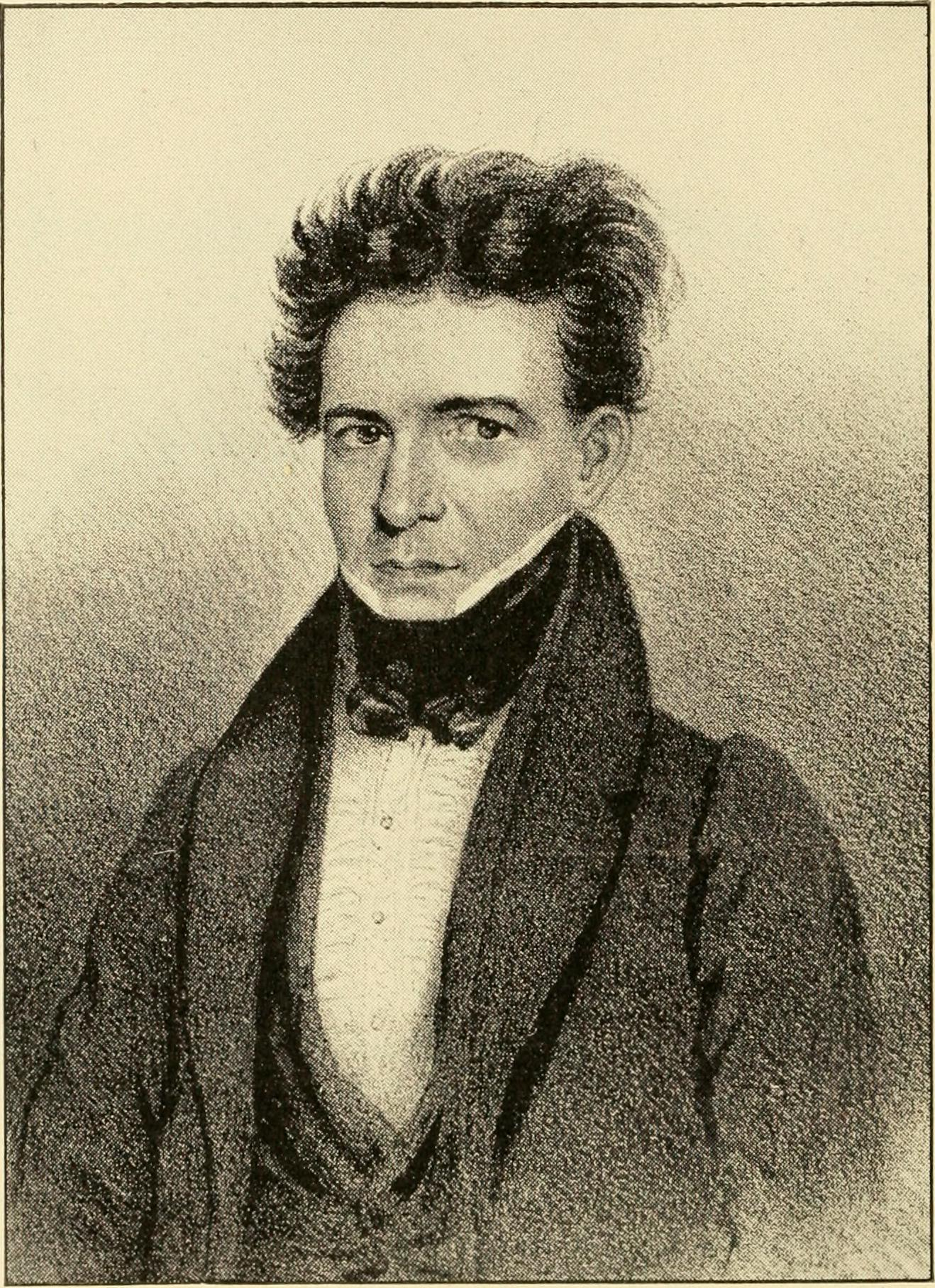
MINA, MURDERER OF DR. CHAPMAN

=== Death of Dr. Chapman ===
On May 9, 1831, Lino Amalia Espos y Mina arrived at the Chapmans' house asking for shelter for the night. According to a witness, Chapman suggested Mina go to a local tavern but Winslow offered a room in the house.

Winslow and Mina quickly grew close. Neighbors witnessed the pair spending a lot of time together and even describing the two in "compromising situations."

On June 19, 1831, Winslow sent for the local physician, Dr. John Phillips, to examine Dr. Chapman who had fallen ill two days prior. Dr. Phillips determined Chapman most likely had cholera morbus, a serious but likely non-fatal illness which was common at the time. A light diet was prescribed to remedy the situation, but the symptoms persisted. Dr. Chapman died on June 23, 1831, at his home.

=== After the Death ===
Two weeks after Dr. Chapman's funeral, Lucretia Chapman and Lino Amalia Espos y Mina were married in a discreet New York City wedding. On the same day, the newlyweds went their separate ways as Mina returned to Pennsylvania reportedly for business while Lucretia went to Schenectady, New York, to stay with her sister.

They two frequently wrote to each other while apart. Eventually, Lucretia received charges for meals and hotel rooms under Mina's name for himself and several female companions. She wrote a letter to Mina calling out his misdeeds and lies ending it with, "But no, Lino, when I pause for a moment I am constrained to acknowledge that I do not believe that God will permit either you or me to be happy this side of the grave."

=== Investigation ===
In October 1831, Dr. Chapman's body was exhumed for an autopsy. Dr. Mitchell and Mr. Clemson, two chemists, assisted in the examination and, using the resources available to them, determined arsenic was present in Dr. Chapman's body at the time of his death. Investigators discovered that Mina had purchased arsenic in Philadelphia on June 16, 1831, one day before Dr. Chapman became sick. While Mina had made the purchase, witnesses claimed to see Lucretia accompanying him.

Winslow was not in Andalusia and a reward was issued for her arrest: $150.00 if found in the state and $300.00 if found further away. In November, the Philadelphia High Constable Blaney pursued Winslow and located her in Erie County, New York, where she was arrested. On December 5, Winslow was moved from the prison in Erie to Doylestown, Pennsylvania, for the trial.

=== Trial ===
Winslow was charged with having committed the murder. The formal charges were: being principal in the first degree, indicted as principal in the first degree, and charged as principal in the first degree. She was accused of murdering her husband by putting arsenic in his chicken soup. Winslow pled "not guilty" to all charges.

She approached David Paul Brown, a highly regarded criminal lawyer, about representing her. Believing he would be able to convince a jury of her innocence, he accepted and recruited fellow attorney, Peter McCall, to assist.

There was much debate over how the prosecution of Winslow and Mina would be handled but ultimately the court decided to hold separate trials for each person. Winslow was the first of the pair to go on trial on February 14, 1832. The trial was held at the Doylestown Courthouse and was overseen by Judge John Fox.

The case was national news and the trial was highly attended. Each day, the courtroom was filled to capacity with press and attendees. According to George MacReynolds, librarian and historian for the Bucks County Historical Society, the trials "are said to have attracted more attention in this country...than any other Court trial since that of Aaron Burr for treason."

Several witnesses had been called, including a former student, Mary Palethorpe, and the Chapmans' former housekeeper, Ellen Shaw. Both of these witnesses spoke on the scandalous nature of Winslow's relationship with Mina and how the two would often go off to be alone together. The Chapman's part-time house cleaner, Ann Bantom, testified that Winslow had been the one to make the chicken soup for the ailing Dr. Chapman but did not see Winslow add anything out of the ordinary. Dr. Phillips spoke on the stand about seeing the ill Dr. Chapman, his original diagnosis of cholera morbus, and his uncertainty that arsenic had been the definitive cause of illness. In total, twenty-six witnesses had been called.

During his defense, Brown argued that Winslow had simply been another one of Mina's victims. Winslow was not the one to purchase the arsenic and, after their marriage, Mina sold the majority of Winslow's belongings.

By the third day of the trial, public opinion of Winslow began to change. Winslow was seen crying in the courtroom when the details of Dr. Chapman's suffering and death were discussed.

On February 25, the jury rendered the final verdict of "not guilty" after two hours of deliberation. Many speculate that Winslow was just as guilty as Mina, who was sentenced to death, but the jury was hesitant to hang a woman. There had also been a certain level of sympathy for Winslow due to Mina's abandonment of her after their marriage. The public announcement of the verdict was not made for several more weeks. Judge Fox placed an injunction on the reporters until Mina's trial was also completed.

== Later life ==
Little is known about the public's immediate reaction to Winslow's acquittal, but there had been reports of backlash in her life after the trial. Winslow sold her property and put the money in a trust for her children. She then went off on her own to be a performer and reportedly joined a traveling troupe of players touring the country. During a 1834 performance in Cincinnati, Ohio, Lucretia was booed off the stage.
