= Robert H. Foerderer =

American businessman and politician

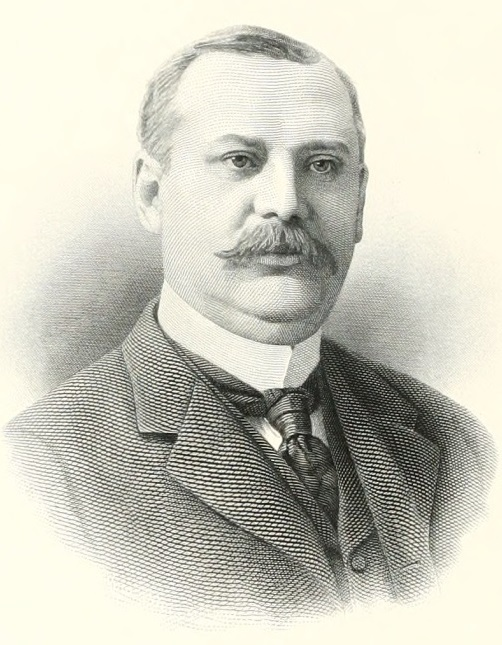
- Image from Robert H. Foerderer, Late a Representative-elect from Pennsylvania published in 1905.

Member of the U.S. House of Representatives from Pennsylvania
- In office March 4, 1901 – July 26, 1903
- Preceded by: James R. Young
- Succeeded by: Samuel A. Davenport, Galusha A. Grow
- Constituency: at-large district (1901–1903); 4th district (1903)

Personal details
- Born: May 16, 1860 Bad Frankenhausen, Schwarzburg-Rudolstadt
- Died: July 26, 1903 (aged 43) Torresdale, Philadelphia, U.S.
- Party: Republican

Robert Hermann Foerderer (May 16, 1860 – July 26, 1903) was an American businessman and politician who served as a Republican member of the U.S. House of Representatives for Pennsylvania's at-large congressional district from 1901 to 1903 and Pennsylvania's 4th congressional district in 1903.

He owned Robert H. Foerderer, Inc. which produced leather goods and invented a chrome tanning technique to create a leather product he trademarked Vici Kid.

He died in office in 1903, possibly due to chromate poisoning from his years handling chromium to perfect his chrome tanning technique.

== Early life ==
Robert H. Foerderer was born in Bad Frankenhausen, in Schwarzburg-Rudolstadt. His parents were U.S. citizens and were visiting the place of their birth. His father Edward was a manufacturer of Morocco leather. Robert attended public and private schools in Philadelphia, Pennsylvania but did not attend college

In 1881, he married Caroline Fischer and together they had two children.

== Business career ==
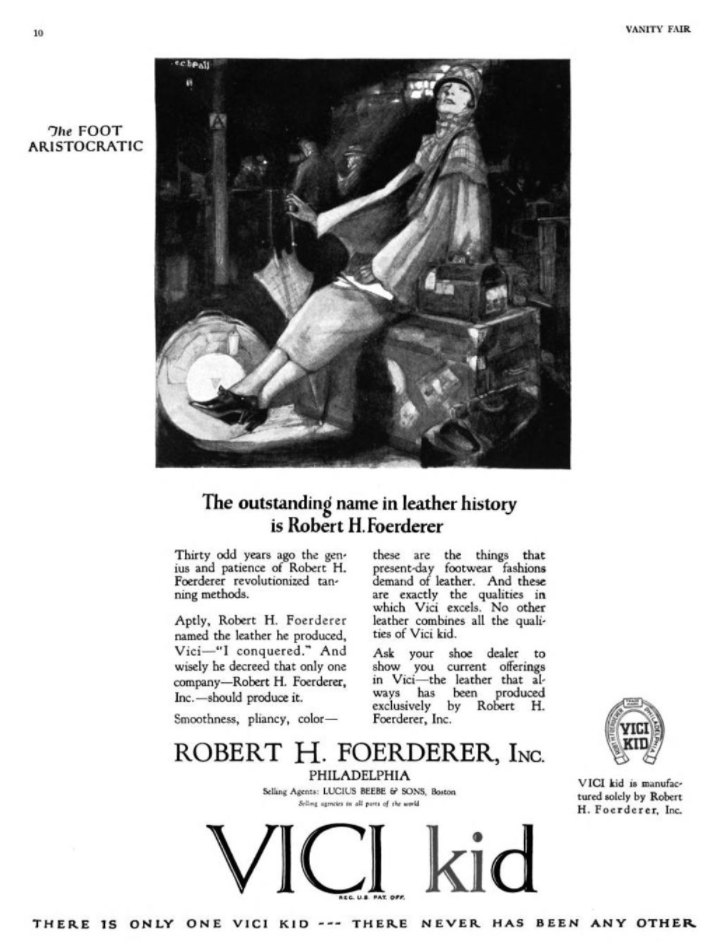
Vici kid Advertisement in Vanity Fair, 1924

Foerderer worked for a brief period as a bank clerk and entered the leather industry as an apprentice at his father's morocco leather business.

In 1885, he established Robert H. Foerderer, Inc., which also manufactured leather goods. Foerderer invented a chrome tanning technique for treating animal skin with chromium sulfate that resulted in a soft and supple leather for the production of handbags, shoes and gloves. His technique reduced the tanning time from four months to two to three weeks. Foerderer named his leather product Vici Kid — "Vici" being Latin for "I conquered" and "kid" referring to the goat skin used to make the leather. Foerderer also partnered with the Rohm & Haas chemical company to implement the use of Oropon as a replacement for dog dung in the leather softening process.

Foerderer's company began as a one-room factory in the Frankford section of Philadelphia and eventually grew to cover 17 acres. The factory employed over 4,000 people and processed 50,000 skins per day. His company also used the by-products of leather production to produce hide glue and goat hair for various uses. The glue plant was located in Philadelphia's Bridesburg neighborhood, and the goat-hair factory was near the leather plant.

Foerderer's Vici Kid leather product won the grand prize and gold medal in a competition at the 1893 Chicago World's Fair, which introduced the product to a large audience and created demand.

Foerderer served as president and director of the Keystone Telephone Company and as a member of the boards of directors for the Philadelphia Rapid Transit, the Columbia Avenue Trust Company, and the Quaker City Trust. He was a member of the Union League of Philadelphia, the Columbia Club, the Five O'Clock Club of Philadelphia, the Philadelphia Bourse, and the Manhattan Club of New York. Foerderer was a member of the Independent Order of Odd Fellows and a thirty-second degree Mason.

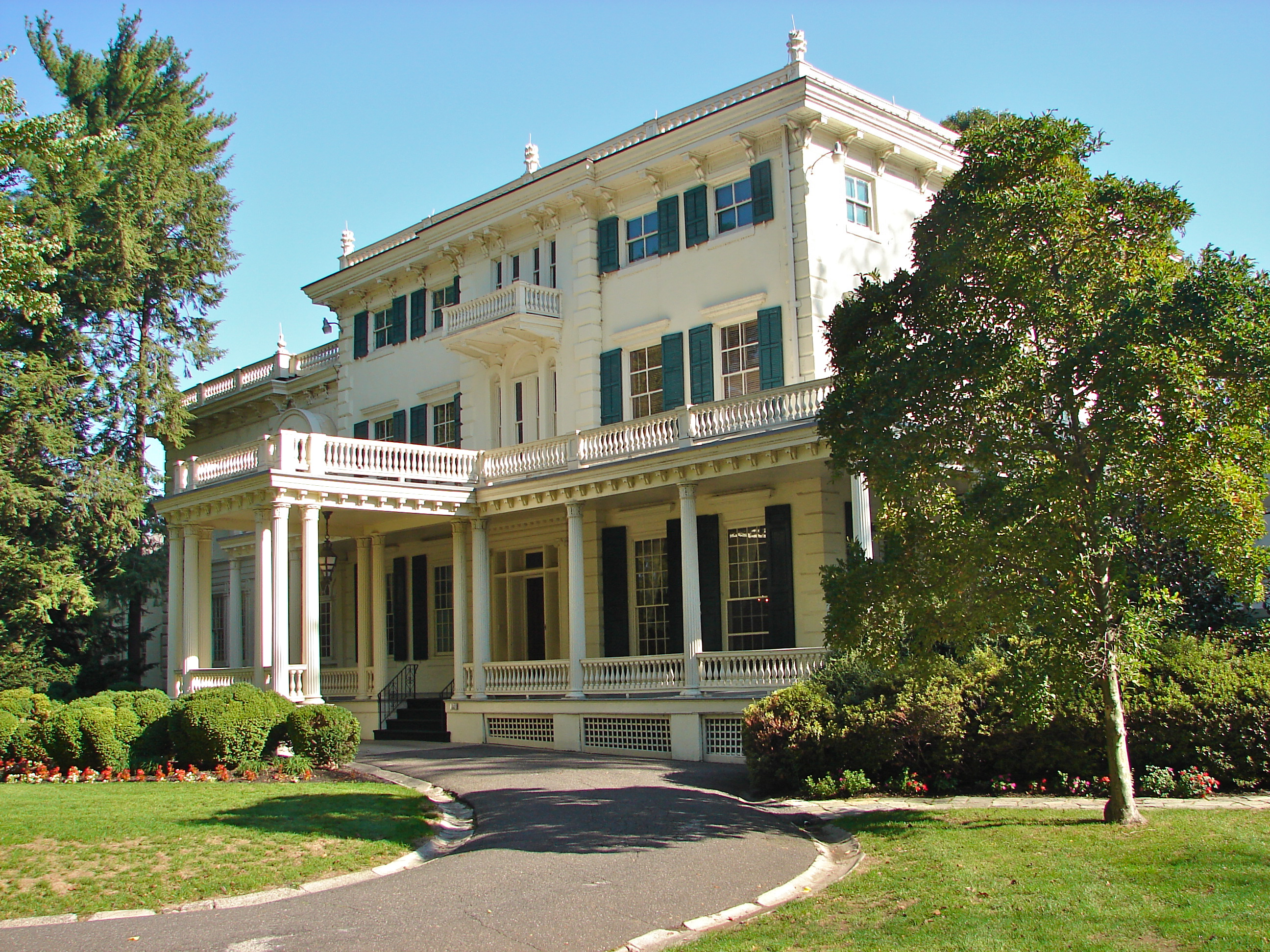
Foerderer purchased the summer home of Charles Macalester on the Delaware River and renamed it Glen Foerd

In 1895, Foerderer purchased the summer home of Charles Macalester in the Torresdale neighborhood of Philadelphia. The estate, previously named Glengarry, was renamed Glen Foerd.

== Political career ==
Foerderer was elected in 1900 as a Republican to the 57th United States Congress as a representative for Pennsylvania's at-large congressional district. He served on the committees for banking and currency, enrolled bills and ventilation and acoustics. Foerderer was re-elected in 1902 for Pennsylvania's 4th congressional district and served until his death in 1903.

== Death and legacy ==
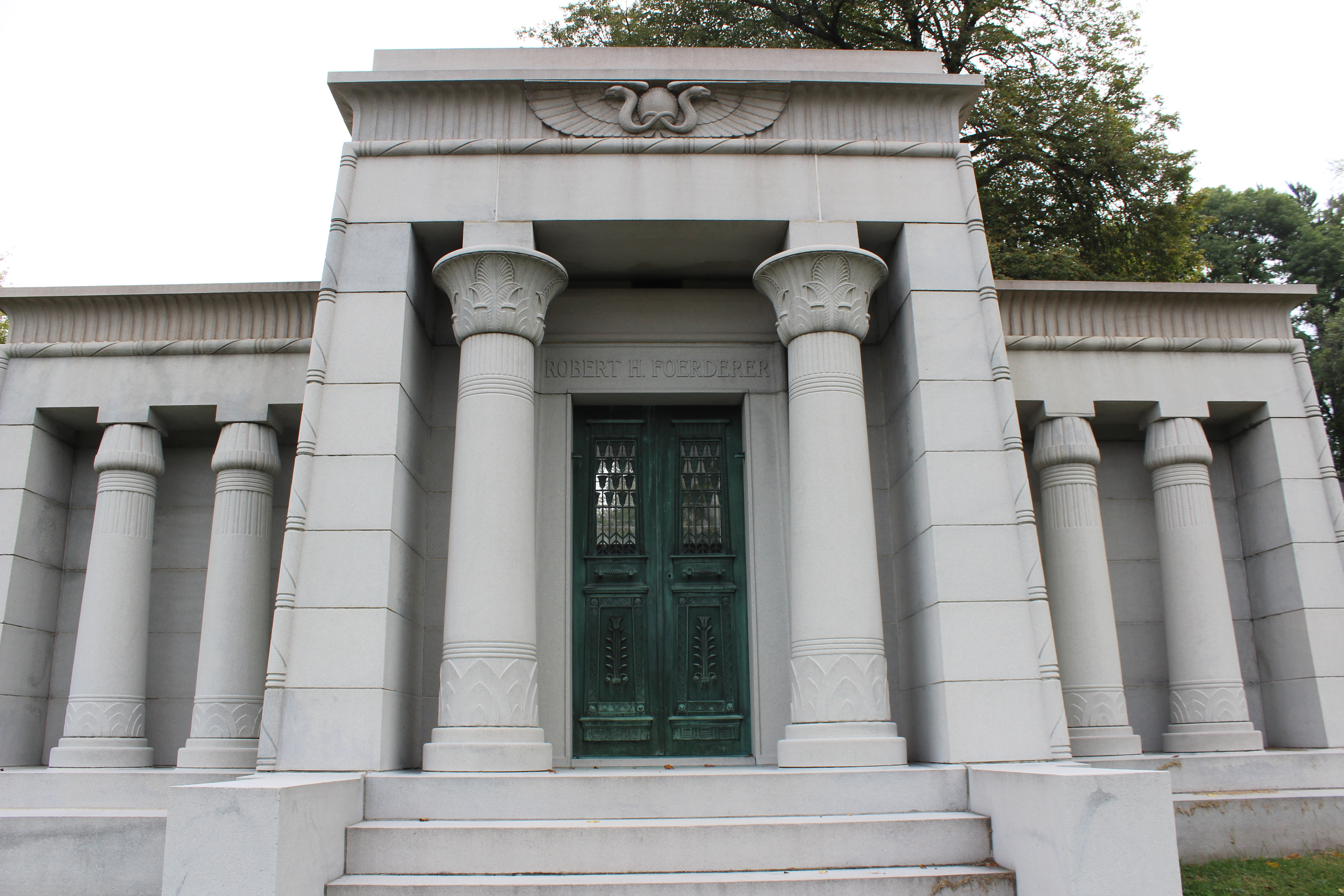
Robert H. Foerderer Mausoleum in Laurel Hill Cemetery

Foederer died in 1903 while in office at his home in Torresdale. He was interred in Philadelphia's Laurel Hill Cemetery. It is possible that he died from chromate poisoning from his years handling chromium for his chrome tanning technique although the cause of death was listed as Bright's disease.

Following Foerderer's death, Reuben Moon would be elected to fill his vacancy. Foerderer's son, Percival took over management of the leather goods business and is known for building the La Ronda mansion and estate in Bryn Mawr, Pennsylvania.

The Glen Foerd estate is currently operated as a historic house museum, and the grounds are a public park.

== See also ==
- List of members of the United States Congress who died in office (1900–1949)

== Citations ==
U.S. House of Representatives
Preceded by At-large: Samuel A. Davenport, Galusha A. Grow	Member of the U.S. House of Representatives from Pennsylvania's at-large congressional district 1901–1903 alongside: Galusha A. Grow	Succeeded by 29th: George Shiras III; 30th: John Dalzell
Preceded by James R. Young	Member of the U.S. House of Representatives from Pennsylvania's 4th congressional district 1903	Succeeded by Reuben O. Moon
