= Glen Foerd on the Delaware =

Historic house in Pennsylvania, United States

- Glen Foerd
- U.S. National Register of Historic Places
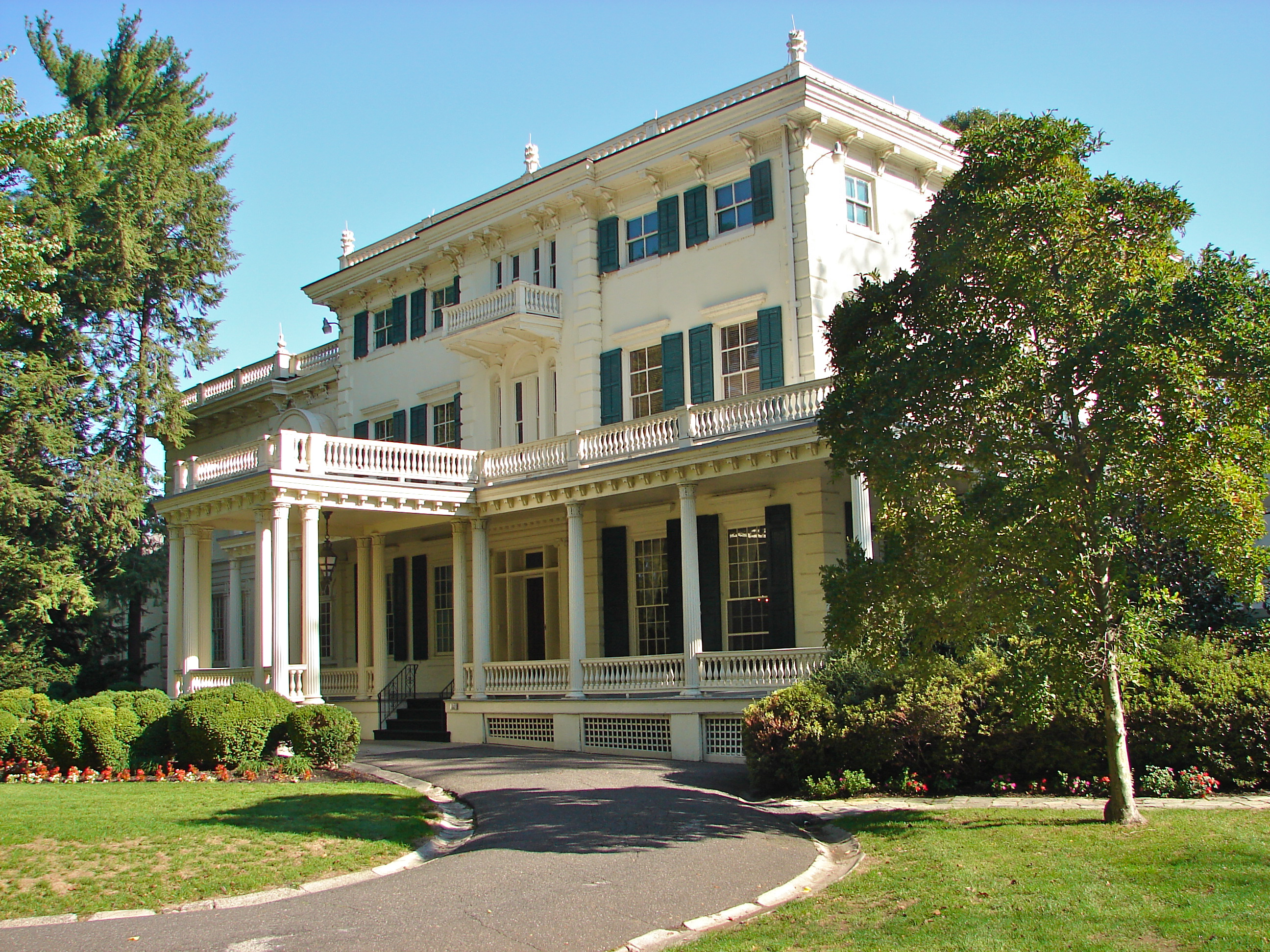

- Location within Philadelphia Location within Pennsylvania Location within the United States
- Location: 5001 Grant Ave., Philadelphia, Pennsylvania
- Coordinates: 40°03′06″N 74°58′44″W
- Area: 17.8 acres (7.2 ha)
- Built: 1850
- Architect: McAuley & Co.
- NRHP reference No.: 79002320
- Added to NRHP: November 20, 1979

Glen Foerd is a historic mansion and estate located in the Torresdale neighborhood of Philadelphia, Pennsylvania, overlooking the Delaware River near the mouth of Poquessing Creek.

Glen Foerd was listed on the National Register of Historic Places in 1979.

== History ==
The mansion, then named Glengarry, was built as a summer home about 1850 in the Italianate style by Charles Macalester Jr., a prosperous businessman and banker. Mr. Macalester became the trusted adviser of the eminent philanthropist George Peabody, and afterwards a trustee of his magnificent bequest to the cause of education in the Southern States. Mr. Macalester held close personal relations with U.S. Presidents Andrew Jackson, Martin Van Buren, James K. Polk, Franklin Pierce, James Buchanan, and Abraham Lincoln. From President Jackson, he received the appointment as one of the government directors of the Second Bank of the United States, and was serving in such capacity in 1836, when the charter of the bank expired (source needed).

In 1893, it was purchased by Robert H. Foerderer, a U.S. congressman and industrialist, who gave it its present name. He enlarged the house in 1903 in the Edwardian Classical Revival style. In 1971, the estate was given to the Lutheran Church of America. In 1985, Glen Foerd Conservation Corporation and the Fairmount Park Commission assumed ownership of the property.

Today, the estate is operated as a historic house museum, whose grounds are a public park.

In 2024, when Philadelphia was featured in the finale of Season 36 of The Amazing Race, Glen Feord Estate was featured as the season's finish line.

== See also ==
- List of parks in Philadelphia
