= John Lundy =

John Lundy may refer to

- John Egbert Lundy (1872–1949), Canadian politician
- John Patterson Lundy (1823–1892), American Episcopalian pastor
- John Silas Lundy (1894–1973), American physician and anesthesiologist
