= Reuben Moon =

American politician (1847-1919)

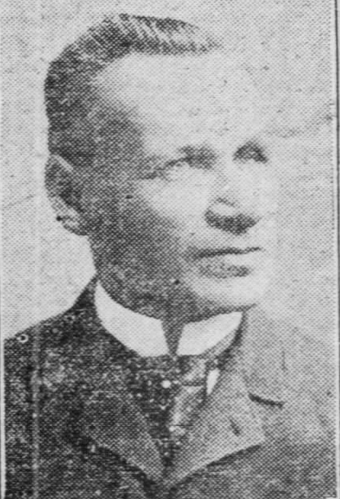

Member of the U.S. House of Representatives
- In office November 3, 1903 – March 3, 1913
- Preceded by: Robert H. Foerderer
- Succeeded by: George W. Edmonds
- Constituency: Pennsylvania's 4th district

Personal details
- Born: Reuben Osborne Moon; July 22, 1847 Jobstown, New Jersey, U.S.
- Died: October 25, 1919 (aged 72) Philadelphia, Pennsylvania, U.S.
- Resting place: West Laurel Hill Cemetery, Bala Cynwyd, Pennsylvania
- Party: Republican
- Education: National School of Oratory
- Occupation: lawyer, educator

Reuben Osborne Moon (July 22, 1847 – October 25, 1919) was an American politician who served as a Republican member of the U.S. House of Representatives for Pennsylvania's 4th congressional district from 1903 to 1913.

== Early life and education ==
Moon was born July 22, 1847, in the Jobstown section of Springfield Township, Burlington County, New Jersey, to Aaron Lippincott and Maria Braddock (Osborne) Moon. He graduated from the National School of Oratory in 1874.

== Career ==
He was a teacher in New Jersey, and became a professor at the National School of Elocution and Oratory. In 1880, after the death of the president of the school, he served as president. He studied law, and in 1884, was admitted to the bar in Philadelphia and began the practice of law. In 1886, he was admitted to the Supreme Court of Pennsylvania in 1889, to the Federal Courts in his district.

He was elected in 1903 as a Republican to the 58th Congress, by special election, to fill the vacancy caused by the death of United States Representative Robert H. Foerderer. He served as Chairman, Committee on Revision of the Laws in the 59th through 61st Congresses. He served on the Congressional Committee for the Codification of the Federal Statues and the United States House Committee on the Judiciary. He was an unsuccessful candidate for renomination in 1912.

He was a member of the Union League of Philadelphia and the Historical Society of Pennsylvania. He was one of the founders and president of the Columbia Club.

He died on October 25, 1919, in Philadelphia and was interred at West Laurel Hill Cemetery in Bala Cynwyd, Pennsylvania.

== Personal life ==
He married Mary A. Predmore in 1876 and together they had two children.

U.S. House of Representatives
Preceded by Robert H. Foerderer	Member of the U.S. House of Representatives from Pennsylvania's 4th congressional district 1903–1913	Succeeded by George W. Edmonds
