= Camp Happy (Philadelphia, Pennsylvania) =

Summer camp in Pennsylvania, United States

Coordinates: 40.050°N 75.000°W

Camp Happy was a summer camp designed to provide healthy nutrition and fresh air for the underprivileged children of Philadelphia. It was located on a large tract of land near the Delaware River, in Torresdale, Northeast Philadelphia.

== Origin of the idea ==
Conceived as an outgrowth of Jane Addams ideas about helping the poor, especially children, to receive food and healthcare. In the wake of the Influenza epidemic of 1918, the city of Philadelphia, Pennsylvania, authorized, in 1919, a Department of Recreation, with special provisions for establishing a children’s summer camp called Camp Happy.

== Site and facilities ==
In 1920, a plot of land was located on a large tract of land near the Delaware River, at the southwest corner of Linden and Torresdale Avenue, in Northeast Philadelphia, this was to be the location of Camp Happy, a camp designed to provide healthy nutrition and fresh air for the underprivileged children of Philadelphia.

The camp had an infirmary, a meeting hall, where movies were shown, a dining hall and separate swimming pools for girls and boys.

The children's street clothes were taken on arrival and stored in the attic of a barn, subsequently, they were issued uniforms, boys were issued canvas shorts and shirts, girls were issued pajama type jumpsuits with back flaps. Separate communal showers for boys and girls, hands were washed and teeth brushed in a communal porcelain water trough on the outside of the shower house. The stay was originally three weeks.

== Life in the camp ==
Initially, the population of the camp was multi-ethnic and multi-racial, by the time of its closing in 1951, it was homogeneous.

The daily regimen was militarized, standing in formation saluting the flag. The children slept on canvas cots under wool blankets in barracks that were compared to Nazi Stormtrooper barracks.

Each morning, the blankets were folded, the cots are taken outside and hosed down. The counselors and one was assigned to each barracks, were teens who exercised virtually unsupervised control and exercised discipline (often arbitrary and demeaning) over the children.

The occupants of each cabin were marched single file to the communal bathhouse to brush their teeth, then marched to the parade ground to line up and salute the flag. Then marched to the dining hall, for breakfast. Saying grace collectively, they sat down to eat breakfast that most enjoyed as it was better than they had at home.

The day followed with planned activities, which might include the swimming pool and movies.

In the early years of the camp, in the 1920s, the interaction and care by the counselors were educational and nurturing, but that deteriorated over time until by the 1950s the children felt they were prisoners, a feeling reinforced by having to wear uniforms. There were even escape attempts. Many campers felt more like prisoners and called it Camp Sad

== Post-war development and the end of Camp Happy ==
After World War II there was a spurt of economic growth, increased development in Torresdale, drove up demand for real estate, so in 1952 the camp was relocated to the Pocono Mountains. When the land was bought from Girard College for $25,000 and the camp was renamed, Camp William Penn. Its demise was facilitated by both the demand for land by developers and the bad press afforded it by the Philadelphia Daily News.
