= Samuel A. Davenport =

American politician and lawyer (1834–1911)

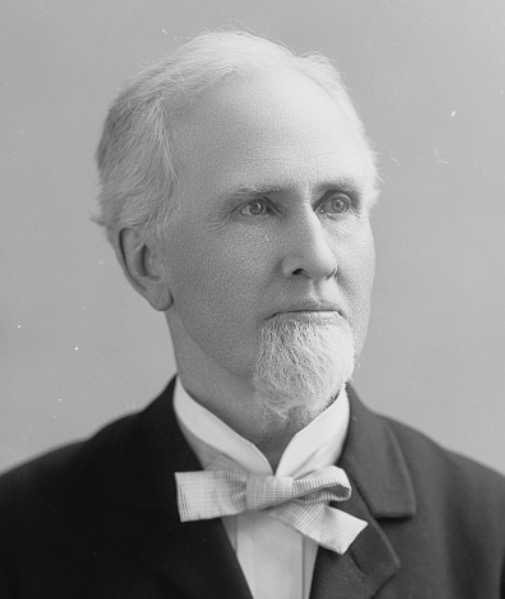
- Portrait of Davenport by Charles Milton Bell, taken between February 1894 and February 1901

Member of the U.S. House of Representatives from Pennsylvania's at-large district
- In office March 4, 1897 – March 3, 1901 Serving with Galusha A. Grow
- Preceded by: George F. Huff
- Succeeded by: Robert H. Foerderer

Personal details
- Born: Samuel Arza Davenport; January 15, 1834 Watkins Glen, New York, US
- Died: August 1, 1911 (aged 77) Erie, Pennsylvania, US
- Resting place: Erie Cemetery
- Party: Republican
- Occupation: Politician, lawyer

Samuel Arza Davenport (January 15, 1834 – August 1, 1911) was an American politician and lawyer. A Republican, he was a member of the United States House of Representatives from Pennsylvania.

== Biography ==
Davenport was born on January 15, 1834, near Watkins Glen, New York, the son of William Davenport and Phylance (née Tracy) Davenport. In 1839, he and his parents moved to Erie, Pennsylvania. Educated at the academy of Erie, Davenport read law was admitted to the bar in 1854. He graduated from Harvard Law School in 1855.

== Career ==
After graduating, Davenport began practicing law in Erie. In 1860, he was district attorney of Erie County. He owned and published the Erie Gazette from 1865 to 1890.

Davenport was a Republican. He was a delegate to the 1888 and 1892 Republican National Conventions. He was a member of the United States House of Representatives, from March 4, 1897, to March 3, 1901, representing the at-large district. He was not nominated for the following election. Ideologically, he leaned conservative.

After serving in Congress, Davenport returned to practicing law. He also participated in the Erie Car Works, a manufacturer of footwear and organs.

== Personal life and death ==
On December 30, 1862, Davenport married Kate Walker. He died on August 1, 1911, aged 77, in Erie, and was buried at Erie Cemetery.

U.S. House of Representatives
Preceded by George F. Huff	Member of the U.S. House of Representatives from Pennsylvania's at-large congressional district 1897–1901; Alongside Galusha A. Grow	Succeeded by Robert H. Foerderer
