= Red Lion Inn, Philadelphia =

Historic inn in Andalusia, Bensalem Township, Bucks County, Pennsylvania

Coordinates: 40.064°N 74.980°W

Castner, Samuel Jr. "Red Lion Inn. Torresdale, Pa." Free Library of Philadelphia (Scrapbook). Philadelphia, Pa.: Free Library of Philadelphia. Archived from the original on January 21, 2022.

The Red Lion Inn was a historic inn located near the Red Lion Bridge just outside Philadelphia in Andalusia, Bensalem Township, Bucks County, Pennsylvania, in the United States. The inn, the first public house in the area, was located on the King's Highway (now Bristol Pike) at the bridge across Poquessing Creek.

== History and architectural features ==
In 1730, Philip Amos petitioned the court to keep a public house of entertainment "near Poquessing creek, on the highway from Philadelphia to Bristol, that being The Red Lion Inn". Delegates to the First Continental Congress from Massachusetts dined there on their way to Philadelphia in 1774. John Adams was known to stop there on his travels to and from Philadelphia. The inn operated from about 1726 until December 1991, when it was destroyed by fire.

Many stories surround the inn as it was home to Henrietta, a companion who lived in the upstairs center room. The center room though that floor was not heated was always warmer than either adjoining room. Its interior went through many renovations over its lifetime, but many things were left unchanged such as the grand fireplace in the basement-level meeting room where many meetings were held during the Revolution. It was later known as a stop on the Underground Railroad.

General George Washington and the Continental Army camped along the Poquessing behind the Red Lion Inn on their way to Yorktown.

Just a few blocks away lies the John Hart Burial Yard, established in 1683, where some of the earliest settlers, including ancestors of Dr. Benjamin Rush, were laid to rest.
