= Kauffman & Minteer Inc. =

Kauffman & Minteer Inc. (K&M) was an industrial transportation company that operated from 1960 to 1981 in Burlington County, New Jersey. After cleaning their trucks, they dumped the waste water into a nearby lagoon that was not properly lined. The lagoon flooded and the waste water containing chemicals, migrated over to wetlands, causing damage to vegetation and seeping into underground drinking water. The Environmental Protection Agency (EPA) got involved in 1989 and conducted a few remediation attempts but the extent of the damage is hard to determine as the different underground pathways of water are unpredictable. The site is currently an active superfund site that is closely monitored by the EPA.

== Origins ==
Kauffman & Minteer Inc. (K&M) had 5 acres (2.0 ha) of land right off of County Route 537 in the Jobstown section of Springfield Township. There is a lagoon onsite and the land is surrounded by wetlands. (K&M) used the land to store their trucks that they used to transport chemicals.

=== Community history ===
Jobstown is a small community located in Springfield Township, Burlington County, New Jersey. Springfield Township was established on November 6, 1688, and is composed of 29.940 square miles of land and only about 0.061 square miles of water. The company was located in a rural area with the closest home 500 feet (150 m) away and a total of 184 homes within a 3-mile (4.8 km) radius.

=== Company history ===
Kauffman & Minteer inc. (K&M) transported a variety of bulk liquids including plasticizers, resins, vegetable oil, petroleum oil, organic chemicals and alcohols according to the New Jersey Department of Health. Even though (K&M) had a permit from the New Jersey Department of Environmental Protection (NJDEP), they failed to comply with many other rules and regulations. The company cleaned their vehicles and dumped the wastewater into the lagoon nearby which did not have a proper retention basin which is used as a storage area of excess water in case of a flood.

== Superfund designation ==
The NJDEP first issued an administrative order to have the waste water properly treated and removed offsite. Three years later they returned to see the progress and teamed up with the Burlington County health department. In 1984, the berm surrounding the lagoon broke and due to that the wastewater leaked out into the surrounding wetlands and it was calculated that the lagoon dropped 18 inches before they were able to fix the berm. A berm is a strip of land surrounding the lagoon that is above the water level. Once the berm broke, the Environmental protection agency (EPA) stepped in and conducted a study on site, which led to (K&M) being added to the National Priority List (NPL) on March 30, 1989.

=== State intervention ===
On June 2, 1978, the New Jersey Department of Environmental Protection (NJDEP) issued an administrative order to Kauffman & Minteer Inc. (K&M). The order required them to properly treat and then dispose of the wastewater on site, in agreement with the state's regulations and requirements. K&M was also given a discharge permit from the National pollution discharge elimination system that allowed them to relocate the waste to Barkers Brook which is a mitigation bank located close to the K&M superfund site in Springfield Township. K&M had to report the progress every year for the next five years. On April 13, 1981, the NJDEP went back to the K&M site and recorded that there was oil contamination in the lagoon and that there was debris in the surrounding area. In April 1982, K&M began relocating the wastewater and during the relocation, tests were conducted that showed significantly high levels of lead and calcium which were above the state's hazardous limit. After that, the NJDEP partnered with the Burlington County Health Department and conducted even more tests. On June 1, 1984, the berm of the lagoon broke and the wastewater rushed out of the lagoon into nearby wetlands that are very susceptible to damage due to chemicals. The Lagoon lost approximately 18 inches of water before the bern could be fixed. After this occurred, the Environmental Protection Agency (EPA) stepped in.

=== National intervention ===
A year after the berm broke, the Environmental Protection agency (EPA) performed a site inspection and deemed that this catastrophe met the criteria to join the National Priorities list (NPL) on March 30, 1989. The EPA performed more inspections in June 1989 and April 1991. The conditions remained the same from the first to the second site inspection.

== Health and environmental hazards ==
Throughout numerous studies conducted by the New Jersey Department of Environmental Protection (NJDEP), The Environmental Protection Agency (EPA) and the Burlington County Health department in New Jersey, a plethora of chemicals were discovered on and near the site of contamination. Concerned members of the community feared their water was contaminated, complaining that their water had a smell to it. However, multiple tests were conducted in three different wells varying in depths and resulted in no groundwater contamination. The only confirmed impact on the environment was the presence of sludge and oils covering the soil and nearby wetlands. The chemicals were not confirmed to have caused any harm to animals or people in the surrounding area.

=== Chemicals in lagoon ===
Tests showed that chemicals in the lagoon included bis(2-chloroisopropyl) ether 28 parts per billion (ppb), benzoic acid (200 ppb), trans-1,2-dichloroethene (260 ppb), tetrachloroethylene (170 ppb), toluene (120 ppb), ethylbenzene (750 ppb), styrene (470 ppb), xylenes ( 1,300 ppb), phenanthrene (6,200 ppb), di-n-butylphthalate (55,600 ppb), endosulfan sulfate (141 ppb), DDT (43 ppb), chlorotoluene (103 ppb), as well as some phthalates and unidentified chemicals. None of these chemicals have been confirmed to cause harm to people or animals in the surrounding area. Parts per billion is a measurement of quantity meaning that out of one billion particles found in a given area, only a certain amount of them are the contaminants.

=== Contaminants in soil ===
According to the New Jersey Department of Health “Contaminants detected in the sludges and sediments of the pit area in 1986 included di-n-octyl phthalate (77,000 ppb), di-n-butyl phthalate (790 ppb), xylenes (11,000 ppb) ethylbenzene (9,800 ppb), 1,1,1-tri-chloroethane (12,000 ppb), and numerous unidentified compounds.” According to the EPA, “The only contaminant-related ecological impact observed was to some flora in the lagoon-fed marsh. This stressed area was an isolated section adjacent to the lagoon. Obvious signs of phytotoxicity and adverse impacts were yellow, withered vegetation, and vegetation stained black from the overflow of lagoon contents.” In other words, the only impact on the environment observed was staining of vegetation, causing it to be yellow, black, or brown due to the different metals and chemicals that the wetlands were exposed to.

=== Volatile chemical ===
The only volatile organic compound found in the water was trichloroethylene at 24 ppb. The Discovery of this chemical in the water was in 1984 and it was in such a low quantity that Kauffman & Minteer Inc. (K&M) could not have been held accountable because the presence of this chemical was most likely due to another source such as a septic tank. According to the Agency for Toxic Substances and Disease Registry, trichloroethylene can be harmless in very small quantities and very harmful in large quantities. The effect it has on people also depends on the person's age, sex, lifestyle, state of health, and family traits. Trichloroethylene can cause scleroderma which is a systemic autoimmune disease that causes joint pain, skin stiffness, and heartburn. In animals, exposure to trichloroethylene can impact the liver, nervous system, kidneys, and blood. Trichloroethylene at 24 ppb is in such a small quantity that it did not have harmful affects on people and animals in the nearby area of the contamination site.

== Clean-up ==
=== Initial clean-up ===
The Environmental Protection Agency (EPA) conducted several cleanup procedures between 1991 and 1998. They removed 656,000 gallons of water from the lagoon and properly disposed of it. They also removed 17,500 tons of contaminated soil from the area and build protective fencing surrounding the contaminated site. To add to that, they performed on-site treatment of wastewater and contaminated soil by injecting chemical oxidants in an effort to clean up the site in a long term manner.

=== Current site status ===
According to the location map (Superfund Site location map on the National Geographic website, accessed on September 27, 2017), Kauffman & Minteer Inc. (K&M) is still currently an active superfund site. Although many remediation actions have been conducted and there have been no reports of further contamination, the site is still closely monitored by the Environmental Protection Agency.
