= John Patterson Lundy =

John Patterson Lundy (Danville, Pennsylvania, February 3, 1823 - Philadelphia, December 11, 1892) was an American Episcopal priest and writer. Following his education at Princeton University and Princeton Theological Seminary, he was ordained a Presbyterian minister, but then became an Episcopal priest. During his diaconate, he was chaplain of Sing Sing prison. He became rector of All Saints' Episcopal Church (Philadelphia); Emmanuel Church of Holmesburg, Pennsylvania; Christ Church, Reading; and Church of the Holy Apostles (Manhattan). Due to poor health, he left this position and went to Saranac Lake for the winter of 1877-78, where he held well-attended services at the Berkeley House, a hotel and sanitorium.

== Works ==
- Monumental Christianity, Or, the Art and Symbolism of the Primitive Church 1876
- A Review of Bishop Hopkins' Bible View of Slavery, by a Presbyter of the Church in Philadelphia
- The Saranac Exiles
