= Torresdale, Philadelphia =

Torresdale
- Neighborhood of Philadelphia
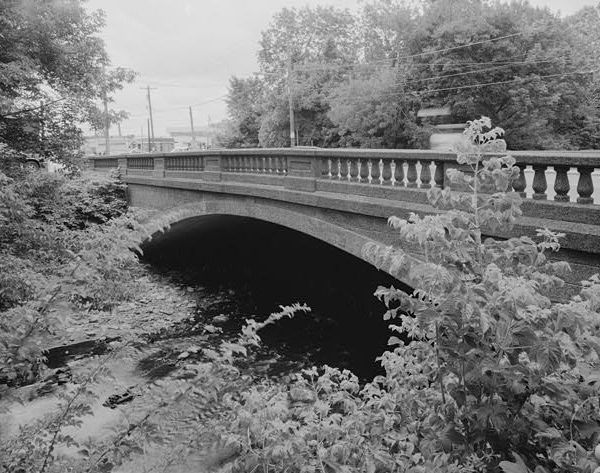
- The Frankford Avenue bridge over the Poquessing Creek bordering Torresdale

- Location within Philadelphia
- Country: United States
- State: Pennsylvania
- County: Philadelphia County
- City: Philadelphia
- ZIP: 19114
- Area codes: 215, 267 and 445

Torresdale, also formerly known as Torrisdale, is a neighborhood in the Far Northeast section of Philadelphia, Pennsylvania, United States. Torresdale is located along the Delaware River between Holmesburg and Bensalem Township in neighboring Bucks County.

The adjacent confluence of the Poquessing Creek with the Delaware River had been favored by William Penn's surveyor, Thomas Holme, as the site for the city that Penn planned to found. Although a more southerly site was finally selected, Holme and others acquired property there, where he is buried.

== History ==
Torresdale, originally Torrisdale, was named by Charles Macalester for his family's ancestral Scotland home.

Before the Act of Consolidation, 1854, Torresdale had been part of Delaware Township of Philadelphia County, and before 1853, part of Lower Dublin Township of the same county.

In 1894, Torresdale was the site of the regatta of the Rowing Association of American Colleges.

Long before the existence of what is referred to today as the Philadelphia Main Line, Torresdale, along with Holmesburg to its south and Andalusia to its north, had been Philadelphia's posh suburban neighborhood, as evidenced by Glen Foerd on the Delaware, a luxurious riverside estate and Andalusia, the Biddle estate, for which the village of Andalusia is named.

== Notable sites ==
Torresdale is the site of Holy Family University and Nazareth Academy High School.

The Union League Golf Club at Torresdale, a Donald Ross–designed golf course, located at Frankford and Grant Avenues, is one of the finest golf courses in the Philadelphia region. In 2015, the Union League of Philadelphia undertook a complete restoration of the course and historic clubhouse, which drew significant national attention.

The Frankford Avenue Bridge over Poquessing Creek is listed on the National Register of Historic Places.

Camp Happy (Philadelphia, Pennsylvania) a camp for underprivileged children open from 1920-1951.

All Saints' Episcopal Church was established in 1772.

Eden Hall Chapel, built in 1849 as part of the former Convent of the Sacred Heart, was demolished in 2007.

The municipal Baxter Water Treatment Plant opened in 1909 as the Torresdale Water Treatment Plant.

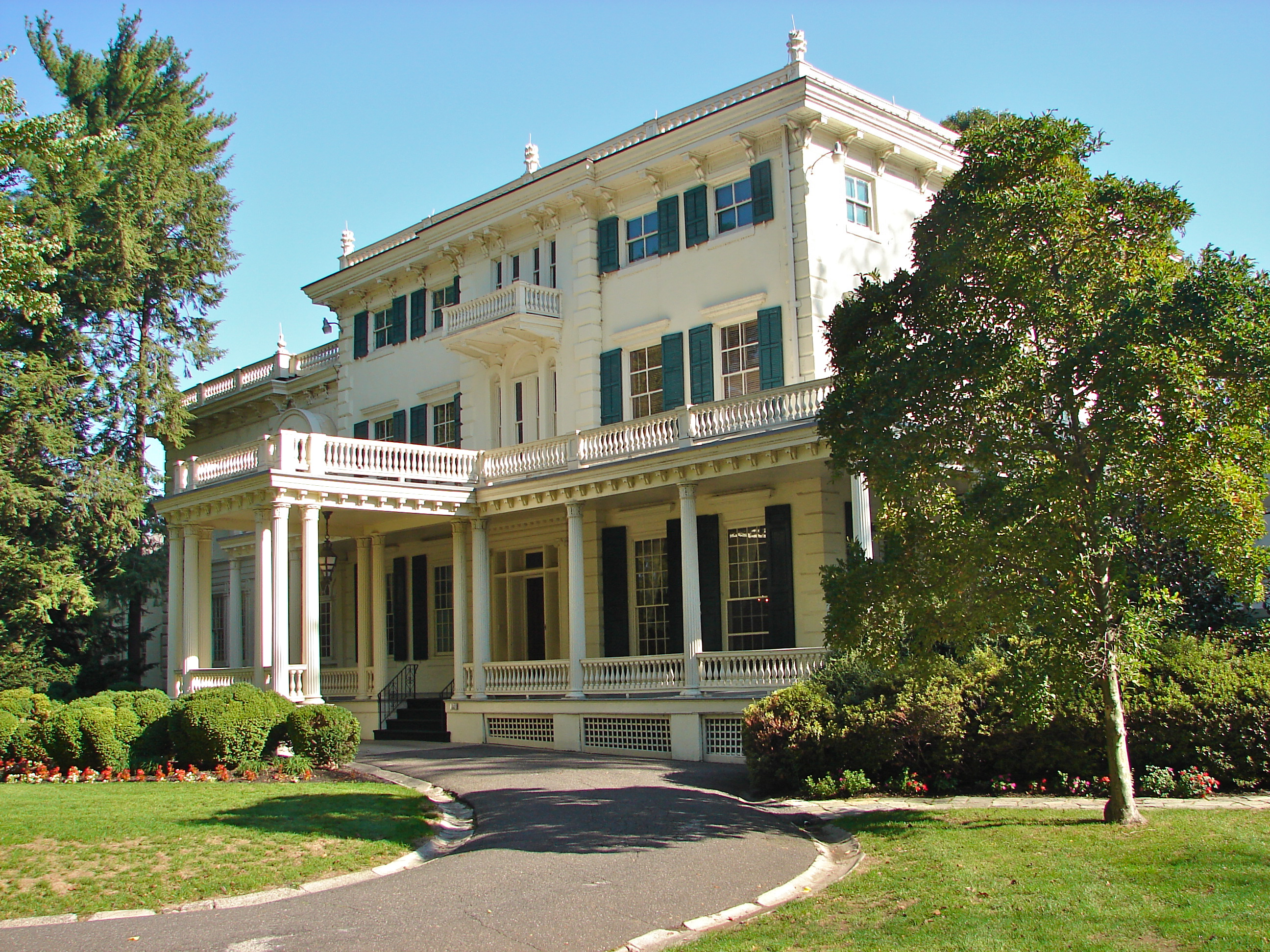
Glen Foerd on the Delaware was added to the National Register of Historic Places in 1979

Glen Foerd on the Delaware is a historic estate established in 1850, listed on the National Register of Historic Places and the Historic American Landscapes.

== Education ==
Residents are zoned to schools in the School District of Philadelphia, including Thomas Holme Elementary School, Austin Meehan Middle School, and Abraham Lincoln High School.

== Notable people ==
- Gia Carangi (1960-1986), model
- Boake Carter (1903-1944), national news commentator
- Francis Anthony Drexel (1824-1885), banker and philanthropist
- Katharine Drexel (1858-1955), Roman Catholic saint
- Michael Driscoll (born 1960), Philadelphia City Councilmember
- Edwin Henry Fitler (1825-1896), businessman and 75th mayor of Philadelphia
- Robert H. Foerderer (1860-1903), U.S. Congressman and businessman
- Virginia Knauer (1915-2011), politician
- William J. Green, III (born 1938), politician
- William J. Green Jr. (1910-1963), U.S. Congressman
