= Jobstown, New Jersey =

Populated place in Burlington County, New Jersey, US

- Census-designated place
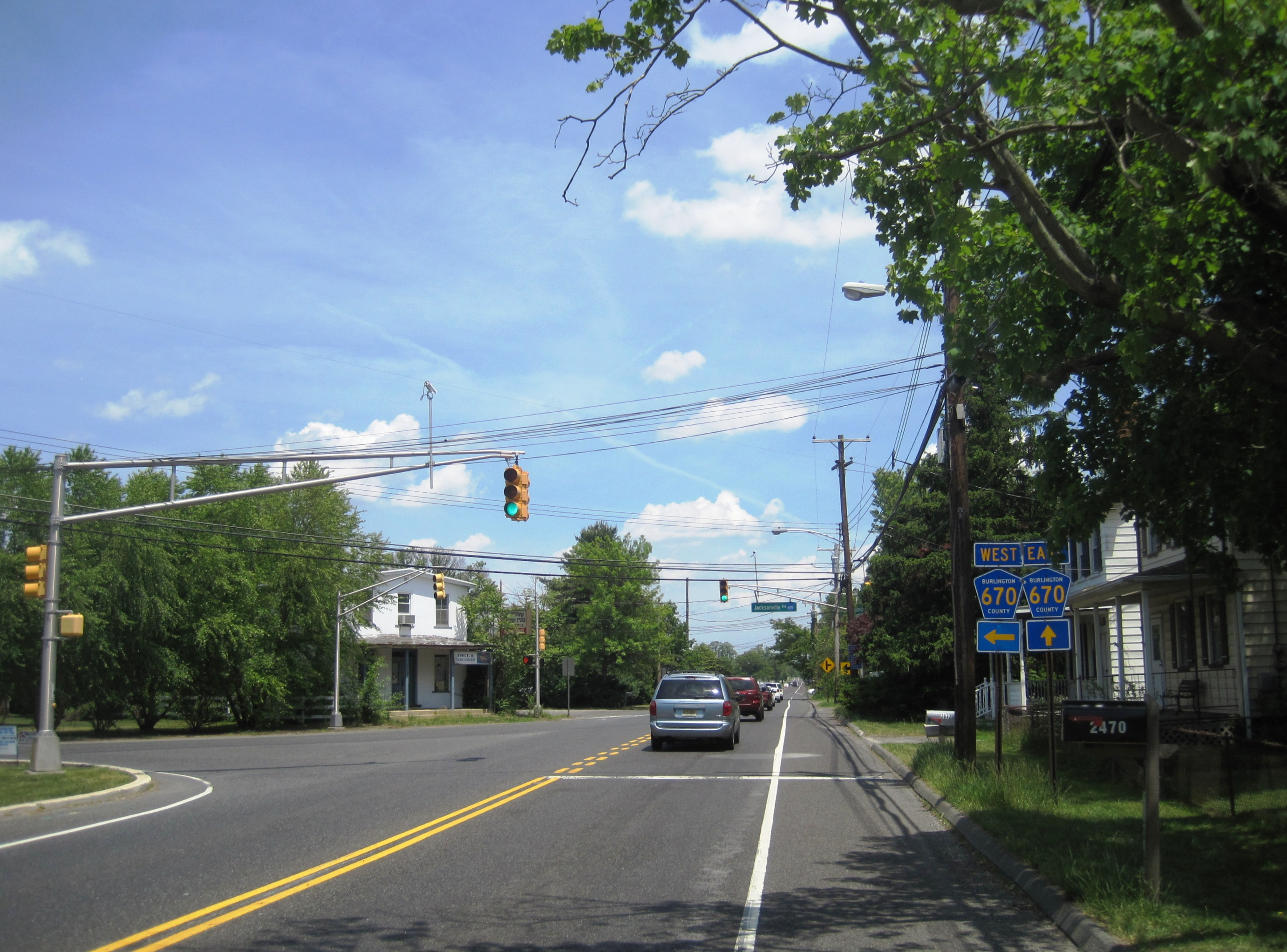
- Center of Jobstown at CR 537 and CR 670

- Location in Burlington County Location in New Jersey Location in the United States
- Coordinates: 40°02′13″N 74°41′35″W
- Country: United States
- State: New Jersey
- County: Burlington
- Township: Springfield

Area
  - Total: 3.29 sq mi (8.51 km^{2})
  - Land: 3.28 sq mi (8.50 km^{2})
  - Water: 0 sq mi (0.00 km^{2})
- Elevation: 72 ft (22 m)

Population (2020)
  - Total: 369
  - Density: 112/sq mi (43.4/km^{2})
- Time zone: UTC−05:00 (Eastern (EST))
  - Summer (DST): UTC−04:00 (EDT)
- FIPS code: 34-36120
- GNIS feature ID: 877462

Jobstown is an unincorporated community and census-designated place (CDP) located within Springfield Township in Burlington County, in the U.S. state of New Jersey. As of the 2020 census, Jobstown had a population of 369. The area is served as United States Postal Service ZIP Code 08041.

County Route 537 is the main route through Jobstown. CR 670 also comes through the community with a short concurrency with CR 537. Rancocas Stable was an American thoroughbred horse racing stable and stud farm located in Jobstown. Redwing Airport is a general aviation airport located 1 mile (1.6 km) south of the central business district. Other places in Jobstown include a post office, churches, Springfield Township municipal offices and park, and small businesses. Jobstown was once a stop on the Kinkora Branch railroad.

== Demographics ==
Historical population
Census	Pop.	Note	%±
2020	369		—
U.S. Decennial Census

Jobstown was first listed as a census designated place in the 2020 U.S. census.

Jobstown CDP, New Jersey – Racial and ethnic composition Note: the US Census treats Hispanic/Latino as an ethnic category. This table excludes Latinos from the racial categories and assigns them to a separate category. Hispanics/Latinos may be of any race.
Race / Ethnicity (NH = Non-Hispanic)	Pop 2020	2020
White alone (NH)	289	78.32%
Black or African American alone (NH)	19	5.15%
Native American or Alaska Native alone (NH)	1	0.27%
Asian alone (NH)	7	1.90%
Native Hawaiian or Pacific Islander alone (NH)	3	0.81%
Other race alone (NH)	0	0.00%
Mixed race or Multiracial (NH)	27	7.32%
Hispanic or Latino (any race)	23	6.23%
Total	369	100.00%

As of 2020, the area had a population of 369.

== Education ==
Its school districts are Springfield Township School District (elementary) and Northern Burlington Regional School District (secondary school).

== Notable people ==
People who were born in, residents of, or otherwise closely associated with Jobstown include:

- Irving Fryar, former NFL wide receiver
- Reuben Moon (1847–1919), politician who represented Pennsylvania's 4th congressional district from 1903 to 1913

== See also ==
- Kauffman & Minteer Inc.
