= Redwing Airport =

Coordinates: 40°01′35.404″N 074°41′33.57″W

- IATA: none; ICAO: none; FAA LID: 2N6

Summary
- Airport type: Public use
- Owner: Central Jersey R.W. Inc.
- Operator: George P. Dengler
- Serves: Jobstown, New Jersey
- Location: Burlington County, New Jersey
- Elevation AMSL: 75 ft / 23 m

Map
- Interactive map of Redwing Airport

Runways
Direction	Length		Surface
Direction	ft	m	Surface
06/24	1,830	558	Turf
11/29	1,590	485	Turf

Statistics (2010)
- Aircraft operations: 4,500
- Based aircraft: 15
- Source: Federal Aviation Administration

Redwing Airport (FAA LID: 2N6) is a public-use airport located one nautical mile (1.852 km) south of the central business district of the Jobstown area of Burlington County, New Jersey, United States, The airport is privately owned.
