= Delaware Expressway =

The Delaware Expressway is a freeway in the U.S. state of Pennsylvania. It follows:

- Interstate 95 from the Delaware state line to Bristol Township.
- Interstate 295 from Bristol Township to the New Jersey state line.
