= Byberry Creek =

Byberry Creek is a 6.0-mile-long (9.7 km) tributary of Poquessing Creek in northeastern Philadelphia, Pennsylvania in the United States.

Byberry Creek is formed from two branches that flow through Northeast Philadelphia, Wilsons Run and Waltons Run.

- Waltons Run, the western stream, flows across land of the Northeast Philadelphia Airport.
- Wilsons Run, the eastern stream, is sometimes considered a continuation of the main stream Byberry Creek.

The two tributaries join to form the main channel of Byberry Creek near Academy Road adjacent to Archbishop Ryan High School as seen in aerial images of the area at coordinates 40.086609°N 74.984436°W.

Byberry Creek joins Poquessing Creek approximately one mile before the confluence with the Delaware River.

== See also ==
- List of rivers of Pennsylvania
