= All Saints' Episcopal Church (Philadelphia) =

Coordinates: 40.05871°N 74.99577°W

All Saints' Torresdale Episcopal Church
- All Saints' Torresdale Episcopal Church
- Location: 9601 Frankford Avenue (Route 13), Philadelphia, Pennsylvania
- Country: United States
- Denomination: Episcopal
- Website: http://www.allsaintstorresdale.org/

Philadelphia Register of Historic Places

History
- Founded: 1772

Architecture
- Architect: Frank Wills
- Style: Gothic
- Groundbreaking: 1854
- Completed: 1855
- Construction cost: $13,500

Specifications
- Materials: stone

Administration
- Province: Three
- Diocese: Pennsylvania

Clergy
- Rector: The Reverend Jay Walton

All Saints' Torresdale Episcopal Church is an Episcopal church in the Torresdale neighborhood of Philadelphia, Pennsylvania. The church was founded in 1772, asan extension of Philadelphia's Old Trinity Church. The present church building, designed by Frank Wills, was completed in 1855.

The church reported 399 members in 2016 and 180 members in 2025. Plate and pledge income reported for the congregation in 2025 was $131,513. Average Sunday attendance (ASA) in 2025 was 90 persons. This was a relative decrease from ASA of 138 persons reported in 2015.

== History ==
During the late 17th century, Church of England services were the first religious services to be held at the site of what is, today, All Saints' Torresdale Episcopal Church. First conducted in 1698, they were held in a Quaker meeting house built from hewn logs. Replaced by a brick building in 1711, the structure was further improved with the addition of pews in 1759, eventually became known as the Old Trinity Church, and remains situated in what is now Oxford Township, Pennsylvania.

By the early 1770s, however, a group of congregants came to realize that their beliefs were not completed aligned with other members of their church, and decided to begin a search for another more suitable location to worship. Writing to the Propagation of the Gospel in London on behalf of those restive congregants in 1771, Dr. William Smith secured permission to build a new facility, found land roughly five miles away in Torresdale, an area in Philadelphia County which would become part of the city of Philadelphia in 1854, and began working to make the new church a reality. Groundbreaking was held on November 3, 1772, on land provided by Christian Minnick, the building was completed, and dedication ceremonies were held on November 3, 1772. "Included in the covenant of ground from Christian Minnick," according to historians at All Saints' Episcopal, "was a stipulation that the church was not to be separated from Trinity Oxford and that the Swedish minister was to preach in it every three weeks."

== Rectors ==
- 1772-1779 Dr. William Smith
- 1779-1785 No Rector
- 1785-1786 William Smith (not Dr. Smith)
- 1786-1791 Joseph Pilmore
- 1791-1798 Dr. William Smith and others
- 1798-1799 John Henry Hobart
- 1799-1802 no regular Rector
- 1802-1804 Charles Cotton
- 1804-1805 No Rector
- 1805-1806 Mr. Nankevil
- 1806-1809 James Abercombie
- 1809-1816 James Wiltbank
- 1816-1818 No Rector
- 1818-1834 George Sheets
- 1834-1878 Frederick Beasley
- 1878-1879 No Rector
- 1879-1882 John Magruth
- 1882-1886 James Bassett
- 1886-1907 Rush S. Eastman
- 1907-1916 Allen Van Meter
- 1916-1953 Percy Brown
- 1953-1960 Stuart Thomas
- 1960-2003 Dr. Edward Chinn
- 2004-2009 Jeffrey Liddy
- 2010-2012 Stephen Snider (interim rector)
- 2012–2016 Dr. Bradley Hauff
- 2020–present Jay Walton
