= Charles Macalester =

American businessman, banker and philanthropist (1798–1873)

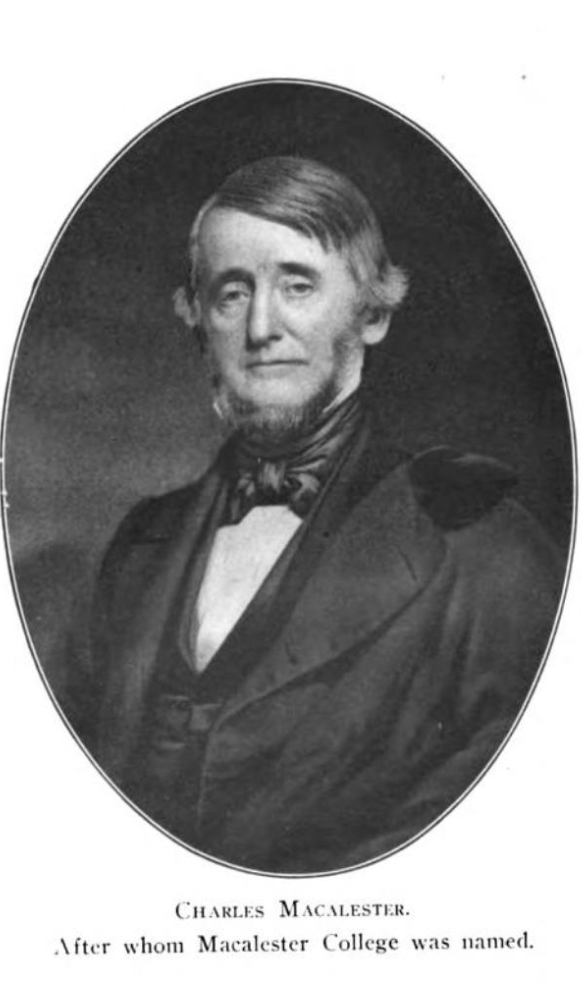
- Born: February 17, 1798; Philadelphia, Pennsylvania, U.S.
- Died: December 9, 1873 (aged 75)
- Burial place: Laurel Hill Cemetery, Philadelphia, Pennsylvania, U.S.
- Occupations: Merchant, banker, real estate investor, philanthropist

Charles Macalester (February 17, 1798 – December 9, 1873) was an American businessman, banker and philanthropist from Philadelphia, Pennsylvania. He served as a government director for the Second Bank of the United States and an advisor and friend to several U.S. presidents. His brokerage and financing activities made him one of the wealthiest people in the United States at the time. He bequested a former hotel property to a failing Presbyterian secondary school in Saint Paul, Minnesota that became Macalester College and was named in his honor. His Glengarry estate in the Torresdale neighborhood of Philadelphia was added to the National Register of Historic Places in 1979.

== Early life and education ==
Macalester was born in Philadelphia on February 17, 1798, to immigrant parents from Scotland. His father was a ship-master who sailed often to the East Indies and Europe. Macalester was educated at Grey & Wylie's school and the University of Pennsylvania. While at university, he led a company of forty students to assist in the construction of a fort on the west bank of the Schuylkill River during the War of 1812.

== Career ==
From 1821 to 1827, he worked as a merchant in Cincinnati, Ohio, before returning to Philadelphia. On August 24, 1832, his father died and Macalester inherited a large estate. Macalester retired as a merchant in 1849, but continued buying and selling securities and real estate.

He worked for the stock brokerage firm Gaw, Macalester & Co., was an agent for the American-British financier George Peabody, a director of the Fidelity Insurance, Trust & Safe Deposit Co., a director of the Girard National Bank and a director of the Camden & Amboy Railroad Company. He made real estate investments, especially in Chicago, and was one of the wealthiest people in the United States.

In the 1830s, he was appointed as government director for the Second Bank of the United States by Andrew Jackson and served in that capacity when the bank charter expired. He was an advisor and friend to several U.S. Presidents including James Buchanan, Millard Fillmore, Ulysses S. Grant, Andrew Jackson, Abraham Lincoln, Franklin Pierce, James K. Polk and Martin Van Buren. He was offered a cabinet post several times but never accepted.

In 1850, Macalester purchased 84 acres of land in the Torresdale neighborhood of Philadelphia and built a grand country estate that he named Glengarry.

== Philanthropy ==
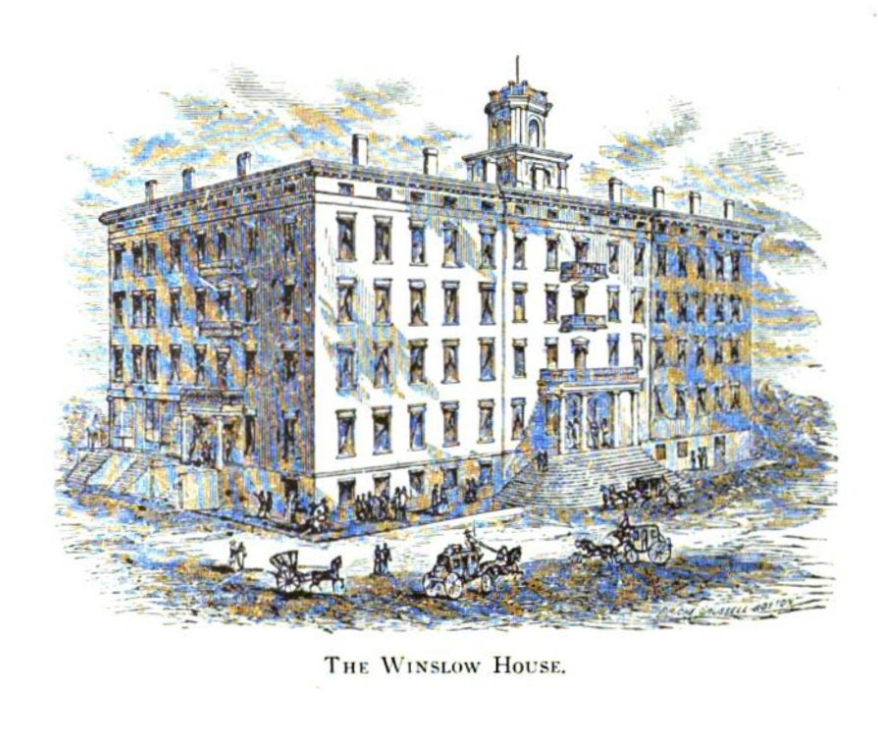
Macalester donated the Winslow House in Minneapolis to be used as the first building of Macalester College

In the 1870s, Rev. Dr. Edward Duffield Neill asked Macalester for sponsorship for the failing Baldwin College in Minnesota. J. Macalester bequested the Winslow House, a summer hotel in Minneapolis which overlooked Saint Anthonys Falls. Neill agreed to rename the school Macalester College in honor of the gift and the college was chartered in 1874. In 1885, the college sold the Winslow House property for $40,000 and moved to its present location, on Snelling Avenue at Grand Avenue in St. Paul, Minnesota.

He was a trustee of the Presbyterian Hospital of Philadelphia, the Jefferson Medical College and the Peabody Southern Education Fund. He served as president of the St. Andrew's Society.

== Personal life ==
He was first married in Cincinnati, Ohio in 1824 to Eliza A. Lyttle and together they had two children. He was married again in 1841 to Susan Wallace.

== Death and legacy ==
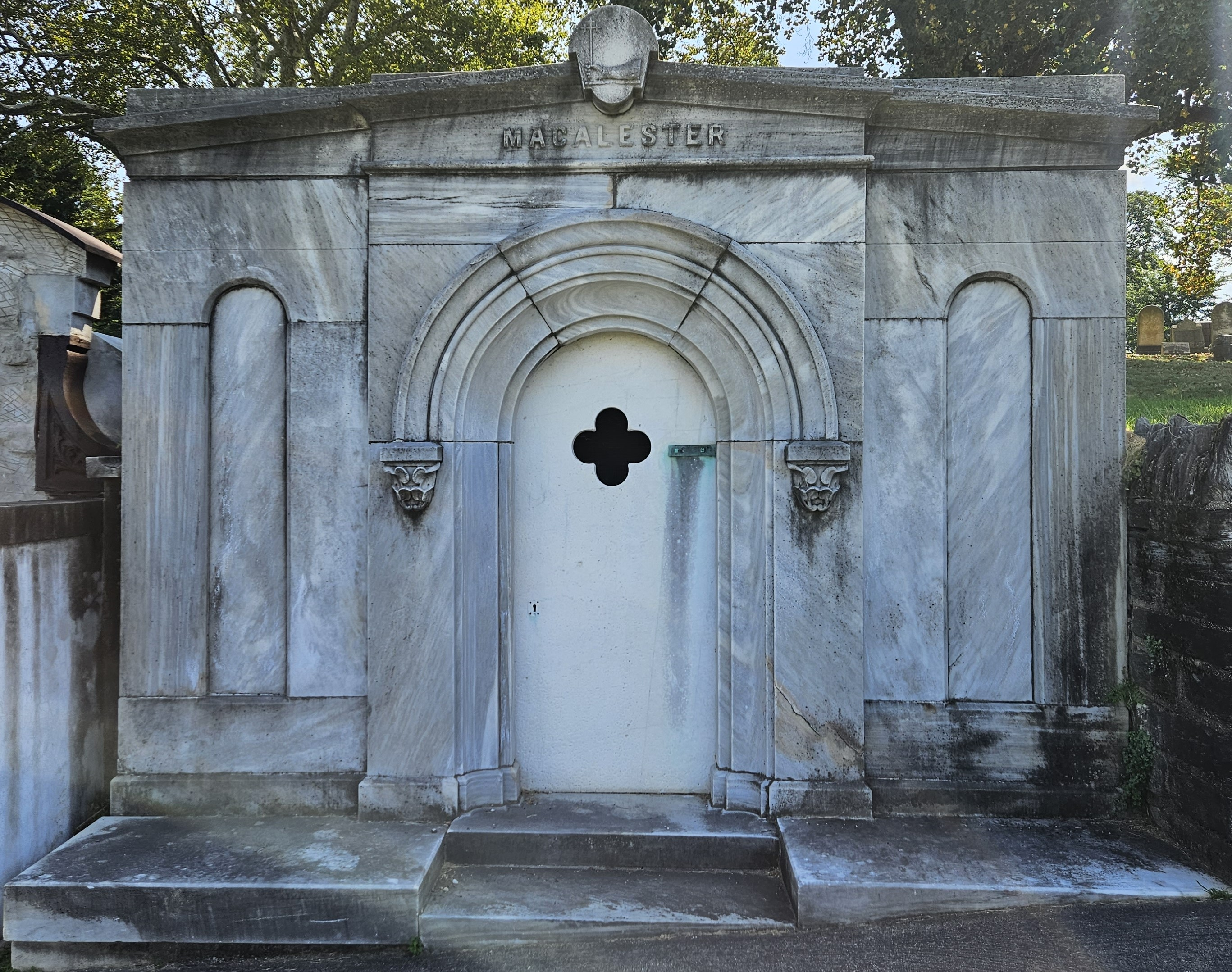
Charles Macalester's mausoleum in Laurel Hill Cemetery

He died at his Glengarry estate in the Torresdale neighborhood of Philadelphia on December 9, 1873. He was interred in a mausoleum at Laurel Hill Cemetery, Philadelphia, in Section 10, Lot 45.

In his will, he bequeathed $5,000 for Presbyterian missions, $5,000 for the Presbyterian Board of Education, and $5,000 for the Fund for Disabled Ministers of the Presbyterian church. The name of Baldwin College was changed to Macalester College in honor of his donation of the Winslow Hotel which founded the school. He also left other charitable bequests.

The Charles Macalester Society at Macalester College was named in his honor and set up to recognize individuals whose lifetime donations to the school have exceeded $1 million.

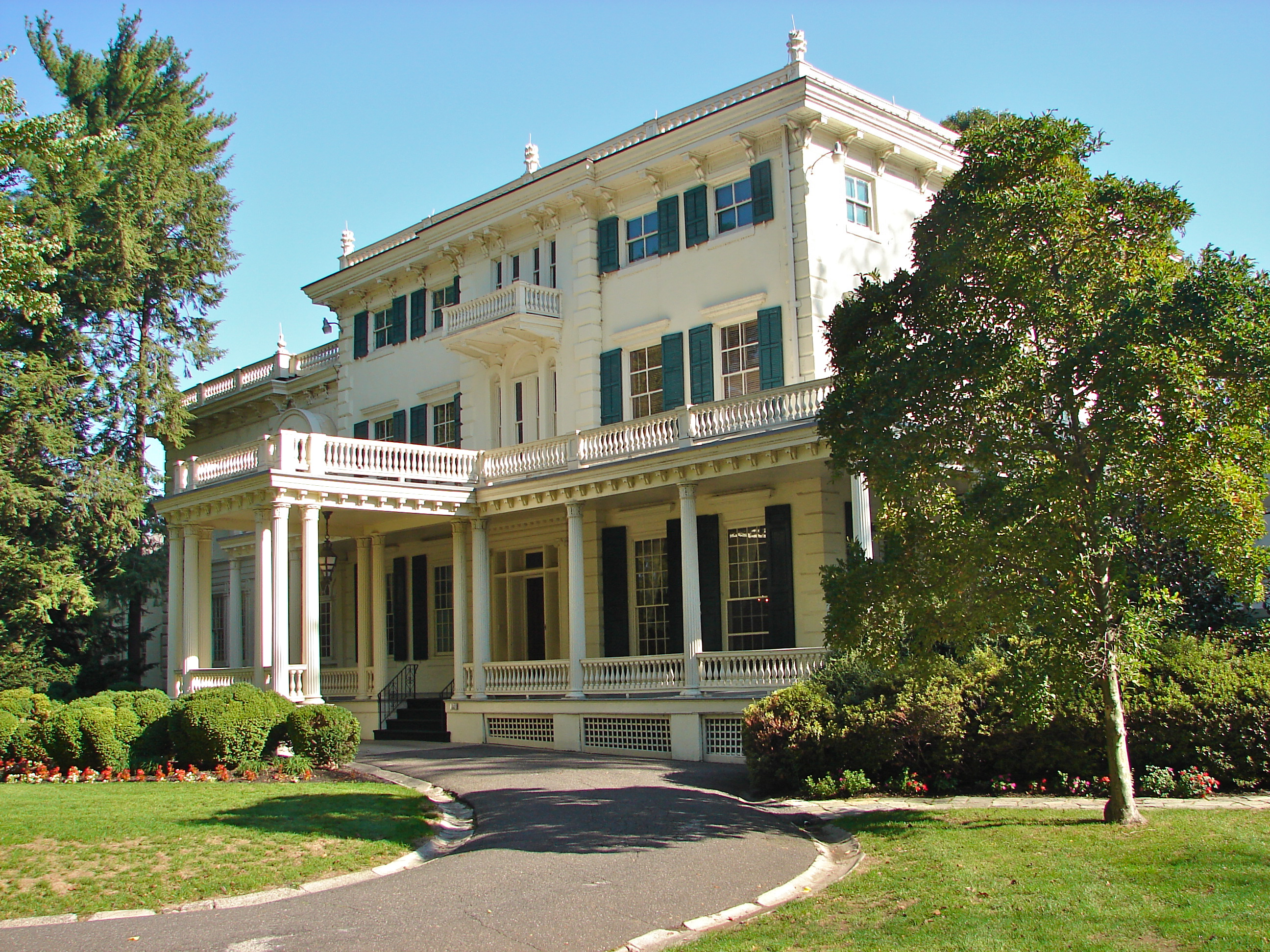
Macalester's Glengarry estate (later renamed Glen Foerd on the Delaware) was added to the National Register of Historic Places in 1979

His Glengarry estate in the Torresdale neighborhood of Philadelphia was added to the National Register of Historic Places in 1979.
