= Poquessing Creek =

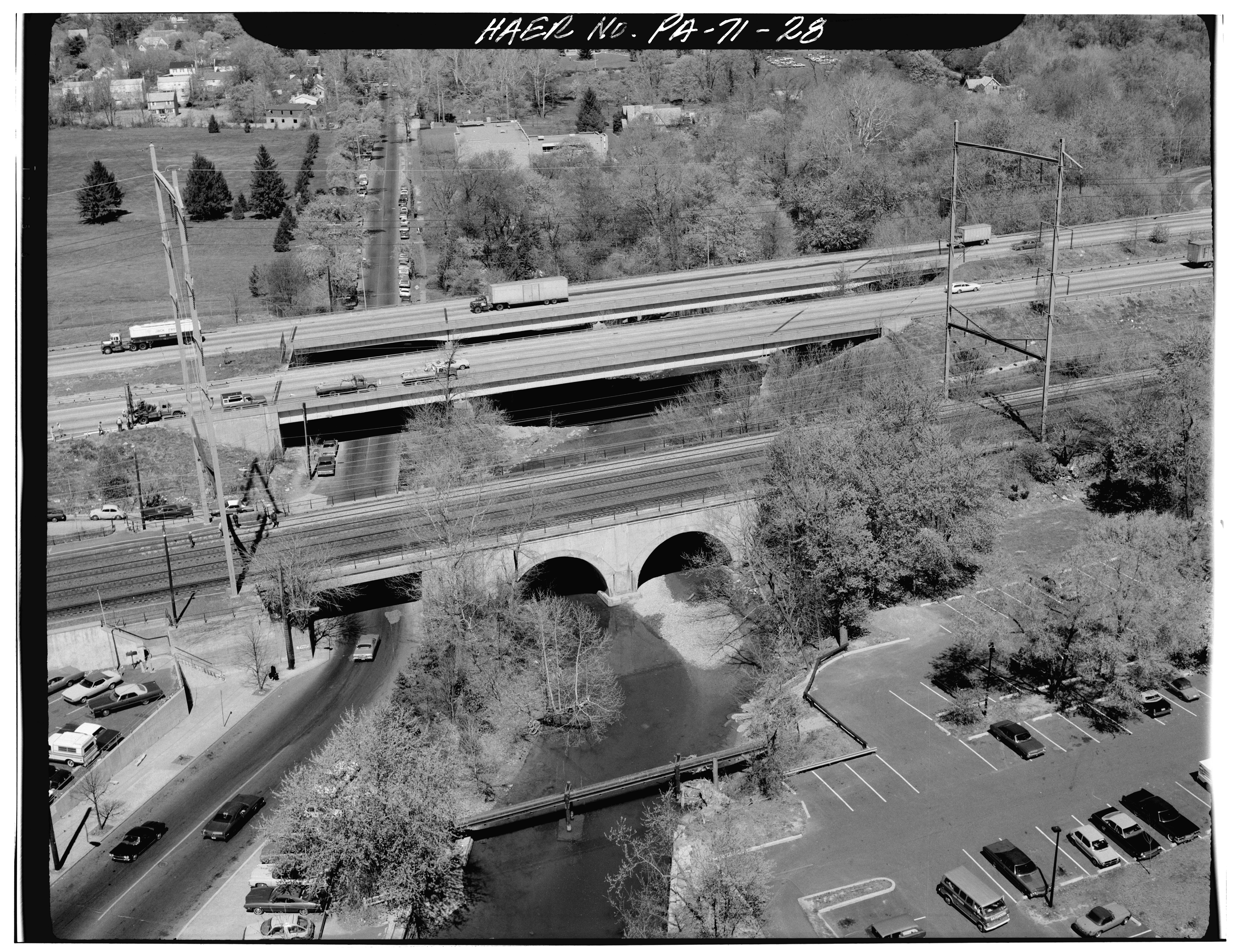
Interstate 95 and Amtrak Northeast Corridor Bridges crossing over the creek

Poquessing Creek is a 10.3-mile-long (16.6 km) creek, a right tributary of the Delaware River, that forms the boundary between Philadelphia and Bensalem Township, which borders it to the northeast along the Delaware. It has defined this boundary between Bucks and Philadelphia counties since 1682.

The creek arises in Trevose and meanders to the southeast before emptying into the Delaware River. The name Poquessing comes from the Lenape "Poetquessnink", meaning "place of the mice". The mouth of the Poquessing on the Delaware was first proposed as the site for William Penn's Philadelphia, and for many years the surrounding area was known as "Old Philadelphia".

The Poquessing drains an area of approximately 21.5 square miles (56 km^{2}) in Philadelphia, Montgomery, and Bucks counties, including portions of the municipalities of Philadelphia, Upper Southampton, Lower Southampton, Lower Moreland, and Bensalem.

Poquessing Creek and its tributaries have largely escaped the "channelization" process that has transformed significant portions of other watercourses in the city into storm sewers, as the map at this site discloses. This sewerization process had been used in the past to allow land to be leveled and filled in order to preserve the traditional, regular rectangular grid of streets and property lines so common to the city. By the 1930s this process was seen as creating many problems.

During the late 1950s, housing in new developments was built with curving through-streets that conformed to the natural topography, avoiding the need to fill or level the terrain. The Morrell Park neighborhood was the first in Philadelphia to follow this new pattern, avoiding for years any development near the stream valley of Byberry Creek, which flows through and about the neighborhood before its confluence with the Poquessing (though later years saw development much closer to the stream than originally envisioned). Channelization of the Poquessing affected only a tiny unnamed creek below Grant Avenue near Fluehr Park.

Though Byberry Creek and its two branches, Wilsons Run and Waltons Run, remain free-flowing, their entire courses are owned and operated by the city as an integral part of the city's storm sewer system, and are so marked on city departmental maps. Despite this circumstance, they have natural courses during low water flows.

== Geology ==
Poquessing Creek starts out flowing on a bedrock of felsic gneiss, from the Cambrian, consisting of quartz. microcline, pyroxene, and biotite, buff to pink color and fine to medium grained.

Then it flows into a region of the Wissahickon Formation, from the Paleozoic, a schist, a metamorphic rock containing garnet, staurolite, kyanite, and sillimanite. Varieties include oligoclase-mica schist.

As the Poquessing passes along the border between Philadelphia and Bucks County, the Pennsauken and Bridgeton Formations, from the Tertiary, consisting of quartz sand, overlie the Wissahickon Formation, but the creek has eroded below these formations to flow along the Wissahickon Formation.

Then, the last few hundred yards (meters) before emptying into the Delaware River, it flows through the Trenton Gravel formation, from the Quaternary, consisting of reddish-brown gravely sand and silt.

== Tributaries ==
- Black Lake Run
- Bloody Run
- Byberry Creek
- Colberts Run
- Elwoods Run
- Waltons Run
- Wilsons Run

== Historic bridges ==
- Frankford Avenue Bridge
- U.S. National Register of Historic Places
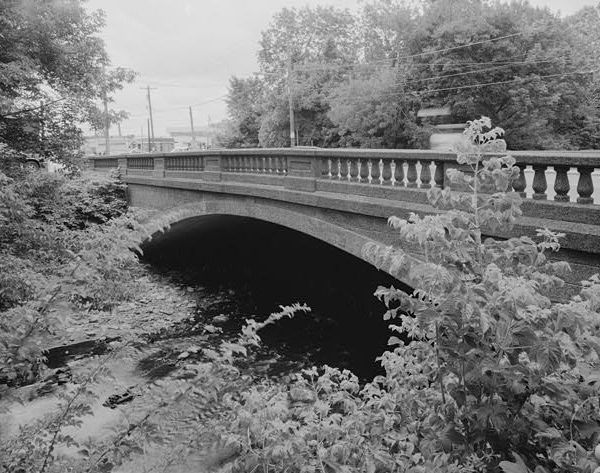
- Frankford Avenue bridge over the Poquessing Creek

- Location within Pennsylvania
- Location: Philadelphia, Pennsylvania
- Coordinates: 40°03′54″N 74°58′52″W
- Built: 1904
- Architect: John McMenamy
- MPS: Highway Bridges Owned by the Commonwealth of Pennsylvania, Department of Transportation TR
- NRHP reference No.: 88000850
- Added to NRHP: June 22, 1988

Several historic bridges cross the Poquessing.

- A two-span, closed-spandrel, stone arch bridge, built in 1805, originally carried the King's Highway, later the Byberry and Bensalem Turnpike. It was improved in 1917 to carry the new Lincoln Highway but was bypassed by the Roosevelt Boulevard in 1921. It is open to pedestrian traffic only.
- A three-span stone arch bridge, built in 1845, carrying Red Lion Road near the site of the old Red Lion Inn is still in use.
- A two-span, closed-spandrel, stone arch bridge at Richlieu Road, built in 1840, is no longer in use.
- A two-span, 42 ft-long (13 m), closed-spandrel, stone arch bridge at Century Lane, built in 1853 to connect the villages of Mechanicsville (now part of Philadelphia) and Elizabethtown, remains in use.
- A single-span concrete arch bridge where Frankford Avenue meets Bristol Pike (both U.S. Route 13), built in 1904, is notable for its early modern use of concrete. It was listed on the National Register of Historic Places in 1988 and remains in use today.
- A 19th-century four-arch stone bridge carries Amtrak's Northeast Corridor rail line (originally Pennsylvania Railroad) over the Poquessing and Grant Avenue in Philadelphia. The span over Grant Avenue has been improved to a concrete deck arch.

== Quotation ==
From The History of Philadelphia's Watersheds and Sewers compiled by Adam Levine, Historical Consultant, Philadelphia Water Department:

- Poquessing Creek rises in Montgomery County, crosses the north-west line of the late township of Byberry, where it receives a branch which flowed mainly through Moreland. It there bends northward into the county of Bucks, again southward, when it touches the township line, and flows south-east and south-west, forming the boundary line of Byberry, and turning to the south-east enters the Delaware.—Bloody run empties into it at Carter's mill, Black Lake creek at Mechanicsville, and Gilbert's run about a mile below.—Elwood's run and Wilson's run, which rise in Byberry township, unite to form Byberry creek, which enters the Poquessing near the Red Lion tavern.—Colbert's run and Walton's run unite and form Walton's creek, which flows into the Byberry. The latter meets the Poquessing within a mile of where it enters the Delaware River. On Lindstrom's map this stream is called Pouquessinge, La Riviere de Kakimon's. Mr. Henry defines Kakamon's to be a name for the pike, so that this was Pike creek; but Peder Lindstrom also has upon his map Drake Kylen, La Riviere des Dragons, or Dragon River. Johan Campanius calls it Drake Kylen. In a patent to Nicholas Moore it is called Poetquessingh, and on Holmes' map, Potquessin.

== See also ==
- List of parks in Philadelphia
- List of Pennsylvania rivers
