= Moreland Township, Pennsylvania (disambiguation) =

Moreland Township, Pennsylvania is a township in Lycoming County.

Moreland Township may also refer to:

- Moreland Township, Philadelphia County, Pennsylvania, a defunct township that was located in Philadelphia County
- Moreland Township, Montgomery County, Pennsylvania, a defunct township that was located in Montgomery County

== See also ==
- Lower Moreland Township, Montgomery County, Pennsylvania
- Northmoreland Township, Wyoming County, Pennsylvania
- Upper Moreland Township, Pennsylvania
- Westmoreland County, Pennsylvania
