= Byberry =

Byberry may refer to:

- Byberry, Missouri
- Byberry, Philadelphia
