= Upper Moreland High School =

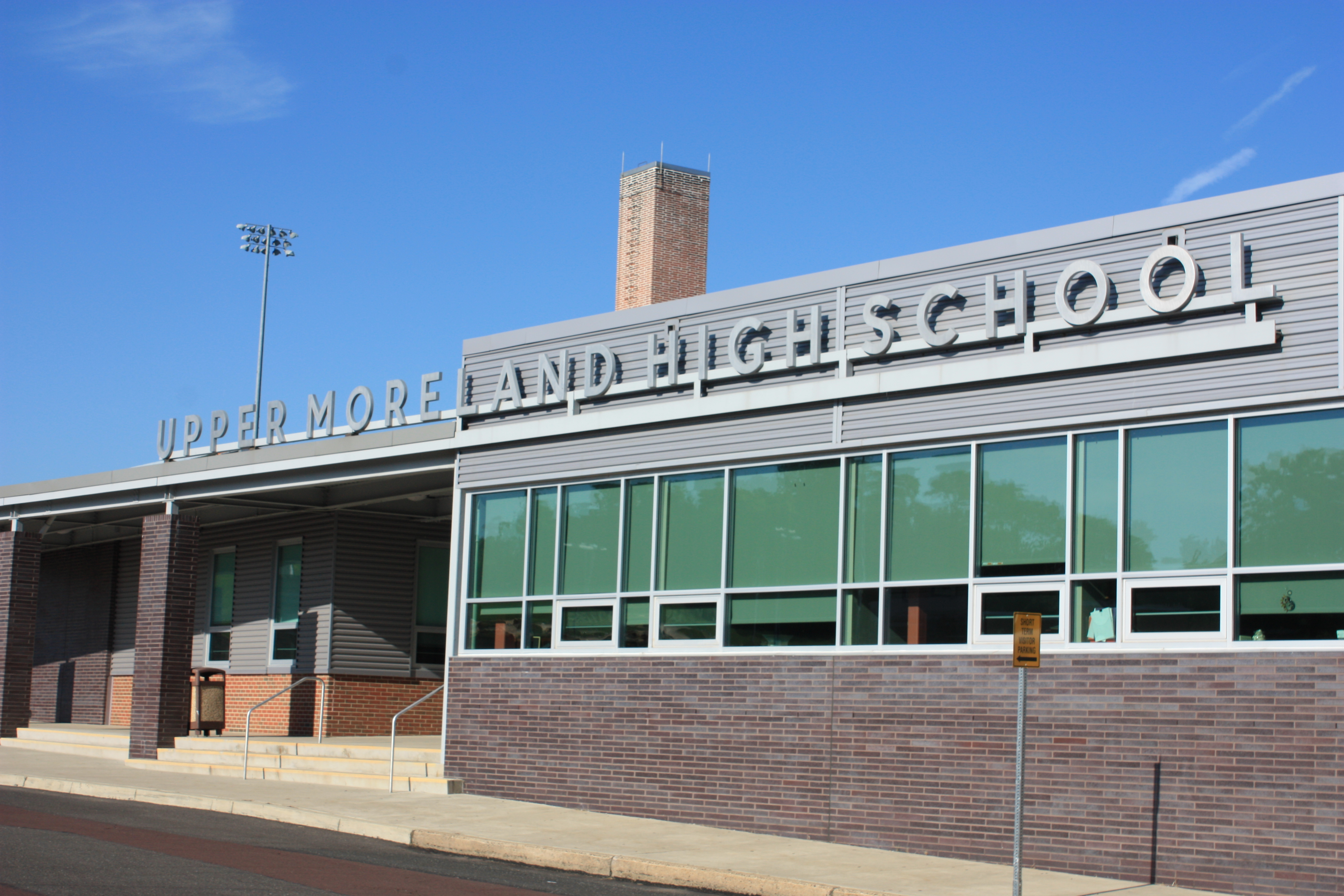

Location
- 3000 Terwood Road; Willow Grove, PA 19090-1431
- Coordinates: 40°09′21″N 75°06′33″W

Information
- Type: Public
- School district: Upper Moreland School District
- Principal: Joshua Levinson
- Staff: 82.50 (FTE)
- Grades: 9–12
- Student to teacher ratio: 12.45
- Colors: Purple & Gold
- Athletics: Sean Feeley
- Athletics conference: Suburban One League
- Mascot: The Golden Bear
- Rival: Hatboro-Horsham Senior High School
- Website: Official website

Upper Moreland High School is a comprehensive public high school, serving grades 9–12, located in Willow Grove, Pennsylvania, about fifteen miles outside of Philadelphia. It is the only high school in the Upper Moreland School District, which includes parts of the Huntingdon Valley, Hatboro, and Willow Grove ZIP codes in Upper Moreland Township. Its primary feeder school is Upper Moreland Middle School, and routinely sends graduates to colleges and universities in the United States and worldwide.

== Location/Geography ==
Upper Moreland High School, abbreviated UMHS, serves grades 9–12. Its current building, which was erected in 1958, sits at 3000 Terwood Road in Willow Grove, directly adjacent to the Warminster Line of SEPTA Regional Rail (but is not served by a station), and its campus includes the school district's administration building and bus garage. Construction was completed on a three-level science wing in 2009, and air conditioning has been installed, as the school sits diagonally across the street from the Upper Moreland-Hatboro Joint Sewer Authority treatment plant on Terwood Road. It also sits directly across Terwood Rd. from Eastern Center for Arts and Technology, formerly known as Eastern Montco Vo-Tech School.

== Notable alumni ==
- Paul Bateman, mathematician
- Jill Biden, Ed. D., former First Lady of the United States
- Stewart Greenleaf, Pennsylvania state senator
- Scott Hilton, former professional football player, San Francisco 49ers
- Joanna Sampson, artistic gymnast
