= Scott Hilton (American football) =

American football player (born 1954)

No. 55
- Position: Linebacker

Personal information
- Born: May 28, 1954 (age 72); Harrisburg, Pennsylvania, U.S.
- Listed height: 6 ft 4 in (1.93 m)
- Listed weight: 230 lb (104 kg)

Career information
- High school: Upper Moreland (Willow Grove, Pennsylvania)
- College: None

Career history
- Philadelphia Eagles (1977–1978)*; San Francisco 49ers (1979–1980)
- * Offseason or practice squad member only
- Stats at Pro Football Reference

Scott Hilton (born May 28, 1954) is an American former professional football linebacker who played two seasons with the San Francisco 49ers of the National Football League (NFL).

== Early life ==
Scott Hilton was born on May 28, 1954, in Harrisburg, Pennsylvania. He played high school football at Upper Moreland High School in Willow Grove, Pennsylvania. Hilton was heavily recruited out of high school but chose to go to work as a carpenter instead. He later enrolled at Salem College on a football scholarship in January 1973 but left the school before playing for the team.

== Professional career ==
Hilton played for the semi-pro Somerton All Stars, in the Philadelphia area.

Hilton signed with the Philadelphia Eagles on April 22, 1977, after impressing the team with his 6'4", 220 pound frame and 4.7 second 40-yard dash time at a tryout camp. However on July 25, 1977, Hilton left the Eagles to return to his job as a carpenter. Eagles head coach Dick Vermeil was disappointed with his decision, stating "I thought he was making a mistake. The thing I feel bad about was that he's the guy who's going to be disappointed. He's never experienced the excitement of playing pro football or college football. All he's experienced is the hard work. His chances were 25-75, but he owed it to himself. Hell, you can always hammer a nail." Hilton signed with the Eagles again the next year on May 14, 1978. He was released on August 22, 1978.

Hilton signed with the San Francisco 49ers on May 2, 1979. He played in seven games, all starts, for the 49ers during the 1979 season before being placed on injured reserve on November 2, 1979. He played in 13 games, starting eight, during the 1980 season and recovered one fumble. Hilton was released by the 49ers on August 18, 1981.
