= Somerton, Philadelphia =

- Neighborhood
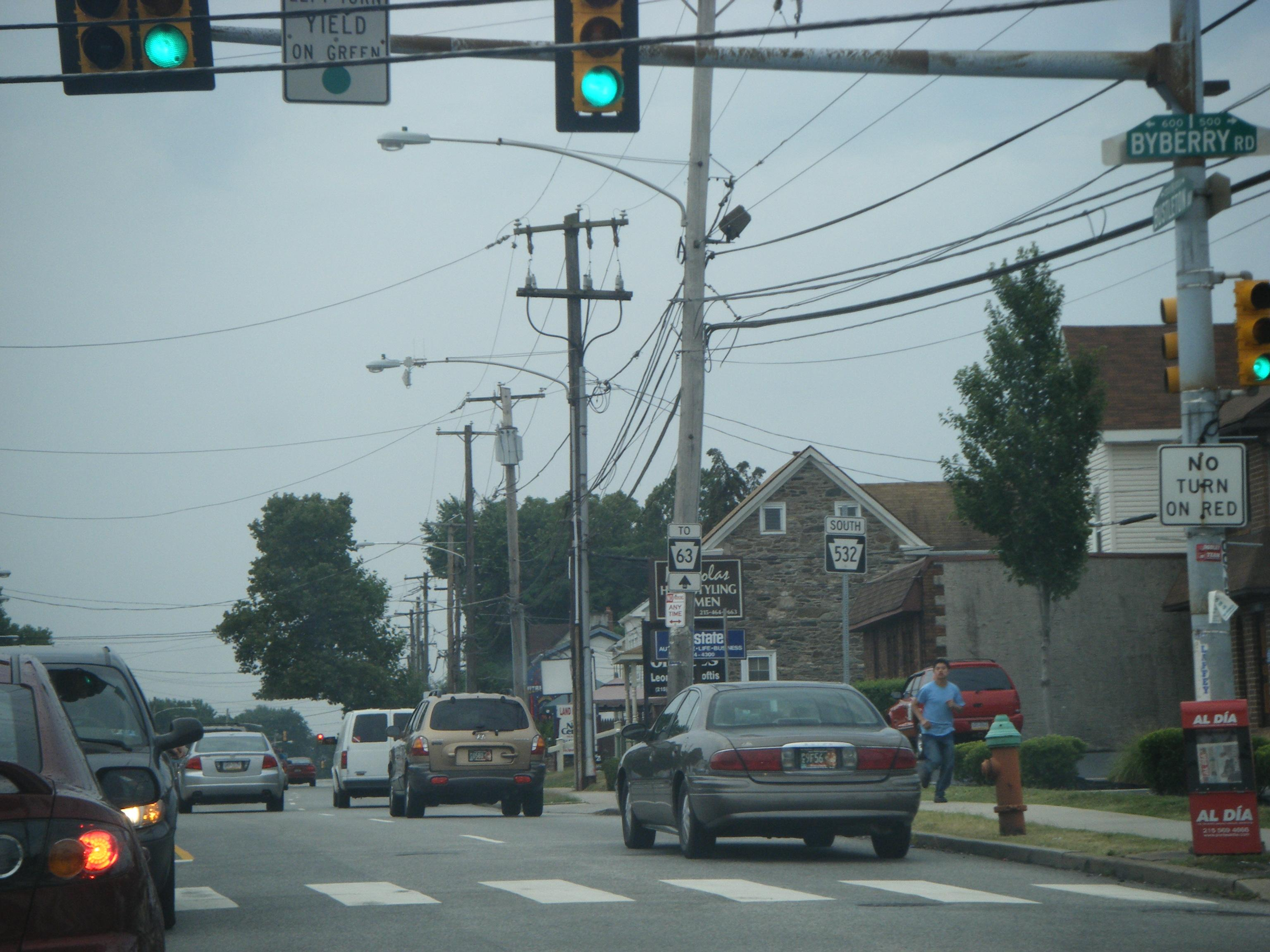
- Bustleton Avenue at the intersection with Byberry Road in Somerton

- Location within Philadelphia
- Coordinates: 40°07′26″N 75°00′29″W
- Country: United States
- State: Pennsylvania
- County: Philadelphia
- City: Philadelphia
- Zip code: 19116
- Area codes: 215, 267

Somerton is a neighborhood in the Far Northeast section of Philadelphia, Pennsylvania, United States. The neighborhood is bounded by Red Lion Road on the south, Roosevelt Boulevard on the east, East County Line Road and Poquessing Creek on the north, and the Philadelphia County / Montgomery County line on the west. Somerton is adjacent to the Philadelphia neighborhoods of Bustleton, Normandy, and Byberry, the townships of Bensalem and Lower Southampton in Bucks County, and Lower Moreland Township in Montgomery County. The area is home to a large and fast-growing foreign-born population, most notably of Russian, Ukrainian, Indian, and Central Asian immigrants.

The United States Postal Service operates the Somerton Postal Store at 669 Hendrix Street; however, all mail for the 19116 ZIP code is delivered by the Bustleton Post Office, located at 9925 Bustleton Avenue in Bustleton.

The neighborhood is served by the Forest Hills and Somerton SEPTA regional rail stations and SEPTA bus routes 58 and 84.

== History ==
Somerton was originally called Smithfield, a village in Moreland Township, Philadelphia County, Pennsylvania. Somerton was named for state senator Jacob Sommer.

The Somerton name appeared as the name of the local post office in 1830, though some maps in the 1840s continued to show the place name as "Smithfield or Somerton". By the 1850s, maps showed the area solely as Somerton.

== Neighborhoods and subdivisions ==
Old Somerton, generally north of Byberry Road consists of many larger pre-1900 as well as newer mid-sized homes.

Londontown is a small section of Somerton between the Short Line train tracks on Southampton Road and Carter Road.

Tudor Village consists of the area west of Southampton Road, west of the train tracks, and east of Worthington Road. Most of the houses were constructed by an Estonian man named Uno Kallaste, who left a street bearing his surname. Streets in Tudor Village bear the names of his family members, notably Ina (pronounced EE-na) Drive, named after Uno's wife.

Lumar Park is an area one mile south of Somerton, west of Bustleton Ave, north of Tomlinson Rd, south of the line of the proposed Woodhaven Road, built in 1950-1951. Somerton Terrace, is just south of Lumar Park, built in 1952-1954. The ground for these homes was owned by the Roberts family. The upper end blocks of the 500 blocks of Selma and Burgess Streets, near Bustleton Pike, had several homes built in the 1920s.

Brentwood, built in 1958 (up to 1960 for Barlow Street and Stevens Road), lies east of Bustleton Avenue, south of the line of Woodhaven Road, and north of Lorraine Gardens.

Lorraine Gardens, built in 1950-1951 is south of Brentwood, north of Tomlinson Road and east of Bustleton Avenue.

Westwood, built in 1966-1967, is an area south and west of the intersection of Bustleton and Byberry Roads.

Philmont Heights, built in 1970-1972, is generally south and west of Lumar Park. Isidore Strittmuller's farm, as well as the land of George Snyder, was developed into this area.

Camelot is a subdivision north and west of Red Lion Road and Haldeman Ave.

Georgetown is on the north side of Tomlinson Road, west of the Somerton Tank farm. Georgetown twins were much larger than the twins or many duplexes of Philmont Heights. Original sample homes built by Korman, in 1967; the remainder were built in 1969. The area is Tomlinson Road, Greiner Road, Rennard Street, Larkspur Street, Gardner Street, Regina St, Marita Street, amongst others.

Timberwalk, built in 1986, located east of George Washington High School.

Somerton is home to Philadelphia's Somerton Tank Farms (tanks built 1954-1955), an experiment in urban farming.

The Budd Company's Airstrip was located south and west of the Somerton Tank Farm. One runway ran southwest from the present intersection of Kevin Ct. and Tomlinson Rd. to near Red Lion Road; the other ran northwest from behind the Budd Plant to beyond the Philadelphia city limits into Lower Moreland Township, Montgomery County. The runways were built around 1942-1945 and were decommissioned by the early 1960s. Trenches were dug across the runways every 1000 feet to eliminate the activities of drag-racing enthusiasts and to stop the practice of racing and then abandoning stolen cars.

The Philadelphia State Hospital at Byberry was located at the northwestern corner of Roosevelt Blvd and Southampton Road from the early 1900s until it was decommissioned in the late 1980s through the 1990s.

== Notable people ==
- William Cooper, judge and father of James Fenimore Cooper
- Bushrod Washington James (1836-1903), surgeon, homeopathist, writer, and philanthropist
- Chris Matthews, television personality and former host of MSNBC's Hardball with Chris Matthews
- Robert Moffit, analyst at The Heritage Foundation
- Cristin O'Keefe Aptowicz, New York Times best-selling non-fiction writer and poet

== Education ==
=== Public ===
- Watson T. Comly Elementary School, built 1928, 1001 Byberry Rd;
- William H. Loesche, 11000 Bustleton Ave.
- George Washington High School, 10175 Bustleton Avenue

The historic Watson Comly School, built 1892-1893, was added to the National Register of Historic Places in 1988.

=== Archdiocesan ===
- St. Christopher School, 13000 Proctor Rd.

=== Private ===
Calvary Christian Academy, 13500 Philmont Ave.

=== Charter ===
- MaST Community Charter School, 1800 E. Byberry Rd. Mast Community Charter School, 1 E. Crown Way
- Philadelphia Academy Charter School (PACS), 1700 Tomlinson Road (high school) and 11000 Roosevelt Boulevard (grade school)

=== Libraries ===
The Free Library of Philadelphia operates the Bustleton Branch at 10199 Bustleton Avenue at Verree Road, near George Washington High School.
