= Senator Sommer =

Senator Sommer may refer to:

- Jacob Sommer (1758–1827), Pennsylvania State Senate
- Roger Sommer (politician) (born 1943), Illinois State Senate

== See also ==
- Heather Somers (born 1966), Connecticut State Senate
- Senator Summers (disambiguation)
