= Asplundh Tree Expert Company =

American vegetation management company

Asplundh Tree Expert, LLC
- Company type: Private
- Industry: Utility line clearance and infrastructure services
- Founded: August 28, 1928
- Founder: Asplundh brothers Griffith, Lester, and Carl Hjalmar, Sr.
- Headquarters: 708 Blair Mill Road, Willow Grove, Pennsylvania, United States
- Area served: United States, Canada, New Zealand and Australia
- Key people: Matthew B. Asplundh; (CEO); George Graham, Jr.; (President); Joseph P. Dwyer; (CFO)
- Revenue: $4.7B (2021)
- Number of employees: 34,000+
- Divisions: UtiliCon Solutions, Ltd.
- Subsidiaries: Asplundh Brush Control Co.
- Website: asplundh.com

Asplundh Tree Expert, LLC is an American company which specializes in tree pruning and vegetation management for utilities and government agencies. The company also performs utility line construction and maintenance, electrical systems testing, traffic signal and highway lighting construction and maintenance, automated metering infrastructure and home energy management program implementation.

== History ==
The Asplundh Tree Expert Co. was founded in 1928 in Pennsylvania by brothers Griffith, Lester and Carl Asplundh, members of a Swedish-American family who combined their educations and experience in arboriculture, electrical engineering and finance. The company specialized in "pruning trees around power and telephone lines". It was the first company to specialize in utility line clearance and vegetation management instead of residential services.

In 1940, the first issue of The Asplundh TREE magazine was issued to crews. By this time, the company had expanded from Pennsylvania to the Midwest and the Middle Atlantic states. In 1956, a subsidiary company, Asplundh Brush Control Co., was established.

In 1990, Asplundh acquired New York based B & J Maintenance Co., Inc, as well as L. Fulcher Electric, which was over five small clearance firms in France which became Asplundh's French subsidiary. Also during this year, the company expanded to New Zealand, acquiring Electrix Limited, which changed its name to Electrix Asplundh. By 1994, it had become the US's largest firm in utility clearance and one of the nation's largest privately held companies.

=== Illegal hiring ===
In 2017, the company pleaded guilty to a federal criminal charge and was ordered to pay a $95 million fine, the largest ever in an immigration case. This was after an investigation by U.S. Immigration and Customs Enforcement found that Asplundh hired thousands of illegal immigrants between 2010 and 2014. The illegal hiring was first uncovered in a 2009 audit, and although Asplundh did dismiss the workers that same year, many of the same workers were rehired by their managers after using fraudulent documents. "We accept responsibility for the charges as outlined, and we apologize to our customers, associates and all other stakeholders for what has occurred," said Chairman and CEO Scott Asplundh in a statement at the time.
