= Upper Moreland School District =

School district in Pennsylvania, United States

Address
- 2900 Terwood Road Willow Grove, Pennsylvania, 19090; United States

District information
- Type: Public
- Grades: K–12
- NCES District ID: 4224510

Students and staff
- Students: 3,197 (2020–2021)
- Teachers: 215.2 (on an FTE basis)
- Staff: 273.02 (on an FTE basis)
- Student–teacher ratio: 14.86:1

Other information
- Website: www.umtsd.org

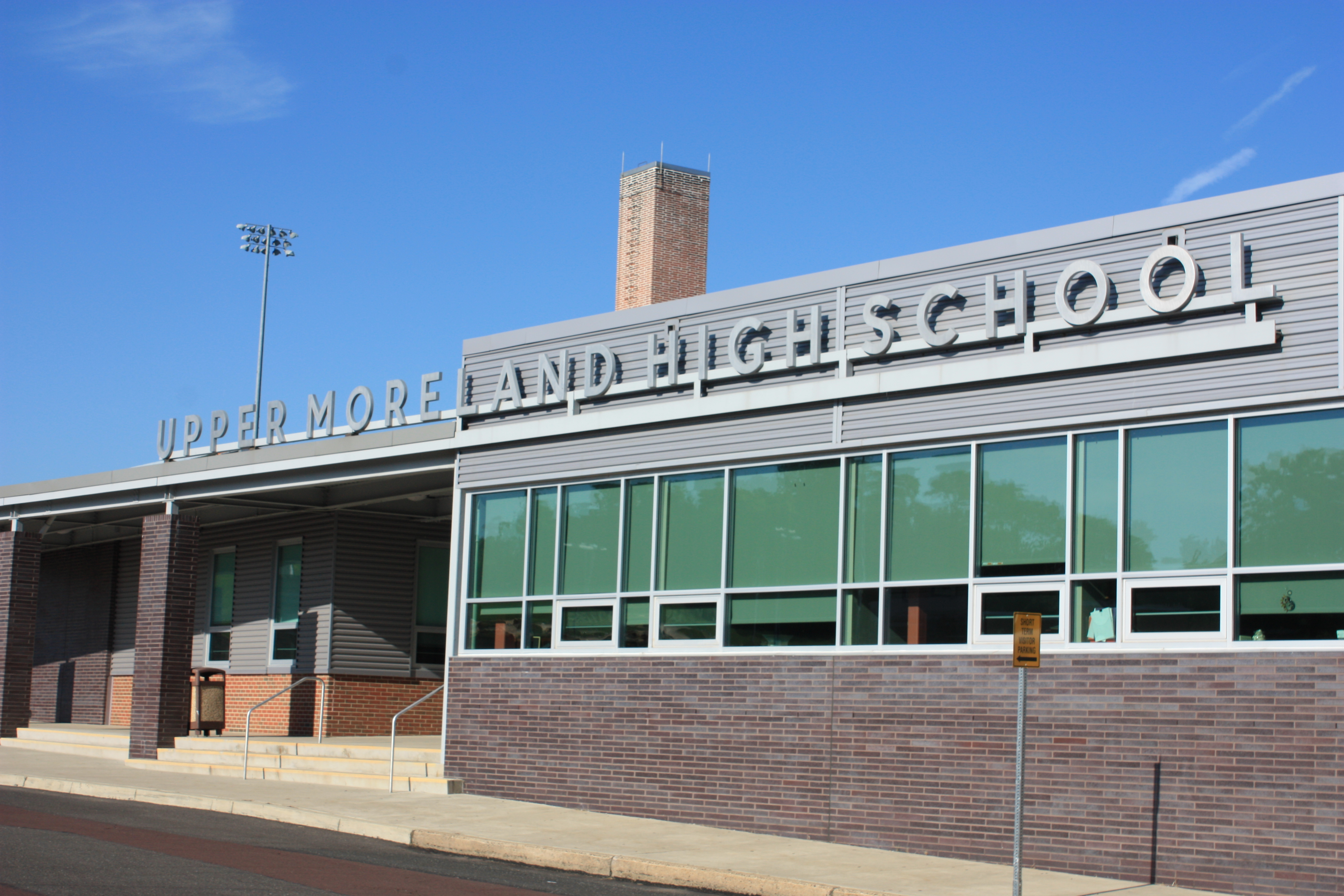
Upper Moreland High School

Upper Moreland School District is located in Upper Moreland Township, Montgomery County in the northern suburbs of Philadelphia, Pennsylvania. The Township has a general population of 25,000 residents who are served by the post offices of Willow Grove, Hatboro, and Huntingdon Valley, although due to postal and municipal boundaries, many students served by the Hatboro post office attend Hatboro-Horsham School District, while others served by the Huntingdon Valley post office attend Lower Moreland schools.

== Schools ==
This school district currently includes 4 schools: the Upper Moreland Primary School (UMPS, Grades K-2, built 1973, formerly known as the "new" Round Meadow Elementary School when it replaced the 1947 Round Meadow E.S.), the Upper Moreland Intermediate School (UMIS, Grades 3-5, built c. 2007), the Upper Moreland Middle School (UMMS, Grades 6-8, built 1970, formerly known as Upper Moreland Junior High School), which all sit at the district's campus at Orangeman's Rd. & Byberry Rd. in the section of Upper Moreland served by the Hatboro post office. The Upper Moreland High School (UMHS, Grades 9-12, built 1958) sits on Terwood Road in Willow Grove, directly adjacent to the Warminster Line of SEPTA Regional Rail, and its campus includes the school district's administration building and bus garage.

== Notable alumni ==
Among the alumni of Upper Moreland High School are Pennsylvania State Senator Stewart Greenleaf R-12th and First Lady of the United States Jill Biden.
