= Jacob Sommer =

American politician (1758–1827)

Jacob Sommer (14 February 1758 – February 1827) was an officer in the American Revolution, a Pennsylvania State Senator, and an Associate Judge who lived in Moreland Township, Philadelphia County, Pennsylvania. The neighborhood of Somerton in northeast Philadelphia was named for him.

== Early life ==
Born in Philadelphia, Jacob Sommer was the son of Johannes (John) and Anna Eva Sommer. The Sommer family emigrated from Freistett, Baden, Germany, arriving in Philadelphia in 1752. John Sommer, Jacob's father, purchased property in the Manor of Moreland in 1761 where he was later recorded as a town supervisor in 1773 and a tax collector in 1775.

== Prisoner of war ==
During the American Revolution, toward the end of the Philadelphia campaign, the Battle of Crooked Billet occurred in Hatboro, Pennsylvania, about six miles distant from a village in Moreland called Smithfield. The battle occurred on May 1, 1778, the same date that Ensign Jacob Sommers of the Pennsylvania militia was taken prisoner at his home. Ensign Jacob Sommer was held prisoner on Long Island for four years until his release in 1782.

== Political career ==
The political career of Jacob Sommer of Moreland included running for the following elected offices, all for representation in Philadelphia County:

Year	Office	Affiliation	Result
1802	PA House of Representatives	Republican	Lost
1803	PA House of Representatives	No party	Lost
1804	PA House of Representatives	Federalist Quid	Lost
1805–1809	PA State Senate	Federalist Constitutional Republican; Quid	Won, 4-year term
1809	PA State Senate	Federalist	Lost
1816	US House of Representatives	New School Republican	Lost
1818	US House of Representatives	Republican	Lost

Jacob Sommer was commissioned as an associate judge for the District Court of Philadelphia from 1811 to 1821. He continued to be known as a judge in subsequent years because in 1824, Judge Jacob Sommer was a member of the correspondence committee to elect Andrew Jackson for U.S. President.

== Personal life ==
The marital life of Jacob Sommer is unknown. He died in February, 1827 at the age of 69, and was buried at the cemetery of St. Michael's and Zion German Lutheran Church in Philadelphia. His will mentioned only one child, Dr. John Sommer of Philadelphia.
