= Northeast Village, Philadelphia =

Former military housing project in Philadelphia, Pennsylvania, United States

The Northeast Village was a wartime military housing project just south of the present Normandy Village, between Red Lion Rd. to the south, Decatur Rd. to the east, Comly Rd. to the north, and the Roosevelt Boulevard to the west in Philadelphia, Pennsylvania, United States. The land was owned by several farmers named John and Joseph Root, Warder Jenks, William Knight, Humphrey Humphreys, William Morrow and Thomas Lees.

Construction on the complex was begun in 1946 and was opened in January 1947. The Benjamin Crispin (Northeast Village) Elementary School Annex was located at Midday and Clipper Roads. In 1949, the U.S. Government turned the property over to the Philadelphia Housing Authority (PHA). In 1950, a U.S. Air Force jet crashed into a row of homes on the east end of the complex, on Beachhead Road near Lagoon Road. This caused the PHA to tear down several of the homes on that street. In 1953, more homes were torn down to make way for the construction of a northern extension of the main north–south runway of North Philadelphia (now Northeast) airport. In 1960, PHA gave an order to close the complex. In 1962, dismantling began and the site was completely cleared to make way for the Northeast Philadelphia Industrial Park.

Northeast Village was indeed a “village” unto itself, with its own stores, fire house, elementary school, and a network of some five miles of winding roads. The streets – with names like Atoll Road and Lagoon Road – were named for South Pacific locations that were familiar to many of the veteran residents. By all accounts, the community was close-knit and the residents civic-minded.

Now, the industrial park is mostly vacant, as the IRS abandoned its complex there when it moved recently to the old Post Office building at 30th and Market Streets.

The only vestiges of the Northeast Village can be found today by driving on Norcom Road about 1500 feet above Red Lion Road; the partially paved 5-6' width that has not grown over with vegetation are the remains of Dune Rd (looking north to south) and Echelon Rd (looking east to west) (per research done 13 November 2017) Dune Rd is at an approximate 60-degree angle south of Norcom Rd.

The following fire alarm box assignments were designated to the Northeast Village between around 1950 to around 1962:

Number	Location
4738	Roosevelt Blvd. and Sea Lane
6429	Wake and Atoll Roads
6659	Beachhead and Midday Roads
6675	Wake and Midday Roads
6678	Shore and Air Lanes
6681	Dune and Atoll Roads
