= Senator Summers =

Senator Summers may refer to:

- Albert E. Summers (1824–1901), West Virginia State Senate
- Carden Summers (born 1947), Georgia State Senate
- Charlie Summers (born 1959), Maine State Senate
- Jacob Summers (1787–1863), Michigan State Senate
- Lewis Summers (Virginian) (1778–1843), Ohio State Senate

== See also ==
- Heather Somers (born 1966), Connecticut State Senate
- Senator Sommer (disambiguation)
