= Moreland Township, Philadelphia County, Pennsylvania =

Moreland Township
- Former Township
- Location of Moreland Township in Pennsylvania Moreland Township (the United States)
- Coordinates: 40°03′47″N 74°59′42″W
- Country: United States
- State: Pennsylvania
- County: Philadelphia
- Time zone: UTC-5 (EST)
  - Summer (DST): UTC-4 (EDT)
- Area codes: 215, 267, and 445

Moreland Township was a township that was located in Philadelphia County, Pennsylvania, United States.

== History ==
In 1682, William Penn sold nearly 10,000 acres of land to Nicholas More. The land, referred to by Penn as the Manor of Moreland, was located on the main branches of the Poquessing and Pennypack Creeks in the most northern portion of Philadelphia county.

In 1718, the Court of Quarter Sessions created the Township of Moreland from previous More family holdings as well as two strips of land between the Byberry and County Line Roads. Moreland Township was situated to the north of Dublin Township, and westward of Byberry Township. The rise of Moreland Township in Philadelphia County was five miles, its greatest length; two miles in width; area, 3,720 acres (15 km^{2}). One of the principal villages was Smithfield, afterwards called Somerton, which was partly in Moreland and partly in Byberry.

In 1784, Montgomery County was created from parts of Philadelphia County, and subsequently, Moreland Township was divided into two townships, one in each county and each called Moreland. Thus from 1784-1854, there were two tangential Moreland Townships in the Philadelphia region.

In 1854, Moreland Township of Philadelphia County ceased to exist as it was incorporated into the City of Philadelphia following the passage of the Act of Consolidation, 1854. Moreland Township of Montgomery County continued to exist until 1917 when it was split into Upper Moreland Township and Lower Moreland Township.

== Resources ==
- Chronology of the Political Subdivisions of the County of Philadelphia, 1683-1854 (Daly, John; Weinberg, Allen (October 1966). Genealogy of Philadelphia County Subdivisions (Second ed.). Philadelphia Dept. of Records.)
- Information courtesy of ushistory.org
- Incorporated District, Boroughs, and Townships in the County of Philadelphia, 1854 By Rudolph J. Walther - excerpted from the book at the ushistory.org website
