= Byberry, Philadelphia =

Township of Byberry
- Former Township
- Location of Byberry Township of Byberry (Pennsylvania) Township of Byberry (the United States)
- Country: United States
- State: Pennsylvania
- County: Philadelphia
- Time zone: UTC-5 (EST)
  - Summer (DST): UTC-4 (EDT)
- Area codes: 215, 267, and 445

Byberry is a neighborhood in the far northeast section of Philadelphia, in the U.S. state of Pennsylvania. Originally it was incorporated as the Township of Byberry and was the northeasternmost municipality of Philadelphia County before the City and County were consolidated in 1854. Its approximate boundaries are the Poquessing Creek to the north, Woodhaven Road to the south, the Roosevelt Boulevard to the west, and Thornton Road to the east.

Byberry had a strong abolitionist presence and may have been an original stop on the Underground Railroad. Today, the area occupied by the township is mostly synonymous with the neighborhood of Somerton, as the neighborhoods of Byberry and Somerton tend to overlap.

== History ==
A township in the extreme northeastern part of the County of Philadelphia; bounded on the east and northeast by Poquessing Creek and Bucks County; on the northwest by Montgomery County; and on the west and southwest by the Township of Moreland.

Its greatest length was estimated at 5 miles (8.0 kilometres); its greatest breadth, 2 1/2 miles (4.0 kilometres); area, 4.700 acres (0.01902 km^{2}). The area was originally settled in the mid-17th century by Swedes. In 1675, four young, single brothers, Nathaniel, Thomas, Daniel and William Walton, arrived at Newcastle from England and, having first prospected the land in the neighborhood of the Delaware River, chose this area along the Poquessing Creek to settle. They gave it the name Byberry, in honor of their native town, near Bristol, in England.

They were joined after the arrival of the ship Welcome in 1682, by Giles and Joseph Knight, John Carver, John Hart, Richard Collett and their families, and others. Byberry was the birthplace of Benjamin Rush, a signer of the Declaration of Independence.

The township was consolidated and established soon after the arrival of William Penn. Byberry Township initially consisted only of a few villages, and was the most rural of all the townships of Philadelphia County. Byberry Crossroads, once called Plumbsock, and Knightsville were the principal villages.

== Notable people ==
- Reverend Thomas Hall, Loyalist Anglican cleric who emigrated back to England and subsequently served as the chaplain in Livorno, Italy. He was the cousin of Benjamin Rush and the nephew of Rev. Samuel Finley.
- Harriet Forten Purvis, abolitionist and suffragette
- Robert Purvis, father of the Underground Railroad
