= Byberry, Missouri =

Extinct hamlet in Missouri, U.S.

Coordinates: 38.6916866°N 92.9276965°W

Byberry is an extinct town in Cooper County, in the U.S. state of Missouri.

A post office called Byberry was established in 1890, and remained in operation until 1914. The community derives its name from William Berry, an early settler.
