= Willow Grove, Pennsylvania =

Unincorporated community in Pennsylvania, US

Willow Grove
- Census-designated place
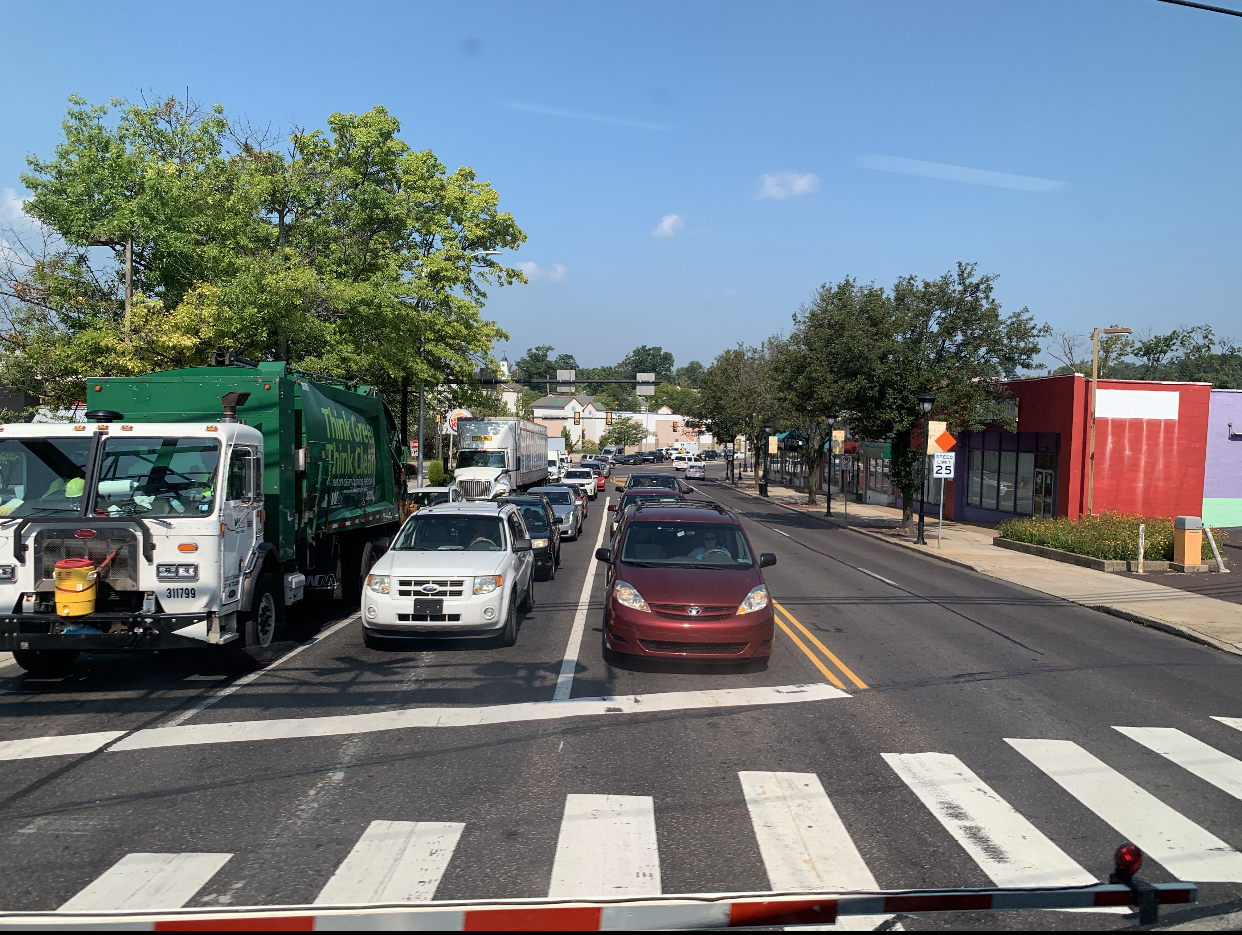
- North York Road in downtown Willow Grove
- Nickname: The Grove
- Location within Pennsylvania Location within the United States
- Coordinates: 40°08′38″N 75°06′57″W
- Country: United States
- State: Pennsylvania
- County: Montgomery
- Township: Abington, Upper Moreland

Area
  - Total: 3.6 sq mi (9.3 km^{2})
  - Land: 3.6 sq mi (9.3 km^{2})
  - Water: 0.0 sq mi (0 km^{2})
- Elevation: 269 ft (82 m)

Population (2010)
  - Total: 15,726
  - Density: 4,400/sq mi (1,700/km^{2})
- Time zone: UTC-5 (Eastern (EST))
  - Summer (DST): UTC-4 (EDT)
- ZIP Code: 19090
- Area codes: 215, 267, and 445
- GNIS feature ID: 1193673

Willow Grove is a census-designated place (CDP) in Montgomery County, Pennsylvania, United States. A community in Philadelphia's northern suburbs, the population was 13,730 at the 2020 census. It is located in Abington Township and Upper Moreland Township. Willow Grove was once known for Willow Grove Park, an amusement park that was open from 1896 to 1976, now the site of Willow Grove Park Mall. Willow Grove is considered an edge city of Philadelphia, with large amounts of retail and office space.

Naval Air Station Joint Reserve Base Willow Grove was located northwest of the Willow Grove CDP in Horsham Township. NAS JRB Willow Grove transitioned into Horsham Air National Guard Station in September 2011.

Willow Grove is located 37 miles (60 km) southeast of Allentown and 13 miles (21 km) north of Philadelphia.

== History ==
The place was on the route of an old Lenape trail to New York and developed into a typical colonial crossroads, with inns, stables, blacksmiths, and wheelwright shops. William Penn granted land to physician Nicholas More and the tract became known as the "Manor of Moreland" and later, Moreland Township. The place dates to the year 1711 when the Old York Road was laid out from Philadelphia to New Hope where the Delaware River was crossed at Coryell's Ferry. In 1792, mapmaker Reading Howell was said to remark upon the abundance of "willow trees in the marshy land" and the name "Willow Grove" stuck. During the American Revolution, inn keeper Joseph Butler, proprietor of the Red Lion Inn at Willow Grove tended to wounded American soldiers. He was later arrested by the British and held prisoner in Philadelphia.

In 1778, British troops under Lt. Col. Abercromby marched through Willow Grove to the Battle of Crooked Billet in Hatboro.

=== 19th century ===
By 1850, the village was a major crossroads and stage coach stop with five stage lines a day. George Rex, a blacksmith from Germantown, had developed the Mineral Springs Inn in the early 19th century. The springs contained a high concentrate of minerals, like iron and sulfur, which had a reputation of curative powers. There was a recreational park with walking trails and gardens, mineral spring water baths and stables for 100 horses. It was likely at these stables that the Irish emigrant Thomas Carolan (1806–1870) found work as a blacksmith and farrier. In 1847, Carolan, wife Elizabeth Smyth (1817–1876) and their children had fled the Great Hunger in Ireland aboard the Patrick Henry. They made their way to Willow Grove where they lived until taken in by an elderly Quaker couple with a 100-acre farm a mile to the north east of the village. They moved to a farm near Fitzwatertown by 1865.

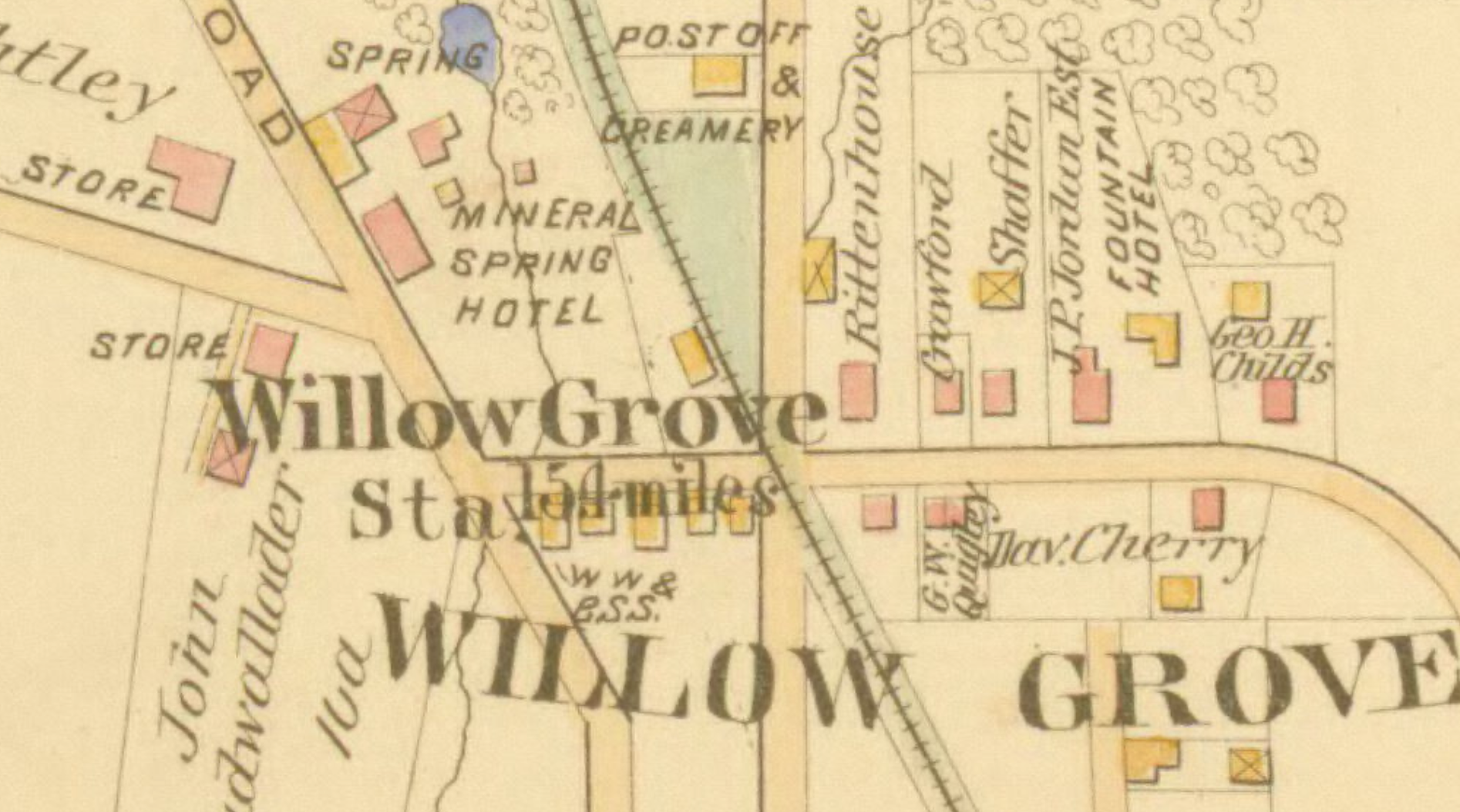
Atlas of the Properties Along the North Pennsylvania, Bound Brook, and Pennsylvania Railroads, William Baist, 1891

In 1896, Willow Grove Park was established by the owners of the Philadelphia Rapid Transit Company as an escape from the hot summers in Philadelphia. The Pennsylvania & Reading Railroad erected a station in Willow Grove. Soon it became a popular music venue where band leaders like John Philip Sousa drew as many as 50,000 people a day to the concerts. The park later featured amusement rides and, for a time, was referred to as the "Music Capital of the World".

== Demographics ==
=== 2020 census ===
As of the 2020 census, Willow Grove had a population of 13,730. The median age was 39.4 years. 21.0% of residents were under the age of 18 and 16.5% of residents were 65 years of age or older. For every 100 females there were 95.3 males, and for every 100 females age 18 and over there were 92.7 males age 18 and over.

100.0% of residents lived in urban areas, while 0.0% lived in rural areas.

There were 5,450 households in Willow Grove, of which 29.8% had children under the age of 18 living in them. Of all households, 47.5% were married-couple households, 18.7% were households with a male householder and no spouse or partner present, and 27.6% were households with a female householder and no spouse or partner present. About 28.3% of all households were made up of individuals and 13.2% had someone living alone who was 65 years of age or older.

There were 5,668 housing units, of which 3.8% were vacant. The homeowner vacancy rate was 0.6% and the rental vacancy rate was 4.6%.

Racial composition as of the 2020 census
Race	Number	Percent
White	10,212	74.4%
Black or African American	1,471	10.7%
American Indian and Alaska Native	16	0.1%
Asian	821	6.0%
Native Hawaiian and Other Pacific Islander	6	0.0%
Some other race	313	2.3%
Two or more races	891	6.5%
Hispanic or Latino (of any race)	861	6.3%

=== 2010 census ===
As of the 2010 census, the Willow Grove CDP was 81.4% White, 8.2% Black or African American, 0.2% Native American, 4.9% Asian, 1.1% were Some Other Race, and 2.3% were two or more races. 3.5% of the population were of Hispanic or Latino ancestry.

=== 2000 census ===
As of the 2000 census, there were 16,234 people, 6,389 households, and 4,255 families residing in the CDP. The population density was 4,485.7 inhabitants per square mile (1,731.9/km^{2}). There were 6,582 housing units at an average density of 1,818.7 per square mile (702.2/km^{2}). The racial makeup of the CDP was 88.57% White, 6.58% African American, 0.09% Native American, 3.06% Asian, 0.02% Pacific Islander, 0.48% from other races, and 1.21% from two or more races. Hispanic or Latino of any race were 1.57% of the population.

There were 6,389 households, out of which 30.0% had children under the age of 18 living with them, 53.3% were married couples living together, 10.0% had a female householder with no husband present, and 33.4% were non-families. 28.1% of all households were made up of individuals, and 11.3% had someone living alone who was 65 years of age or older. The average household size was 2.46 and the average family size was 3.05.

In the CDP, the population was spread out, with 22.9% under the age of 18, 6.5% from 18 to 24, 31.7% from 25 to 44, 21.4% from 45 to 64, and 17.4% who were 65 years of age or older. The median age was 38 years. For every 100 females, there were 89.3 males. For every 100 females age 18 and over, there were 85.5 males.

The median income for a household in the CDP was $50,378, and the median income for a family was $62,163. Males had a median income of $40,393 versus $32,451 for females. The per capita income for the CDP was $24,740. About 2.8% of families and 4.9% of the population were below the poverty line, including 4.5% of those under age 18 and 4.0% of those age 65 or over.

Historical population
Census	Pop.	Note	%±
1990	16,325		—
2000	16,234		−0.6%
2010	15,726		−3.1%
2020	13,730		−12.7%

== Economy ==
Asplundh Tree Expert Company is based in Willow Grove. China Airlines operates the Philadelphia Mini Office (Chinese: 費城營業所 Fèichéng Yíngyèsuǒ) in Building 39G at 2300 Computer Avenue in the Willow Grove CDP and in Upper Moreland Township.

== Infrastructure ==
=== Transportation ===
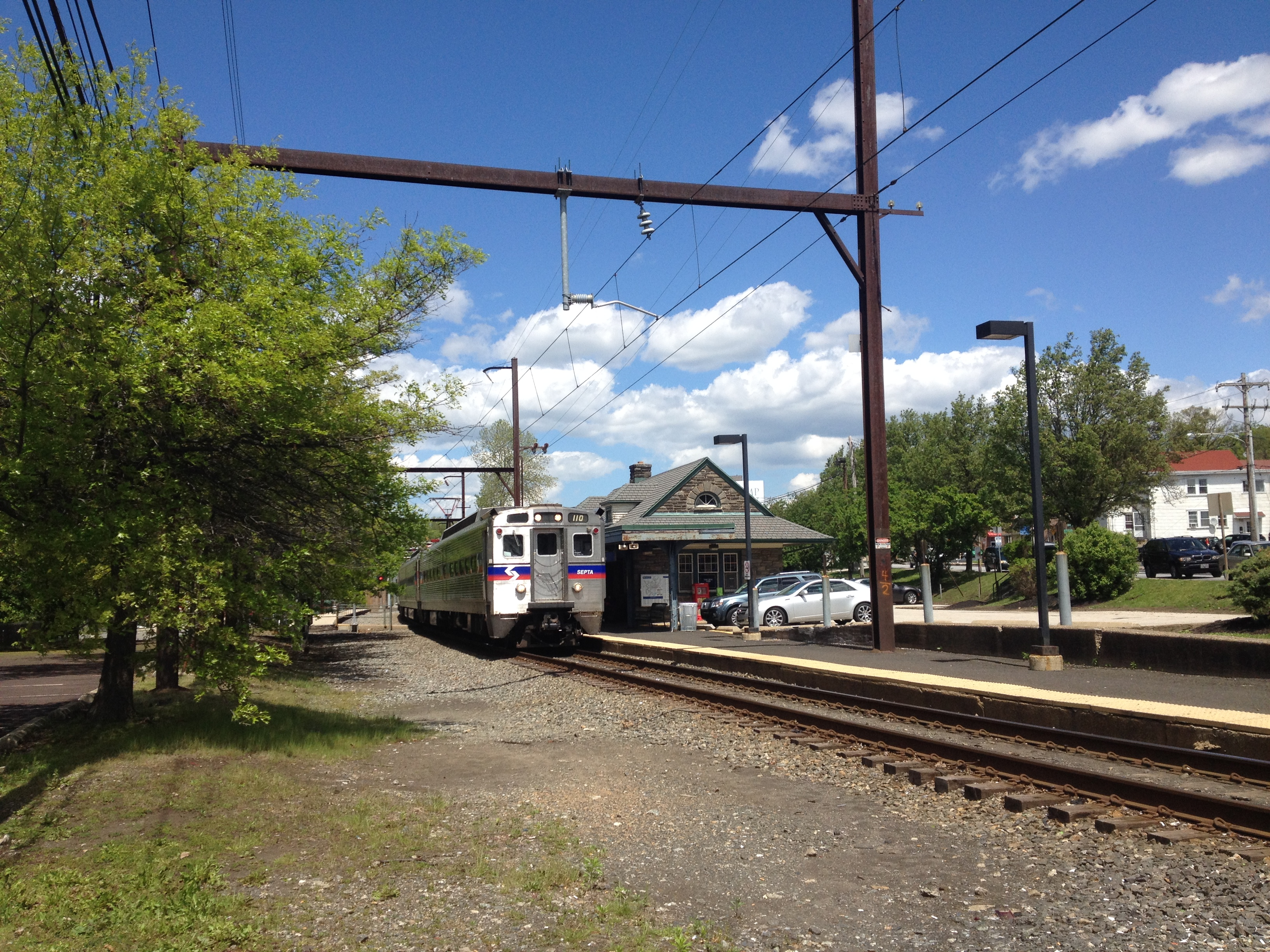
A SEPTA Regional Rail train on the Warminster Line stopping at the Willow Grove station

Willow Grove is served by the Willow Grove Interchange (exit 343) along the east–west Pennsylvania Turnpike (Interstate 276), which connects to Pennsylvania Route 611. Major roads serving Willow Grove are Pennsylvania Route 611 (Old York Road/Easton Road), Pennsylvania Route 263 (York Road), Pennsylvania Route 63 (Moreland Road), Fitzwatertown Road, Terwood Road, Davisville Road, Easton Road, and Old Welsh Road.

Willow Grove is served by the Willow Grove station on SEPTA Regional Rail's Warminster Line, which runs between Warminster Township and Center City Philadelphia. The community is served by five SEPTA bus routes, with a transit hub at the Willow Grove Park Mall. The Route 22 bus runs between Olney Transportation Center in North Philadelphia and Warminster via Willow Grove and the Route 55 bus runs between Olney Transportation Center and Doylestown via Willow Grove. Both the Route 22 and 55 buses have several trips from Olney Transportation Center that terminate at the Willow Grove Park Mall. The Route 95 bus runs between the Willow Grove Park Mall and Gulph Mills. The Route 310 bus connects the Willow Grove Park Mall to business parks in Horsham.

Norfolk Southern Railway's Morrisville Line freight railroad line passes through Willow Grove, running parallel to the south of the Pennsylvania Turnpike.

=== Utilities ===
Electricity and natural gas in Willow Grove is provided by PECO Energy Company, a subsidiary of Exelon. Water in Willow Grove is provided by Aqua Pennsylvania, a subsidiary of Aqua America. Trash and recycling collection in the Willow Grove area is provided by the respective townships. Cable, telephone, and internet service to the area is provided by Xfinity and Verizon. Willow Grove is served by area codes 215, 267, and 445.

=== Health care ===
Jefferson Health–Abington operates the Jefferson Health–Willow Grove (formerly Abington Health Center–Willow Grove) health center in Willow Grove. The health center, which was founded in 1983, consists of four buildings and offers outpatient hospital services including healthcare programs, medical and administrative offices, and conference and educational facilities.

== Education ==
The Willow Grove CDP is divided between two school districts: Upper Moreland School District (for portions in Upper Moreland Township), and Abington School District (for portions in Abington Township).

Upper Dublin School District is another area school district.

The area Catholic school is Queen of Angels Regional Catholic School in Willow Grove and Upper Moreland Township. Queen of Angels was formed in 2012 by the merger of St. David in Willow Grove and Our Lady Help of Christians in Abington.

== Notable people ==
- Jill Biden, Former First Lady of the United States
- Stewart Greenleaf, State Senator, 12th district
- Edwin Hallowell, Democratic member of the U.S. House of Representatives; born in Willow Grove
- Miles J. Jones, American pathologist
- Enolia McMillan, first female national president of the NAACP; born in Willow Grove
- Bud Powell, jazz pianist, had a second home in Willow Grove and named one of his compositions after the suburb
- Chris Raab, professional stuntman and actor
- Craig Reynolds, NFL running back
- Cal Schenkel, American artist

== In popular culture ==
- In the song "Please Don't Tell My Father That I Used His 1996 Honda Accord To Destroy The Town Of Willow Grove, Pennsylvania In 2002", by pop punk band Pet Symmetry, Evan Weiss (also of Into It. Over It.) describes his actions vandalizing Willow Grove as a teenager.
- In the American comedy-drama The Goldbergs, the main cast visits the Willow Grove Park Mall in numerous episodes.
- U.S. First Cat Willow is named after the town.
- The television series Ghost Hunters filmed an episode in the American Legion Post 308 to the west of Willow Grove in an episode titled "Unexplained Phenomena," which aired in Season 5, Episode 24 on December 9, 2009. "The team probes an 18th-century farmhouse in Willow Grove, Pa., where spirits allegedly play with the lights and cast large, dark shadows."
