= Normandy, Philadelphia =

Normandy
- Neighborhood of Philadelphia
- Location within Philadelphia
- Country: United States
- State: Pennsylvania
- County: Philadelphia County
- City: Philadelphia
- Area codes: 215, 267 and 445

Normandy is a neighborhood in Northeast Philadelphia, Pennsylvania, United States. It is located east of Roosevelt Boulevard, in the vicinity of Woodhaven and Byberry Roads.

== History and notable features ==
Built between 1955 and 1956, this neighborhood is made up of Cape Cod-style single-family homes with frame construction. Most of the homes have received additions over the years. All of the streets in this neighborhood begin with the letter N.

The original landowners were Joseph Buckman, who owned 73 acres (300,000 m^{2}) and John Rieger, who owned 18 acres (73,000 m^{2}). The Northeast Village was a wartime military housing project just south of the present Normandy Village.

The old Nabisco/Mondelez International plant at the southwest corner of Roosevelt Boulevard and Byberry Road was demolished between 2017 and 2018 to pave way for a present Wawa. Provco Group, which owns the real estate, is in the process of building a Topgolf facility and is proposing a pair of strip mall-style buildings and a standalone restaurant along Roosevelt Boulevard. Those would be adjacent to the Wawa, which opened near Byberry Road as part of the first phase of the redevelopment of the site. Devon Self-Storage occupies what used to be Best products, also what was the original Normandy Square market.
