= Upper Moreland Township, Pennsylvania =

Township in Pennsylvania, US

Upper Moreland Township
- Township
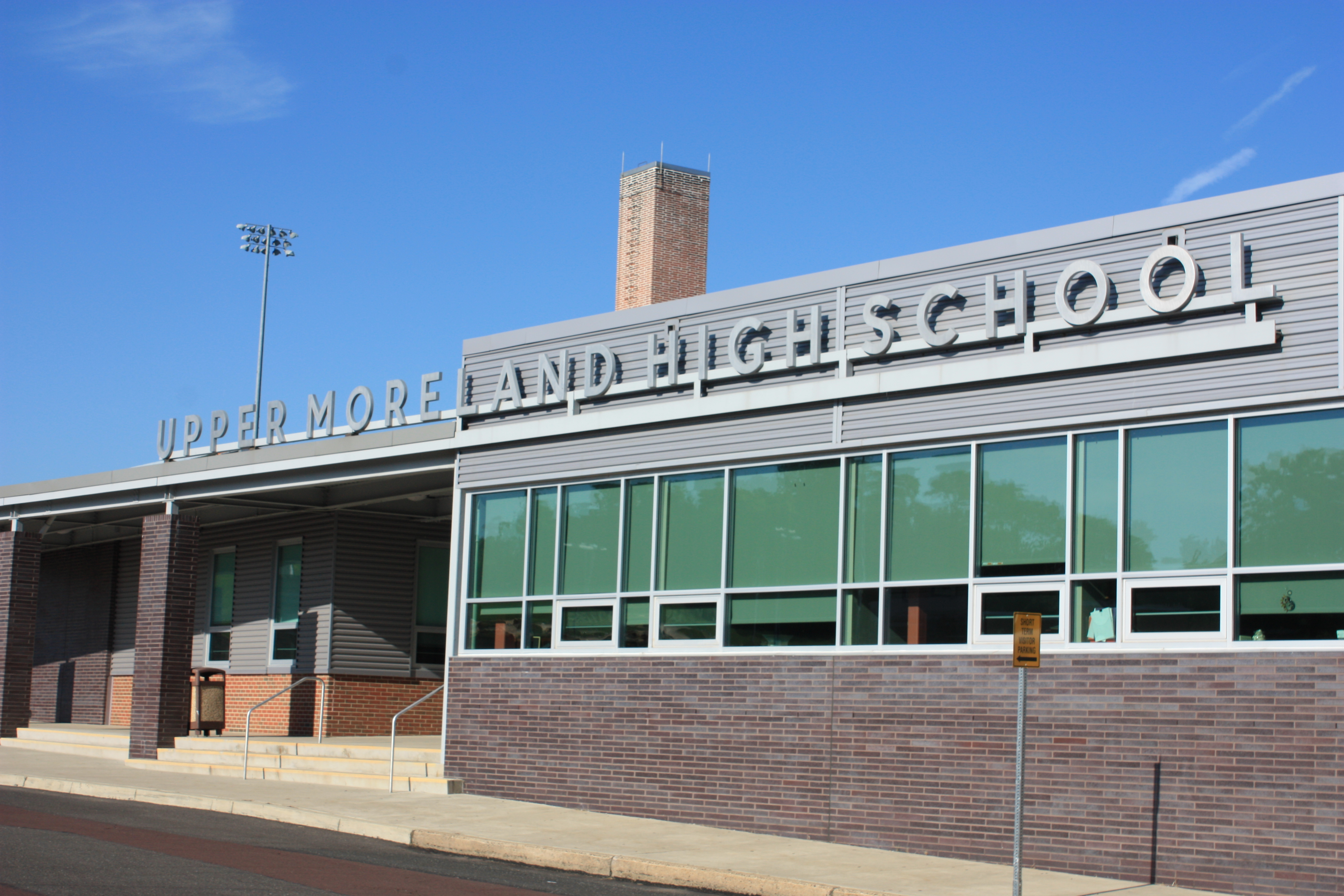
- Upper Moreland High School
- Nickname: golden bears
- Motto: live strong and be golden
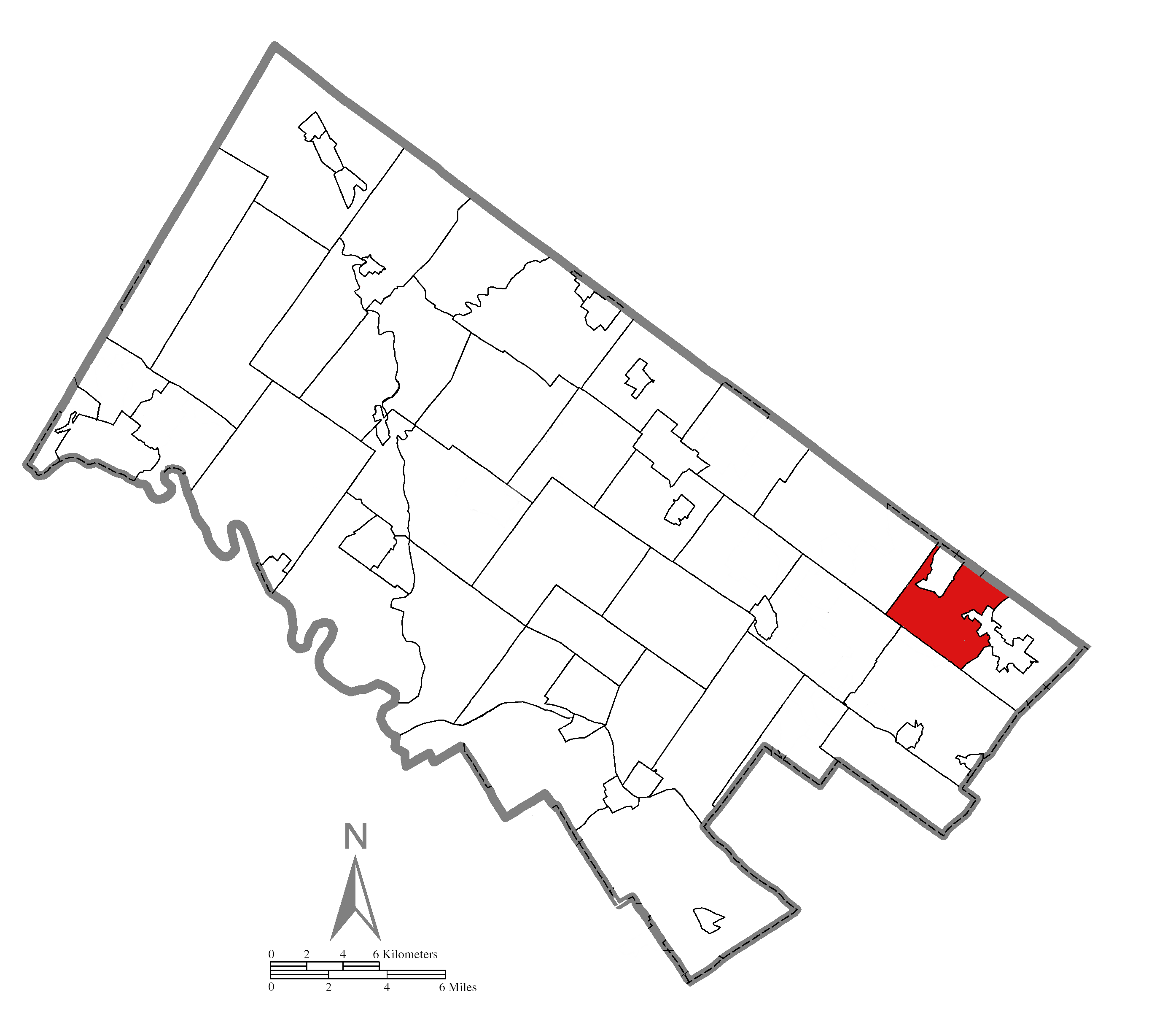
- Location of Upper Moreland Township in Montgomery County

- Location of Upper Moreland Township in Pennsylvania Upper Moreland Township (the United States)
- Coordinates: 40°09′26″N 75°06′07″W
- Country: United States
- State: Pennsylvania
- County: Montgomery

Government
  - Type: Council-manager

Area
  - Total: 7.98 sq mi (20.7 km^{2})
  - Land: 7.97 sq mi (20.6 km^{2})
  - Water: 0.01 sq mi (0.026 km^{2})
- Elevation: 177 ft (54 m)

Population (2020)
  - Total: 26,116
  - Estimate (2025): 25,880
  - Density: 3,280/sq mi (1,270/km^{2})
- Time zone: UTC-5 (EST)
  - Summer (DST): UTC-4 (EDT)
- ZIP Codes: 19006, 19040, 19090
- Area codes: 215, 267 and 445
- FIPS code: 42-091-79176
- Website: www.uppermoreland.org

Upper Moreland Township is a township in Montgomery County, Pennsylvania. Its population was 24,015 at the 2010 census. Upper Moreland Township is a primarily residential community located about 13 miles outside Center City Philadelphia. It is made up of distinctive neighborhoods that are complemented by several thriving business, industrial, and commercial districts.

== Geography ==
According to the U.S. Census Bureau, the township has a total area of 7.5 square miles (19 km^{2}), all land. Upper Moreland is part of the Philadelphia metropolitan area and is about 15 miles (24 km) north of Center City, Philadelphia. The township is bordered by the Montgomery County communities of Hatboro, Horsham, Upper Dublin, Abington, Bryn Athyn, and Lower Moreland, while Bucks County lies to the north.

== Demographics ==
Historical population
Census	Pop.	Note	%±
1930	3,989		—
1940	5,103		27.9%
1950	8,936		75.1%
1960	21,032		135.4%
1970	24,866		18.2%
1980	25,874		4.1%
1990	25,313		−2.2%
2000	24,993		−1.3%
2010	24,015		−3.9%
2020	26,116		8.7%
U.S. Decennial Census

At the 2010 census, the township was 85.2% White, 5.1% Black or African American, 0.2% Native American, 4.4% Asian, 0.1% Native Hawaiian and Other Pacific Islander, 1.3% were some other race, and 1.9% were two or more races. About 3.6% of the population were of Hispanic or Latino ancestry.

At the 2000 census, 24,993 people, 10,120 households, and 6,638 families were residing in the township. The population density was 3,139.6 per square mile (1,212.2/km^{2}). The 10,403 housing units had an average density of 1,306.8 per square mile (504.6/km^{2}). The racial makeup was 90.72% White, 4.36% African American, 0.10% Native American, 3.17% Asian, 0.60% from other races, and 1.04% from two or more races. Hispanics or Latinos of any race were 1.73% of the population.

Of the 10,120 households, 28.3% had children under 18 living with them, 53.4% were married couples living together, 9.1% had a female householder with no husband present, and 34.4% were not families. About 28.7% of all households were made up of individuals, and 12.0% had someone living alone who was 65 or older. The average household size was 2.40 and the average family size was 3.00.

The township's age distribution was 22.1% under 18, 6.9% from 18 to 24, 31.3% from 25 to 44, 21.4% from 45 to 64, and 18.3% who were 65 or older. The median age was 39 years. For every 100 females, there were 91.8 males. For every 100 females 18 and over, there were 88.0 males.

The median household income was $50,454 and the median family income was $61,143. Males had a median income of $41,697 and females $31,963. The per capita income was $25,382. About 3.0% of families and 4.9% of the population were below the poverty line, including 4.1% of those under 18 and 5.3% of those 65 or over.

== History ==
William Penn presented the tract of land around present-day Upper Moreland Township to Nicholas More in 1682. At the time, the area was referred to as the "Manor of Mooreland." Moreland Township was first used to describe the tract in the 18th century but the current boundaries were not fixed until 1916 when a line was drawn through the Pennypack Creek and two municipalities were created: Upper and Lower Moreland Townships. In 1930, Upper Moreland Township was formally organized as a first-class township.

== Government ==
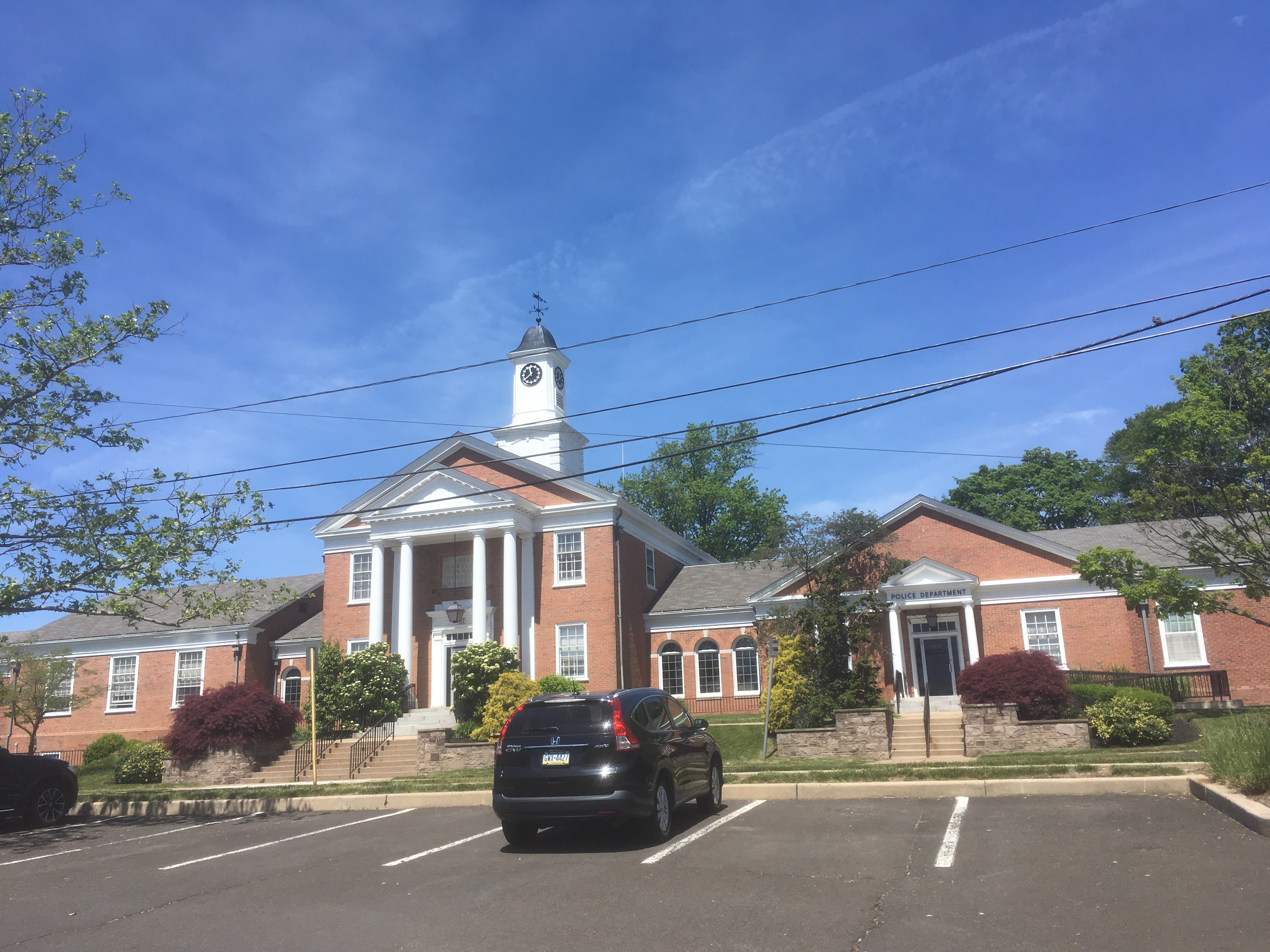
Upper Moreland Township municipal building

Presidential elections results
Year	Republican	Democratic
2024	41.9% 6,297	57.0% 8,569
2020	40.0% 6,045	58.3% 8,840
2016	40.7% 5,275	53.8% 6,973
2012	43.6% 5,341	55.0% 6,729
2008	41.3% 5,328	57.8% 7,448
2004	45.6% 5,810	53.9% 6,861
2000	46.0% 5,058	51.1% 5,627
1996	43.1% 4,317	45.1% 4,517
1992	41.7% 4,796	38.7% 4,451

Upper Moreland's governmental structure and powers are derived from the laws of the Commonwealth of Pennsylvania. Upper Moreland's seven-member governing body, the board of commissioners, is composed of representatives elected from each of the township's seven wards to serve a four-year term. The daily operations of the municipality are administered by the township manager, assistant township manager, chief of police, and directors of emergency services, code enforcement, public works, parks and recreation, and finance. These positions, as well as the township solicitor and township engineer, are appointed by the board of commissioners. The only other elected official is the Township Treasurer.

Township Commissioners:

Ward 1 - Jay Silverman
Ward 2 - Alan Sentman
Ward 3 - Sandra Richman
Ward 4 - Demond Mullen
Ward 5 - Clifton (Kip) McFatridge, President
Ward 6 - Susan Worth-LaManna, Vice President
Ward 7 - Sarah Byrnes

Township Treasurer: Alex Levy

== Economy ==
The township states that the proximity of the Pennsylvania Turnpike attracts firms to the township.

China Airlines operates the Philadelphia Mini Office (Chinese: 費城營業所 Fèichéng Yíngyèsuǒ) in Building 39G at 2300 Computer Avenue in the Willow Grove CDP and in Upper Moreland Township.

== Infrastructure ==
=== Transportation ===
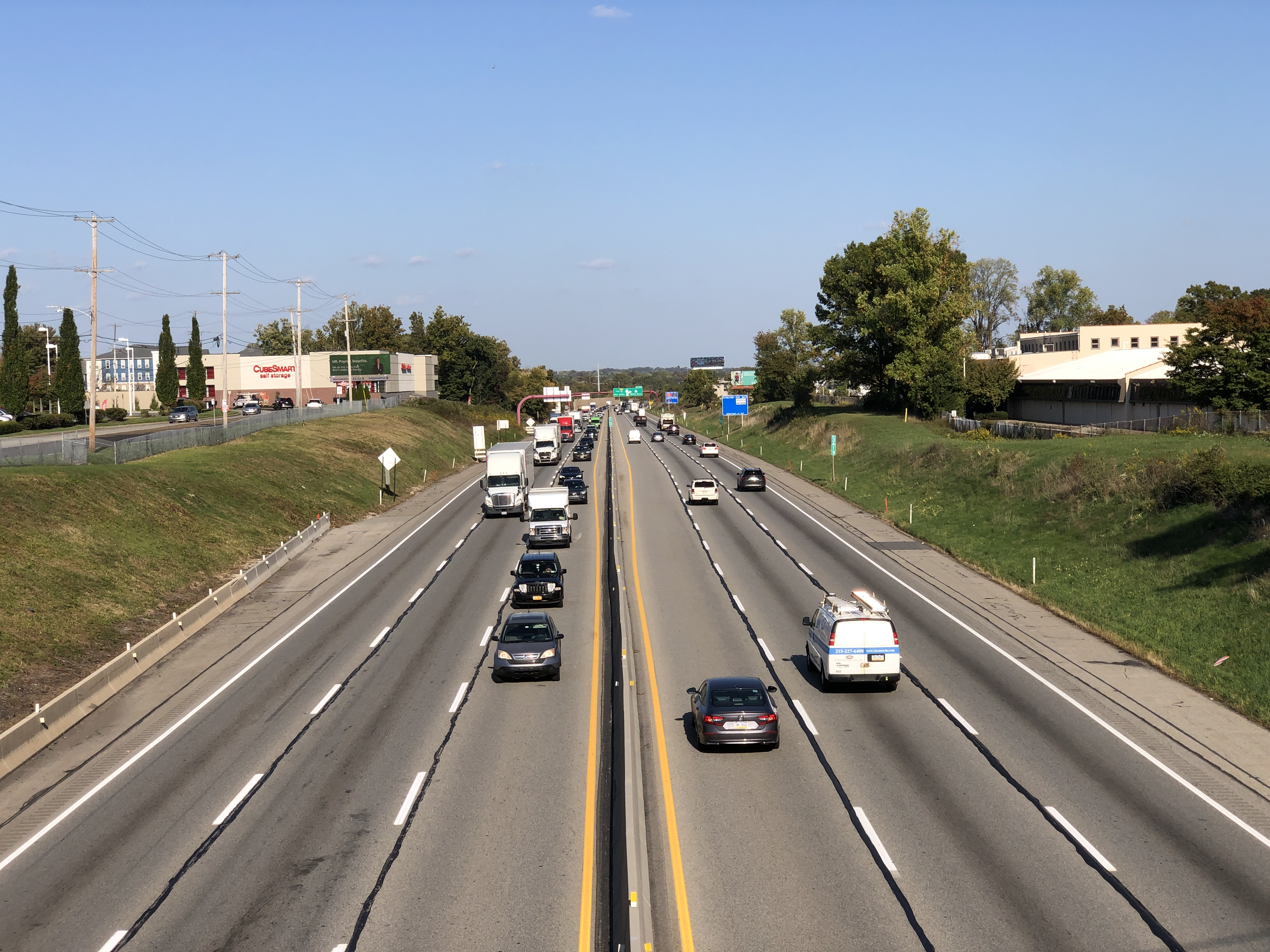
View east along the Pennsylvania Turnpike/I-276 in Upper Moreland Township

As of 2018, 85.02 miles (136.83 km) of public roads were in Upper Moreland Township, of which 4.00 miles (6.44 km) were maintained by the Pennsylvania Turnpike Commission, 15.51 miles (24.96 km) were maintained by the Pennsylvania Department of Transportation, and 65.51 miles (105.43 km) were maintained by the township.

Major highways serving Upper Moreland Township include the east–west Pennsylvania Turnpike (Interstate 276), with the Willow Grove interchange located within the township, and Pennsylvania Route 611 (Easton Road), which links the area with Doylestown to the north and Philadelphia to the south and connects to the Pennsylvania Turnpike at the Willow Grove interchange. Other important roadways in the township are Pennsylvania Route 263 (York Road), Pennsylvania Route 63 (Moreland Road), County Line Road, Davisville Road, Byberry Road, Fitzwatertown Road, Terwood Road and Blair Mill Road.

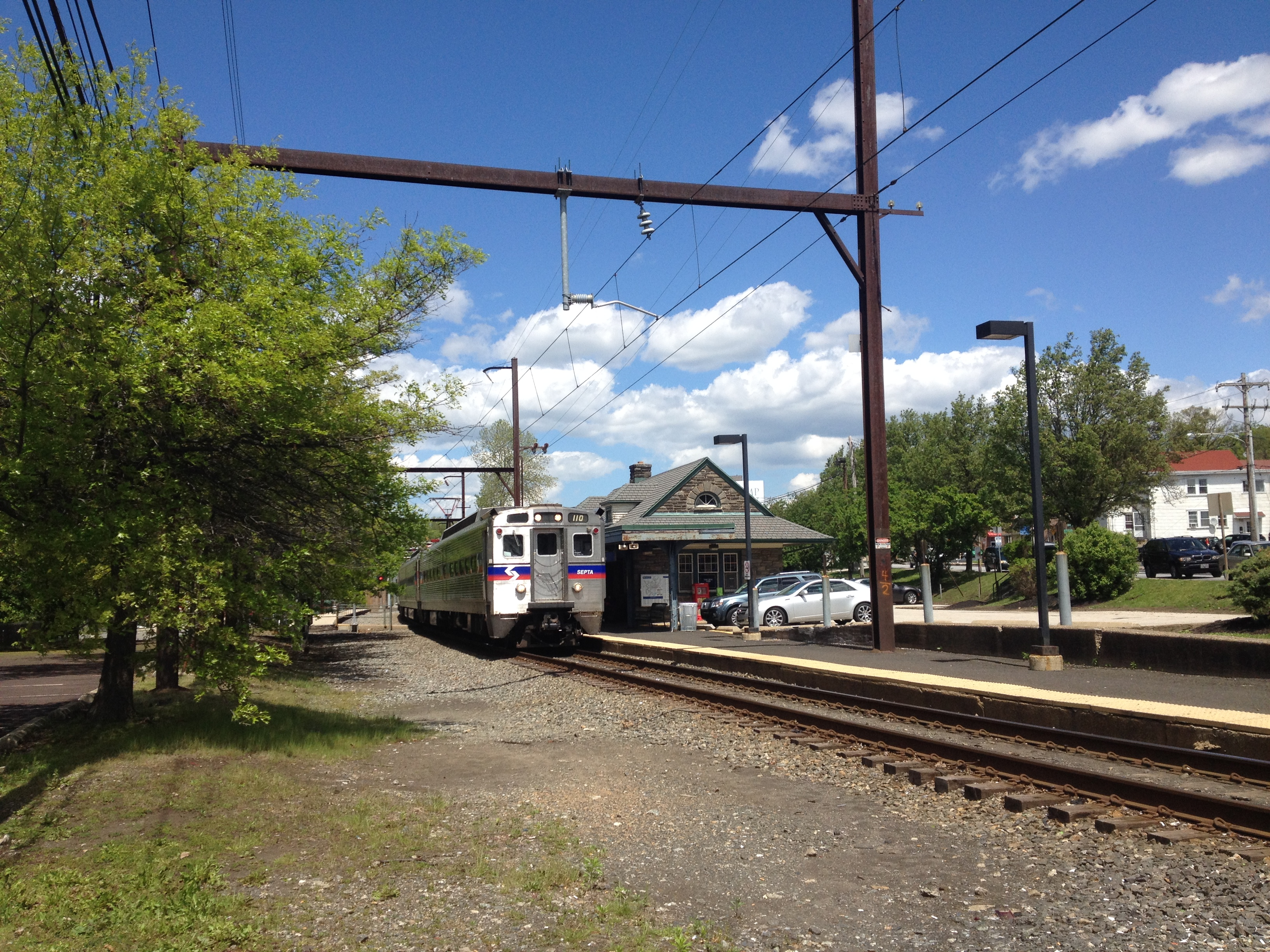
A SEPTA Regional Rail train on the Warminster Line stops at the Willow Grove station in Upper Moreland Township.

Commuter rail and bus services within Upper Moreland Township are provided by the Southeastern Pennsylvania Transportation Authority (SEPTA). The Warminster Line of SEPTA Regional Rail stops at the Willow Grove station within the township, running between Warminster Township and Center City Philadelphia. Multiple SEPTA bus routes serve the township, providing access to business parks and shopping centers and connecting to Philadelphia and other suburbs. Bus routes serving Upper Moreland Township include SEPTA City Bus Routes 22, 55, and 310 and SEPTA Suburban Bus Route 95.

Norfolk Southern Railway's Morrisville Line freight railroad line passes through Upper Moreland Township, running parallel to the south of the Pennsylvania Turnpike.

=== Utilities ===
Electricity and natural gas in Upper Moreland Township are provided by PECO Energy Company, a subsidiary of Exelon. Water in the township is provided by Aqua Pennsylvania, a subsidiary of Aqua America. The Upper Moreland-Hatboro Joint Sewer Authority provides sewage service to Upper Moreland Township along with neighboring Hatboro. The Upper Moreland Township Public Works Department provides trash collection and recycling to the township. Cable, telephone, and internet service to the area is provided by Xfinity and Verizon. Upper Moreland Township is served by area codes 215, 267, and 445.

=== Health care ===
Jefferson Health–Abington operates the Jefferson Health–Willow Grove (formerly Abington Health Center–Willow Grove) health center in the Willow Grove section of the township. The health center, which was founded in 1983, consists of four buildings and offers outpatient hospital services including healthcare programs, medical and administrative offices, and conference and educational facilities.

== Education ==
Upper Moreland Township is served by the Upper Moreland School District. The district consists of Upper Moreland Primary School for grades K-2, Upper Moreland Intermediate School for grades 3–5, Upper Moreland Middle School for grades 6–8, and Upper Moreland High School for grades 9-12.

The area Catholic school is Queen of Angels Regional Catholic School in Willow Grove and Upper Moreland Township, Pennsylvania. Queen of Angels was formed in 2012 by the merger of St. David in Willow Grove and Our Lady Help of Christians in Abington.
