= Moreland Township, Montgomery County, Pennsylvania =

Coordinates: 40.1523°N 75.1176°W

Moreland Township, is a defunct township that was located in Montgomery County, Pennsylvania. It was founded in 1682 and named by William Penn after Nicholas More, a London physician. In 1916 Bryn Athyn, Pennsylvania, in the middle of the township, separated for religious reasons. The following year, the remainder of the township separated into Lower Moreland Township and Upper Moreland Township.
