= Northern Liberties Township, Pennsylvania =

Northern Liberties Township
- Former Township
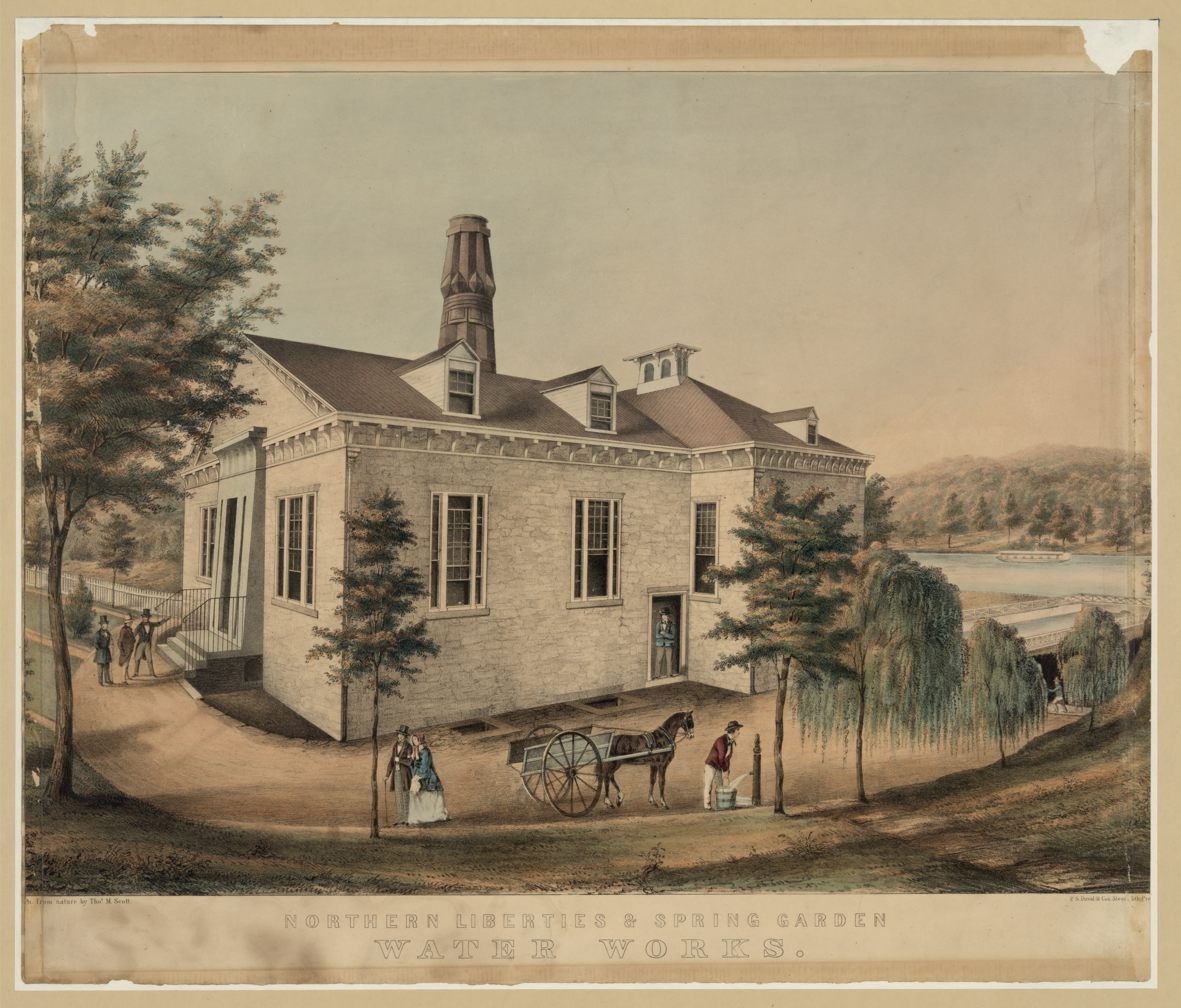
- Northern Liberties in the 1820s

- Location of Northern Liberties Township in Pennsylvania Northern Liberties Township (the United States)
- Coordinates: 39°57′43″N 75°08′16″W
- Country: United States
- State: Pennsylvania
- County: Philadelphia
- Time zone: UTC-5 (EST)
  - Summer (DST): UTC-4 (EDT)
- Area codes: 215, 267 and 445

Northern Liberties Township was a township that was located in Philadelphia County, Pennsylvania. The township was later incorporated into the City of Philadelphia after the passage of the Act of Consolidation, 1854.

== History ==
Historical population
Year	Pop.	±%
1790	9,913	—
1800	10,718	+8.1%
1810	19874	—
1820	19678	—
1830	28872	—
1840	34474	—
1850	47223	—

The Liberties was a term applied by William Penn to certain tracts of land lying north and west of the city. It contained what was called "the liberty land or free lots" because the proprietaries gave to the first purchaser of ground in the colony, according to the extent of his purchase, a portion of the land within those limits free of price. The original idea of Penn was to lay out a great town of 10,000 acres (16 sq mi; 40 km^{2}); but when the commissioners came to survey this space of ground it was found somewhat difficult, and when Penn arrived in 1682 he determined to divide the great town into two parts, one to be called the city and the other the Liberties. The city contained about 1,820 acres (2.84 sq mi; 7.4 km^{2}). The Liberties extended north of Vine Street to the mouth of Cohocksink Creek and up the same so as to go round the lands of Jurian Hartsfelder, which had already been granted away before Penn came to the colony.

There were Swedish, Dutch, and English grants of land made before Penn came to be proprietor that had to be respected, so that the Liberty lands were very irregular in their boundaries, and ran by various courses along the Cohocksink, Wissinoming, Tacony, Wingohocking and other streams, and Germantown and Bristol townships, to the Schuylkill, and over the same and out to Cobbs Creek, and down the same and along the west side of the Schuylkill to a point opposite Vine Street, at the north city line, and along the same to the place of beginning. This survey was made in 1682, and the Liberties contained on the east side of the Schuylkill, 9,161 acres (14.314 sq mi; 37.07 km^{2}); west side, 7,074 acres (11.053 sq mi; 28.63 km^{2}); total, 16,235 acres (25.367 sq mi; 65.70 km^{2}). These liberty lands on the east side of the Schuylkill became a township nearly from the time of survey, and were called the Northern Liberties, while the western Liberties, beyond the Schuylkill, became a portion of the township of Blockley.

The territory between the Delaware and Schuylkill was subsequently divided; the western part was called Penn township, and the eastern part was sometimes called the Unincorporated Northern Liberties. Whenever so spoken of, the reference was to that portion of the township which had not been taken up by the formation of districts, and by the time of consolidation the area of the township was very small, the districts of Northern Liberties, Spring Garden, Kensington, Penn, Richmond and the township of Penn and the boroughs of Aramingo and Bridesburg, having been carved out of it. In 1854 the township or Unincorporated Northern Liberties was the space of land north of Kensington, west of Richmond and Aramingo, and a portion of Frankford, south of a portion of Oxford and Bristol townships, and east of Penn township. A part of it was west of the Frankford Road, and it was all east of Germantown Road.

In the 1790 census, the township was the sixth most populous urban place in the United States.

== Resources ==
- Chronology of the Political Subdivisions of the County of Philadelphia, 1683-1854 (Daly, John; Weinberg, Allen (October 1966). Genealogy of Philadelphia County Subdivisions (Second ed.). Philadelphia Dept. of Records.)
- Information courtesy of ushistory.org
- Incorporated District, Boroughs, and Townships in the County of Philadelphia, 1854 By Rudolph J. Walther - excerpted from the book at the ushistory.org website
