= Philadelphia nativist riots =

1844 riots in Pennsylvania, US

Coordinates: 39.9736°N 75.1386°W

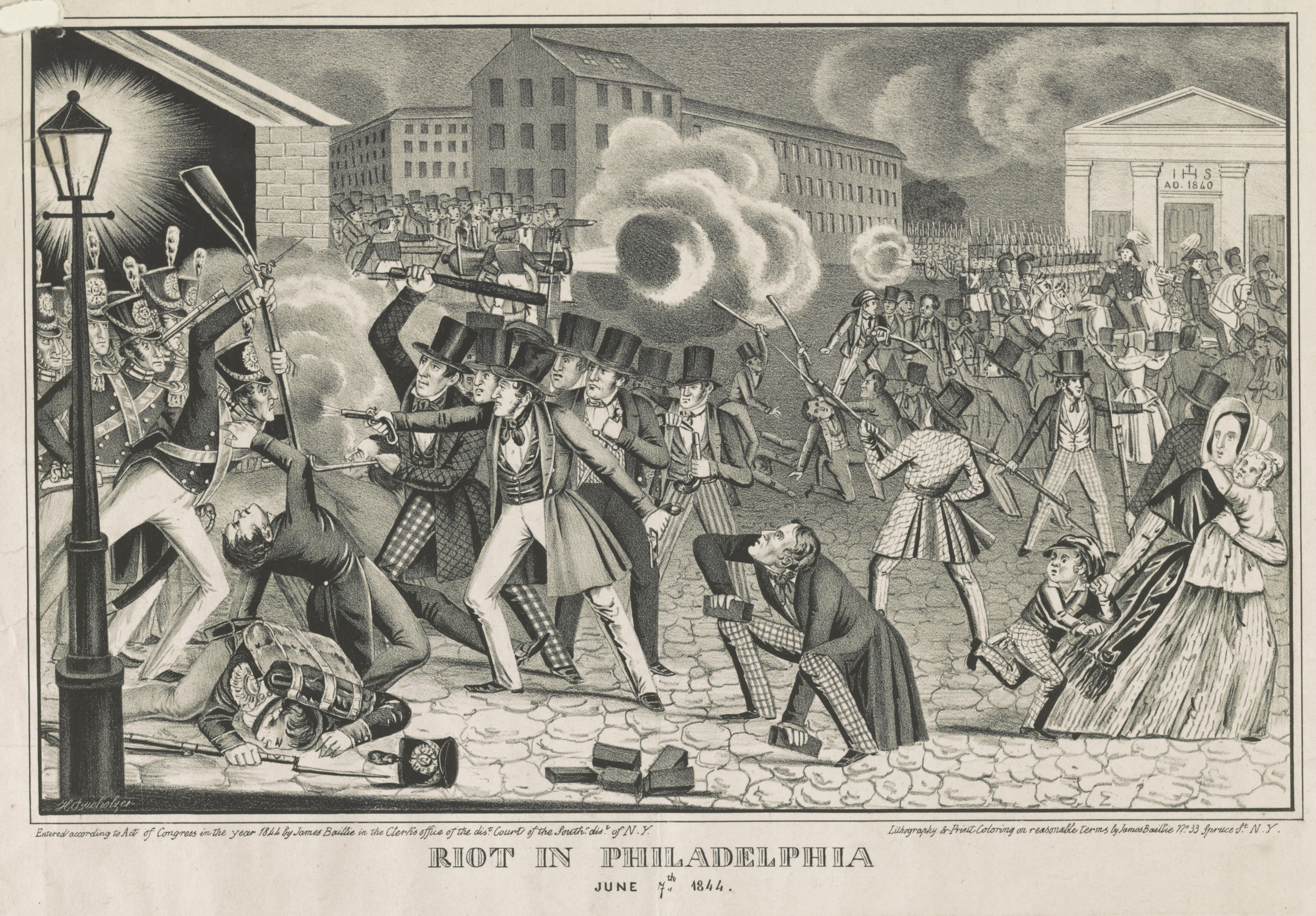
- State militia (left) firing at nativist rioters July 7, 1844, in Southwark
- Date: First riot: May 6–8, 1844 (3 days); Second riot: July 6–7, 1844 (1 day)
- Location: Philadelphia, Pennsylvania
- Caused by: Anti-Catholicism; Anti-Irish sentiment Nativism; Instability (political and economic)
- Result: Politicization of the event Build-up of government forces

Parties
Pennsylvania: Pennsylvania State Militia	Rioters

Lead figures
(Pennsylvania) David R. Porter (Pennsylvania) Robert Patterson	Lewis Charles Levin

Casualties
- Deaths: 20+

The Philadelphia nativist riots (also known as the Philadelphia Prayer Riots, the Bible Riots and the Native American Riots) were a series of riots that took place on May 6–8 and July 6–7, 1844, in Philadelphia, Pennsylvania, United States and the adjacent districts of Kensington and Southwark. The riots were a result of rising anti-Catholic sentiment at the growing population of Irish Catholic immigrants. The government brought in over a thousand militia—they confronted the nativist mobs and killed or wounded hundreds of anti-Catholic rioters.

In the five months leading to the riots, nativist groups had been spreading a false rumor that Catholics were trying to remove the Bible from public schools. A nativist rally in Kensington erupted in violence on May 6 and started a deadly riot that would result in the destruction of two Catholic churches and numerous other buildings. Riots erupted again in July after it was discovered that St. Philip Neri's Catholic Church in Southwark had armed itself for protection. Fierce fighting broke out between the nativists and the soldiers sent to protect the church, resulting in numerous deaths and injuries. Two of the 13 Catholic churches were burned. The Catholic Church sued the city and won some money for repairs. Civic leaders deplored the nativist attacks. Nationally, the riots helped fuel criticism of the nativist movement, despite denials of responsibility from nativist groups. The riots exposed deficiencies in law enforcement in Philadelphia and the surrounding districts, influencing various reforms in local police departments and the eventual consolidation of the city in 1854.

== Background ==
Bishop Francis Kenrick

As Philadelphia became industrialized, immigrants from Europe, mostly Ireland and Germany, settled in the city and especially in the surrounding districts (like London, the city proper was small, but surrounded by essentially indistinguishable suburbs). In the areas the immigrants settled, tensions that resulted from religious, economic and cultural differences grew between residents. Most new arrivals were Catholic.

Historian Elizabeth Geffen states:

these new arrivals, impoverished, unskilled, and Catholic, immediately confronted an ancient enemy, the Protestant Scotch-Irish, longtime resident in Philadelphia, proud of their "in" status, mostly skilled workers, and ready, eager, and able to renew the political, economic, social, and religious feuds of the old country. During the 1830s they had organized an Orange Society for that express purpose.

Alarmed by the rising Catholic population, Protestants and native-born Americans started organizing anti-Catholic and nativist groups. On August 26, 1842, an anonymous arsonist set ablaze the bridge of the Philadelphia and Reading Railroad Company. Immediately the responsibility was attributed to the local Irish Catholic community, sparking the founding of a Protestant Institute. The group, alongside others established in the early 1840s, distributed anti-Catholic literature and published anti-Catholic newspapers.

During the 1840s, students in Philadelphia schools began the day with reading the Protestant version of the Bible. On November 10, 1842, Philadelphia's Roman Catholic Bishop, Francis Kenrick, wrote a letter to the Board of Controllers of public schools, asking that Catholic children be allowed to read the Douay version of the Bible, used by Roman Catholics. He also asked that they be excused from other religious teachings while at school. As a result, the Board of Controllers ordered that no child should be forced to participate in religious activities and stated that children were allowed to read whichever version of the Bible their parents wished. Nativists further inflamed hostile feelings towards Catholics by reportedly twisting Kenrick's requests to the Board of Controllers as an attack against the Bible used in Protestant devotionals.

Approximately one year later, a rumor was circulated that Hugh Clark, a Catholic Kensington school director, was visiting a girls school, where he demanded that the principal stop Bible reading in school. The story also claimed that the principal refused and that she would rather lose her job. Clark denied this version of events and claimed that after finding out several students had left a Bible reading to read a different version of the Bible, he commented that if reading the Bible caused such confusion, it would be better if it were not to be read in school. Protestants claimed that Catholics, with direct influence from the Pope, were trying to remove the Bible from schools. Kenrick issued a statement asserting, "It is not consistent with the laws and the discipline of the Catholic Church for her members to unite in religious exercises with those who are not of their communion."

Historian David Montgomery argues that the Irish Catholic Democrats in the city had successfully appealed to the upper-class Whig leadership. The Whigs wanted to split the Democratic coalition, so they approved Bishop Kenrick's request that Catholic children be allowed to use their own Bible. That approval outraged the evangelical Protestant leadership, which rallied its support in Philadelphia. Montgomery wrote:

The school controversy, however, had united 94 leading clergymen of the city in a common pledge to strengthen Protestant education and "awaken the attention of the community to the dangers which ... threaten these United States from the assaults of Romanism." The American Tract Society took up the battle cry and launched a national crusade to save the nation from the "spiritual despotism" of Rome. The whole Protestant edifice of churches, Bible societies, temperance societies, and missionary agencies was thus interposed against Catholic electoral maneuvers ... at the very moment when those maneuvers were enjoying some success.

== May riot ==
On May 3, 1844, the American Republican Party (a precursor of the American "Know-Nothing" Party, a Protestant nativist group, which would be founded a decade later) held a meeting in a predominantly Irish part of the Kensington District, then a suburb of Philadelphia. A group of Irish residents attacked the platform where the speakers were standing, and the nativists retreated.

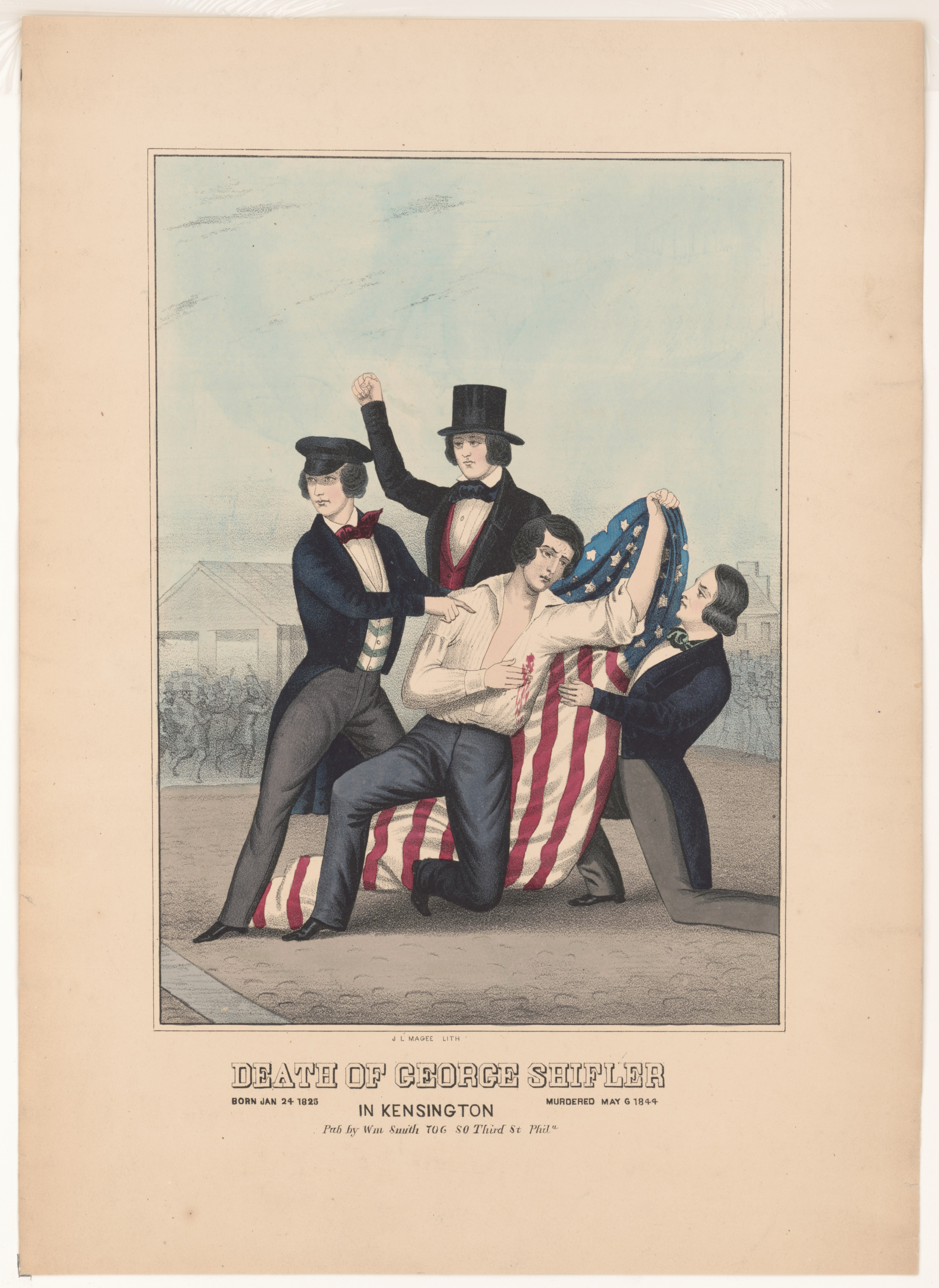
George Shifler

On May 6, nativists returned in greater numbers. During the rally, it began to rain, and the meeting was moved into a nearby market. The inflammatory remarks continued inside the market, where fighting broke out between the local Irish Catholics and the nativists. Fighting spilled outside the market, where nativists were shot at by people in the windows of nearby buildings. One or two nativists were reportedly killed. George Shiffler, an 18-year-old leatherworker, was the first nativist killed in the riots of 1844. A mob of nativists attacked the Seminary of the Sisters of Charity and several Catholic homes before the riot ended. Numerous people were injured, and two more nativists were killed.

The district constable was powerless to stop the violence. In the 1840s, most suburban districts of Philadelphia were policed by elected constables and part-time watchmen. When violence erupted in a district, the time-consuming process involved the constable summoning the county sheriff Morton McMichael, who would organize a posse. During the May 6 violence, the posse arrived armed only with clubs and was powerless to do anything.

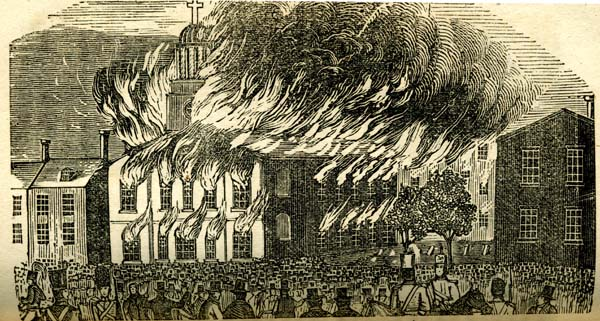
St. Augustine's Church on fire

On May 7, nativists denounced Catholics and called on Americans to defend themselves from "the bloody hand of the Pope." A mob marched to Kensington, where they carried the American flag and a banner bearing the inscription: "This is the flag that was trampled by Irish papist." When they reached Kensington gunfire immediately broke out between nativists and Catholics. During the riot, nativist mobs set fire to and destroyed the Hibernia fire station, thirty homes, and the market where the violence had begun the day before. Joseph Rice, described as a bystander, was shot dead; he is the only known Catholic killed. The violence did not end until the local state militia, commanded by General George Cadwalader, arrived and dispersed the crowd. Kenrick quickly issued a statement instructing Catholics to avoid violence and confrontations.

After a brief lull, the violence continued on May 8. The nativists came back to Kensington and burned down St. Michael's Catholic Church and rectory at Second and Jefferson Streets, the Seminary of the Sisters of Charity, which had been attacked a few days before, and several homes were attacked before soldiers arrived and the fire was contained. While the riot was contained in Kensington, another nativist mob had gathered within the borders of Philadelphia itself. They gathered at St. Augustine's Catholic Church, located on Fourth Street between Vine and New Streets. City troops were stationed by the church, and Mayor John Morin Scott pleaded for calm. The rioters threw stones at the mayor, ignored the troops, and burned down the church, cheering when the steeple fell. A nearby school with a collection of rare books was also set aflame. The rioters did not attack an unfinished German Catholic church.

During the riots, at least fourteen were killed, an estimated fifty people were injured, two hundred fled their homes, and damage totaled $150,000. This is equivalent to $5.18 million in 2016 USD.

In the days afterward, Mayor Scott set up a force to protect Catholic churches, and Bishop Kenrick ordered all churches to be closed the following Sunday to avoid any provocation and possible violence. Valuables were removed from the churches and hidden in homes for safekeeping. Bishop Kenrick asked Catholics to offer no resistance and urged them to wait for the law to deal with the rioters. However, in its June 18 report, a grand jury blamed an imperfect response by law enforcement and the Irish Catholics for the riots, stating that the outbreak of violence was due to "the efforts of a portion of the community to exclude the Bible from the public schools" and the disruption of legitimate meetings by immigrants.

Nativists said they were only responding to attacks and were justified in their actions but were not responsible for the riots after May 6. The American Republican Party issued a statement blaming Mayor Scott, the sheriff, and the civil authorities for the riots.

== July riot ==
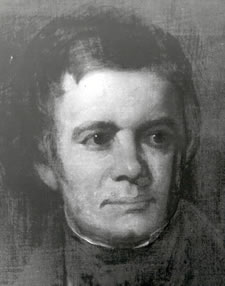
Governor David R. Porter allowed St. Philip Neri's church to create an arsenal.

On July 3, Father John Patrick Dunn of the Church of St. Philip Neri in the Southwark District was warned that the church might be attacked during an upcoming parade held by the Native American Party. The Native American Party, a nativist political party, planned to hold a large parade the next day on Independence Day.

To prepare for violence, the church applied for an arsenal that a volunteer company would use in case the church was attacked. Pennsylvania Governor David R. Porter authorized the formation of a company and the procurement of twenty-five muskets from the Frankford Arsenal. Major General Robert Patterson, commander of the Pennsylvania militia, put the troops on alert in case of violence.

Five of the muskets placed in St. Philip Neri's Church were discovered to be defective and were sent back to the Frankford Arsenal to be repaired. No violence occurred before or during the parade, but on July 5, a nativist mob numbering in the thousands gathered at the church after some observed five defective muskets being returned to the church. They then demanded that the sheriff remove the weapons, while Father Dunn and volunteers rallied to protect the church. Sheriff Morton McMichael and two aldermen searched the church and removed twelve muskets. After leaving the church, the sheriff urged the crowd to disperse and left a volunteer posse to guard the church. The mob remained, and a man injured in the May riots made a speech to the crowd, calling for a second search of the church. The sheriff, an alderman, and seventeen nativists entered the church and found three armed men, fifty-three muskets, ten pistols, a keg of gunpowder and ammunition. To avoid inciting the mob, the sheriff decided not to remove the armaments, and the search party stayed in the church. Just after midnight, July 6, Major General Patterson ordered a company of city guards to clear the streets. After the crowd dispersed, the arms found within the church were removed.

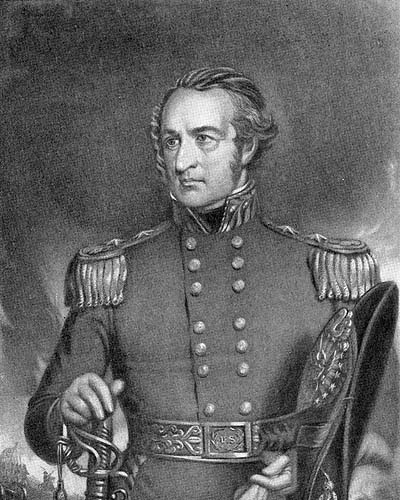
Major General Robert Patterson

By midday, the crowds returned around St. Philip Neri's Church. General George Cadwalader ordered the crowds to disperse, but they did not. By the evening, the sheriff had arrived with a 150-strong posse. Throughout the evening, the military presence grew, and three cannons were stationed on the streets. The soldiers cleared the streets near the church, despite being pelted with rocks by the mob. Responding to the rock throwers, General Cadwalader ordered a cannon to be fired at the crowd on Third Street. Former U.S. Congressman Charles Naylor begged the general not to fire; he and several others were arrested and held within the church. By the morning of July 7, most of the soldiers had left, but the crowds, led by an alderman and the sheriff, returned and demanded that the remaining guard release Naylor. Everyone except Naylor was released. The crowds grew, and a cannon was brought from a nearby wharf and used to threaten the church. After further negotiations, Naylor was released and carried home to cheers on people's shoulders.

After Naylor was brought home, the mob attacked the church, damaging a wall with the cannon. A second cannon was brought from the wharfs and fired at the church, after which the mob pelted the building with rocks and broke in through a side door. The soldiers fired on the men breaking into the church, who promptly retreated. After retreating, the nativists negotiated with the guard, who agreed to withdraw, allowing the nativists to guard the church. The crowd pelted the soldiers with rocks and some soldiers fired back, which only incited the mob further. The mob forced its way into the church, causing extensive damage to the interior. After about an hour, a group of twenty men organized themselves to guard St. Philip Neri's, and the mob left the church.

By the evening, a large number of soldiers arrived with orders to clear the streets, only to be stoned in the process. After a captain was attacked, the order was given to fire on the mob, which resulted in seven fatalities and nine injuries. Not long after, people with muskets and cannons arrived, and fierce fighting broke out between the soldiers and the mob. The fighting lasted for several hours, with the soldiers being fired upon from alleyways and the windows of nearby buildings. The soldiers brought in two cannons of their own and fired on the mob; the mob returned fire using their own cannons, armed with items such as nails, chains, knives and broken bottles. In an attempt to capture the mob's cannons, soldiers charged one cannon's position, only to be knocked off their horses by a rope tied across the street. The cannons were all eventually captured, and by early morning on July 8, the fighting had ended.

At least fifteen people, including rioters and soldiers, were killed in the riot, and at least fifty people were injured. Under Governor Porter's orders, state troops continued to arrive in the city in the days afterward, but no further violence took place. An estimated 5,000 militia were used to stop violence. Troops began to withdraw from the city on July 10, and the church took over responsibility from the district of Southwark of protecting the church on July 11. As with the May riots, a grand jury blamed the Irish Catholics for the riots, but supported the military's response to the violence.

== Aftermath ==
The riots had gained national attention and condemnation. The riots were used as an issue in the 1844 U.S. Presidential election, the Democratic Party condemning the growing Native American Party and the Whig Party, which the Democrats accused of involvement in the nativist movement. In Philadelphia, the Native American Party ended up making a strong showing in the city's October election. In New York City, many feared that nativists would target New York City's Catholic churches. Archbishop John Hughes organized defenders for the churches and told the mayor that if any Catholic churches were burned, "New York would be another Moscow."

On July 11, 1844, Philadelphia passed an ordinance that gave the city a battalion of artillery, a regiment of infantry, and at least one full troop of cavalry to preserve peace within the city when necessary. The difficulty of quelling the riots and other crime led the Pennsylvania General Assembly to pass an 1845 act that required Philadelphia, the township of Moyamensing and the unincorporated districts of Spring Garden, Northern Liberties, and Penn to maintain a police force of one man per 150 taxable inhabitants. In 1850, another act was passed that established that the Philadelphia police force would police the city and seven surrounding districts. The inability to maintain order effectively in Philadelphia's suburbs would be an important argument for the consolidation of the city in 1854.

After the riots, Bishop Kenrick ended his efforts to influence the public education system and began encouraging the creation of Catholic schools, with 17 being founded by 1860. The friars of the Church of St. Augustine sued the city of Philadelphia for not providing the church with adequate protection, claiming $80,000 in damages. The city argued that the friars could not claim their civil rights were violated, as the Order of St. Augustine was a foreign organization under the Pope. Furthermore, the city argued that the friars took a vow of poverty and could not be property owners. The Augustinians ended up proving the order had been incorporated in 1804 and were awarded $45,000. The church was rebuilt in 1848.

== Military casualties ==
Among the military forces, the riots resulted in two killings, one additional death and 23 others wounded. The following were wounded unless otherwise noted as killed.

Casualty of the May 1844 Riot:

- State Fencibles: 2nd Lt. John S. Dutton (also Adjutant 1st Regiment of City Volunteers) died May 4, 1844, of typhoid and inflammation of the lungs from exposure

Casualties of the July 1844 Riot:

- Germantown Blues: Lt. William L. Cox; Cpl. Henry Troutman (killed); Pvt. Ashworth; Pvt. Ent; Pvt. John Guyer (killed); Pvt. Osborne
- Washington Artillery: Col. Augustus Pleasonton; Capt. R.K. Scott; Pvt. Crawford (lost an arm)
- Cadwalader Grays: Sgt. Starr
- Philadelphia Grays: Pvt. James Schreiner; Pvt. James Woodlrige
- State Fencibles: Sgt. Thomas Marston; Pvt. Jos. Hesser
- Wayne Artillery: Pvt. R.G. Bull; Pvt. C. Dougherty; Pvt. S.F. Williams
- City Guards: Capt. Hill; Corporal Russell; Pvt. S. Morrison; Pvt. Henry Myers
- Washington Cavalry: Sgt. Wagner; Corporal Verrig; Pvt. Charles Livezey; Pvt. Charles Williams

== See also ==
- List of incidents of civil unrest in the United States
- Lombard Street riot, of 1842
- 1964 Philadelphia race riot
- Philadelphia Election riot, of 1742
- Lewis Charles Levin
