= Northern Liberties, Pennsylvania =

Northern Liberties, Pennsylvania may refer to

- Northern Liberties Township, Pennsylvania - a township which was incorporated into Philadelphia in 1854
- Northern Liberties, Philadelphia, Pennsylvania - a neighborhood of Philadelphia which was part of the defunct township
