= Aramingo Borough, Pennsylvania =

Aramingo Borough
- Former Borough
- Location of Aramingo in Pennsylvania Aramingo Borough (the United States)
- Coordinates: 40°00′18″N 75°05′02″W
- Country: United States
- State: Pennsylvania
- County: Philadelphia
- Time zone: UTC-5 (EST)
  - Summer (DST): UTC-4 (EDT)
- Area codes: 215, 267, and 445

Aramingo Borough was a borough that was located in Philadelphia County, Pennsylvania, United States. The borough ceased to exist and was incorporated into the City of Philadelphia following the passage of the Act of Consolidation, 1854.

== History ==
Aramingo Borough was created out of the Northern Liberties Township and was incorporated on April 11, 1850. Bounded on the northeast by a portion of the Bridesburg and Frankford Creek, which divided it from a portion of Oxford Township and Frankford; on the northwest the unincorporated Northern Liberties, and the Northern Liberties District were boundaries, the latter partly on the southwest; and Richmond District on the southeast and southwest.

The name is an abbreviation and alteration from the Native American name of the stream adjacent, called by the Swedes and English, Gunner’s Run. The original name was Tumanaraming, meaning "Wolf Walk." By cutting off the first five letters and adding an o at the end, the word "Aramingo" was coined.

Aramingo Avenue remains a major road in Port Richmond, Fishtown, and other neighborhoods in near Northeast Philadelphia. It is home to many stores and shopping plazas.

== Resources ==
- Chronology of the Political Subdivisions of the County of Philadelphia, 1683-1854 (Daly, John; Weinberg, Allen (October 1966). Genealogy of Philadelphia County Subdivisions (Second ed.). Philadelphia Dept. of Records.
- Information courtesy of ushistory.org
- Incorporated District, Boroughs, and Townships in the County of Philadelphia, 1854 By Rudolph J. Walther - excerpted from the book at the ushistory.org website
