= West Philadelphia, Pennsylvania =

West Philadelphia, Pennsylvania may refer to:

- West Philadelphia
- West Philadelphia Borough, Pennsylvania
