= Bristol Township, Philadelphia County, Pennsylvania =

Bristol Township
- Township
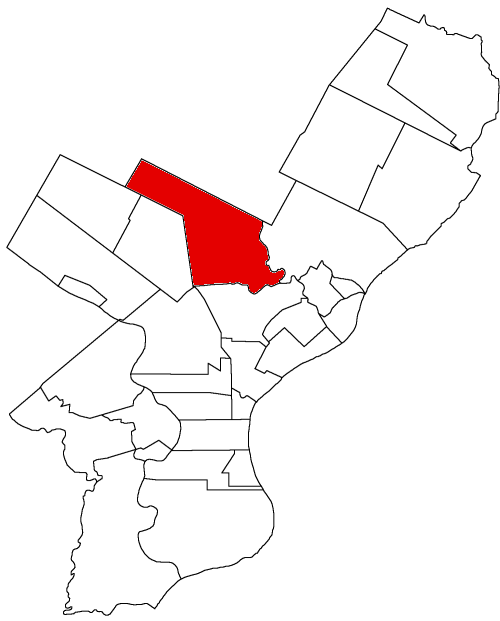
- Bristol Township (colored in red) prior to the Act of Consolidation in 1854
- Country: United States
- State: Pennsylvania
- County: Philadelphia
- Time zone: UTC-5 (EST)
  - Summer (DST): UTC-4 (EDT)
- Area codes: None, because the telephone had not been invented until long after it was consolidated into the City of Philadelphia.

Bristol Township was a township that was located in Philadelphia County, Pennsylvania. The township ceased to exist and was incorporated into the City of Philadelphia following the passage of the Act of Consolidation, 1854. It is geographically analogous to the modern day Olney-Oak Lane Planning Analysis Section. Its analogous section sits within the larger section of North Philadelphia, above Upper North Philadelphia and immediately east of the separate sections of Germantown and Chestnut Hill.

== History ==
Bristol Township was located at the north end of Philadelphia County, at the intersection of the angle which runs down from the extreme point between Philadelphia and Montgomery counties. It was of irregular form, and was bounded on the northwest by a portion of Springfield Township, Montgomery County; on the northeast by Cheltenham Township, Montgomery County. It extended along the latter to Oxford Township, but was bounded mainly on the east by Tacony Creek, on the south partly by the Wingohocking and the Northern Liberties Township, and on the west and southwest by Germantown Borough and Germantown Township.

The Old York Road ran through it to Branchtown and Milestown (now East Oak Lane), and thence to Bucks County. Greatest length, five and one-half miles; greatest breadth, three miles; area, 5,650 acres (23 km^{2}). The name is derived from the city of Bristol in England.

== Neighborhoods ==
- East Oak Lane
- Feltonville
- Fern Rock
- Koreatown
- Logan
- Melrose Park
- Ogontz
- Olney
- West Oak Lane
- Cedarbrook

== Resources ==
- Chronology of the Political Subdivisions of the County of Philadelphia, 1683–1854 (Daly, John; Weinberg, Allen (October 1966). Genealogy of Philadelphia County Subdivisions (Second ed.). Philadelphia Dept. of Records.)
- Information courtesy of ushistory.org
- Incorporated District, Boroughs, and Townships in the County of Philadelphia, 1854 By Rudolph J. Walther - excerpted from the book at the ushistory.org website
- Ellet, Charles, Jr. Map of the County of Philadelphia from Actual Survey, 1843.
