= Kensington District, Pennsylvania =

Kensington District
- Former Districting
- Location of Kensington District in Pennsylvania Kensington District (the United States)
- Coordinates: 39°58′51″N 75°07′20″W
- Country: United States
- State: Pennsylvania
- County: Philadelphia
- Time zone: UTC-5 (EST)
  - Summer (DST): UTC-4 (EDT)
- Area codes: 215, 267 and 445

Kensington District, or The Kensington District of the Northern Liberties, was one of the twenty-nine municipalities that formed Philadelphia County, Pennsylvania, United States prior to the enactment of the Act of Consolidation, 1854, when it became incorporated into the newly expanded City of Philadelphia. Lehigh Avenue roughly bounded the district to the north; Germantown Avenue and 6th Street to the west; Cohocksink Creek to the south; and an L-shaped line formed by Frankford Avenue, Norris Street, and York Street to its northeast. The Delaware River was the eastern boundary. Today the area would include the Philadelphia neighborhoods of Olde Kensington, West Kensington and Fishtown, as well as portions of the neighborhoods of Ludlow, Hartranft, Fairhill, Northern Liberties and the current Kensington. The District of Kensington was a self-governing district between the years 1820 and 1854.

== History ==
Historical population
Census	Pop.	Note	%±
1820	7,118		—
1830	13,394		88.2%
1840	22,314		66.6%
1850	46,774		109.6%

Captain Anthony Palmer originally laid out Kensington as a town in the 1730s. Palmer, an English merchant by way of Barbados, had come to colonial Pennsylvania about 1704, investing in land while continuing his mercantile business interests. He eventually turned to politics and was invited to join the Pennsylvania Council, which he did by 1710. When the local innkeeper Worthington put up the old Fairman Mansion for sale in 1729, Palmer purchased the mansion house and the surrounding 191½ acres and began laying out his town of Kensington, selling lots to a number of shipbuilders in nearby Philadelphia, who were looking to expand or enlarge their businesses. The town of Kensington started around shipbuilding and Shad fishing industries. (Fishtown was a small section of the original District of Kensington). Kensington was named for the monarch's residence in England, Kensington Palace. The early street names of Kensington also bore this out as they mimicked the titles of the crown; King Street (now Beach), Queen Street (now Richmond), Prince Street (now Girard Avenue) and Duke Street (now Thompson), etc. Due to his political longevity, Palmer eventually became the acting Governor of Pennsylvania in 1748-49, due to the absence of the governor who went back to England for health reasons. According to the research of Ken Milano, it was during Palmer's brief reign as acting governor that Kensington, for one day, was the working capital of the colony" the Council met there because Palmer, being old and infirm, was not able to travel into Philadelphia.

By 1820, Kensington started to acquire men of wealth, who petitioned the state to become a self-governing district within Philadelphia County, as at the time it was a part of the Northern Liberties Township. It was granted self-rule, and incorporated on March 6, 1820. For 34 years, Kensington was a self-governing district within the County of Philadelphia. In 1854, Kensington joined with the other towns, boroughs, and districts of Philadelphia County and consolidated with the City of Philadelphia. This was said to have been necessary due to utility and policing reasons (Kensington had been the scene of the start of the Anti-Irish Catholic Riots that occurred in Philadelphia County in May & July 1844).

Over the years the town of Kensington became quite successful and quite well known as the heart of Philadelphia's industrial heyday. When Philadelphians referred to things being "Made in Philadelphia", most of what they referred to was manufactured in Kensington. There was another saying that "If you can't get it at K & A (Kensington & Allegheny Avenues) you can't get." Kensington was the place where a number of notable industries were founded such as William Cramp Shipyard, John B. Stetson Hat Company, Schoenhut Toy Factory, Bromley Mills, and Disston’s Keystone Saw Works, amongst numerous other businesses. Before the Great Depression of the 1930s, Kensington at one time had 35,000 textile jobs alone.

== Presidents of the Board of Commissioners ==
	Name	Took office	Left office	Party
1	John C. Brown	May, 1820	August 10, 1832	
2	Henry Remmey, Jr.	October, 1832	October, 1834	
3	Mahlon Dungan	October, 1834	October, 1835	
	Henry Remmey, Jr. (2nd time)	October, 1835	June, 1836	
4	Abraham R. Eyre	June, 1836	May, 1840	
5	Peter Rambo	May, 1840	May, 1841	
6	Thomas H. Brittain	May, 1841	June, 1842	
7	John Robbins, Jr.	June, 1842	October, 1845	
8	Samuel T. Bodine	October, 1845	1847	
9	John P. Verree	1852	1854	
