= Philadelphia County, Pennsylvania =

County in Pennsylvania, United States

City and County of Philadelphia
- Consolidated city-county
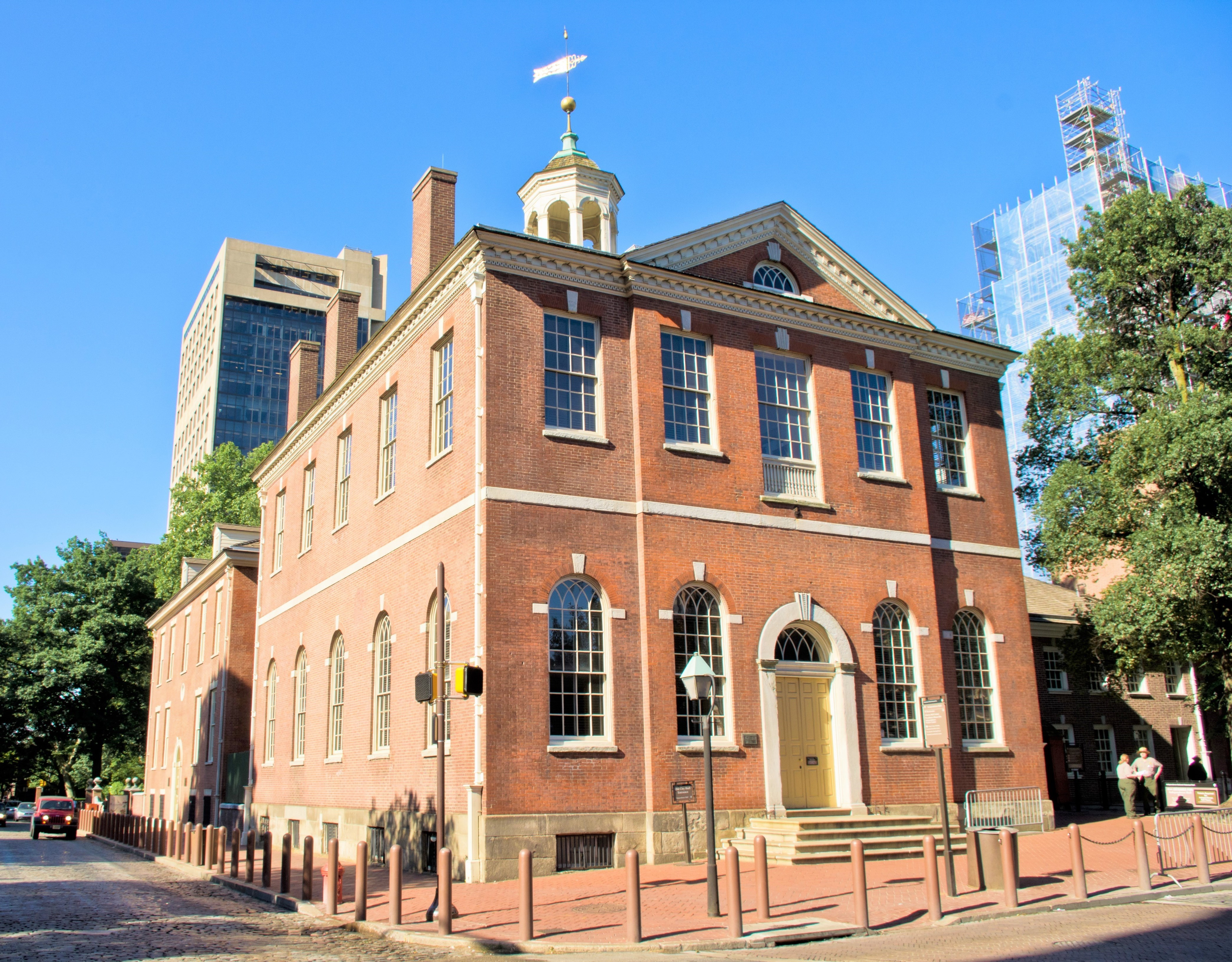
- Old City Hall in Philadelphia in June 2011

- Flag Seal

- Location within the U.S. state of Pennsylvania
- Coordinates: 40°01′N 75°08′W
- Country: United States
- State: Pennsylvania
- Founded: March 10, 1682
- Named for: City of Philadelphia
- Seat: Philadelphia
- Largest city: Philadelphia

Area
  - Total: 143 sq mi (370 km^{2})
  - Land: 134 sq mi (350 km^{2})
  - Water: 8.6 sq mi (22 km^{2}) 6.0%

Population
  - Total: 1,603,797
  - Estimate (2025): 1,574,281 ▼
  - Density: 11,969/sq mi (4,621/km^{2})
- Time zone: UTC−5 (Eastern)
  - Summer (DST): UTC−4 (EDT)
- Congressional districts: 2nd, 3rd, 5th
- Website: www.phila.gov

Philadelphia County is the most populous of the 67 counties of Pennsylvania and the 24th-most populous county in the nation. As of the 2020 census, the county had a population of 1,603,797. It is coextensive with Philadelphia, the nation's sixth-largest city. The county is part of the Southeast region of the commonwealth. (Note: Includes Philadelphia, Montgomery, Bucks, Delaware, Chester, Lehigh and Northampton Counties)

Philadelphia County is one of the three original counties, along with Chester and Bucks counties, founded by William Penn in November 1682. Since 1854, the county has been coextensive with the City of Philadelphia, which is also its county seat. Philadelphia County is the core county in the Philadelphia-Camden-Wilmington Combined Statistical Area (PA-NJ-DE-MD, located along the lower Delaware and Schuylkill Rivers, within the Northeast megalopolis).

Philadelphia County is the Delaware Valley's economic and cultural anchor and the ninth-largest combined statistical area in the nation with an estimated population of 7,493,171 as of 2025.

== History ==
Native American tribes of Lenape were the first known occupants in the area that became Philadelphia County. The first European settlers were Swedes and Finns who arrived in 1638. The Netherlands seized the area in 1655, but lost control to England in 1674. William Penn received his charter for Pennsylvania from Charles II of England in 1681, and in November 1682 he divided Pennsylvania into three counties. During the same year, Philadelphia was planned and was made the county seat and the capital of the Province of Pennsylvania.

Penn wanted Philadelphia, meaning "love brotherly", to be a place where religious tolerance and the freedom to worship were ensured. Philadelphia's name is shared with an ancient city in Asia Minor mentioned by the Bible's Book of Revelation. It was William Penn's desire, as a Quaker, that his "Holy Experiment" would be found blameless at the Last Judgment.

=== 18th century ===
When established, Philadelphia County consisted mainly of the area from the Delaware River west between the Schuylkill River to the south and the border with Bucks County to the north; the western boundary was undefined. Two counties would be formed out of Philadelphia County, Berks County which was formed in 1752 (from parts of Chester, Lancaster, and Philadelphia counties), and Montgomery County established in 1784. From these separations and other border changes, the present-day boundaries of the county were established.

Philadelphia, as planned by Penn, comprised only that portion of the present-day city situated between South and Vine Streets and the Delaware and Schuylkill Rivers. Other settlements were made beyond the boundaries of the city, and in the course of time they became incorporated separately and had separate governments.

Several of these settlements were situated immediately contiguous to the City of Philadelphia, such as Southwark and Moyamensing in the south, the Northern Liberties District, Kensington, Spring Garden and Penn District to the north, and West Philadelphia and Blockley to the west — which combined with the City of Philadelphia formed practically one continuously urban area, the whole group being known abroad simply as Philadelphia.

Besides these, there were a number of other outlying townships, villages and settlements throughout the county. Over time, as the population expanded out from the City of Philadelphia, those closer to the City became absorbed into it.

During this period, the city government of Philadelphia and the county government of Philadelphia acted separately. By the mid-19th century, a more structured government bureaucracy was needed. A reform charter, on February 2, 1854, defined all the boroughs, townships and districts of the County of Philadelphia as being within the City of Philadelphia, thus abolishing the patchwork of cities, boroughs, and townships that had comprised Philadelphia County since its founding.

The city-county consolidation was a result of the inability of a colonial-type government by committees to adapt to the needs of a growing city for new public services, for example, better streets, police, transportation, sanitation, and schools.

The newly integrated districts had marked characteristics between them, but over time, after the consolidation, these characteristics were generally integrated into the City of Philadelphia. Presently, the names of some of these old districts survive as the names of neighborhoods in the city, with their boundaries roughly matching their historic boundaries.

In 1951, a new law known as the Home Rule Charter merged city and county offices completely. This new charter provided the city with a common structure and outlined the "strong mayor" form of government that is still used.

The county offices were merged with the city government in 1952, effectively eliminating the county as a government. Even though the county no longer has a government structure by law, in both the Unconsolidated Pennsylvania Statutes and The Philadelphia Code and Charter, the County of Philadelphia is still an entity within the Commonwealth of Pennsylvania. It is thus subject to the provisions and laws of the Commonwealth concerning counties. Exceptions include restrictions stated in the Home Rule Charter of Philadelphia, Act of Consolidation, 1854, and subsequent legislation. The county also is the only First Class County, meaning it had a population of 1.5 million or more at the last census, in the Commonwealth.

Philadelphia has become racially and ethnically diverse over the years, and this process continues. Since 1990, (the year that immigration began increasing), thousands of immigrants from Latin America, Asia and Europe have arrived in the county. Presently, the city has some of the largest Irish, Italian, German, Polish, Puerto Rican, Korean, Vietnamese, Russian, Ukrainian, Jamaican, Chinese, Arab, Thai, and Cambodian populations in America. The county has the fourth largest concentration of African Americans in North America, including large numbers of Liberians, Nigerians, and Sudanese. The Northeast section of the city, and more significantly the suburbs of Philadelphia, contain large numbers of Indian Americans and Mexicans.

At the 2010 census, the city was 41.0% White, 43.4% Black or African American, 0.5% American Indian or Alaskan Native, 6.3% Asian, 0.0% Native Hawaiian, 2.8% two or more race, and 5.9% were some other race. 12.3% of the population were Hispanic or Latino.

== Geography ==
According to the U.S. Census Bureau, Philadelphia County has a total area of 143 square miles (370 km^{2}), of which 134 square miles (350 km^{2}) is land and 8.6 square miles (22 km^{2}) (6.0%) is water. It is the second-smallest county in Pennsylvania by area. Bodies of water include the Delaware River, Schuylkill River, Cobbs Creek, Wissahickon Creek, and Pennypack Creek.

The lowest point in the county is 10 feet above sea level near Fort Mifflin in Southwest Philadelphia, at the convergence of the Delaware and Schuylkill Rivers. The highest point is in Chestnut Hill, at 432 feet above sea level, near Evergreen Place, just north and west of Evergreen Avenue. Philadelphia County is Pennsylvania's second smallest county by land area, after Montour County.

=== Adjacent counties ===
- Bucks County (northeast)
- Burlington County, New Jersey (east)
- Camden County, New Jersey (southeast)
- Gloucester County, New Jersey (south)
- Delaware County (southwest)
- Montgomery County (northwest)

=== Major roads and highways ===
- I-76
- I-95
- I-676
- US 1
- US 13
- US 30
- PA 3
- PA 63
- PA 73
- PA 232
- PA 291
- PA 309
- PA 532
- PA 611

== Demographics ==
Historical population
Census	Pop.	Note	%±
1790	54,391		—
1800	81,009		48.9%
1810	111,210		37.3%
1820	137,097		23.3%
1830	188,797		37.7%
1840	258,037		36.7%
1850	408,762		58.4%
1860	565,529		38.4%
1870	674,022		19.2%
1880	847,170		25.7%
1890	1,046,964		23.6%
1900	1,293,697		23.6%
1910	1,549,008		19.7%
1920	1,823,779		17.7%
1930	1,950,961		7.0%
1940	1,931,334		−1.0%
1950	2,071,605		7.3%
1960	2,002,512		−3.3%
1970	1,948,609		−2.7%
1980	1,688,609		−13.3%
1990	1,585,577		−6.1%
2000	1,517,550		−4.3%
2010	1,526,006		0.6%
2020	1,603,797		5.1%
2025 (est.)	1,574,281	▼	−1.8%
U.S. Decennial Census; 1790–1960 1900–1990; 1990–2000 2010–2019 2020 census

=== 2020 census ===
As of the 2020 census, the county had a population of 1,603,797. The median age was 34.8 years. 20.3% of residents were under the age of 18 and 14.3% of residents were 65 years of age or older. For every 100 females there were 90.2 males, and for every 100 females age 18 and over there were 86.9 males age 18 and over.

The racial makeup of the county was 36.3% White, 39.3% Black or African American, 0.4% American Indian and Alaska Native, 8.3% Asian, 0.1% Native Hawaiian and Pacific Islander, 8.7% from some other race, and 6.9% from two or more races. Hispanic or Latino residents of any race comprised 14.9% of the population.

100.0% of residents lived in urban areas, while <0.1% lived in rural areas.

There were 658,075 households in the county, of which 26.6% had children under the age of 18 living in them. Of all households, 27.3% were married-couple households, 24.2% were households with a male householder and no spouse or partner present, and 40.3% were households with a female householder and no spouse or partner present. About 35.5% of all households were made up of individuals and 11.5% had someone living alone who was 65 years of age or older.

There were 726,797 housing units, of which 9.5% were vacant. Among occupied housing units, 48.2% were owner-occupied and 51.8% were renter-occupied. The homeowner vacancy rate was 1.7% and the rental vacancy rate was 7.3%.

=== 2000 census ===
At the 2000 census, there were 1,517,550 people, 590,071 households and 352,272 families residing in the county. The population density was 11,233.6 per square mile (4,337.3/km^{2}). There were 661,958 housing units, with an average density of 4,900.1 per square mile (1,891.9/km^{2}). and the racial composition of the county was 45.0% White, 43.2% African American, 5.5% Asian, 0.3% Native American, 0.1% Pacific Islander, 5.8% from other races, and 2.2% from two or more races. Hispanic or Latino of any race were 8.5% of the population. The five largest ancestries include Irish (13.6%), Italian (9.2%), German (8.1%), Polish (4.3%), and English (2.9%).

Of the 590,071 households, 27.6% had children under the age of 18 living with them, 32.1% were married couples living together, 22.3% had a female householder with no husband present, and 40.3% were non-families. 33.8% of all households were made up of individuals, and 11.9% had someone living alone who was 65 years of age or older. The average household size was 2.48 and the average family size was 3.22.

25.3% of the population were under the age of 18, 11.1% from 18 to 25, 29.3% from 25 to 45, 20.3% from 45 to 65, and 14.1% who were 65 years of age or older. The median age was 34 years. For every 100 females there were 86.8 males. For every 100 females age 18 and over, there were 81.8 males. The median household income was $30,746 and the median family income was $37,036. Males had a median income of $34,199 compared with $28,477 for females. The per capita income for the county was $16,509. About 18.4% of families and 22.9% of the population were below the poverty line, including 31.3% of those under age 18 and 16.9% of those age 65 or over.

=== Racial and ethnic composition ===
Philadelphia County, Pennsylvania – Racial and ethnic composition Note: the US Census treats Hispanic/Latino as an ethnic category. This table excludes Latinos from the racial categories and assigns them to a separate category. Hispanics/Latinos may be of any race.
Race / Ethnicity (NH = Non-Hispanic)	Pop 1980	Pop 1990	Pop 2000	Pop 2010	Pop 2020	% 1980	% 1990	% 2000	% 2010	% 2020
White alone (NH)	963,469	825,839	644,395	562,585	550,828	57.07%	52.08%	42.46%	36.87%	34.35%
Black or African American alone (NH)	633,485	623,510	646,123	644,287	613,835	37.52%	39.32%	42.58%	42.22%	38.27%
Native American or Alaska Native alone (NH)	2,325	3,144	2,908	3,498	2,596	0.14%	0.20%	0.19%	0.23%	0.16%
Asian alone (NH)	17,764	42,156	67,119	95,521	132,408	1.05%	2.66%	4.42%	6.26%	8.26%
Native Hawaiian or Pacific Islander alone (NH)	x	x	495	457	579	x	x	0.03%	0.03%	0.04%
Other race alone (NH)	7,597	1,735	2,856	4,105	11,419	0.45%	0.11%	0.19%	0.27%	0.71%
Mixed race or Multiracial (NH)	x	x	24,726	27,942	53,855	x	x	1.63%	1.83%	3.36%
Hispanic or Latino (any race)	63,570	89,193	128,928	187,611	238,277	3.77%	5.63%	8.50%	12.29%	14.86%
Total	1,688,210	1,585,577	1,517,550	1,526,006	1,603,797	100.00%	100.00%	100.00%	100.00%	100.00%

== Government ==
Philadelphia County has no government structure. Prior to the Act of Consolidation in 1854, a Board of Commissioners governed the county in accordance with the law of Pennsylvania at the time. The origins of the Board of Commissioners are found in the office of Tax Assessor of Philadelphia County, established by an Act of the Pennsylvania General Assembly on November 27, 1700. Tax Assessor was an office of six persons, elected annually to estimate the county's fiscal needs, to make an assessment and levy a tax to meet them, and to appoint its collectors and the County Treasurer.

On March 28, 1710, the Assembly approved an act that created an appointed Board of County Commissioners, which was changed to a notable elected board in 1725. The Commissioners were empowered to demand accountings of the Assessors and Collectors and to appoint new collectors if necessary. Subsequent acts passed by the Assembly in 1715, 1718 and 1722 increased the power and the scope of the Board, granting the Commissioners authority to share with the assessors in the assessment process and in the allocation of tax receipts among the various county projects, to participate in the appointment of the County Treasurer, and to issue warrants and levy fines against delinquent taxpayers and collectors. Other Acts passed during the eighteenth century gave the Commissioners regulatory powers and maintenance functions in regard to county lands, roads, bridges, wharves and landings, courts and the county prison.

In 1780, the Assembly passed an Act that abolished the Board of County Assessors and left its functions with the Commissioners alone, who continued to appoint the assessors and collectors of each of the county's boroughs, townships and districts. Further legislation in 1799 and 1805 formally established the Commissioners' functions of furnishing lists of voters to election officers and aiding the Sheriff in the selection of jurors, as both were based upon lists of taxpayers. During the first half of the nineteenth century, the Commissioners' duties were further increased to include the leasing of polling places, the provision of ballot boxes, and related duties.

=== Consolidation in 1854 ===
The consolidation of the City and County of Philadelphia in 1854 abolished the Board of County Commissioners, with most of its functions transferred to the popularly elected City Commissioners who, although retaining their original title and duties, were thenceforth considered County officers. Because the City Commissioners were considered County officers, they were still regulated by state laws concerning County Commissioners. The City Commissioners should not be confused with the City Council, as these are two separate entities.

Even though the governments of both the City and County were effectively consolidated by the Act of Consolidation, not all offices and agencies, such as the Board of Inspectors of the County Prison (Philadelphia Prison System), Coroner, Recorder of Deeds, and Sheriff, that were controlled by the county prior to the consolidation were transferred to the city, though their oversight and regulation were now managed by the City Commissioners. Other offices and agencies, like that of Offices of City Tax Collector and County Tax Collector were reduced to that of clerk in the new office of Receiver of Taxes. Both Commissioners' (City and County) powers in regard to streets and City property were transferred to the city's Departments of Highways and City Property. From 1854 until 1867, the Commissioners also served as members of the Board of Revision of Taxes. In 1867, the City Assessors were made appointees of that Board.

The powers left to the Commissioners were chiefly accounting ones concerning county institutions, regulatory duties regarding weights and measures (given them by an Act of 1895) and administrative functions in association with elections, which culminated in complete control of their conduct with the formation of the County Board of Elections under their direction in 1937.

=== Philadelphia Home Rule Charter ===
Although not mentioned in the Philadelphia Home Rule Charter, the City Commissioners' Office became part of the City government by way of the 1951 City-County Amendment to the State Constitution. Additionally, the 1963 amendment to the First Class Cities Home Rule Act gave City Council the power to pass legislation with regard to operations of the City Commissioners' Office. The 1965 City-County Consolidation Ordinance of City Council further enabled these enactments.

=== Politics ===
United States presidential election results for Philadelphia County, Pennsylvania
Year	Republican		Democratic		Third party(ies)	
Year	No.	%	No.	%	No.	%
1880	97,220	55.92%	76,330	43.91%	294	0.17%
1884	101,288	58.00%	71,288	40.82%	2,057	1.18%
1888	111,358	54.20%	92,786	45.16%	1,300	0.63%
1892	116,685	57.45%	84,470	41.59%	1,947	0.96%
1896	176,462	72.06%	63,323	25.86%	5,102	2.08%
1900	173,657	73.93%	58,179	24.77%	3,053	1.30%
1904	227,709	80.85%	48,784	17.32%	5,161	1.83%
1908	185,263	69.09%	75,310	28.09%	7,568	2.82%
1912	91,944	36.53%	66,308	26.35%	93,438	37.12%
1916	194,163	66.81%	90,800	31.25%	5,638	1.94%
1920	307,826	73.43%	90,151	21.50%	21,235	5.07%
1924	347,457	77.73%	54,213	12.13%	45,352	10.15%
1928	420,320	59.99%	276,573	39.48%	3,703	0.53%
1932	331,092	54.54%	260,276	42.88%	15,651	2.58%
1936	329,881	36.94%	539,757	60.45%	23,310	2.61%
1940	354,878	39.81%	532,149	59.69%	4,459	0.50%
1944	346,380	40.96%	496,367	58.70%	2,883	0.34%
1948	425,962	48.12%	432,699	48.88%	26,636	3.01%
1952	396,874	41.40%	557,352	58.15%	4,321	0.45%
1956	383,414	42.97%	507,289	56.85%	1,618	0.18%
1960	291,000	31.79%	622,544	68.02%	1,733	0.19%
1964	239,733	26.24%	670,645	73.42%	3,094	0.34%
1968	254,153	29.90%	525,768	61.85%	70,196	8.26%
1972	344,096	43.89%	431,736	55.07%	8,138	1.04%
1976	239,000	32.03%	494,579	66.28%	12,618	1.69%
1980	244,108	33.99%	421,253	58.66%	52,739	7.34%
1984	267,178	34.60%	501,369	64.94%	3,555	0.46%
1988	219,053	32.45%	449,566	66.60%	6,358	0.94%
1992	133,328	20.90%	434,904	68.16%	69,826	10.94%
1996	85,345	16.00%	412,988	77.44%	34,944	6.55%
2000	100,959	17.99%	449,182	80.04%	11,039	1.97%
2004	130,099	19.30%	542,205	80.44%	1,765	0.26%
2008	117,221	16.33%	595,980	83.00%	4,824	0.67%
2012	96,467	13.97%	588,806	85.24%	5,503	0.80%
2016	108,748	15.32%	584,025	82.30%	16,845	2.37%
2020	132,870	17.86%	604,175	81.21%	6,921	0.93%
2024	144,311	19.94%	568,571	78.57%	10,728	1.48%

United States Senate election results for Philadelphia County, Pennsylvania1
Year	Republican		Democratic		Third party(ies)	
Year	No.	%	No.	%	No.	%
1994	91,052	23.13%	293,007	74.44%	9,555	2.43%
2000	121,433	23.06%	398,756	75.72%	6,436	1.22%
2006	67,452	15.89%	357,057	84.11%	0	0.00%
2012	84,461	12.92%	564,886	86.39%	4,503	0.69%
2018	66,653	12.02%	481,467	86.83%	6,387	1.15%
2024	129,098	18.70%	541,567	78.45%	19,651	2.85%

United States Senate election results for Philadelphia County, Pennsylvania3
Year	Republican		Democratic		Third party(ies)	
Year	No.	%	No.	%	No.	%
1992	240,440	39.29%	361,993	59.15%	9,532	1.56%
1998	117,277	38.69%	177,969	58.72%	7,852	2.59%
2004	176,750	28.39%	438,921	70.50%	6,883	1.11%
2010	67,996	15.96%	357,981	84.04%	0	0.00%
2016	116,714	17.03%	560,421	81.79%	8,030	1.17%
2022	78,408	15.71%	412,841	82.71%	7,902	1.58%

Pennsylvania Gubernatorial election results for Philadelphia County
Year	Republican		Democratic		Third party(ies)	
Year	No.	%	No.	%	No.	%
1970	233,261	35.37%	413,742	62.73%	12,567	1.91%
1974	168,532	29.89%	391,272	69.39%	4,107	0.73%
1978	336,771	46.80%	371,646	51.64%	11,224	1.56%
1982	196,998	35.68%	347,129	62.86%	8,059	1.46%
1986	172,718	35.60%	307,233	63.33%	5,161	1.06%
1990	114,078	29.21%	276,427	70.79%	4	0.00%
1994	100,592	24.87%	270,380	66.86%	33,425	8.27%
1998	107,731	35.06%	183,066	59.58%	16,473	5.36%
2002	59,223	14.66%	339,697	84.08%	5,105	1.26%
2006	45,502	10.61%	383,339	89.39%	0	0.00%
2010	72,352	17.11%	350,431	82.89%	0	0.00%
2014	45,268	11.95%	333,539	88.05%	0	0.00%
2018	64,514	11.64%	484,124	87.36%	5,537	1.00%
2022	65,293	13.10%	426,885	85.68%	6,082	1.22%

Philadelphia County is overwhelmingly Democratic, having given the Democratic presidential candidate their largest percentage of any county in Pennsylvania in every election since 1968. The county has voted for the Democrat in every presidential election since 1936. However, between 1860 and 1932, the county always voted Republican. In 1972, it was the only county in the state to vote for George McGovern over Richard Nixon. Since 2016, Democratic margins of victory have shrunk modestly, though it still remains by far the most Democratic leaning county in Pennsylvania. 2024 marked the first time since 1996 in which the Democratic nominee fell under 80% of the vote in the county, with Republican Donald Trump achieving 20% (a feat they have not achieved since 1992).

The shrinking Democratic margins are largely due to increasing Republican gains in Northeast Philadelphia. In 2024, Republican Joe Picozzi flipped a Pennsylvania State Senate seat in Northeast Philadelphia. The shift extended to southern Bucks County, which also flipped Republican for the first time since 1988.

Even Republican Senator Arlen Specter, a Philadelphia resident, did not receive more than one-third of the Philadelphia vote in the 2004 U.S. Senate election, which he won easily. In his first senate election, in 1980, he did win the county, which was the last time any Republican won the county in a statewide election; however, Specter switched to the Democratic Party in 2009 and was defeated in the 2010 Democratic Primary.

==== State House of Representatives ====
District	Representative	Party
10	Amen Brown	Democratic
170	Martina A. White	Republican
172	Sean Dougherty	Democratic
173	Pat Gallagher	Democratic
174	Ed Neilson	Democratic
175	Mary Isaacson	Democratic
177	Joseph C. Hohenstein	Democratic
179	Jason Dawkins	Democratic
180	Jose Giral	Democratic
181	Malcolm Kenyatta	Democratic
182	Ben Waxman	Democratic
184	Elizabeth Fiedler	Democratic
185	Regina Young	Democratic
186	Jordan A. Harris	Democratic
188	Rick Krajewski	Democratic
190	G. Roni Green	Democratic
191	Joanna E. McClinton	Democratic
192	Morgan Cephas	Democratic
194	Tarik Khan	Democratic
195	Keith Harris	Democratic
197	Danilo Burgos	Democratic
198	Darisha K. Parker	Democratic
200	Christopher M. Rabb	Democratic
201	Andre Carroll	Democratic
202	Jared Solomon	Democratic
203	Anthony A. Bellmon	Democratic

==== State Senate ====
District	Senator	Party
1	Nikil Saval	Democratic
2	Christine M. Tartaglione	Democratic
3	Sharif Street	Democratic
4	Art Haywood	Democratic
5	Joe Picozzi	Republican
7	Vincent Hughes	Democratic
8	Anthony H. Williams	Democratic

=== United States House of Representatives ===
District	Representative	Party
2	Brendan Boyle	Democratic
3	Dwight Evans	Democratic
5	Mary Gay Scanlon	Democratic

=== United States Senate ===
Senator	Party
Dave McCormick	Republican
John Fetterman	Democratic

== Communities ==
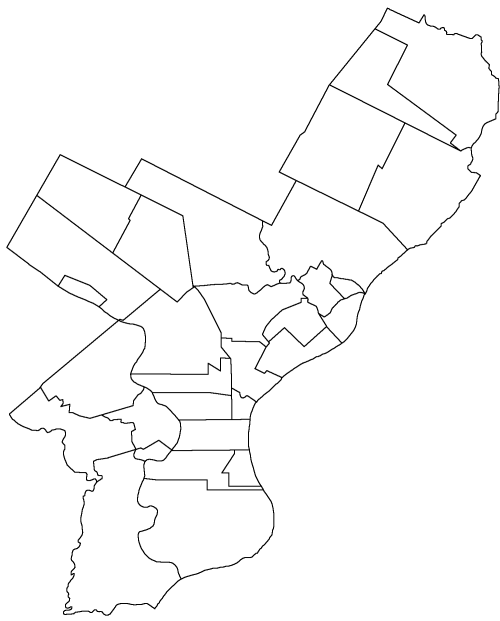
An 1854 map of Philadelphia County

The following districts, townships, and boroughs existed in Philadelphia County before the Act of Consolidation of 1854:

=== City ===
- Philadelphia (County seat)

=== Former townships, boroughs, and districts ===
- Aramingo Borough
- Belmont District
- Blockley Township
- Bristol Township
- Delaware Township
- Germantown Township
- Kensington District
- Lower Dublin Township
- Moreland Township
- Northern Liberties Township
- Oxford Township
- Passyunk Township
- Penn District
- Penn Township
- Richmond District
- Whitehall Borough

== Climate ==
Philadelphia County

Climate chart (precipitation, max. and min. temperature)
J	F	M	A	M	J	J	A	S	O	N	D
107 2 −3	119 7 −2	86 13 1	120 24 9	80 28 13	192 34 19	130 33 21	143 33 21	92 30 17	126 21 10	91 13 5	157 6 −1
- █ Average max. and min. temperatures in °C
- █ Precipitation totals in mm
Imperial conversion
J	F	M	A	M	J	J	A	S	O	N	D
4.2 36 27	4.7 45 28	3.4 55 34	4.7 75 48	3.1 82 55	7.6 93 66	5.1 91 70	5.6 91 70	3.6 86 63	5 70 50	3.6 55 41	6.2 43 30
- █ Average max. and min. temperatures in °F
- █ Precipitation totals in inches

According to the Köppen climate classification system, Philadelphia County has a humid subtropical climate. The average January temperature in Center City is 34.3 °F.

== See also ==
- National Register of Historic Places listings in Philadelphia
