= Passyunk Township, Pennsylvania =

Passyunk Township
- Former Township
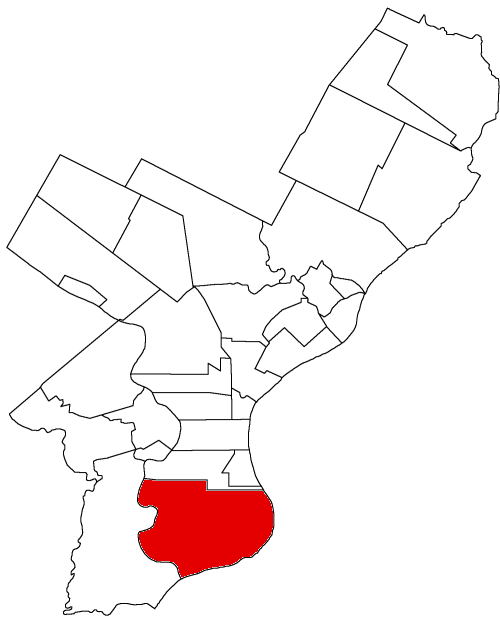
- Map of Philadelphia County, Pennsylvania highlighting Passyunk Township prior to the Act of Consolidation, 1854
- Coordinates: 39°53′53″N 75°12′42″W
- Country: United States
- State: Pennsylvania
- County: Philadelphia
- Time zone: UTC-5 (EST)
  - Summer (DST): UTC-4 (EDT)
- Area codes: 215, 267, and 445

Passyunk Township (Lenape Pahsayunk 'in the valley' from pahsaek 'valley') was a township that was located in Philadelphia County, Pennsylvania, United States.

== History ==
Thomas Holme's 1687 survey map of Philadelphia

This township ceased to exist when it was incorporated into the City of Philadelphia, following the passage of the Act of Consolidation, 1854.

== Additional sources ==
- Johnson, Amandus. The Swedish Settlements on the Delaware Volume I: Their History and Relation to the Indians, Dutch and English, 1638–1664 (1911)

== See also ==
- Fort Beversreede
- New Sweden
- Passyunk Square, Philadelphia
