= Blockley Township, Pennsylvania =

Blockley Township
- Former Township
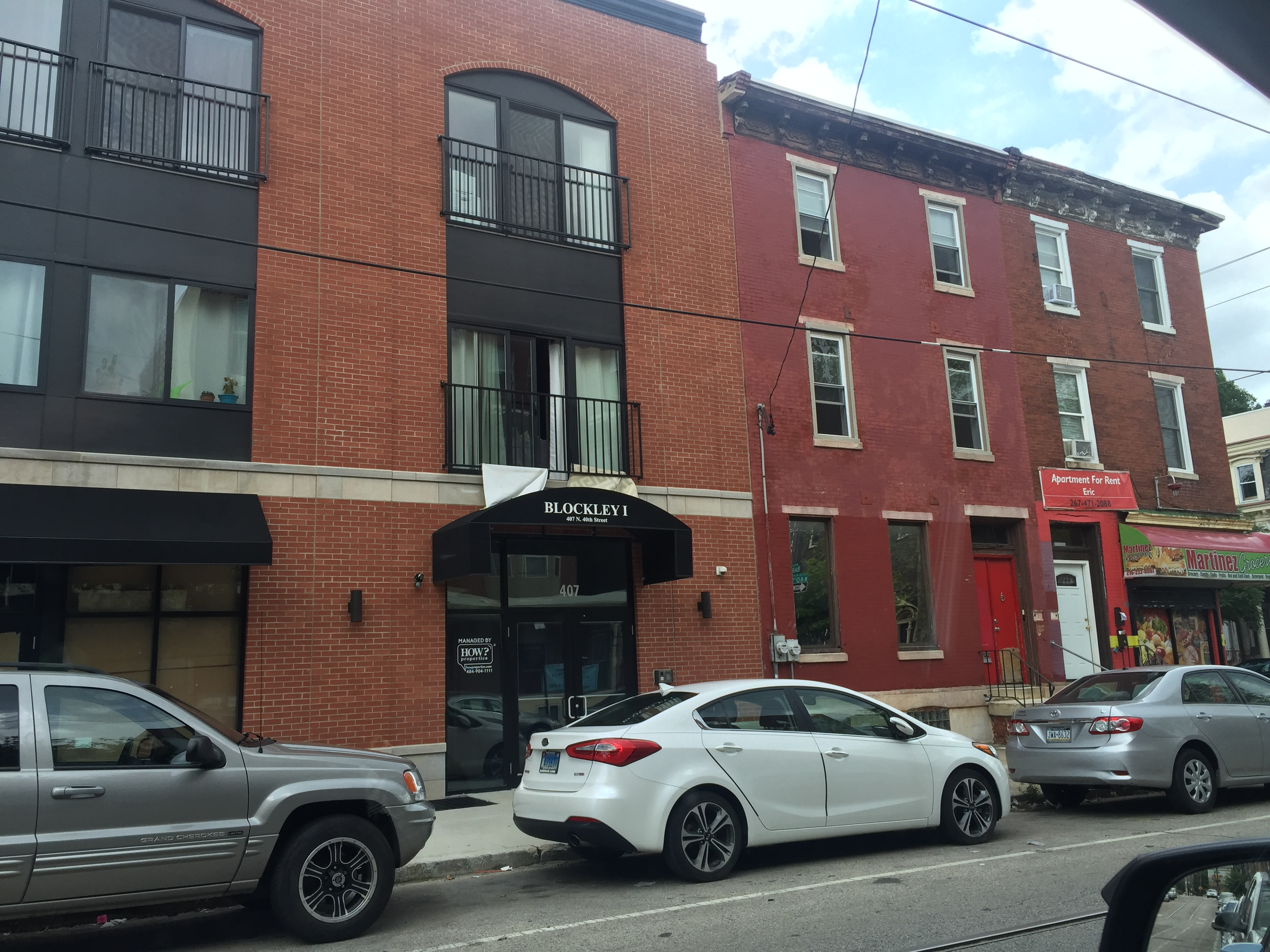
- A reference to the former name of the community

- Location of Blockley Township in Pennsylvania Blockley Township (the United States)
- Coordinates: 39°58′30″N 75°13′50″W
- Country: United States
- State: Pennsylvania
- County: Philadelphia
- Time zone: UTC-5 (EST)
  - Summer (DST): UTC-4 (EDT)
- Area codes: 215, 267, and 445

Blockley Township was a township that was located in Philadelphia County, Pennsylvania, United States. Incorporated in 1704, the township was incorporated into the City of Philadelphia under the 1854 Act of Consolidation.

== History ==
Historical population
Census	Pop.	Note	%±
1850	5,916		—

An irregularly shaped area of 7,580 acres (31 km^{2}), Blockley Township was located on the west side of the Schuylkill River, north of Kingsessing Township; bounded on the east by the Schuylkill; extending south from the county line, opposite to, but a little below, the mouth of the Wissahickon, down to the Nanganesy or Mill Creek, below the Woodlands; then by the same creek up to Chadd’s Ford Turnpike, known in later years as the Baltimore Pike; along the same to Cobb’s Creek; then by the courses of the same to the county line adjoining Lower Merion Township, Montgomery County, and along the same to the Schuylkill River.

Within its boundaries were the villages of Hamilton, Mantua, West Philadelphia, Hestonville and Haddington.

It was traversed by the Darby Road (today's Woodland Avenue) and Chadd’s Ford or Baltimore Pike, the road to West Chester, to Haverford and to Lancaster.

The name is derived from Blockley, a parish in England in Worcestershire (since 1931 in Gloucestershire) from which the township's founder, William Warner, hailed. In Philadelphia, "Blockley" was synonymous with the Blockley Almshouse that opened here in 1832. The township also contained The Woodlands; the former estate of William Hamilton, grandson of Andrew Hamilton, which was converted in 1840 to the Woodlands Cemetery.

The boundaries and area changed on February 17, 1844, when the area encompassing Mantua and Hamilton were incorporated into the Borough of West Philadelphia, dividing the remaining township into two almost unconnected sections.

The township was incorporated into Philadelphia proper by the 1854 Act of Consolidation.

== Resources ==
- Chronology of the Political Subdivisions of the County of Philadelphia, 1683-1854 (Daly, John; Weinberg, Allen (October 1966). Genealogy of Philadelphia County Subdivisions (Second ed.). Philadelphia Dept. of Records.)
- Information courtesy of ushistory.org
- Incorporated District, Boroughs, and Townships in the County of Philadelphia, 1854 By Rudolph J. Walther - excerpted from the book at the ushistory.org website
