= Germantown Township, Pennsylvania =

Germantown Township
- Former Township
- Location of Germantown Township in Pennsylvania Germantown Township (the United States)
- Coordinates: 40°02′20″N 75°11′02″W
- Country: United States
- State: Pennsylvania
- County: Philadelphia
- Time zone: UTC-5 (EST)
  - Summer (DST): UTC-4 (EDT)
- Area codes: 215, 267, and 445

Germantown Township, also known as German Township, was a township that was located in Philadelphia County, Pennsylvania, United States. The municipality ceased to exist and was incorporated into the City of Philadelphia following the passage of the Act of Consolidation, 1854.

== History ==
Germantown Township occupied the area known as the Germantown Tract surveyed by Thomas Holmes in 1683, and depicted on his map of about 1687.

The survey was prepared for Francis Daniel Pastorius, agent for the Frankfurt Land Company, and 13 German families, known as the "Original Thirteen Families", from Krefeld, Germany and nearby areas. The board of directors for the Frankfurt Land Company included Jacobus van der Walle, Johann Jacob Schutz, Johann Wilhelm Ueberfeld, Daniel Behagel, George Strauss, Jan Leureiss, Abram Hasevoet. They had purchased a total of 2,675 acres (11 km^{2}) of land. The Frankfurt Land Company was designed to inspire German settlers to settle their Pennsylvania lands. In the end, however, they sent no settlers, and none of the directors ever came themselves. The settlers from Krefeld had obtained a similar sized parcel, and arrived on the ship Concord, on 6 October 1683, and almost immediately began to clear their land. Additional settlers would begin arriving the following spring.

The Germantown Tract was divided into four settlements, including: Germantown, and the villages of Cresheim, Sommerhausen and Crefelt, laid out in sequence from the south east to the northwest. The villages were named after the hometowns of some of the earliest settlers. The later three villages eventually combined to form the "Upper Ward" of Germantown Township. The Town of Germantown became known simply as the Borough of Germantown.

The greatest length of the Germantown Township was 5½ miles; the greatest breadth, 2 miles (3.2 km); area, 7,040 acres (28 km^{2}). The township was bounded on the northwest and northeast by Springfield Township, Montgomery County on the northeast partly by Bristol Township; on the southeast by Penn Township and Roxborough Township. Within Germantown Township were the settlements known as Germantown, Cresheim (afterwards Mount Airy), Sommerhausen (later called Chestnut Hill) and Crevelt, a rural section north of Chestnut Hill.

== Resources ==
- Chronology of the Political Subdivisions of the County of Philadelphia, 1683–1854
- Information courtesy of ushistory.org
- Incorporated District, Boroughs, and Townships in the County of Philadelphia, 1854 By Rudolph J. Walther - excerpted from the book at the ushistory.org website
