= 1850 United States census =

Seventh US census

- June 1, 1850
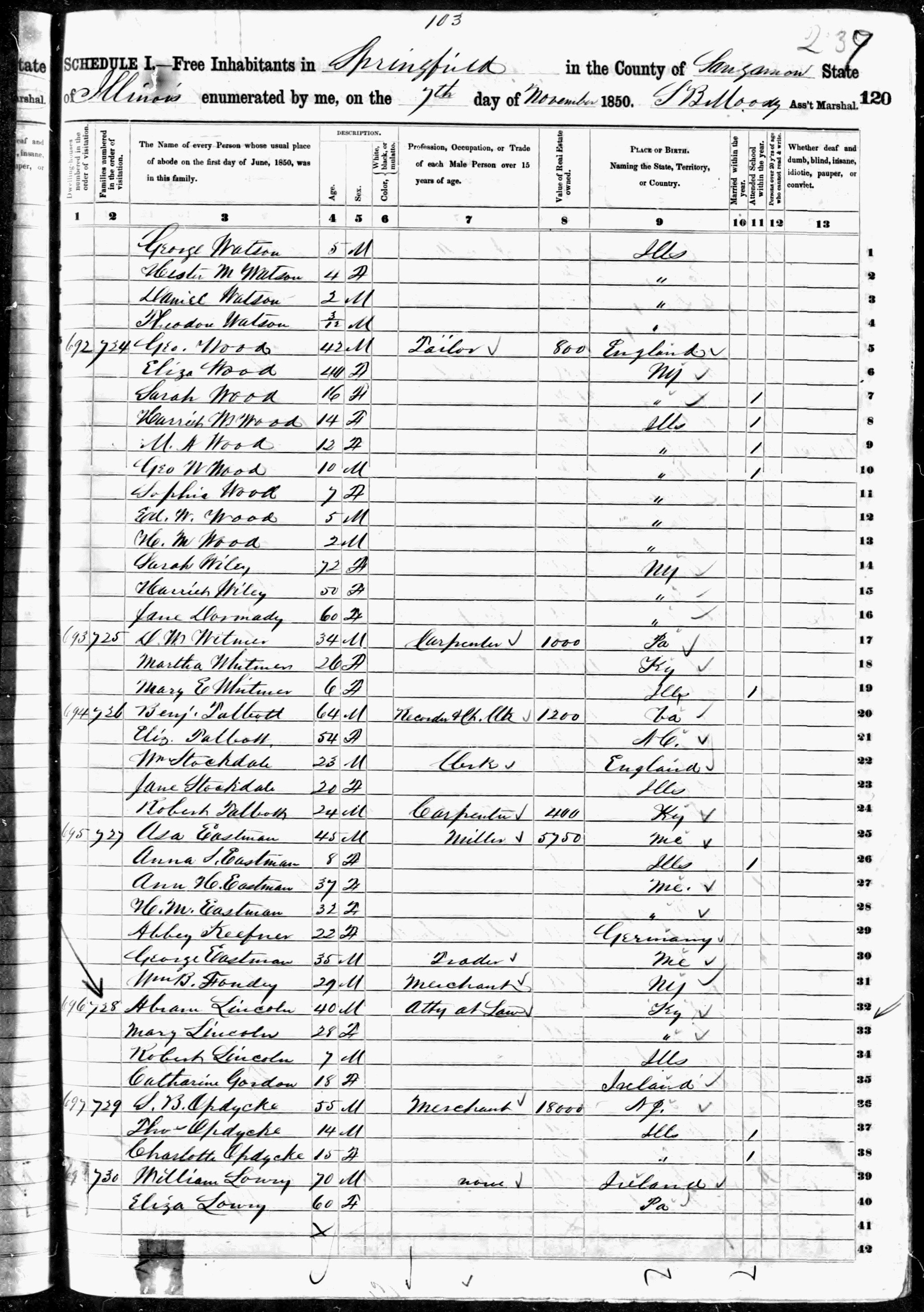
- Filled-out census-taker's form from 1850 U.S. census, including household of Abraham Lincoln

General information
- Country: United States
- Authority: Census Office

Results
- Total population: 23,191,876 (▲35.9%)
- Most populous state: New York; 3,097,394
- Least populous state: Florida; 87,445

The 1850 United States census was the seventh decennial United States Census Conducted by the Census Office, it determined the resident population of the United States to be 23,191,876—an increase of 35.9 percent over the 17,069,453 persons enumerated during the 1840 census. The total population included 3,204,313 enslaved people.

Although the official date of the census date was June 1, 1850, completed census forms indicate that the surveys continued to be made throughout the rest of the year.

This was the first census where there was an attempt to collect information about every member of every household and not only the head of the household. Slaves were included by gender and estimated age on Slave Schedules, listed by the name of the owner. Prior to 1850, census records had recorded only the name of the head of the household and broad statistical accounting of other household members (three children under age five, one woman between the age of 35 and 40, etc.). This was also the first census to ask about place of birth of free residents.

Hinton Rowan Helper made extensive use of the 1850 census results in his influential anti-slavery book The Impending Crisis of the South (1857).

This was the first census in which the US recorded a greater population than the United Kingdom (a year later) which it broke off from 65 years prior.

== Census questions ==
The 1850 census, Schedule 1, Free Inhabitants, collected the following information:

- name
- age
- sex
- color (white, black or mulatto) for each person
- whether deaf and dumb, blind, psychologically ill or idiotic
- value of real estate owned (required of all free persons)
- profession, occupation or trade of each male over 15 years of age
- place (state, territory or country) of birth
- whether married within the year
- whether attended school within the year
- whether unable to read and write (for people over 20)
- whether a pauper or convict

Full documentation for the 1850 population census, including census forms and enumerator instructions, is available from the Integrated Public Use Microdata Series.

== Economy ==
The 1850 United States census collected a great amount of data that gave insight into the state of the U.S. economy in 1850. Some of the data revealed the growth of the economy with regard to agricultural and manufactured production, international trade, federal debt, taxation, transportation, education, and land expansion.

Agricultural Production
This census calculated the total land by state (in square miles), the total production of major goods and livestock per state (in respective units), the total value of each good produced, the total number of plantations per state, and various other statistics. The total agricultural production between in 1850 was calculated at about 1.3 billion dollars.

Manufactured Production
This census included the total manufactured production (in dollars), the total amount of capital invested, the total value of wages paid, the percent of profit (by state and total), the profit by state of major industries (cotton, wool, various iron work, breweries, fishing, salt), and other less significant statistics. Total manufactured production was valued at just over one billion dollars. This is a great increase over the totals estimated in 1820 and 1840. Also, in total, the manufacturing industry recorded an overall profit of 43%.

International Trade
The 1850 census contains the total value of imports and exports by state, statistics and names of the major imports and exports, the total values of shipping by state, and the value of imports and exports with various individual countries. The United States traded most with the United Kingdom. The imports and exports with the United Kingdom were both valued around 145 million dollars.

Federal Debt
This census contains yearly federal debt totals, total federal revenues, and total expenditures from 1790 to 1853. The total debt of the United States on July 1, 1854, was roughly 47.2 million dollars.

Taxation
The census contains some calculation of total annual federal taxes, but it is incomplete. It does however, give state taxation totals.

Transportation and Communication
This census calculates the total cost, size, and quantity of railroads and canals. The funded debt for railroads and canals in 1853 was 130 million. Their gross earnings were more than 38 million dollars. This census also contains estimates for growth in mileage of telegraphic lines in the United States. In 1853 the country contains 89 telegraph lines that stretched 23,261 miles (37,435 km). When published in 1854, the country had an estimated 30,000 miles (48,000 km) of telegraphic lines, a drastic increase.

Education
This census displays the advances of the United States in education and literacy by documenting the number of libraries, the number of schools (public, private, and colleges), state literacy rates, the total newspaper production and consumption, the educational levels of differing races, the total value of tuition costs, the amount of federal land given for education, and other various statistics.

Land Expansion
The 1850 census shows the great amount of territorial expansion that took place in the United States, following the Admission of Texas, the Oregon Treaty, and the Treaty with Mexico following the war in 1848. These three pieces of territory totaled an addition of more than a million square miles to the nation. In 1850, the United States contained 31 states and 4 organized territories (Minnesota, New Mexico, Oregon, Utah).

Significance
The 1850 United States census can be seen as a historical document that gives insight into the state of the nation's economy in 1850. It is much more detailed and provides more information than the 1840 census.

This census was conducted during a very important period of growth and innovation in the United States, the Industrial Revolution. The statistics in this census provide data on the rate of growth that was taking place in 1850, which resulted in the emergence of the United States as an economic world power. Many of the statistics were compared to those of Great Britain and other world powers. This shows where the United States stood economically relative to the rest of the world.

== Data availability ==
Microdata from the 1850 population census are freely available through the Integrated Public Use Microdata Series. Aggregate data for small areas, together with compatible cartographic boundary files, can be downloaded from the National Historical Geographic Information System.

== State rankings ==
Rank	State	Population
01	New York	3,097,394
02	Pennsylvania	2,311,786
03	Ohio	1,980,329
04	Virginia	1,421,661
05	Tennessee	1,002,717
06	Massachusetts	994,514
07	Indiana	988,416
08	Kentucky	982,405
09	Georgia	906,185
10	North Carolina	869,039
11	Illinois	851,470
12	Alabama	771,623
13	Missouri	682,044
14	South Carolina	668,507
15	Mississippi	606,526
16	Maine	583,169
17	Maryland	583,034
18	Louisiana	517,762
19	New Jersey	489,555
20	Michigan	397,654
21	Connecticut	370,792
22	New Hampshire	317,976
23	Vermont	314,120
24	Wisconsin	305,391
X	West Virginia	302,313
25	Texas	212,592
26	Arkansas	209,897
27	Iowa	192,214
28	Rhode Island	147,545
29	California	92,597
30	Delaware	91,532
31	Florida	87,445
X	New Mexico	61,547
X	District of Columbia	51,687
X	Oregon	12,093
X	Utah	11,380
X	Minnesota	6,077
X	Washington	1,201

== City rankings ==
Rank	City	State	Population	Region (2016)
01	New York	New York	515,547	Northeast
02	Baltimore	Maryland	169,054	South
03	Boston	Massachusetts	136,881	Northeast
04	Philadelphia	Pennsylvania	121,376	Northeast
05	New Orleans	Louisiana	116,375	South
06	Cincinnati	Ohio	115,435	Midwest
07	Brooklyn	New York	96,838	Northeast
08	St. Louis	Missouri	77,860	Midwest
09	Spring Garden	Pennsylvania	58,894	Northeast
10	Albany	New York	50,763	Northeast
11	Northern Liberties	Pennsylvania	47,223	Northeast
12	Kensington	Pennsylvania	46,774	Northeast
13	Pittsburgh	Pennsylvania	46,601	Northeast
14	Louisville	Kentucky	43,194	South
15	Charleston	South Carolina	42,985	South
16	Buffalo	New York	42,261	Northeast
17	Providence	Rhode Island	41,513	Northeast
18	Washington	District of Columbia	40,001	South
19	Newark	New Jersey	38,894	Northeast
20	Southwark	Pennsylvania	38,799	Northeast
21	Rochester	New York	36,403	Northeast
22	Lowell	Massachusetts	33,383	Northeast
23	Williamsburgh	New York	30,780	Northeast
24	Chicago	Illinois	29,963	Midwest
25	Troy	New York	28,785	Northeast
26	Richmond	Virginia	27,570	South
27	Moyamensing	Pennsylvania	26,979	Northeast
28	Syracuse	New York	22,271	Northeast
29	Allegheny	Pennsylvania	21,262	Northeast
30	Detroit	Michigan	21,019	Midwest
31	Portland	Maine	20,815	Northeast
32	Mobile	Alabama	20,515	South
33	New Haven	Connecticut	20,345	Northeast
34	Salem	Massachusetts	20,264	Northeast
35	Milwaukee	Wisconsin	20,061	Midwest
36	Roxbury	Massachusetts	18,364	Northeast
37	Columbus	Ohio	17,882	Midwest
38	Utica	New York	17,565	Northeast
39	Charlestown	Massachusetts	17,216	Northeast
40	Worcester	Massachusetts	17,049	Northeast
41	Cleveland	Ohio	17,034	Midwest
42	New Bedford	Massachusetts	16,443	Northeast
43	Reading	Pennsylvania	15,743	Northeast
44	Savannah	Georgia	15,312	South
45	Cambridge	Massachusetts	15,215	Northeast
46	Bangor	Maine	14,432	Northeast
47	Norfolk	Virginia	14,326	South
48	Lynn	Massachusetts	14,257	Northeast
49	Lafayette	Louisiana	14,190	South
50	Petersburg	Virginia	14,010	South
51	Wilmington	Delaware	13,979	South
52	Poughkeepsie	New York	13,944	Northeast
53	Manchester	New Hampshire	13,932	Northeast
54	Hartford	Connecticut	13,555	Northeast
55	Lancaster	Pennsylvania	12,369	Northeast
56	Lockport	New York	12,323	Northeast
57	Oswego	New York	12,205	Northeast
58	Springfield	Massachusetts	11,766	Northeast
59	Fall River	Massachusetts	11,524	Northeast
60	Smithfield	Rhode Island	11,500	Northeast
61	Wheeling	Virginia	11,435	South
62	Newburgh	New York	11,415	Northeast
63	Paterson	New Jersey	11,334	Northeast
64	Dayton	Ohio	10,977	Midwest
65	Taunton	Massachusetts	10,441	Northeast
66	Norwich	Connecticut	10,265	Northeast
67	Kingston	New York	10,232	Northeast
68	Nashville	Tennessee	10,165	South
69	New Brunswick	New Jersey	10,019	Northeast
70	Portsmouth	New Hampshire	9,738	Northeast
71	Newburyport	Massachusetts	9,572	Northeast
72	Newport	Rhode Island	9,563	Northeast
73	Auburn	New York	9,548	Northeast
74	Camden	New Jersey	9,479	Northeast
75	Augusta	Georgia	9,448	South
76	Covington	Kentucky	9,408	South
77	Fishkill	New York	9,240	Northeast
78	New London	Connecticut	8,991	Northeast
79	Penn	Pennsylvania	8,939	Northeast
80	Schenectady	New York	8,921	Northeast
81	Memphis	Tennessee	8,841	South
82	Hempstead	New York	8,811	Northeast
83	Alexandria	Virginia	8,734	South
83	Chenango	New York	8,734	Northeast
85	Montgomery	Alabama	8,728	South
86	Portsmouth	Virginia	8,626	South
87	Brookhaven	New York	8,595	Northeast
88	Concord	New Hampshire	8,576	Northeast
89	Seneca	New York	8,505	Northeast
90	Nantucket	Massachusetts	8,452	Northeast
91	Georgetown	District of Columbia	8,366	South
92	Chicopee	Massachusetts	8,291	Northeast
93	Lawrence	Massachusetts	8,282	Northeast
94	Augusta	Maine	8,225	Northeast
95	Dover	New Hampshire	8,196	Northeast
96	New Albany	Indiana	8,181	Midwest
97	Elmira	New York	8,166	Northeast
98	Lexington	Kentucky	8,159	South
99	Danvers	Massachusetts	8,109	Northeast
100	Indianapolis	Indiana	8,091	Midwest

== Controversy ==
The Utah Territorial census was taken in 1851. Secretary Broughton Harris refused to certify the census of Utah Territory. Harris complained that Brigham Young had conducted the census without him, claimed several irregularities, and consequently withheld funds reserved for the census. The controversy contributed to Harris' decision to join other Runaway Officials of 1851 and abandon his post in Utah Territory. Relationships with the federal government continued to sour and eventually resulted in the Utah War.

Local government officials feared having an enslaved population might impede the territory's quest for statehood, since certain members of Congress were concerned about expansion of slavery into the western territories. The 1850 census slave schedule for Utah Territory reported only 26 slaves, with a note that all of them were heading to California, and did not include any enslaved people remaining in the territory. John David Smith estimates that there were 100 blacks in Utah by 1850, with two-thirds of them enslaved.

== See also ==
- Joseph C. G. Kennedy – Supervisor of the 1850 and 1860 census
