= Whitehall Borough, Pennsylvania =

Whitehall Borough
- Former Borough
- Location of Whitehall in Pennsylvania Whitehall Borough (the United States)
- Coordinates: 39°56′53″N 75°11′11″W
- Country: United States
- State: Pennsylvania
- County: Philadelphia
- Time zone: UTC-5 (EST)
  - Summer (DST): UTC-4 (EDT)
- Area codes: 215, 267, and 445

Whitehall Borough was a borough that was located in Philadelphia County, Pennsylvania, United States. The borough ceased to exist when it was incorporated into the City of Philadelphia on the passage of the Act of Consolidation, 1854.

== History ==
The area takes its name from White Hall, a grand mansion built there by Jesse Waln.

When it was incorporated into a borough on April 9, 1849, it covered what today is called East Frankford, between the Little Tacony (or Tackawanna) and Frankford Creeks, including Frankford and Bridesburg Stations on the former Pennsylvania Railroad, Whitehall Commons, and the Frankford Arsenal. It lay northwest of Bridesburg Borough, and southeast of Frankford Borough. It was situated in the old township of Tacony and the later Northern Liberties Township.

In 1853, the part of Whitehall that lay between Torresdale Avenue and Frankford Creek and below what is now Whitehall Commons was ceded to the borough of Frankford, leaving it with an area of only 0.471 square mile.

== Resources ==
- Chronology of the Political Subdivisions of the County of Philadelphia, 1683-1854 (Daly, John; Weinberg, Allen (October 1966). Genealogy of Philadelphia County Subdivisions (Second ed.). Philadelphia Dept. of Records.)
- Incorporated Districts, Boroughs, and Townships in the County of Philadelphia, 1854 By Rudolph J. Walther, excerpted at ushistory.org
