= Moyamensing, Philadelphia =

Area in Philadelphia, US

Moyamensing
- Former Township
- Location of Moyamensing Township, Pennsylvania Moyamensing (the United States)
- Coordinates: 39°56′02″N 75°08′54″W
- Country: United States
- State: Pennsylvania
- County: Philadelphia
- Time zone: UTC-5 (EST)
  - Summer (DST): UTC-4 (EDT)
- Area codes: 215, 267, and 445

Thomas Holme's Survey Map (1687)

Moyamensing is an area of Philadelphia established as a Moyamensing Township during British colonial rule on the fast land of the Neck, lying between Passyunk and Wicaco. It was incorporated into Philadelphia County, Pennsylvania, United States and today encompasses several neighborhoods along the Moyamensing Avenue corridor in the South Philadelphia section of Philadelphia.

== History ==
Historical population
Census	Pop.	Note	%±
1830	6,822		—
1840	14,573		113.6%
1850	26,979		85.1%

The area was originally Lenape Nation land, and while one popular explanation given for the name Moyamensing is "place of pigeon droppings," linguist Raymond Whritenour links it to the Southern Unami word mwimënshink, meaning “place of wild black cherry trees.”

A tract identified by the stream Moyamensink Kill was granted in 1664 by the Dutch West India Company Lieutenant Alexander d'Hinoyossa, vice-director of New Amstel to Marten Roseman (aka Marten Cleinsmit), William Stille and Lawrence Andries, and a 1680 survey identified the nearby swampy area as Moyamensic Marsh. In 1684, when the land was turned over from the Dutch to the English, the title was given by William Penn to William Stille, Lassey Andrews, Andrew Bankson and John Matson.

Moyamensing Township included this ground and Wicaco, except such parts of the latter as were included in Southwark. Its northern boundary was South Street and below the existing parts of Southwark; its eastern boundary was the Delaware River, and its western boundary was Schuylkill Sixth (Seventeenth Street).

In 1816, the greatest length of Moyamensing was estimated to be three miles; the greatest breadth, two miles; area, 2,560 acres (10 km^{2}). By act of March 24, 1812, the inhabitants of Moyamensing were incorporated by the style of "the commissioners and inhabitants of the township of Moyamensing" and they even had their own police force. By act of April 4, 1831, the township was divided into East and West Moyamensing. The township was one of the earliest created after the settlement of Pennsylvania, and became part of Philadelphia in 1854.

The Moyamensing Prison was built between 1822 and 1835 at Reed and 10th Streets. A portion of it also housed a debtors' prison. The structure was demolished in 1967.

== Other sources ==
- Walther, Rudolph J. Happenings in Ye Olde Philadelphia 1680-1900 (Philadelphia, PA: Walther Printing House, 1925)
- Craig, Peter Stebbins Olof Persson Stille and his Family (Philadelphia, PA: Swedish Colonial News. Volume 1, Number 16. Fall 1997)
