= Penn District, Pennsylvania =

Penn District
- Former Township
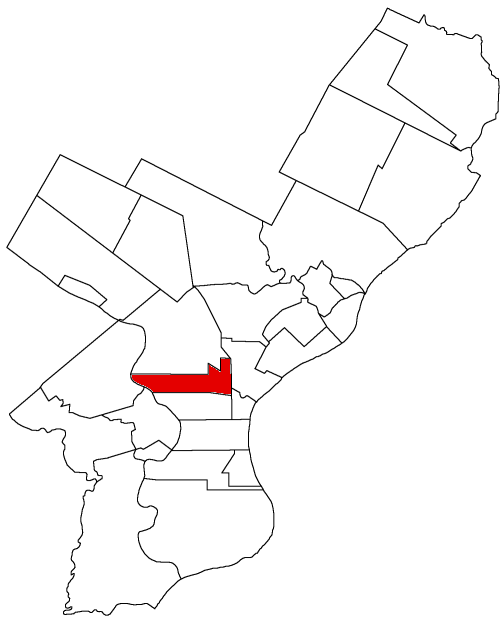
- Map of Philadelphia County, Pennsylvania highlighting Penn District prior to the Act of Consolidation, 1854
- Coordinates: 39°57′00″N 75°09′15″W
- Country: United States
- State: Pennsylvania
- County: Philadelphia
- Time zone: UTC-5 (EST)
  - Summer (DST): UTC-4 (EDT)
- Area codes: 215, 267, and 445

Penn District was a district located in Philadelphia County, Pennsylvania, United States. The district ceased to exist and was incorporated into the City of Philadelphia following the passage of the Act of Consolidation, 1854.

== History ==
Penn District was a portion of the Penn Township which was north of the northern boundary line of Spring Garden between Delaware, Sixth Street and the Schuylkill River and between a line parallel with Hickory Lane (formerly Coates Street, now Fairmont Avenue), west of Sixth Street as far as Broad Street, and then due west to the Schuylkill, and along the same to a line parallel with, and at a distance of one hundred feet north of Susquehanna Avenue, and thence to the middle of the Sixth Street.

It was created a district by Act of the assembly on February 26, 1844, as "the Commissioners and Inhabitants of the district of Penn".

== Resources ==
- Chronology of the Political Subdivisions of the County of Philadelphia, 1683-1854 (Daly, John; Weinberg, Allen (October 1966). Genealogy of Philadelphia County Subdivisions (Second ed.). Philadelphia Dept. of Records.)
- Information courtesy of ushistory.org
- Incorporated District, Boroughs, and Townships in the County of Philadelphia, 1854 By Rudolph J. Walther - excerpted from the book at the ushistory.org website
