= West Philadelphia Borough, Pennsylvania =

West Philadelphia Borough
- Former Borough
- Location of Bridesburg in Pennsylvania West Philadelphia Borough (the United States)
- Coordinates: 39°56′53″N 75°11′11″W
- Country: United States
- State: Pennsylvania
- County: Philadelphia
- Time zone: UTC-5 (EST)
  - Summer (DST): UTC-4 (EDT)
- ZIP code: 19127
- Area codes: 215, 267, and 445

West Philadelphia Borough, also known as West Philadelphia District, was a borough that was located west of the Schuylkill River in Blockley Township, Philadelphia County, Pennsylvania, United States. The borough ceased to exist and was incorporated into the City of Philadelphia following the passage of the Act of Consolidation, 1854.

== History ==
The borough was created on February 17, 1844, incorporating the villages of Hamilton and Mantua and their surrounding area. The borough became a district on April 3, 1853, and along with the new title came a larger area.

== Resources ==
- Chronology of the Political Subdivisions of the County of Philadelphia, 1683-1854 (Daly, John; Weinberg, Allen (October 1966). Genealogy of Philadelphia County Subdivisions (Second ed.). Philadelphia Dept. of Records.)
- Information courtesy of ushistory.org
- Incorporated District, Boroughs, and Townships in the County of Philadelphia, 1854 By Rudolph J. Walther - excerpted from the book at the ushistory.org website
