= Cohocksink Creek =

Coordinates: 39.999832°N 75.170452°W

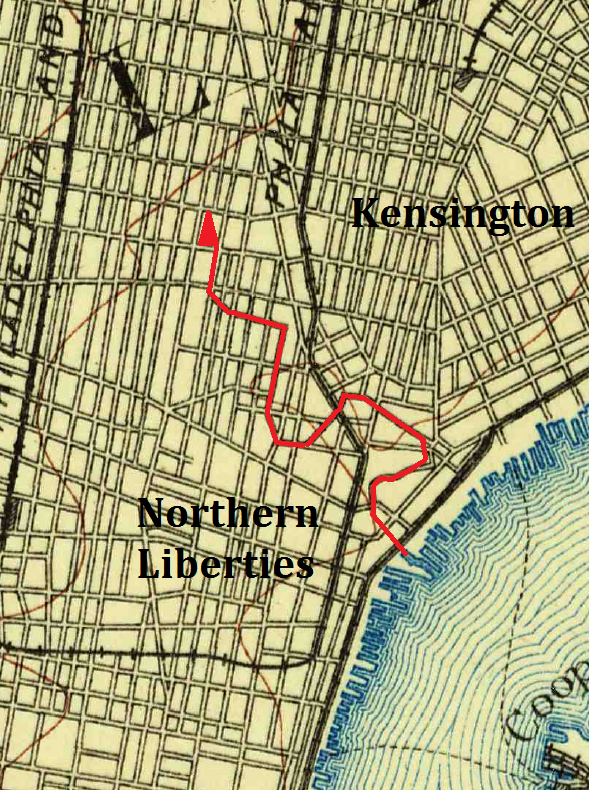
The course of the Cohocksink Creek

The Cohocksink Creek was formerly a stream running between what are now the Philadelphia neighborhoods of Northern Liberties and Kensington. It was a tributary of the Delaware River. Its name, spelled various ways, is said to come from a Lenape word for "pine lands". Alternate names included Stacey's Creek. The creek arose at the confluence of two smaller streams in a pond around the present-day intersection of Sixth and Thompson streets. For centuries, Cohocksink Creek has often been confused with Cohoquinoque Creek, a culverted stream about a mile to the south.

== Early settlement and industry ==
The Cohocksink and its marshlands divided the District of Kensington from the city of Philadelphia and its Northern Liberties. The first settlers were Swedish, predating the founding of the colony of Pennsylvania. As early as 1700, area mills and tanneries took advantage of the stream for water power, including one mill built between Fifth and Sixth streets at the direction of William Penn, Pennsylvania's founder. The neighborhoods on either side of the Cohocksink were home to much Philadelphia's early industrial development. During the American Revolution, the Cohocksink was line of defense for the British as they occupied Philadelphia. Planting artillery on the south side, the British dammed the stream to create a broad marshland, forming a barrier against attacks from the north.

== Conversion to sewer ==
By the mid-eighteenth century, area factories became less dependent on water for the source of their power. In order to promote drainage in the developing neighborhoods, and to discourage the miasma said to originate from the creek, the Cohocksink was converted to a storm sewer in the 1850s, around the time Northern Liberties and Kensington were consolidated into the city of Philadelphia. Industry had taken its toll on the Cohocksink; when it was finally culverted, the City Board of Health issued a statement describing the project as "one of the most valuable sanitary improvements ever to be undertaken by the corporate authorities. ... For years this natural tributary of the Delaware ... has been a prolific source of miasma. The entire length of its serpentine bed had become the receptacle of vile refuse and dead animals, while its sides were lined with privies, emptying their contents upon its filthy surface; added to these, the offal from cow-stables, dye houses, slaughterhouses, kitchens, and the impurities from various trades and factories, together with street-sewage ... thus predisposing to and causing the spread of ... disease throughout the entire vicinity."

== Modern times ==
In the first few decades after being buried, the creek often burst out of its tunnels during rainstorms. Since that time, it has been more reliably contained, and many residents are unaware that a former creek runs beneath their streets. The Cohocksink now runs under the streets shown on the map at right.

== See also ==
- List of rivers of Pennsylvania
