= Penn Township, Philadelphia County, Pennsylvania =

Penn Township
- Former Township
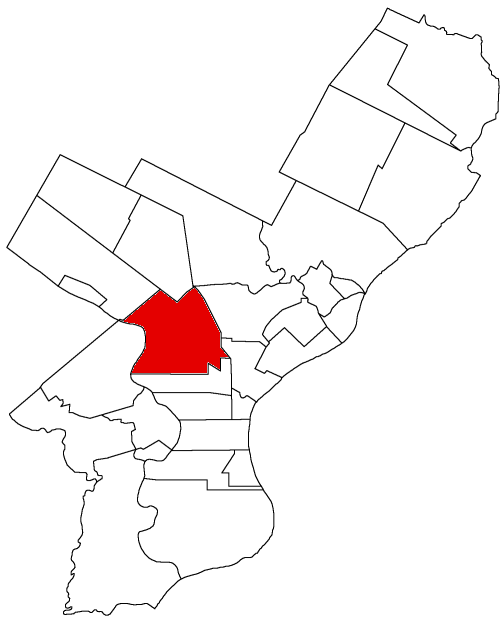
- Map of Philadelphia County, Pennsylvania highlighting Penn Township before the Act of Consolidation, 1854
- Coordinates: 40°01′19″N 75°10′30″W
- Country: United States
- State: Pennsylvania
- County: Philadelphia
- Time zone: UTC-5 (EST)
  - Summer (DST): UTC-4 (EDT)
- Area codes: 215, 267, and 445

Penn Township was a township that was located in Philadelphia County, Pennsylvania. The township ceased to exist and was incorporated into the City of Philadelphia following the passage of the Act of Consolidation, 1854.

== History ==
Penn Township was formed from the western portion of the Northern Liberties Township by order of the Court of Quarter Sessions in the year 1807. It was north of Vine Street, bounded on the east by 6th Street to the intersection of the road to Germantown. From there, it proceeds north by west to the foot of Logan's Hill, southwest to the township line road along the same to a point a short distance above Manheim Lane, then over in a southwest direction to the Schuylkill River, and down the same to Vine Street. Its greatest length was four miles; its greatest width was three miles; and it comprised 7,680 acres. (31 km^{2}).

The districts of Spring Garden and Penn were created out of this township, and it included portions of Rising Sun and Nicetown and Fort St. Davids, after which it is called Falls Village. It was traversed in a northwestern direction by the Ridge Avenue, from 9th and Vine streets, and northeastwardly from the Schuylkill, between Fairmount and Lemon Hill, by Farmers’ Lane, which ran into the Germantown Road, and by Nicetown Lane, from the Ridge Road below the Falls, and over to Nicetown, Germantown, and beyond.

== Resources ==
- Chronology of the Political Subdivisions of the County of Philadelphia, 1683-1854 (Daly, John; Weinberg, Allen (October 1966). Genealogy of Philadelphia County Subdivisions (Second ed.). Philadelphia Dept. of Records.)
- Information courtesy of ushistory.org
- Incorporated District, Boroughs, and Townships in the County of Philadelphia, 1854 By Rudolph J. Walther - excerpted from the book at the ushistory.org website
