= Spring Garden, Philadelphia =

Historic neighborhood in Pennsylvania, United States

- Spring Garden District
- U.S. National Register of Historic Places
- U.S. Historic district
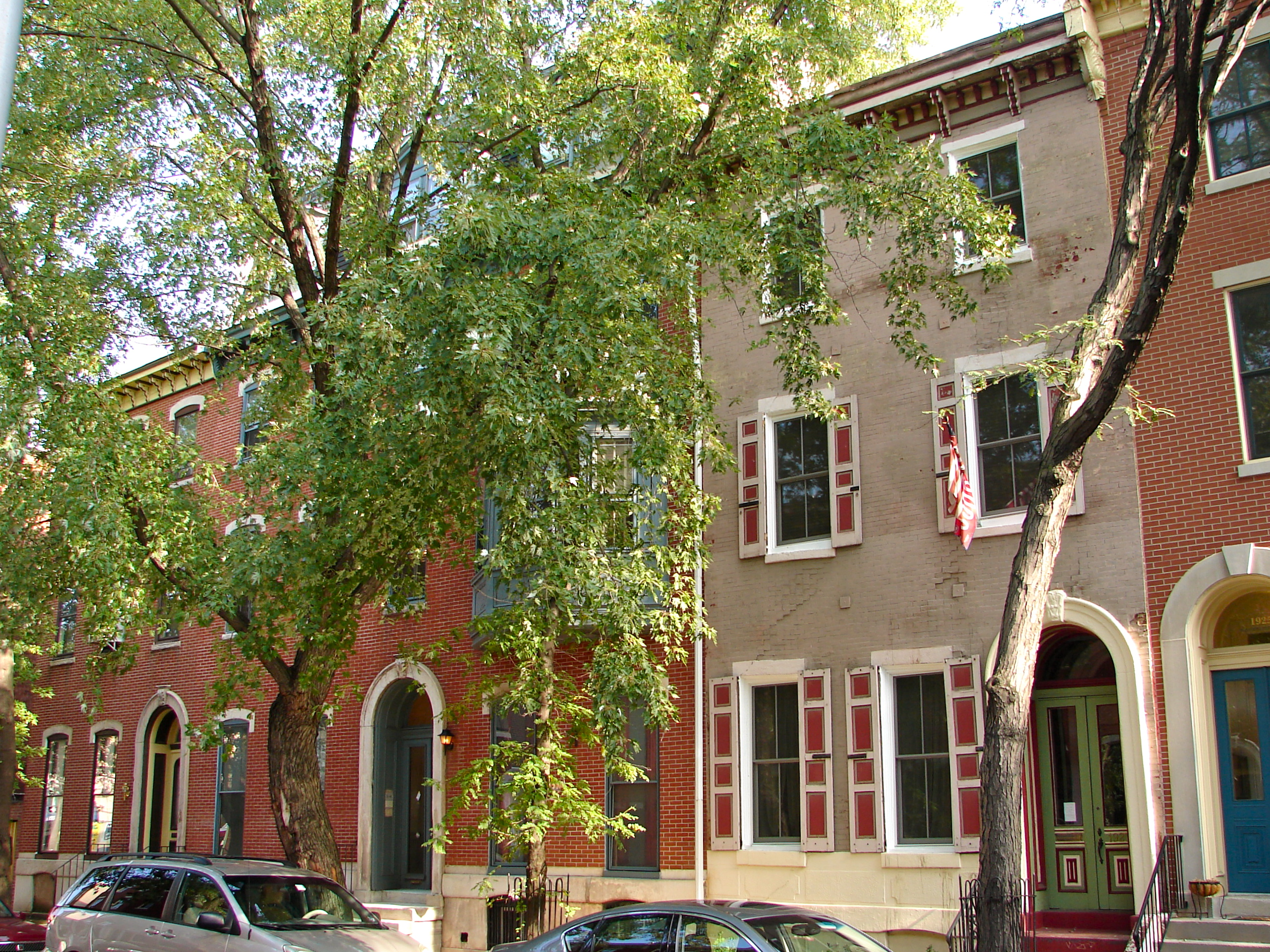
- The Spring Garden section of Philadelphia in August 2010

- Location within Philadelphia Location within Pennsylvania Location within the United States
- Location: Roughly centered on Spring Garden Street and bounded by Fairmount Avenue, Broad Street, the Schuylkill River, and Vine Street, Philadelphia, Pennsylvania
- Coordinates: 39°57′58″N 75°10′11″W
- Architect: Multiple
- Architectural style: Late 19th And 20th century Revivalism, Late Victorian
- NRHP reference No.: 78002455
- Added to NRHP: December 21, 1978

Spring Garden is a neighborhood in North Philadelphia, Pennsylvania, bordering Center City on the north. Spring Garden is a neighborhood that combines diverse residential neighborhoods and significant cultural attractions.

The residential areas on the north side of the neighborhood, located north of Spring Garden Street. The neighborhood is composed mostly of brick and brownstone three-story townhouses built during the mid-to-late 19th century. The houses include townhouses in the Italianate style, Second Empire, Queen Anne, and Venetian Gothic. Many streets, including Green Street and Spring Garden Street, include "terraced" set ups, which include a small gardened plot, often raised, in front of the house. The residential areas to the south are dominated by taller, multi-family buildings built during the 20th century.

The museum area, located south of Spring Garden Street, includes the Rodin Museum, the Free Library of Philadelphia, and the Barnes Foundation. Before consolidation of Philadelphia, Spring Garden was a district of Philadelphia County.

== Boundaries ==
Finkel defines Spring Garden as "North of Benjamin Franklin Parkway to Fairmount Avenue, Broad Street to Schuylkill River." The Philadelphia Information Locator Service list augmented from the Finkel 1995 list, repeats Finkel's definition of the neighborhood's boundaries. One qualification that should be added is that this definition would have Spring Garden as extending deep into Center City, nearly all the way to City Hall. The other boundary that most would agree Finkel omitted is Vine Street.

The Spring Garden Civic Association limits its purview to only the northern half of the above definition, as "between Spring Garden Street and Fairmount Avenue and between Broad Street and Pennsylvania Avenue/Fairmount Park." The sub-neighborhood of Baldwin Park occupies the area between Spring Garden Street and Vine Street and between Broad Street and the Schuylkill River. The neighborhood is named after the centrally located Matthias Baldwin Park.

The neighborhood's main arterial road is Spring Garden Street, running east to west.

== Demographics ==
Historical population
Year	Pop.	±%
1820	3,498	—
1830	11,140	+218.5%
1840	27,849	+150.0%
1850	58,894	+111.5%

Spring Garden is within the 19130 ZIP Code, which also includes Fairmount and Francisville. The 2000 census reported that the population within the 19130 ZIP code is 22,252. The racial composition of Spring Garden was 60% white, 30% African American, 3% Asian, and 7% Hispanic. Ten years later, the population of the 19130 ZIP code had increased by 10% to 24,870, an increase in population of 2,618, with a racial composition of 68.1% white, 21.4% black, and 5.6% Asian.

Before the neighborhood was incorporated into the city of Philadelphia in 1854, the city of Spring Garden peaked at ninth on the list of the largest cities in the United States during the 1850 Census.

== History ==
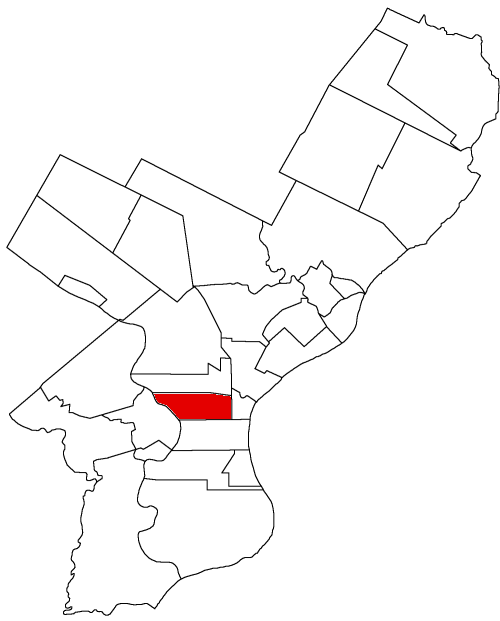
Map of Philadelphia County highlighting Spring Garden District prior to the Act of Consolidation, 1854

Spring Garden appears in Varie's map of 1796 as a small settlement between Vine Street and Buttonwood Lane and a point on a line with Seventh Street, and extending as far west as Ridge Road. There was a street, now known as Franklin Street which ran north from Vine Street across Callowhill, and stopped opposite a house half-way between Callowhill, and Buttonwood Lane. The Street now known as Eighth Street (then called Garden Street) ran through the centre of the district, and the street now called Darien, formally Garden Street, then called Spring Street, ran from Vine to Buttonwood.

The neighborhood was originally part of Northern Liberties, a township to the north of the city, which at that time was distinct from the other townships and municipalities within the County of Philadelphia. It was originally part of a manor (named Spingettsbury Farm) established by William Penn. During the late 1700s, the manor was split into two estates---"Bush Hill" (located to the east of 19th Street) and "The Hills" (located to the west of 19th Street). In the early 1800s, the estates were subdivided, and from 1850 to 1876, housing was developed in alignment with the city grid that had originally been established by William Penn.

The neighborhood name is quite old, going back many decades before Philadelphia's Act of Consolidation, when the area was part of the Spring Garden District of Philadelphia County, not yet part of the city. Finkel gives 1808 as the year it first appears in the written sources that he and his contributors consulted. The Philadelphia Information Locator Service list (augmented from the Finkel 1995 list), while repeating Finkel's definition of the neighborhood's boundaries, gives 1813 as the earliest year of use.

The district was incorporated March 22, 1813, as "the Commissioners and Inhabitants of the district of Spring Garden." The original boundaries were Vine Street on the south; the middle of Hickory Lane (afterwards Coates Street, now Fairmount Avenue) on the north; Broad Street on; the west, and the middle of Sixth Street on; the east.

On March 21, 1827, the district was enlarged by adding; that part of Penn Township beginning at the middle of Sixth Street to a point 210 feet north of the north side of Poplar Lane; thence northwest, parallel to the lane, at a distance of 200 feet from the latter, to the middle of Broad Street; thence parallel with Vine Street to the Schuylkill River.

The meaning of this was, that whilst the upper boundary of the district took a course from Sixth Street west by north to Broad Street, the line beyond the latter ran due east and west to the Schuylkill. It extended by the course of that river to Vine Street, and along the latter to Broad, where it met the old district line. By this addition the size of Spring Garden was more than doubled. At the time of consolidation the area of the district was estimated to be 1100 acres (4.5 km^{2}).

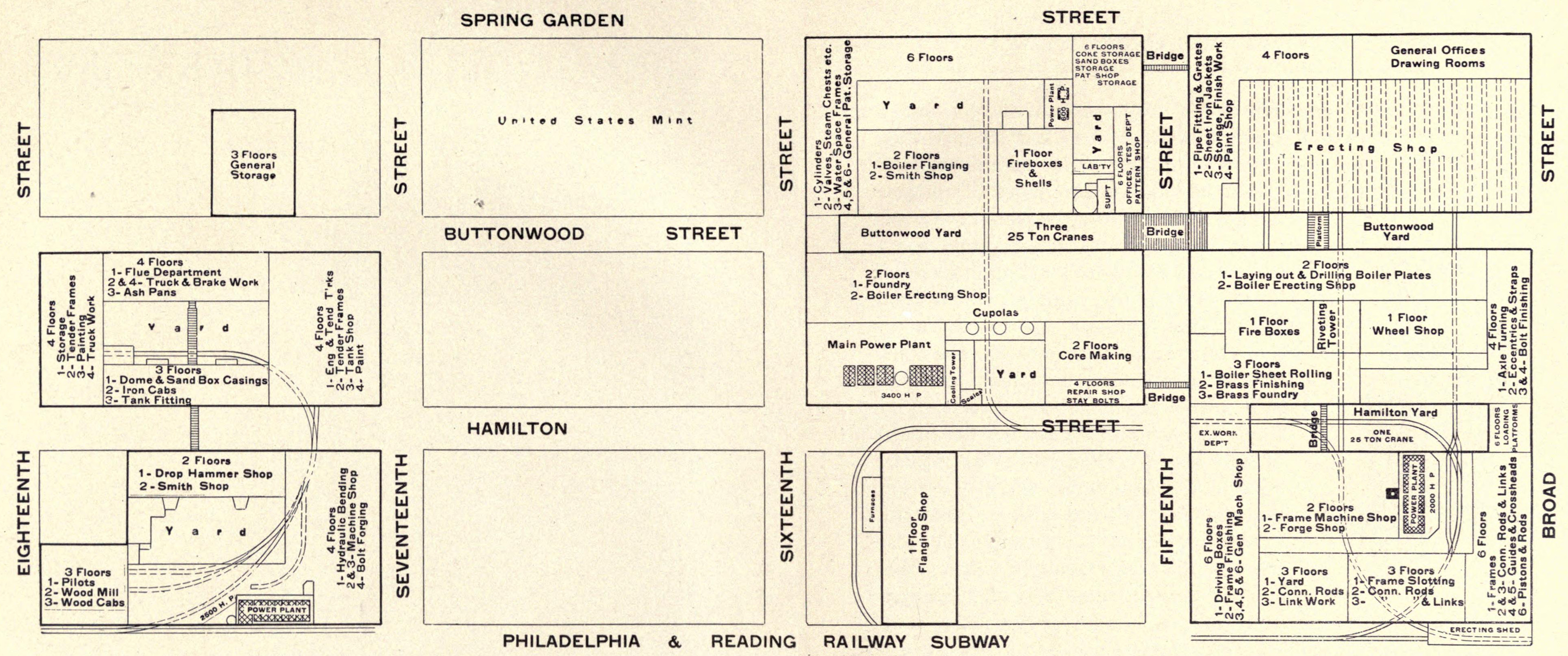
1903 plan of Baldwin Locomotive Works.

The former diagonal street York Avenue, a short section of which survives in Center City, formerly ran from Spring Garden to Fifth Street near Market Street and during the mid 19th century served as a major commuter route for residents of the Spring Garden District who worked in what was then the central business district of Philadelphia.

At the time of its consolidation in 1854, it was one of the ten largest cities in the United States.

The neighborhood was once home to significant heavy industry. Many blocks of the neighborhood were once covered by the Baldwin Locomotive Works. Various Bement-related machine tool firms (William Bement & Son; Bement, Miles & Co; and then Niles-Bement-Pond) occupied the site where the Barnes Foundation museum now stands.

== Infrastructure and government ==
=== City government ===
The Spring Garden neighborhood is in the 15th Ward and the 8th Ward. The 8th Ward leaders in 2011 are Stephanie Singer (D) and Alber Doering (R); the 15th Ward leaders are William Greenlee (D) and Jason Brehouse (R). Generally, the northern part of Spring Garden (Spring Garden Street and north) is in the 15th Ward; the southern part is in the 8th Ward.

Spring Garden is within the 5th City Council District. As of 2013, the 5th district is served by Councilman Darrell Clarke, who is the council's president.

=== State government ===
The Spring Garden neighborhood is in the 182d State House District and the 195th State House District. Generally, the northern part of Spring Garden (Spring Garden Street and north; roughly co-terminous with the portions of Spring Garden in the 15th Ward) is in the 195th State House District. In 2011, the representative from the 195th house district was Michelle F. Brownlee. Generally, the southern part of Spring Garden (the portion in the 8th Ward) is in the 182d State House District. In 2011, the representative from the 182d house district is Babette Josephs.

The Spring Garden neighborhood is in the 1st State Senate District. Since 2020, the State Senator is Nikil Saval.

=== Community association ===
Spring Garden is represented by the Spring Garden Civic Association. The Civic Association performs neighborhood maintenance services, such as occasional street sweeping and tree planting. Further, much of the neighborhood is included in The Spring Garden Historic District, intended to preserve the historic architecture of the neighborhood.

=== Parks ===
The neighborhood includes the Roberto Clemente Playground, which was renovated in 2011 and includes a "sprayground." The neighborhood also includes "The Spring Gardens" community garden which covers an entire city block. The block was cleared in 1996 and was turned into a community garden composed of over 180 garden plots that are cared for by neighborhood families.

== Transportation ==
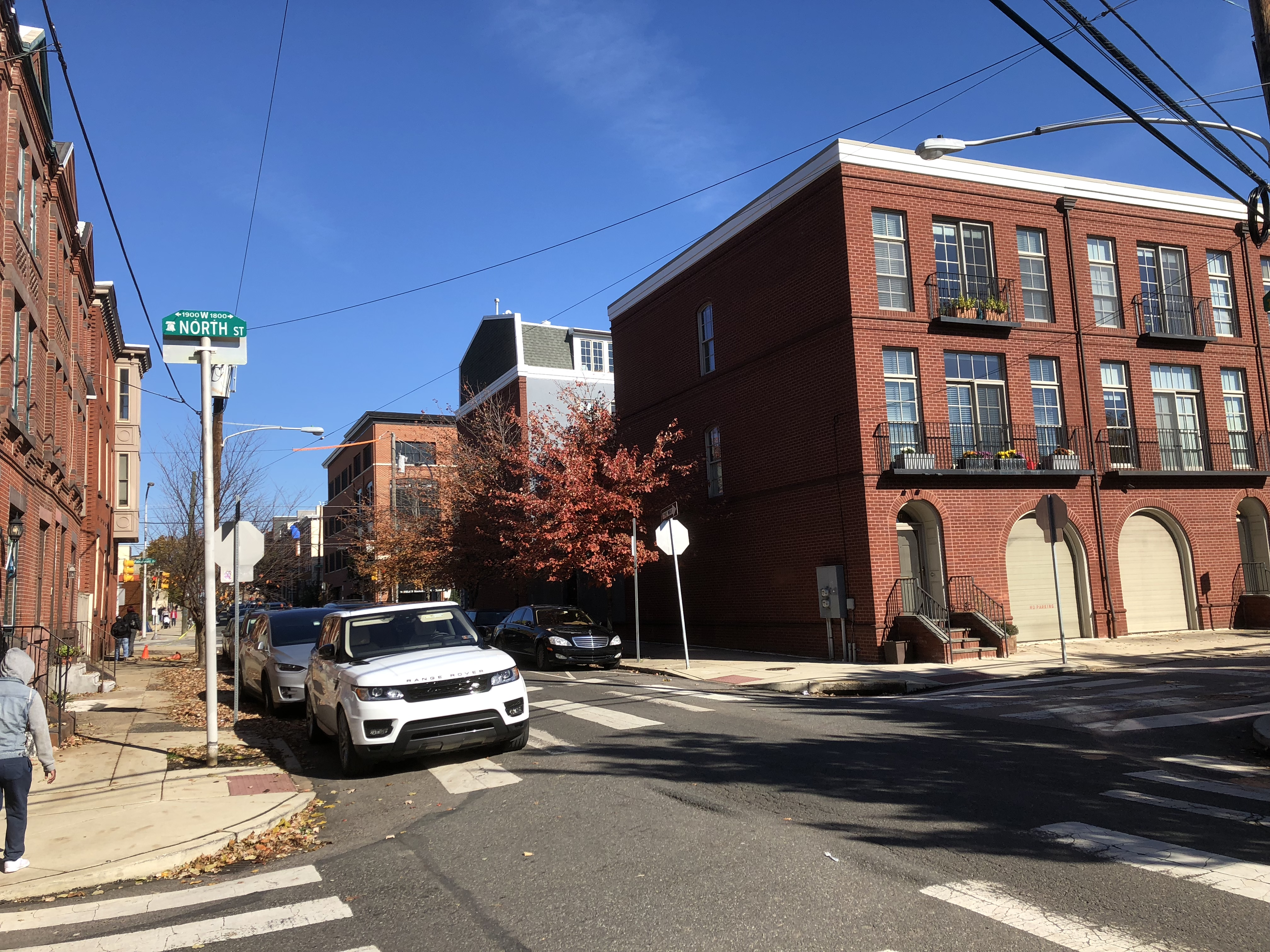
19th and North Streets just south of Fairmount Avenue in Spring Garden

=== Automobile ===
As mentioned above, the main arterial road through Spring Garden is Spring Garden Street, which runs east and west. The neighborhood is bounded on the east by Broad Street, which runs north and south. The neighborhood is also bounded by Vine Street on the south, which contains an entrance to Interstate 676. On the west, the neighborhood is bounded by the Benjamin Franklin Parkway and Pennsylvania Avenue.

=== Public transportation ===
Spring Garden is served by several public transportation routes of SEPTA, the Southeastern Pennsylvania Transportation Authority.

Despite the neighborhood's importance to American railway history, most of its rail infrastructure is gone. The Philadelphia and Reading right-of-way, cut down below street level, is abandoned to woods in one portion and serves as parking in another.

Several bus routes and a subway route connect the neighborhood to Center City and other city neighborhoods.

==== Broad Street subway ====
On the east side of the neighborhood, the subway connects the neighborhood to North Philadelphia (for example, Temple University), City Hall, Walnut Street, and the Sports Complex. The Spring Garden station, refurbished in 2011, is located at Broad Street and Spring Garden Street.

==== Bus route 33 ====
The 33 bus route runs south through the neighborhood on 19th Street. It runs along Market eastward to Penn's Landing. The 33 returns, running west along John F. Kennedy Boulevard and north through the Spring Garden neighborhood on 20th Street.

During rush hour, the 33 south-bound runs every 5–8 minutes and takes about 10–12 minutes from 20th and Spring Garden to 16th and Market. Likewise, during rush hour, the 33 runs north-bound every 5–8 minutes and takes about 12–14 minutes to get from 15th & John F. Kennedy Boulevard to 20th & Spring Garden.

==== Bus route 2 ====
The 2 bus route runs south through the Spring Garden neighborhood on 17th Street. It continues south on 17th through Center City to South Philadelphia at Oregon Station. The 2 bus route returns north from South Philadelphia, through Center City, on 16th Street.

During rush hour, the 2 south bound runs every 10–13 minutes and takes 9–11 minutes to get from 17th and Spring Garden to 17th and Market. Likewise, during rush hour, the 2 runs north-bound every 11–13 minutes and takes about 10–13 minutes to get from 16th and Market to 16th and Spring Garden.

==== Bus route 7 ====
The 7 bus route runs south along 23rd Street from Brown Street to Spring Garden Street, where it turns southeast on Pennsylvania Avenue to 21st Street. From there, it heads south into Center City. At Market Street, it heads west to 23rd Street and then goes into South Philadelphia along 23rd.

==== Bus route 48 ====
The 48 bus route runs south along 23rd Street from Brown Street to Spring Garden Street, where it turns southeast on Pennsylvania Avenue to 21st Street. From there, it heads south into Center City. At Market Street, it heads east along Market to Front Street. Heading out of Center City, the 48 runs west bound along Arch Street to 22nd Street, where it turns north. Northbound, the 48 travels through the neighborhood on 22nd, crossing Spring Garden Street and Fairmount Avenue.

During rush hour, the 48 south bound runs every 4–6 minutes and takes 9–11 minutes to get from 23rd and Spring Garden to 16th and Market. Likewise, during rush hour, the 48 runs north-bound every 7–8 minutes and takes about 10–13 minutes to get from 22nd and Arch to 22nd and Spring Garden.

==== Bus route 32 ====
The 32 bus route runs southeast along Pennsylvania Avenue, crossing Fairmount Avenue and Spring Garden Street. At Hamilton Street, it heads east to 21st Street. From there, it heads south into Center City. At Market Street, it heads east along Market to Broad Street. From there it heads south along Broad Street to Washington Street, where it turns around. Heading north out of Center City, the 32 runs north bound along Broad Street, goes counter-clockwise around City Hall, and then heads east on John F. Kennedy Boulevard to 18th Street, where it turns north, returning to the Spring Garden neighborhood on its southern and western borders.

During rush hour, the 32 south bound runs every 10–11 minutes and takes 9–11 minutes to get from Pennsylvania Avenue and Spring Garden to 15th and Market. Likewise, during rush hour, the 32 runs north-bound every 10–13 minutes and takes about 10–13 minutes to get from 15th and John F. Kennedy Boulevard to Pennsylvania Avenue and Spring Garden Street.

==== Bus route 43 ====
The 43 bus route runs east and west along Spring Garden Street. Eastbound, the bus takes Spring Garden to Front Street and Delaware Avenue (near the Festival Pier). From there, it heads northbound to Fishtown and Port Richmond. Westbound, the 43 runs along Spring Garden, crosses the Schulykill to Lancaster Avenue, then north on Lancaster Avenue to Belmont Avenue in Parkside.

== Education ==
=== Public schools ===
Spring Garden is in the School District of Philadelphia.

Spring Garden is located in the Laura Wheeler Waring Elementary School catchment, although a significant portion of the neighborhood's elementary-school children who attend public schools attend schools outside the catchment such as Albert M. Greenfield Elementary School. Spring Garden is the home of the Benjamin Franklin High School and Franklin Learning Center, formerly William Penn High School for Girls. Spring Garden is also home of one of the top-ranked public high schools in the city and state, the Julia R. Masterman School at 1699 Spring Garden Street. Although students are, generally, automatically eligible to attend the neighborhood school, they may also attend other Philadelphia Schools (academic magnet schools, performing arts schools, and other out-of-catchment schools) through the school district's Voluntary Transfer Program.

=== Private schools ===
Spring Garden is the home of the J. W. Hallahan Catholic Girls High School. For boys, the Roman Catholic High School is just outside the neighborhood, on the east side of Broad Street. Spring Garden is also the home of the St. Francis Xavier School, a Catholic lower- and middle-school.

== Churches ==
Spring Garden is home to several churches, including St. Andrew's Church (the only Lithuanian-Catholic parish in the city) on 19th and Wallace, St. Francis Xavier Church, at 24th and Green Streets, Olivet Covenant Presbyterian Church, at 22nd and Mount Vernon Streets, Greater Canaan Church of God in Christ, at 21st and Spring Garden, United for Christ Ministries on 21st Street, and Enon Baptist Church at 19th and Green Streets.

== Bibliography ==
- Finkel, Kenneth, ed. (1995). Philadelphia Almanac and Citizens' Manual (1995 ed.). Philadelphia: Library Company of Philadelphia. pp. 156–170. ISBN 0-914076-89-2.
- Philadelphia Information Locator Service (May 20, 1998). "Philadelphia Neighborhoods and Place Names (based on Finkel 1995:156-170.)". City of Philadelphia.
