= Oxford Township, Philadelphia County, Pennsylvania =

Oxford Township
- Former Township
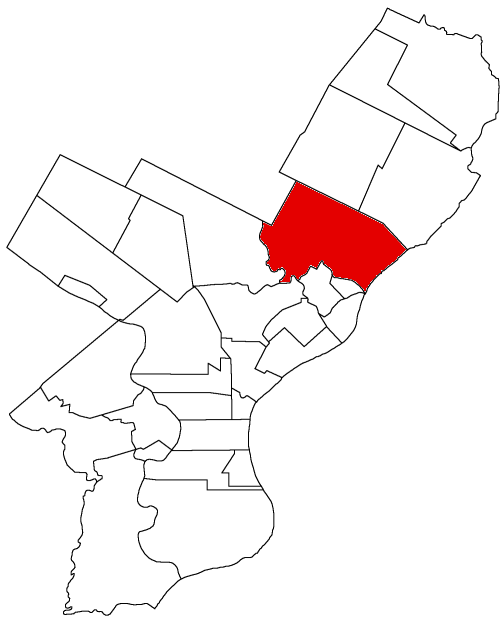
- Map of Philadelphia County, Pennsylvania highlighting Lower Oxford Township prior to the Act of Consolidation, 1854
- Coordinates: 40°01′24″N 75°04′47″W
- Country: United States
- State: Pennsylvania
- County: Philadelphia
- Time zone: UTC-5 (EST)
  - Summer (DST): UTC-4 (EDT)
- Area codes: 215, 267, and 445

Oxford Township was a township in Philadelphia County, Pennsylvania, United States. The township ceased to exist and was incorporated into the City of Philadelphia following the passage of the Act of Consolidation, 1854.

== History ==
A township running from the county line in a southeasterly direction to the Delaware River, and along the same southwestward to Frankford Creek, and up the same northwestwardly to Tacony Creek (Tookany), which it followed until it reached the county line near were the northwestern boundary joined it. Frankford, Whitehall, Cedar Grove and Volunteer Town were in this township, and it also took in the former township of Tacony. Greatest length, three miles; greatest breadth, four miles; area, 7,680 acres (31 km^{2}). It was one of the earliest townships established in Pennsylvania. The township was surrounded by the waters of the Delaware and Frankford Creek on two sides, and was traversed by the Little Tacony and Sissamocksink (Wissinoming) or Little Wahauk Creeks.

== Resources ==
- Chronology of the Political Subdivisions of the County of Philadelphia, 1683-1854 (Daly, John; Weinberg, Allen (October 1966). Genealogy of Philadelphia County Subdivisions (Second ed.). Philadelphia Dept. of Records.)
- Information courtesy of ushistory.org
- Incorporated District, Boroughs, and Townships in the County of Philadelphia, 1854 By Rudolph J. Walther - excerpted from the book at the ushistory.org website
- Ellet, Charles, Jr. Map of the County of Philadelphia from Actual Survey, 1843.
- Dripps, M. Map of the Township of Oxford, Boroughs of Frankford and Bridesburg, 1849.
