= Puerto Ricans in Philadelphia =

Philadelphia has the second largest Puerto Rican community outside of Puerto Rico after New York City. As of the 2010 U.S. census, an estimated 121,643 Puerto Ricans were living in Philadelphia, up from 91,527 in 2000. Recent 2017 estimates by the U.S. Census Bureau put the number of Puerto Ricans living in Philadelphia at 134,934. In 2019, estimates put the number of Puerto Ricans at 146,153. Many Puerto Ricans in the Philadelphia area have engaged in circular migration in which they spend periods of time living in Philadelphia and periods of time living in Puerto Rico.

== History ==
During the late 1800s and early 1900s, Puerto Rican students, laborers, cigar makers, trades people, merchants, and pro-Puerto Rican Independence organizers and exiles emigrated from Puerto Rico and settled in Philadelphia. The tobacco workers liked to hear hired lecturers while working in the factories, they were a self-educated group. In 1910, there were fewer than 100 Puerto Ricans in Philadelphia. In the 1920s, labor recruiters in Philadelphia focused on attracting Puerto Ricans because they were already U.S. citizens: the Immigration Act of 1924 had restricted immigration into the U.S. In the early 20th Century, due to inexpensive housing and the proximity to employment, concentrations of Puerto Ricans moved to Northern Liberties, Southwark, and Spring Garden. Between 1910 and 1945 those three areas had the majority of Philadelphia Hispanophones. Additional Puerto Ricans moved to Philadelphia during World War I, and the period between World War I and World War II.

A mass migration from Puerto Rico to Philadelphia coincided with an industrialization Puerto Rican economy from the late 1940s to 1970. Most Puerto Ricans came from rural areas. During the period many Puerto Ricans worked in factories. Puerto Rican neighborhoods and organizations formed during the area. By the 1950s Puerto Ricans became the largest Latino and Hispanic group in Philadelphia. In the 1950s many pan-Latino areas were becoming predominately Puerto Rican. By 1954, 65% of Puerto Ricans in Philadelphia lived in three neighborhoods north of Center City. In the 1950s Puerto Ricans were settling in those three neighborhoods and two of them became no longer majority white. Spring Garden, the third, remained predominately white. In the period from 1950 to 1970 the Puerto Rican community expanded by over 60,000. By the 1960s an increase of Cubans arrived in Philadelphia, and the proportionate percentage of Puerto Ricans began to decline.

Since 1970, Puerto Ricans coming to Philadelphia have originated from Puerto Rico and from communities outside of Puerto Rico including New York.

Although U.S. citizens, Puerto Ricans migrating to Philadelphia encountered racism, discrimination, and limited economic opportunities, and to some extent, still do. Throughout the 1980s and '90s, the Puerto Rican community was notorious for being heavily involved in the city's drug trade. During that time, the Puerto Rican community was also the poorest of all ethnic communities in the city. Retaining strong ties to the island, they also worked hard to make a home here and build a community structure of businesses, organizations, houses of worship, and other institutions that have become the foundation of Latino life in the city. The Puerto Rican community is credited for revitalizing North 5th Street in North Philadelphia by opening numerous Puerto Rican-owned businesses, they have also done this to Kensington Avenue, and Lehigh Avenue(between 5th and Front Streets). Philadelphia is also one of the few large US cities with a significant number of middle-class Puerto Ricans, though in Philadelphia, even the middle class Puerto Ricans live in segregated communities, thus they are more visible. Philadelphia is often considered a preferred destination among Puerto Rican migrants, because of its position as a Northeastern city and its cheaper cost of living compared to other cities in the Northeast region. Throughout the 1950s, many Puerto Rican migrants settled east and west along Spring Garden Street. Puerto Ricans were not always welcome newcomers, however, and many faced prejudice and discrimination in their neighborhoods. As the Puerto Rican population continued to grow in the 1960s, it expanded east towards the Delaware River and north towards Lehigh Avenue. During the 1980s and 1990s, the Puerto Rican community grew further north into Olney and into the lower sections of the Northeast.

Since 2010, Philadelphia replaced the city of Chicago as the city with the second-largest Puerto Rican population, Chicago's slightly shrunk and Philadelphia's continued to grow, more than ever before, not only having the second largest Puerto Rican population, but also one of the fastest-growing. Most sources, including the most reliable, the United States Census Bureau, estimated that as of 2010, Puerto Ricans made up between 70-80 percent of Philadelphia's Hispanic/Latino population. Other sources put the percentage Puerto Ricans make up of Philadelphia's Hispanic population, as high as 90% and others as low as 64%. The influx of other Latino and Hispanic groups between 2000 and 2010, may have slightly decreased the proportion Puerto Ricans make up of the city's total Latino and Hispanic population. As of 2016, it was estimated that Puerto Ricans accounted for 59 percent of Philadelphia's Latino population, down from 71 percent in 2000. Nonetheless, unlike many other large northern cities, which have declining or slow-growing Puerto Rican populations, Philadelphia has one of the fastest-growing Puerto Rican populations in the country.

With increased crime and unemployment in Puerto Rico, migration from Puerto Rico to the US mainland is at all-time highs, with Pennsylvania being the second most popular destination after Florida. Also, many Puerto Rican Americans ("Nuyoricans") are moving to Philadelphia from states like New York and New Jersey, because of the close proximity and cheaper cost of living when compared to New York City, as well as the similarly large Puerto Rican population. Between 2000 and 2010, over 40% of Puerto Ricans who moved from other US states and Puerto Rico itself to Pennsylvania, moved to the city of Philadelphia, the remaining nearly 60% moved primarily to the South Central and Eastern sections of Pennsylvania, as well as to Philadelphia suburbs. Since Hurricane Maria, there has been another huge increase in Puerto Ricans, with the Philadelphia area being among the most popular destinations outside Florida.

Year	Puerto Rican population in Philadelphia	% of Philadelphia total population
1980	46,587	2.7%
1990	67,857	4.2%
2000	91,527	6.0%
2010	121,643	8.0%
2019	146,153	9.2%
2020	127,114	7.9%

== Geography ==
=== Philadelphia neighborhoods ===
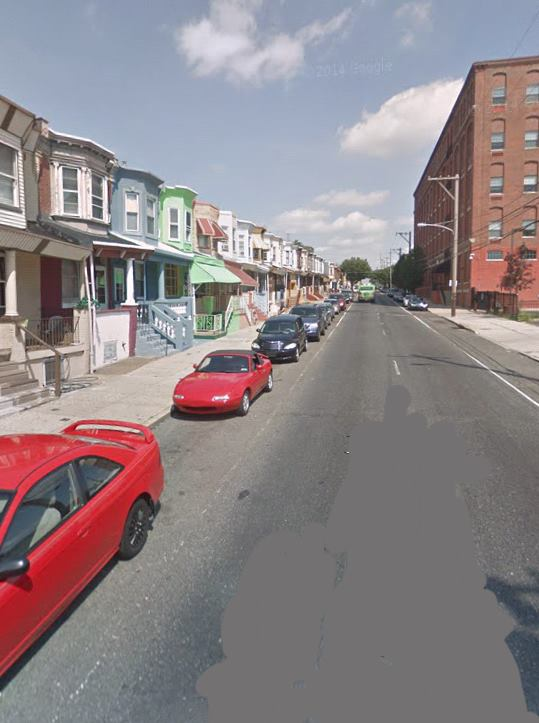
2nd Street just north of Allegheny Avenue, the heart of an area known for having the highest urban concentration of Puerto Ricans outside Puerto Rico

Of Philadelphia's 12 Planning Analysis Sections, the ones with significant Puerto Rican populations include Upper and Lower North Philadelphia, the Kensington section, the Lower Northeast, and the Olney-Oak Lane section locally known as 'Uptown'.

When Puerto Ricans first started settling in Philadelphia they came to the Spring Garden neighborhood. As of 2010, the majority of the Puerto Rican population lives in North Philadelphia, in areas east of Germantown Avenue, between Girard Avenue and Roosevelt Boulevard, in fact, this area has one of the highest concentrations of Puerto Ricans in the country. Especially the blocks between 6th street and B street, north of York street and south of Erie avenue, located in the Fairhill neighborhood, these blocks have some of highest concentrations of Puerto Ricans in the country, with most blocks usually being around 85-90% Puerto Rican alone. This particular area is represented by the zip-codes 19133, 19140, and 19134, though these zip-codes heavily overlap with majority black or white neighborhoods. Fairhill has the highest concentration of Hispanics in the city, a large majority of which, are Puerto Rican. Though, there is also a large Puerto Rican population in Northeast Philadelphia, especially the Kensington section. From these areas, the Puerto Rican population is largely spreading eastward and northward, to other areas in upper North Philadelphia and the lower Northeast, and to a much lesser extent westward as well, to areas around Broad Street. Other parts of the city have smaller populations, including Northwest Philadelphia. On a neighborhood basis, large Puerto Rican populations exist in neighborhoods like Fairhill (locally nicknamed the Badlands), Hunting Park, Juniata, Harrowgate, Kensington, West Kensington, Hartranft, and to a lesser extent, Feltonville, Logan, Olney, Lawncrest, Oxford Circle, Frankford, and Port Richmond. Neighborhoods in eastern North Philadelphia (like Fairhill, Hunting Park) and Kensington tend to be more segregated, with high amounts of poverty and very high percentage of Puerto Rican residents. Neighborhoods further north and northeast, like Olney, Juniata, Lawncrest, and Oxford Circle, tend to be more mixed with large numbers of middle class and working class households, and high integration especially between Puerto Ricans/Hispanics and Blacks.

=== Surrounding metropolitan area ===
Many smaller cities in the Philadelphia metropolitan area, also have large Puerto Rican populations. This includes Norristown, Coatesville, and Chester in Pennsylvania, and Camden, New Jersey and Wilmington, Delaware. Other cities in Southeast Pennsylvania, South Jersey, and Delaware with large Puerto Rican populations, however, are not counted as part of the Philadelphia metropolitan area. There's also a growing number of middle-class Puerto Rican families in the Philadelphia area, especially in Camden County, with many families who can afford to move from impoverished areas of North Philadelphia and the Camden to better off places like Pennsauken for example. Despite the moderately high segregation in the metropolitan area, there are significant Puerto Rican populations scattered throughout the city of Philadelphia and many of the surrounding smaller cities and suburbs. Puerto Ricans represent about 4.5% of the Philadelphia metropolitan area as a whole and 60% of Metro Philly's Latinos, making up the majority of Latinos inside and outside of the city.

== Institutions ==
By the 1950s and into the 1960s and 1970s Puerto Ricans became the leaders of Latino and Hispanic community organizations, which been founded and previously operated by Spaniards and Cubans. By 2005 most of the leadership was still Puerto Rican.

== Recreation ==
There is an annual Puerto Rican Day Parade held in Philadelphia, in late September.

== Notable Puerto Ricans from the Philadelphia area ==
This is a list of notable Puerto Ricans from the Philadelphia region, including Philadelphia/Southeast Pennsylvania, South Jersey, and Delaware, all of which have areas with large numbers of Puerto Ricans.

- Quiara Alegría Hudes - playwright and composer
- Eddie Alvarez - mixed martial artist
- Obie Bermúdez - salsa artist
- Pedro Cortés - politician
- Nelson Diaz - politician
- Danny "Swift" García - boxer
- Reagan Gomez-Preston - actress
- Reggie Jackson - baseball player
- Héctor Andrés Negroni - Colonel (Ret.) United States Air Force.
- Claudette Ortiz - R&B artist
- María Inés Ortiz - U.S. soldier
- Sam Parrilla - baseball player for Philadelphia Phillies
- Roberto A. Rivera-Soto - former Associate Judge
- Gabriel Rosado - boxer
- Juan R. Torruella - politician
- Pedro "Peedi Crakk" Zayas - rapper

== See also ==
- History of Philadelphia
- Demographics of Philadelphia
- El Centro de Oro
- Hispanics and Latinos in New Jersey
- Philadelphia Badlands
- Puerto Ricans in New York City
- Puerto Ricans in the United States
- Puerto Rican people
