= Demographics of Philadelphia =

- Population pyramid of Philadelphia in 2021
- Population: 1,584,064 (2019)

Historical population
Year	Pop.	±%
1683*	600	—
1731*	12,000	+1900.0%
1790	28,522	+137.7%
1800	41,220	+44.5%
1810	53,722	+30.3%
1820	63,802	+18.8%
1830	80,462	+26.1%
1840	93,665	+16.4%
1850	121,376	+29.6%
1860	565,529	+365.9%
1870	674,022	+19.2%
1880	847,170	+25.7%
1890	1,046,964	+23.6%
1900	1,293,697	+23.6%
1910	1,549,008	+19.7%
1920	1,823,779	+17.7%
1930	1,950,961	+7.0%
1940	1,931,334	−1.0%
1950	2,071,605	+7.3%
1960	2,002,512	−3.3%
1970	1,948,609	−2.7%
1980	1,688,210	−13.4%
1990	1,585,577	−6.1%
2000	1,517,550	−4.3%
2010	1,526,006	+0.6%
2019	1,584,064	+3.8%
Populations for City of Philadelphia, not for Philadelphia County. Population for Philadelphia County was 54,388 (including 42,520 urban) in 1790; 81,009 (including 69,403 urban) in 1800; 111,210 (including 91,874 urban) in 1810; 137,097 (including 112,772 urban) in 1820; 188,797 (including 161,410 urban) in 1830; 258,037 (including 220,423 urban) in 1840; and 408,762 (including 340,045 urban) in 1850. Under Act of Consolidation, 1854, City of Philadelphia absorbed the various districts, boroughs, townships, other suburbs, and remaining rural area in Philadelphia County as the consolidated City and County of Philadelphia. Source:

At the 2010 census, there were 1,526,006 people, 590,071 households, and 352,272 families residing in the consolidated city-county of Philadelphia, Pennsylvania. The population density was 4,337.3 people/km^{2} (11,234 people/mi^{2}). There were 661,958 housing units at an average density of 1,891.9 units/km^{2} (4,900 units/mi^{2}).

Of the 590,071 households, 27.6% had children under the age of 18 living with them, 32.1% were married couples living together, 22.3% had a female householder with no husband present, and 40.3% were non-families. 33.8% of households were one person and 11.9% were one person aged 65 or older. The average household size was 2.48 and the average family size was 3.22.

The age distribution was 25.3% under the age of 18, 11.1% from 18 to 24, 29.3% from 25 to 44, 20.3% from 45 to 64, and 14.1% 65 or older. The median age was 34 years. For every 100 females, there were 86.8 males. For every 100 females age 18 and over, there were 81.8 males.

The median household income was $30,746 and the median family income was $37,036. Males had a median income of $34,199 versus $28,477 for females. The per capita income for the city was $16,509. 22.9% of the population and 18.4% of families were below the poverty line. 31.3% of those under the age of 18 and 16.9% of those 65 and older were living below the poverty line.

The male-female ratio was 86.8 to 100, with 46.5% of the population male and 53.5% female. Of places with 100,000 or more people, this was the third lowest in the United States. Only Gary, Indiana and Birmingham, Alabama had a higher proportion of women.

Of housing units, 590,071 (89.1%) were occupied and 71,887 (10.9%) were vacant. Of occupied housing units, 349,633 (59.3%) were owner-occupied and 240,438 (40.7%) were renter-occupied.

The mean travel time to work was 32.0 minutes for workers 16 years of age and older. Residents of Center City, however, had much shorter commutes. Center City has the second largest downtown residential population in the country, surpassing Chicago in 2015, and most walk to work.

63.97% of Philadelphians drove an automobile to work (including carpools), 25.93% commuted by public transit, 9.22% walked to work, and 0.88% commuted by bicycle. 35.74% of households did not have an automobile. The proportion of Philadelphians who do not commute by auto is high compared to most other American cities, although lower than the proportions in New York City and Washington, D.C.

== Population history ==
From its founding in the 17th century through the early 19th century, the City of Philadelphia was considered the area between the Delaware and Schuylkill Rivers and between Vine and South Streets. Although the city proper was second to New York City in population at the time of the first U.S. Census in 1790, Philadelphia County was the most populous urban (or metropolitan) area in the nation until 1810, when it was surpassed by New York. In 1854, the Act of Consolidation incorporated the rest of Philadelphia County and created Philadelphia's modern border. This resulted in a large population increase, evident in the 1860 census.

Philadelphia experienced steady growth between 1860 and 1950, except for a brief lull in the 1930s, which was due in part to the Great Depression. Its population peaked at 2,071,605 in 1950. Between 1950 and 2000, the city lost 554,055 people, or 26.7% of its population. To put this into perspective, Chicago lost 20.0% of its population during the same era, and Baltimore lost 31.4%, according to US Census data. This nationwide trend is often referred to as "white flight", named for the movement of upper- and middle-class white families from the racially evolving cities in favor of more racially homogeneous (white) suburbs.

In 2011, census data was released showing that Philadelphia had achieved its first confirmed population growth in 60 years. The increase was 0.6 percent. It is attributed to a variety of factors, including increased immigration (especially from countries like India, South Korea and Mexico) and migration from more expensive cities in the Northeast Corridor. Between 2000 and 2010, the city's Hispanic population increased by 44 percent to 187,611 and its Asian population grew by 42 percent to 95,521. Wealthy transplants, Asian American investors from New York City, and African Americans from Washington, D.C. have received media attention for setting their sights on Philadelphia. The ten-year tax abatement, a historically undervalued housing market, improvements to the waterfront, and continuing redevelopment throughout the city are thought to be factors drawing people to the area.

== Ethnography ==
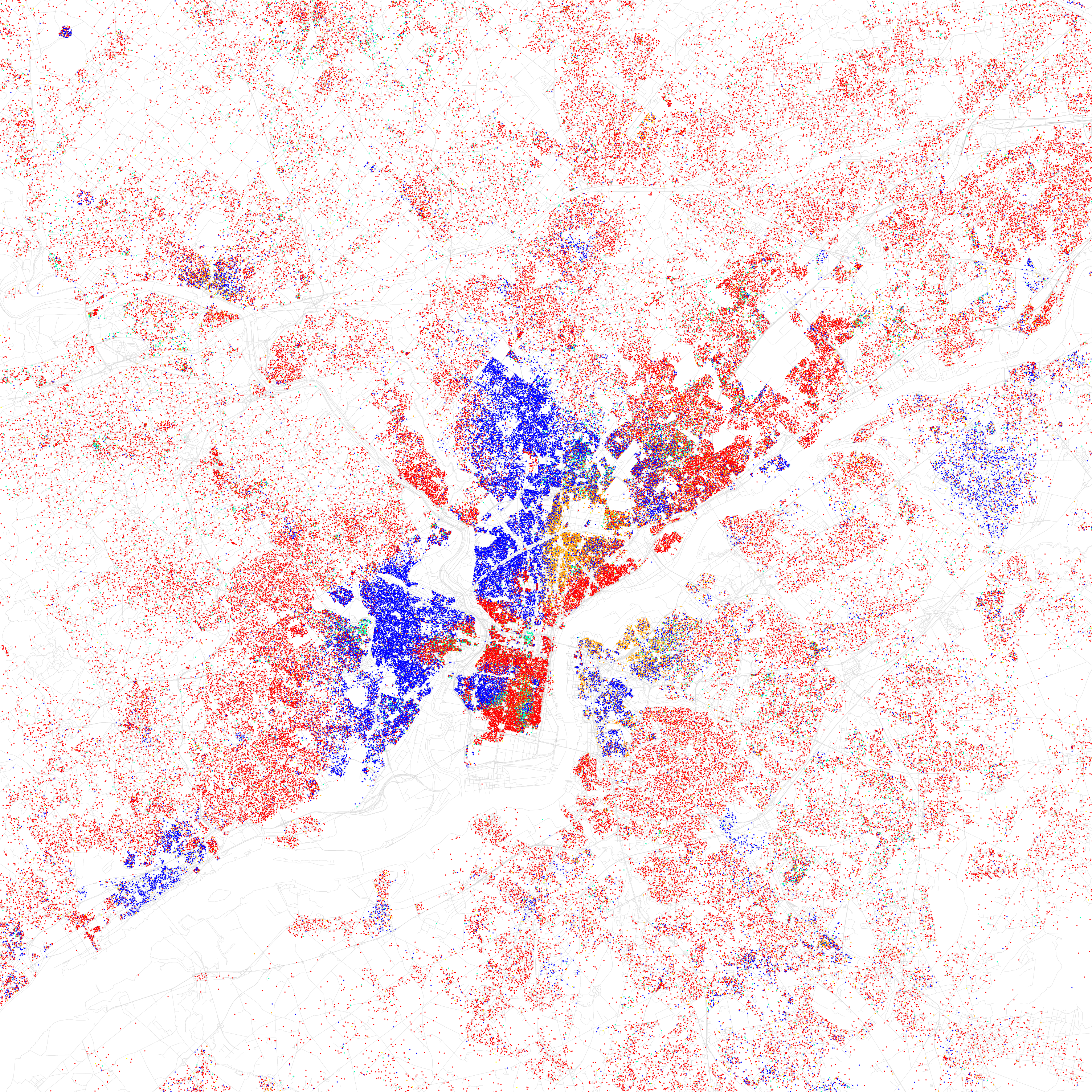
2010 map of racial distribution in Philadelphia, based on U.S. Census data. Each dot represents 25 people: White, Black, Asian, Hispanic, or Other (yellow)

For most of its early history from the 1600s and up until the mid to late 1800s, the vast majority of Philadelphia's population was Protestant and composed mainly of Protestant Anglo-Saxon English Americans, many of whom were Quakers or of Quaker descent. The city also contained significant populations of free Blacks, Welsh Americans, including a great number of Welsh Quakers, such as in the Welsh Tract; Scottish Americans, Ulster Scots Americans, and Pennsylvania Dutch, most notably the German American Mennonites and German Quakers that founded Germantown, as well as the Protestant Swedish American, Finnish American, and Dutch American families that had originally arrived in the Philadelphia area to live in the colony of New Sweden, later taken over by the Dutch colony of New Netherlands before being absorbed into the British colonies. The roots of the Mummers Parade can be traced back to a blend of the traditions of these ethnic groups in Philadelphia during this period, though the celebration would evolve and be altered by the traditions of subsequent immigrant groups.

=== First immigrant wave ===
Prior to the 1820s, the overwhelming majority of German and German-speaking settlers in Philadelphia such as the Pennsylvania Dutch had belonged to Protestant sects. Starting around the 1820s, an increasing number of poor Catholic Germans began to immigrate to Philadelphia, though most German immigrants to Philadelphia continued to be Protestant. By the 1840s, in response to the starvation and poverty that would lead to Great Famine of Ireland, a growing number of impoverished Irish Catholic immigrants began to settle in Philadelphia, leading to a rise in anti-Catholicism, nativism, and anti-Irish sentiment among the majority Protestant population in the city. Hatred for the newly arrived Irish Catholic immigrants culminated in the bloody anti-Irish, anti-Catholic Philadelphia Nativist Riot of 1844 and fueled the rise of the Know-Nothing Party in Philadelphia. At the same time, as the number of poor and unskilled Irish Catholic and German immigrants increased, Philadelphia experienced an increase in freed and fugitive slaves from the South seeking refuge and employment in the city. Both blacks and Irish Catholics were at the bottom of the social hierarchy in Philadelphia at the time, and poor Irish immigrants often competed with African American ex-slaves for menial or unskilled work. The competition between the two ethnic groups led to the 1842 Lombard Street Riot. Also, beginning in the mid to late 1800s, immigrants from China began to settle in Philadelphia, establishing Philadelphia's Chinatown and further diversifying the city's demographics.

=== Second immigrant wave ===
Like its other immigrant-magnet peers in the Northeast, starting in the late 19th and early 20th centuries, Philadelphia experienced an unprecedented heightened level of immigration. This period of immigration consisted of mainly impoverished Catholic and Jewish, and, to a lesser extent, Orthodox Christian immigrants from Southern European and Eastern European countries such as Italy and Poland, as well as a second wave of Catholic immigrants from Ireland. Around this same time, an increasing number of African Americans from the Southern United States began to settle in Philadelphia during the Great Migration.

Though Italians in Philadelphia would experience high levels of discrimination and prejudice, including intense redlining, Italians in Philadelphia also significantly altered the culture of Philadelphia and the cuisine, creating the Philadelphia Italian Market, the cheesesteak, the hoagie, and water ice, and introducing pizza and other Italian cuisine to the city. Italian and Irish immigrants and their children in South Philadelphia also revived, altered, and continued the Philadelphia tradition of the Mummers Parade.

=== 1940s to present ===
Since the 1940s, Philadelphia experienced large waves of Puerto Rican migration. They remain an integral part of the city and a sizable swath of eastern North Philadelphia is considered to have the highest urban concentration of Puerto Ricans in the continental United States. The number of Hispanics and Asian Americans has increased over the past 20 years and continues to accelerate. The number of foreign-born residents increased by 34,000 between 1990 and 2000. Of foreign-born Philadelphians, 38.5% were from Asia, 30.3% were from Europe, 23.4% were from Latin America, and 6.7% were from Africa.

Recent immigrants from Asia are mainly of Indian, Korean, Chinese, Vietnamese, Laotian, Hmong, Filipino, Cambodian, Thai, Pakistani and Bangladeshi backgrounds. In addition, the Latino population continues to grow, as Dominican, Mexican, Colombian, Salvadoran, Guatemalan, Cuban, Honduran and Brazilian immigrants. Puerto Rican often choose Philadelphia when moving to the US mainland. Immigration from various Caribbean countries has also increased substantially since the 1940s. Immigrants from Africa, mainly West Africa and, to a lesser extent, Ethiopia, have also established significant communities in the city.

=== Non-Hispanic White people ===
Large concentrations of non-Hispanic whites live in Center City, Northeast Philadelphia, and Northwest Philadelphia. Gentrification is altering the racial demographics of predominantly Black neighborhoods close to Center City.

European immigration is also growing, with more Irish, Italian, and Polish immigrants. Recently, thousands of Russian and Ukrainian immigrants from Eastern Europe, many of whom are Jewish have arrived, mainly in Northeast Philadelphia. There are other growing nationalities, which include Armenian, Spanish, Portuguese, Slovak, Greek and Serbian.

==== Armenians ====
As of 2012, there were about 25,000 people of Armenian ancestry in the Philadelphia area and/or in South Jersey. The Hamidian massacres prior to the beginning of the 20th century, and subsequent Adana massacre of 1909 and Armenian genocide prompted Armenian immigration to the U.S. There is an Armenian day school in Upper Merion Township, Armenian Sisters Academy (ASA), with a Radnor postal address.

==== Dutch ====
The Dutch settled in Philadelphia.

==== French ====
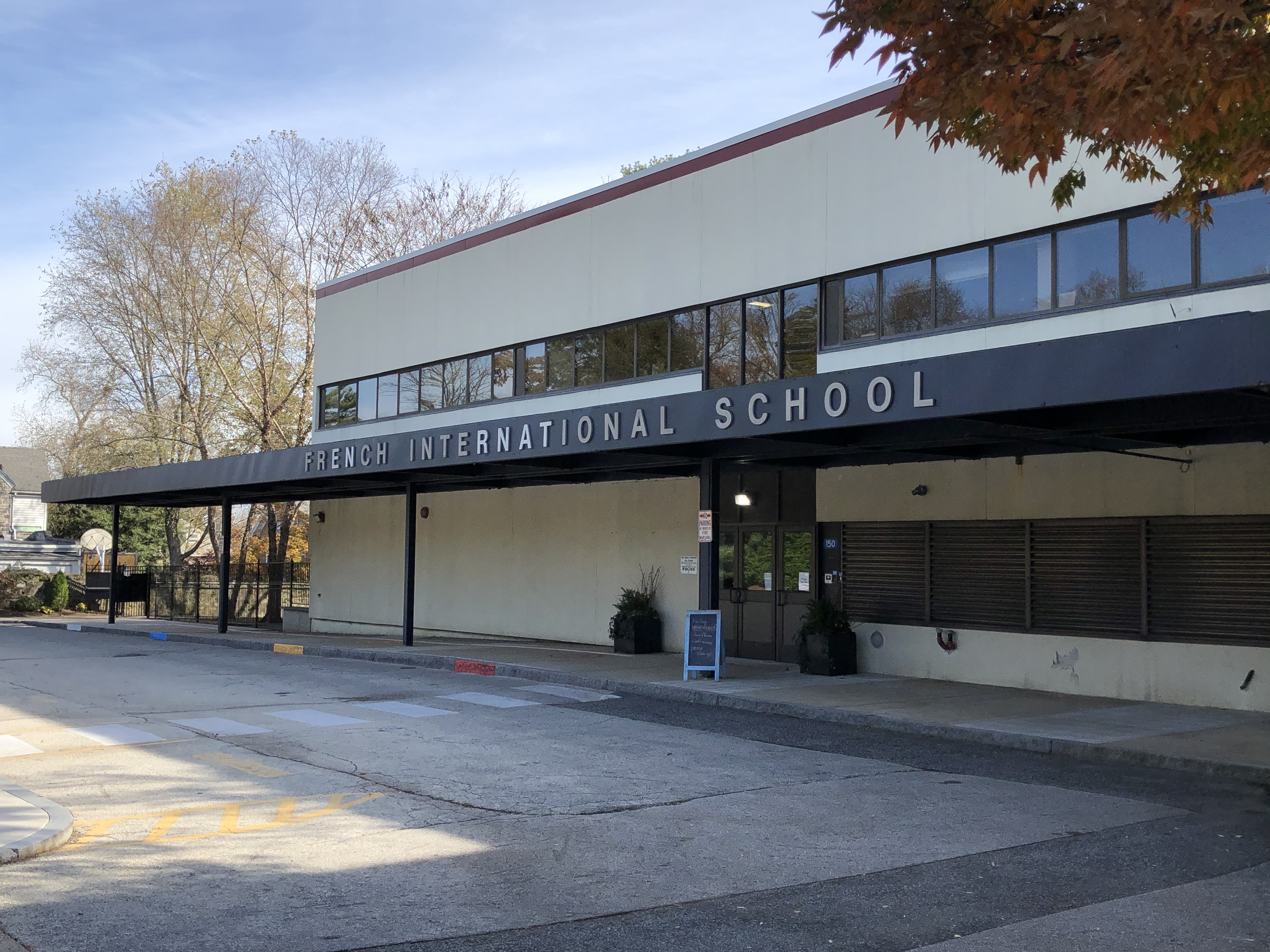
French International School of Philadelphia

There is a French community in Philadelphia. French International School of Philadelphia is in Bala Cynwyd.

==== Germans ====
Around 65,000 Germans settled in Philadelphia between 1727 and 1775. Nowadays, it is estimated that over 500,000 people in the Philadelphia metropolitan area have German heritage.

==== Greeks ====
There is a Greek community and a Greektown in Philadelphia.

==== Irish ====
Irish immigrants and the Irish Americans are associated in the North and Northeast Philadelphia neighborhoods, including Fishtown, Kensington, Mayfair, Frankford, Port Richmond, Holmesburg, Harrowgate, and Juniata, as well as Devil's Pocket, Whitman, Gray's Ferry, and particularly Pennsport in South Philadelphia. Philadelphia has the 2nd largest Irish American population in the country.

In the 1960s, many of the Irish in Philadelphia were known to join the Philadelphia Police Department and Philadelphia Fire Department.

==== Italians ====
Italian immigrants and the Italian American community are frequently associated with South Philadelphia, including Bella Vista, Central South Philadelphia, Girard Estates, Marconi Plaza, Packer Park, and the Philadelphia Italian Market area. In Northeast Philadelphia and Northwest Philadelphia, Italian neighborhoods are found in Roxborough, Frankford, Wissinoming and Tacony, among others. West Philadelphia also has a smaller but significant Italian and Italian American population in certain neighborhoods. Philadelphia has the 2nd largest Italian American population in the U.S.

==== Polish ====
Poles and Polish Americans, as well as Polish Jews, have a rich history in the Port Richmond-Bridesburg area, as well as areas of Kensington and the Northeast.

==== Scots Irish ====
There is a Scotch Irish community in Philadelphia.

==== Slovaks ====
There is a Slovak community in Philadelphia.

=== Non-Hispanic Black people ===
Non-Hispanic Black people make up 32% of Philadelphia's population, and 44% when including Hispanic Black people. The African-American population represents the vast majority of Black residents in the city and about 39% of the citywide population. The remaining Black population being Black immigrants from the Caribbean and Africa, and Afro-Hispanics within the Puerto Rican and Dominican communities.

Circa 2008, a phenomenon of polygamy occurred among Muslims in Philadelphia who were Black. Persons engaging in that behavior had the potential of being prosecuted by the state government for bigamy.

==== African Americans ====
The largest concentrations of native-born Black people are in Germantown, North Philadelphia East of Germantown Avenue, the Point Breeze neighborhood of South Philadelphia, parts of Southwest Philadelphia, and West Philadelphia. Together these neighborhoods have a population of about 610,000 and are roughly 82% black; making it the 4th largest predominantly Black area in the United States after Bedford-Stuyvesant, Brooklyn, Detroit, and South Side Chicago. Philadelphia has one of the largest African American communities in the US.

==== African immigrant groups ====
Philadelphia has one of the most notable West African populations in the United States. As of 2010, there were 25,570 people of recent African origins living in Philadelphia. The largest Sub-Saharan African populations within the city are Nigerians and Liberians.

In 2005, Philadelphia had immigrants from Ethiopia, Ghana, the Ivory Coast, Liberia, Nigeria, and Sierra Leone. By 2008, about 15,000 Liberians had immigrated to Philadelphia area, the Liberians left their native country due to two civil wars and the destruction of Liberian infrastructure. The African population is largely concentrated in West and Southwest sections of Philadelphia. However, the Cedar Park neighborhood is the only neighborhood predominantly made up of West Indian/Caribbean and Sub-Saharan African immigrants.

Around 2005, there had been instances of violence perpetrated by native-born African-Americans against African immigrants. The head of the Liberian Association of Pennsylvania, Samuel Slewion, said that as a result many African immigrants withdrew children from public schools. The head of African Congress USA, Cyprian Anyanwu, proposed a charter school to improve relations between native-born blacks and immigrants; his 2003 proposal was rejected by the city, and he issued a revised proposal in 2005.

By 2024 there was a campaign to designate a part of Southwest Philadelphia as "Africatown".

==== Caribbean-Americans ====
Philadelphia also has a large West Indian community from the Caribbean islands. The West Indian population is largely concentrated in West Philadelphia, with smaller numbers in the Southwest and Northeast sections. As of 2010, there were 24,608 people of West Indian ancestry living in Philadelphia, representing about 1.6 percent of the city, the vast majority of which are Haitians and Jamaicans. Though, the number of West Indians balloons when including other areas in the Philadelphia metropolitan area and not just the city itself. The Philadelphia area has one of the largest Jamaican populations in the country. Jamaicans.com features Philadelphia and Jamaican culture in the city. Most West Indians live in West and Southwest Philadelphia. However, the Cedar Park neighborhood is the only neighborhood predominantly made up of West Indian/Caribbean and African immigrants.

Though, Haitians and Jamaicans are near even in population, Jamaicans represent the majority of West Indians in West Philadelphia, where most of the overall West Indian population lives. This is because Haitians are more evenly distributed throughout the city, outside of West Philadelphia, there are smaller numbers of Haitians in several neighborhoods in the Lower Northeast. Aside from Haitians and Jamaicans, there are also sizable numbers of Trinidadians and Bajans.

=== Hispanics and Latinos ===
As of the 2010 census, there were 187,611 Latinos and Hispanics in Philadelphia, constituting over 12 percent of the city's population, the vast majority of which are Puerto Ricans. Most Philadelphia Hispanics self-identify as either White, Black, Mixed, or other, for government purposes i.e. United States Census.

In the early 20th century, companies such as the Pennsylvania Railroad and Spanish-speaking immigrant networks attracted Spanish-speaking workers to Philadelphia. By 1910 several Latino and Hispanic groups had resided in Philadelphia. Cubans and Spaniards founded and initially lead the Latino and Hispanic community organizations. Due to the Immigration Act of 1924 Puerto Ricans, who were already U.S. citizens, became the predominant Hispanic group and had taken control of the organizations by the 1950s. Other Latino and Hispanic groups began establishing themselves by the 1960s. By 2005, most of the leadership was still Puerto Rican and some non-Puerto Ricans had taken some leadership positions

==== Puerto Ricans ====
As of 2010, there was a population of 121,643 Puerto Ricans living in Philadelphia. This meant that Puerto Ricans are the largest Latino group in the city and that Philadelphia has the second largest Puerto Rican population, after New York City. Though, smaller numbers of Puerto Ricans can be found throughout the city, overall, eastern North Philadelphia has one of the highest concentrations of Puerto Ricans in the country, largely the result of high levels of segregation and a very large Puerto Rican population.

Philadelphia has been a heavy Puerto Rican destination since the 1950s, though migration to the city has picked up and now Philadelphia has one of the fastest-growing Puerto Rican populations in the country. Puerto Ricans constitute over 75% of the Latino population in the city. Most Puerto Ricans live in the areas of North Philadelphia east of Germantown Avenue (eastern North Philadelphia), and to a lesser extent the Lower Northeast and Uptown sections of the city. In fact, the Fairhill section of Eastern North Philadelphia, particularly the blocks between 6th Street and B Street, north of York Street and south of Erie Avenue, have some of highest concentrations of Puerto Ricans in the country, with most blocks usually being around 85-90% Puerto Rican alone, with most of the remaining portion made up of Dominicans and African Americans. Increases in Latino immigration and migration have fueled the growth of El Centro de Oro in Fairhill.

Puerto Ricans make up the majority of Hispanics inside of the city of Philadelphia and in the Philadelphia metropolitan area as whole, numbering about 300,000 in far southeastern Pennsylvania (around Philadelphia), and neighboring areas in New Jersey and Delaware, making up 60% of Metro Philly's Hispanics and 4.5% of Philadelphia metro as a whole. Many Puerto Ricans in Philadelphia have engaged in circular migration in which they spend periods of time living in Philadelphia and periods of time living in Puerto Rico.

==== Dominicans ====
As of the 2010 census, there were 15,963 Dominicans in Philadelphia, up from 4,337 in 2000. Dominicans are now the second-largest Hispanic group in Philadelphia and the city has the 6th largest Dominican population in the US.

Dominicans began coming to Philadelphia after 1965. Prior to 1990, there was a very small population of Dominicans. Then a significant wave of Dominican immigration started in 1990 with a group of Dominicans moving from New York to gain jobs. Though, immigration from the Dominican Republic to the Philadelphia region is increasing, most Dominicans moving to Philadelphia actually come from New York City and other nearby areas. The vast majority of Dominicans live scattered in Lower Northeast and eastern North Philadelphia especially north of Erie Avenue, sharing neighborhoods with the city's larger Puerto Rican population. Smaller numbers of Dominicans live in West Philadelphia. Recent estimates have the current Dominican population according to the 2017 Census from 29,524 to as high as 65,000 people of Dominican descent, the latter estimate giving Philadelphia the second-largest Dominican population amongst American cities. Only New York, NY has more Dominican Americans. Dominicans are one of Philadelphia's fastest growing ethnic groups.

==== Mexicans ====
As of the 2010 U.S. census there were an estimated 15,531 Mexicans in Philadelphia, up from 6,220 in 2000.

A small group of Mexicans arrived in the 19th Century. A small group of Mexicans remained throughout the city's history. A group of Mexicans arrived in the 1970s. Small Mexican communities in South Philadelphia opened as a result of a 1990s wave of Mexican immigration. Another wave of immigration started in 1998 with Mexicans arriving from Mexico and areas outside of Mexico such as New York.

Most of Philadelphia's Mexican community lives in the area of South Philadelphia east of Broad Street, adding to the area's melting pot like cultural mix, sharing neighborhoods with Italian Americans and Asian immigrants. As of 2011 most Mexicans in South Philadelphia originate from the state of Puebla. Mexican immigrants have drastically changed the Italian area in South Philadelphia and have set up a small community in and around the market.

The Carnaval de Puebla, one of the largest Poblano carnivals (a celebration of the Battle of Puebla) held in countries other than Mexico, began circa 2006. It is held every May.

By 2017, ethnic Mexicans in South Philadelphia began selling Mexican pizzas, that is pizzas with Mexican-style toppings and ingredients. This style was developed through Mexican immigrants working in Italian American-style businesses. By 2023 the food expanded into surrounding counties.

As of 2025, the Mexican community in South Philadelphia continues to grow with estimates totaling around 20,000 people. Various well known restaurants, supermarkets, bakeries, and candy stores have been established in different parts of South Philadelphia primarily South of Washington Avenue from 10th Street to the West, 4th Street to the East, and as far South as Oregon Avenue.

==== Cubans ====
As of the 2010 census, there was an estimate of 3,930 Cubans. Cubans, along with Spaniards, had founded and initially controlled several Latino and Hispanic organizations in Philadelphia. In the early 1960s large numbers of Cuban refugees arrived in Philadelphia.

==== Other Latino and Hispanic groups ====
As of the 2010 census, Hispanics of all other Hispanic groups numbered nearly 30,000, including an estimate of 4,675 Colombians, 2,262 Guatemalans, 1,641 Hondurans, 1,542 Ecuadorians, 1,085 Peruvians, 1,049 Salvadorans, 1,006 Argentineans.

=== Asian Americans ===
The Asian American community has long been established in the city's bustling Chinatown district, but recent Vietnamese immigrants have also forged neighborhoods and bazaars alongside the venerable Italian market. Korean immigrants have notably added to the melting pot of Olney. In several decades before 2010, the cost of living in Chinatown increased due to an influx in settlement, so Asian Americans began moving to other neighborhoods in northwestern Philadelphia, northeastern Philadelphia, and South Philadelphia. As of January 22, 2010, according to David Elesh, a Temple University urban sociologist, there were almost 60,000 Philadelphia residents who stated that they were born in China and many of them lived in South Philadelphia.

There is an ethnic Pakistani congregation at St. William Church in Philadelphia.

In 1999 there were about 1,500 people who were Japanese citizens with non-immigrant visas or Japanese immigrants to the Philadelphia area. There is a weekend school for Japanese people, Japanese Language School of Philadelphia (JLSP, フィラデルフィア日本語補習授業校 Firaderufia Nihongo Hoshū Jugyō Kō) located in Wynnewood, Lower Merion Township.

==== Cambodians ====
Philadelphia has a Cambodian community, including Khmer people from the country of Cambodia, Vietnamese Cambodians (from the country of Cambodia, with Kinh Vietnamese ethnicity), Khmer Krom, and Chinese Cambodians.

There is a Southeast Asian market held at Franklin Delano Roosevelt Park which has Cambodian food and cultural items, along with such from Laos. The market started operations in the 1980s with it originating from a Lao family.

==== Hmong ====
A group of Hmong refugees had settled in Philadelphia after the end of the 1970s Laotian Civil War. They were attacked in discriminatory acts, and the city's Commission on Human Relations held hearings on the incidents. Anne Fadiman, author of The Spirit Catches You and You Fall Down, said that lower-class residents resented the Hmong receiving a $100,000 federal grant for employment assistance when they were also out of work; they believed that American citizens should be getting assistance. Bee Xiong, a Hmong leader in Philadelphia, stated that by the late 1970s there were up to 5,000 Hmong in Philadelphia but by in 1984 there were 650 Hmong. Between 1982 and 1984, three quarters of the Hmong people who had settled in Philadelphia left for other cities in the United States to join relatives who were already there. Reverend Edward V. Avery, a Roman Catholic priest quoted in The Philadelphia Inquirer, stated that unemployed black youths questioned why Hmong people instead of native-born U.S. citizens received the federal aid, and that contributed to violence against Hmong people. A U.S. Attorney, Edward S.G. Dennis, had begun an investigation by 1984. His office asked the Federal Bureau of Investigation (FBI) to determine if there was a hate crime. By the same year Xiong opened an employment assistance office to stabilize what was left of the Hmong population. He had used $100,000 in federal grants.

==== Japanese ====
There is the Japanese Language School of Philadelphia or JLSP (フィラデルフィア日本語補習授業校, Firaderufia Nihongo Hoshū Jugyō Kō), a part-time Japanese school in Wynnewood, Lower Merion Township. It was established in 1972 In February 1999 enrollment was about 230. Kizo Saito, sent by the Japanese government, served as principal from 1996 to 1999. It had 250 students in November 1999. In 2007 it had about 230 students. It serves Japanese families in the Lehigh Valley area.

As of 2023 there is one Japanese grocery store in the Philadelphia area, Maido, in Ardmore. Maido was previously in Narberth, but moved to Ardmore in 2013. According to the owners, the new location is convenient to families of the Japanese school.

==== Korean ====
In 2008 about 15,000 ethnic Koreans lived in the Philadelphia area. In a period prior to 2008 a Koreatown around Olney, Philadelphia developed. By 2008 the spread of businesses went further north, onto Cheltenham Avenue. An H Mart and other businesses opened in Elkins Park. There were also Korean restaurants in Upper Darby, Cherry Hill, New Jersey, and in Montgomery County, including in Blue Bell.

By 2018 Korean restaurants began to open in Center City.

=== Native Americans ===
About 13,000 Philadelphians identified as Native American on the 2010 census. What is now the Philadelphia region is the ancestral territory of the Lenni Lenape, but by the mid-19th century violence and fraudulent land purchases had driven most of them out of Pennsylvania and the 21st century Native American community includes members of many other nations as well.

=== Romani ===
Some Macedonian Romani people live in Philadelphia.

== Statistics ==
=== Racial and ethnic composition ===
Philadelphia County, Pennsylvania – Racial and ethnic composition Note: the US Census treats Hispanic/Latino as an ethnic category. This table excludes Latinos from the racial categories and assigns them to a separate category. Hispanics/Latinos may be of any race.
Race / Ethnicity (NH = Non-Hispanic)	Pop 1980	Pop 1990	Pop 2000	Pop 2010	Pop 2020	% 1980	% 1990	% 2000	% 2010	% 2020
White alone (NH)	963,469	825,839	644,395	562,585	550,828	57.07%	52.08%	42.46%	36.87%	34.35%
Black or African American alone (NH)	633,485	623,510	646,123	644,287	613,835	37.52%	39.32%	42.58%	42.22%	38.27%
Native American or Alaska Native alone (NH)	2,325	3,144	2,908	3,498	2,596	0.14%	0.20%	0.19%	0.23%	0.16%
Asian alone (NH)	17,764	42,156	67,119	95,521	132,408	1.05%	2.66%	4.42%	6.26%	8.26%
Native Hawaiian or Pacific Islander alone (NH)	x	x	495	457	579	x	x	0.03%	0.03%	0.04%
Other race alone (NH)	7,597	1,735	2,856	4,105	11,419	0.45%	0.11%	0.19%	0.27%	0.71%
Mixed race or Multiracial (NH)	x	x	24,726	27,942	53,855	x	x	1.63%	1.83%	3.36%
Hispanic or Latino (any race)	63,570	89,193	128,928	187,611	238,277	3.77%	5.63%	8.50%	12.29%	14.86%
Total	1,688,210	1,585,577	1,517,550	1,526,006	1,603,797	100.00%	100.00%	100.00%	100.00%	100.00%

Historical racial demographics of Philadelphia County
Demographic profile	1850	1860	1870	1880	1900	1910	1920	1930	1940	1950	1960	1970	1980	1990	2000	2010	2020
Non-Hispanic White alone	94.3%	96.7%	96.1%	95.9%	94.9%	94.0%	91.7%	88.3%	87.0%	–	72.2%	64.1%	57.1%	52.1%	42.5%	36.9%	34.4%
Non-Hispanic Black alone	5.6%	2.8%	3.8%	3.7%	4.6%	5.6%	7.9%	11.2%	12.5%	–	26.3%	33.2%	37.5%	39.3%	42.6%	42.2%	38.3%
Hispanic or Latino, any race(s)	0.1%	0.4%	0.1%	0.3%	0.2%	0.3%	0.3%	0.4%	0.4%	–	1.2%	2.1%	3.8%	5.6%	8.5%	12.3%	14.9%
Non-Hispanic Asian and Pacific Islander alone	–	–	–	–	–	–	–	–	–	–	–	–	1.1%	2.8%	4.6%	6.5%	9.0%
Non-Hispanic Native American	–	–	–	–	–	–	–	–	–	–	–	–	–	–	–	–	–
Non-Hispanic Other	–	–	–	–	–	–	–	–	–	–	–	–	0.1%	0.1%	1.9%	2.3%	4.6%
Non-Hispanic Two or more races	–	–	–	–	–	–	–	–	–	–	–	–	–	–	–	–	–

== Religion ==
Christianity is the dominant religion in the city of Philadelphia. According to a 2014 study by the Pew Research Center, 68% of the population of the city identified themselves as Christians. The majority of the population is Protestant, with the various Protestant and non-Catholic Christian denominations combined make up a majority of the Christian population at approximately 42% of the city's population; however, the largest single Christian denomination is Roman Catholic, at 26%. Metropolitan Philadelphia's Jewish population, the sixth largest in the United States, was estimated at 206,000 in 2001.

Many other religions have arrived in the 21st century, including Islam and Hinduism. With immigration from the Middle East, the Horn of Africa, Pakistan, Bangladesh and India, these two religions have increased their presence. The largest concentrations of Muslims and Hindus live in the Northeast and North parts of the city, Center City, West Philadelphia, and sprawling into the nearby suburbs.

The Muslim African American community in Philadelphia has grown substantially over the last decade. According to several statistics, Philadelphia has surpassed Detroit and New York City to become the American metropolitan area with the highest proportion of Muslims.

Religions with less numerous adherents can also be found. There are pockets of Buddhists in Center City, Chinatown, Northeast Philly, and other neighborhoods with significant Asian American populations. There are Caribbean and African traditional religions in North and West Philadelphia. These numbers are also growing. Historically the city has strong connections to The Religious Society of Friends, Unitarian Universalism, and Ethical Culture, all of which continue to be represented in the city. The Friends General Conference is based in Philadelphia. African diasporic religions are popular in Hispanic and Caribbean communities in North and West Philadelphia.

== Ancestries ==
Ancestry by origin	Number	%
American	32,573	
Arab	13,590	

== Languages ==
Languages spoken other than English and Spanish are Russian (5.1%), French (5.5%), Arabic (6.5%), Vietnamese (6.9%), Haitian Creole (8.3%), Chinese Mandarin (13.2%) and Portuguese.

== Sources and further reading ==
- U.S. Census website, US Census.
- Philadelphia in Focus: A Profile from Census 2000, Brookings Institution, November 2003.
- Licht, Walter (1992). Getting Work: Philadelphia, 1840-1950. Cambridge, Massachusetts, USA: Harvard University Press. ISBN 978-0-8122-1719-3. LCCN 91035021.. A discussion of how Philadelphia workers found jobs and how employers found workers, including how the process was affected by race, ethnicity, origin (immigrant versus native-born), industrial sector, unionization, and other demographic differences.
- "A City Transformed: The Racial and Ethnic Changes in Philadelphia Over the Last 20 Years." Pew Charitable Trusts Philadelphia Research Initiative. June 1, 2011. (Archive)
- "A study of Southeast Asian youth in Philadelphia: A final report." United States Office of Refugee Resettlement, 1988.
- Cambodian Association of Greater Philadelphia
