= Lower North Philadelphia =

Coordinates: 39.98093°N 75.16388°W

- Neighborhood of Philadelphia
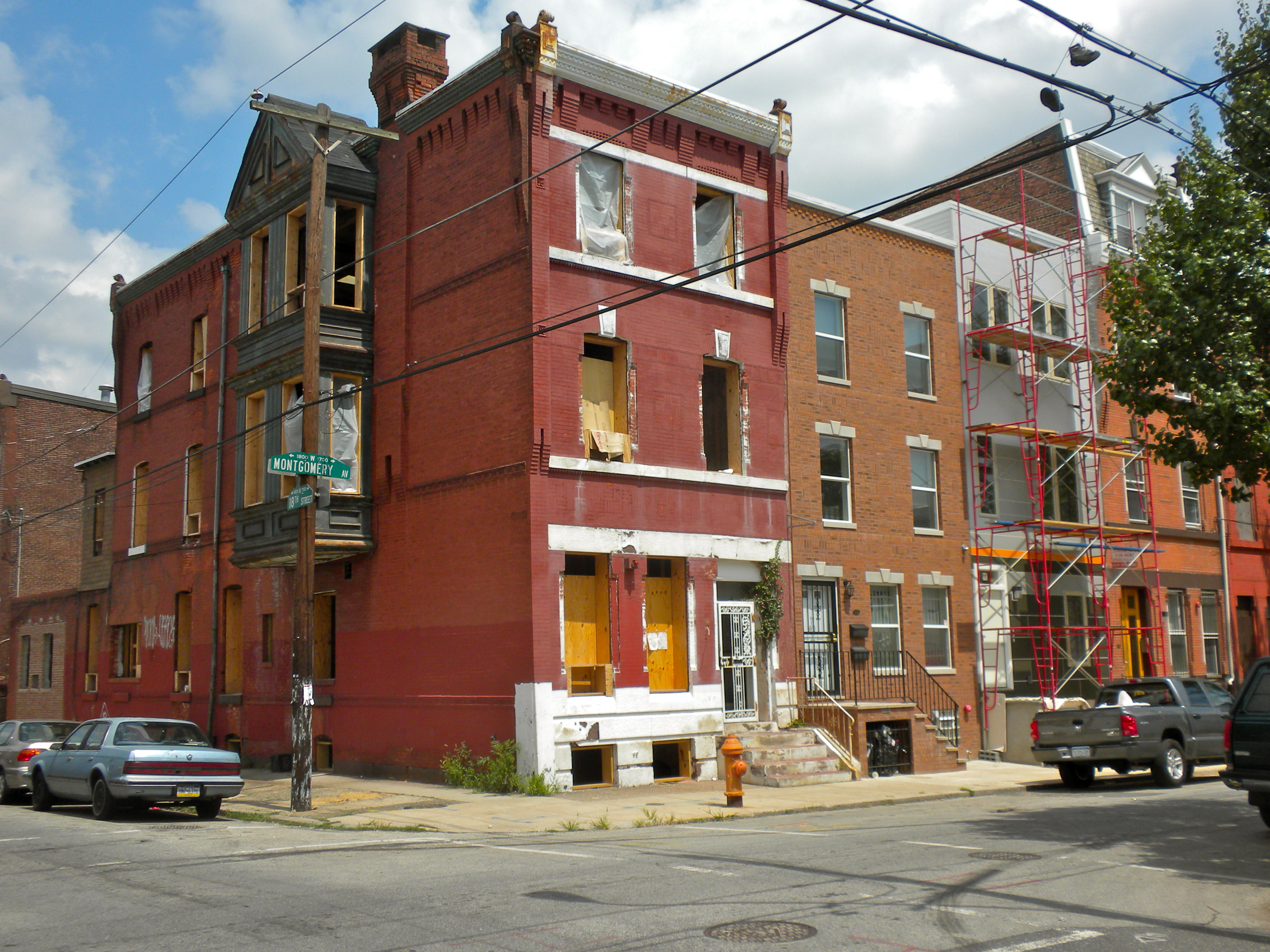
- Lower North Philadelphia at Montgomery Avenue and 18th Street

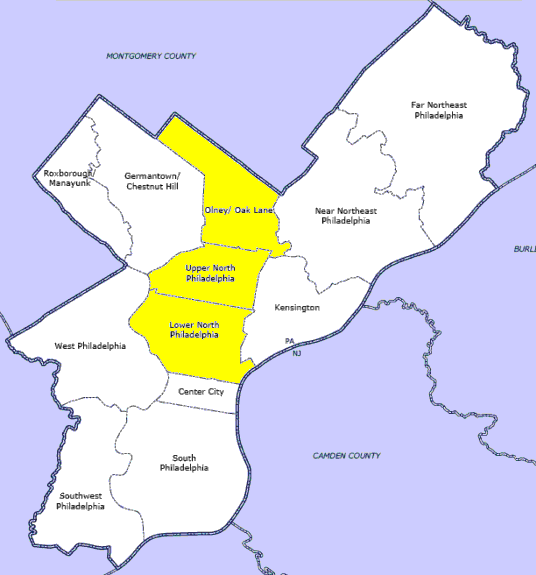
- Map of Philadelphia County with North Philadelphia highlighted. Click for larger image
- Country: United States of America
- State: Pennsylvania
- County: Philadelphia
- City: Philadelphia

Area
  - Total: 2.3 sq mi (6.0 km^{2})

Population (2010)
  - Total: 59,250
  - Density: 14,736/sq mi (5,690/km^{2})

Demographics
  - White: 33.2%
  - Black: 47.2%
  - Native: 0.7%
  - Asian: 6.1%
  - Pacific Islander: 0%
  - Multiracial: 7.3%
  - Other: 5.5%
- ZIP code: 19121, 19122, 19123, 19130, 19133

Lower North Philadelphia is a section of Philadelphia, Pennsylvania, that is immediately north of Center City and below Upper North Philadelphia and can be described as a section of Philadelphia that was designated as a "Model City" target, that has overcome poverty and blight through key developments and a recipient of a federal funded program in 1966 to improve the neighborhood and extend the Center City district north of City Hall. It also contains the Lower North Philadelphia Speculative Housing Historic District along Cecil B. Moore Avenue.

Lower North Philadelphia consists of the Brewerytown, Cecil B. Moore, Cabot, Fairhill, Francisville, Hartranft, Ludlow, North Central, Poplar, Sharswood, Spring Garden, South Lehigh, Stanton, Strawberry Mansion, Yorktown, Fairmount and Northern Liberties neighborhoods.

== Demographics ==
The demographics of Lower North Philadelphia shows that the area has a population density of 14,736 people per mile with an average household size of 3 and 30% of households had children. There is an 18% annual residential turnover rate with 42% of residents staying for more than 5 years, with an average of 5 years of residency.
