= North Philadelphia =

Coordinates: 40.006762°N 75.142863°W

- Neighborhood of Philadelphia
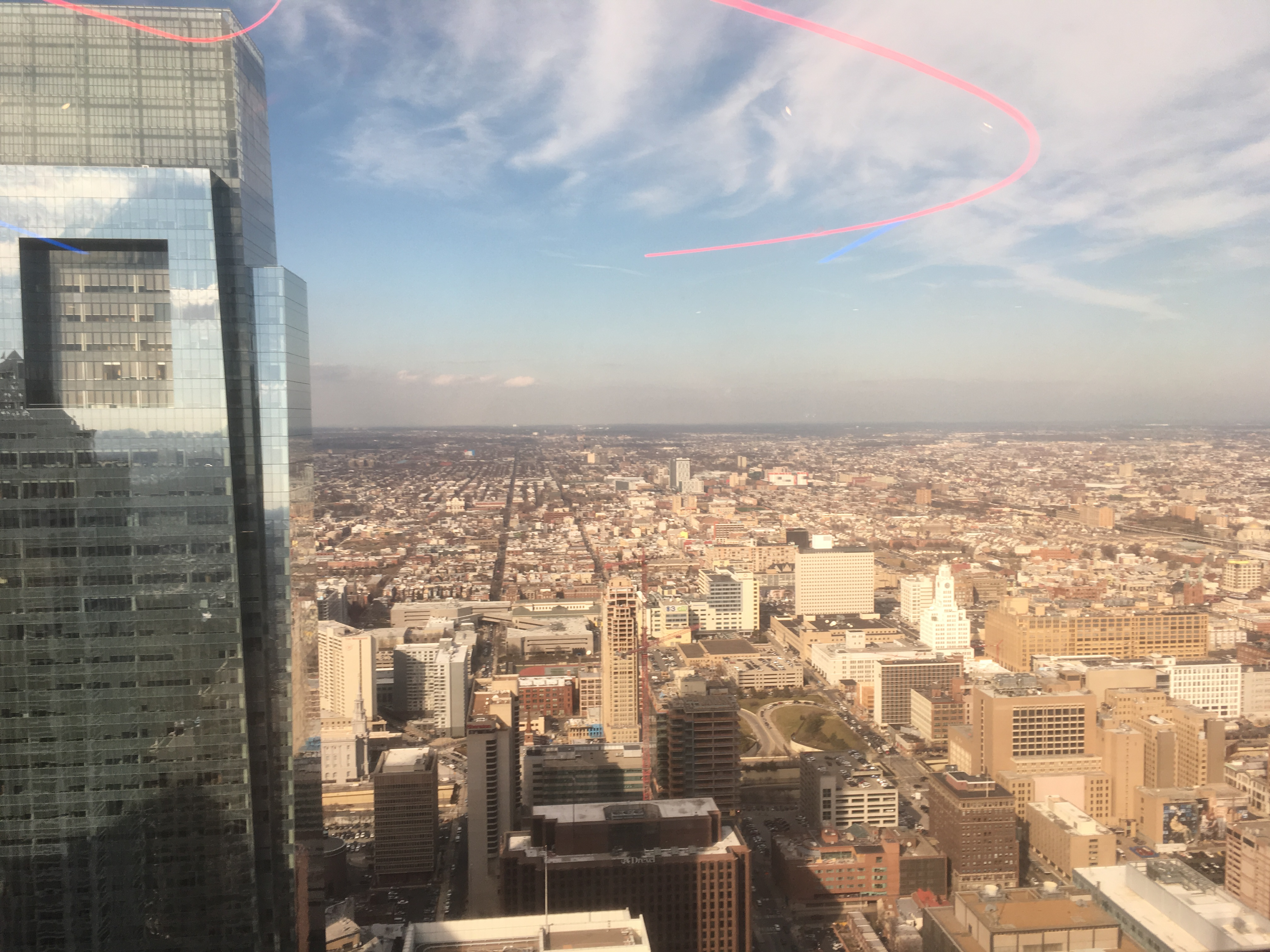
- North Philadelphia from One Liberty Observation Deck

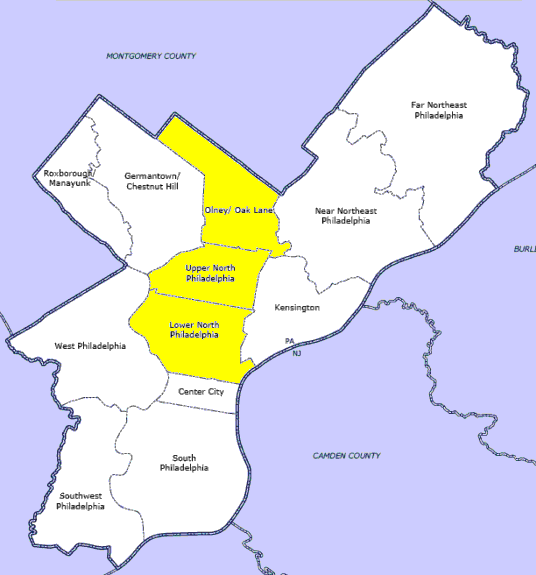
- Map of Philadelphia County with North Philadelphia highlighted. Click for larger image
- Country: United States of America
- State: Pennsylvania
- County: Philadelphia
- City: Philadelphia

Area
  - Total: 46.7 sq mi (121 km^{2})

Population (2010)
  - Total: 240,781
  - Density: 5,155/sq mi (1,990/km^{2})
- ZIP code: 19120, 19121, 19122, 19123, 19125, 19126, 19130, 19132, 19133, 19134, 19137, 19140 and 19141

North Philadelphia, nicknamed North Philly, is a section of Philadelphia, Pennsylvania. It is immediately north of Center City. Though the full extent of the region is somewhat vague, "North Philadelphia" is regarded as everything north of either Vine Street or Spring Garden Street, between Northwest Philadelphia and Northeast Philadelphia. It is bordered to the north by Olney Ave along Broad Street, Spring Garden Street to the south, 35th Street to the west and Adams Avenue to the east. The Philadelphia Police Department patrols five districts located within North Philadelphia: the 22nd, 25th, 26th, 35th and 39th districts. There are thirteen ZIP Codes for North Philadelphia: 19120, 19121, 19122, 19123, 19125, 19126, 19130, 19132, 19133, 19134, 19137, 19140 and 19141.

The city government views this sprawling chunk of Philadelphia more precisely as three smaller districts, drawn up by the Redevelopment Authority in 1964. These regions are (from north to south) Olney-Oak Lane, Upper North Philadelphia and Lower North Philadelphia. Other sections of North Philadelphia include Brewerytown, Fairhill, Fairmount, Francisville, Franklinville, Glenwood, Hartranft, Koreatown, Northern Liberties, Poplar (roughly bound by Girard Avenue, Broad Street, Spring Garden Street and 5th Street), Sharswood, Strawberry Mansion, and Yorktown.

== History ==
=== Early history ===
Prior to its incorporation into the city proper, North Philadelphia was little more than a collection of primarily agricultural townships north of the original City of Philadelphia. In the 18th century, as Philadelphia grew in importance and, consequently, population, then pastoral North Philadelphia became an attractive alternative to the burgeoning city. The mansions of wealthy Philadelphians began to dot the landscape, and by the late 18th and early 19th century, several small town centers had developed to anchor the growing population. However, this suburban landscape was to be interrupted around the middle of the 19th century, as rapid urban expansion led to The Consolidation Act of 1854. This state law annexed all of the townships within Philadelphia County to the City of Philadelphia. With new territory now under the aegis of Philadelphia's city planners, a rising influx of European immigrants led to the end of North as a suburb of Philadelphia. North Philadelphia's decentralized towns were gradually meshed into a sprawling network of the ubiquitous Philadelphia rowhouses. A number of the newly created neighborhoods retained the name of their ancestral towns and townships, for example, Northern Liberties was formerly Northern Liberties Township.

=== Industrial era ===
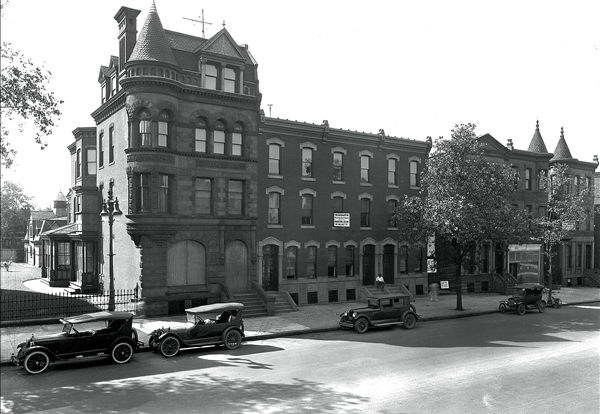
2600 Block of North Broad Street. Example of the late Victorian and Gothic stylizations of the German architects that designed buildings in North Philadelphia. Turrets like the one pictured still dot North Broad Street.

Philadelphia was one of the most important centers of manufacturing in the world between the mid-19th and mid-20th centuries, and North Philadelphia is one of the sections of the city whose landscape was most deeply shaped by the industrial era. Its landscape still strongly reflects this heritage.

As the industrial age peaked in America, North Philadelphia became a working man's town. Upper North Philadelphia, Olney, Brewerytown, became major hubs of production. Large factories and industrial complexes were erected, covering vast swaths of city land. Thousands of row homes were constructed to house the burgeoning worker population. This expansion was also the impetus for breaking ground on the Broad Street Line subway, designed specifically to carry a passenger from the northern hub of Olney to Philadelphia City Hall in under 20 minutes. Major freight and passenger rail lines were built to intersect at the newly constructed North Broad Street Station and transmit cargo from the bustling factories. The completion of the BSL these major railways made the region a thriving hub of transportation. For a time, North Philadelphia station became the second most heavily trafficked rail station in the city, and the Olney Ave station the most used subway stop.

Along with a number of Philadelphia's major manufacturing concerns came the nearby estates of the wealthy industrialists who had founded them. Lower North Philadelphia in particular housed a number of the nouveau riche: ambitious first or second generation immigrants or those that had made their fortunes starting manufacturing firms. Many were German Jews who had settled in the area, later founding companies and building synagogues. For a time, an age of opulence and grand architecture returned to North Philadelphia, centered on what is now zoned as the Historic North Broad Street Mansion and Speculative Housing Districts. Gentlemen's clubs, upscale restaurants and shopping districts grew in this southern tier for a brief moment in history, peaking in the late 1920s. Upper-class foremen and executives lived farther north along Broad Street, in what is now the West Diamond Street Townhouse Historic District. Thriving commercial districts sprung up along the great northern avenues: Columbia (renamed Cecil B. Moore Avenue), Susquehanna, Dauphin, Erie, Lehigh and Olney, to name a few. However, just as this wealth was so suddenly gained, it would just as suddenly be lost. The new money culture proved to be an unstable foundation for a lasting community, and like so many constructs of the Gilded Age, this core of wealth was doomed to rot.

=== Post-industrial economic decline ===
Over the next few decades The Great Depression, outsourcing and white flight took their toll on North Philadelphia in a fashion similar to other major US cities of the mid to late 20th century, if not in a more pronounced fashion. While residential corridors like Hope Street and Delhi Street had long housed primarily African-American residents, white residents moved out of the city as waves of poorer black residents moved in. During the 40s and 50s, much of the area was racially integrated, although smaller streets were usually completely black or white. Whites began to move out slowly at first in the late 1940s as these residents became more affluent and Northeast Philadelphia began to develop new housing with lawns and conveniences such as modern plumbing. In most cases African Americans moved into the vacant houses and as this began to increase, true white flight began. Increasingly, people moved out of North Philadelphia not solely to move into newer homes, but to avoid facing decreasing property values and increased criminality. For a time, Lower North Philadelphia became a great center of black culture and music, most notably jazz. A number of commercial corridors were maintained for decades, and multiple musicians came to North Philadelphia, like John Coltrane and Stan Getz. By 1964, North Philadelphia was the city's center of African American culture, home to 400,000 of the city's 600,000 black residents.

As the century marched past middle age, other problems symptomatic of all US cities of the time came about. Some of the neighborhoods in North Philadelphia sprung up around one monolithic factory, which was the center of the community's income. Each factory that closed down devastated its host neighborhood. In this way, the wave of national industrial collapse caused the rapid break up of numerous "factory neighborhoods" in the predominantly working class North Philadelphia.

==== 1964 Columbia Avenue Riot ====
On the evening of August 28, 1964, a black woman named Odessa Bradford got into an argument with two police officers, one black, Robert Wells, and the other white, John Hoff, after her car stalled at 23rd Street and Columbia Avenue. After Bradford refused to comply with the two officers' orders to move the car, because the car had stalled, and she was unable to drive it, an argument ensued. The officers then tried to physically remove Bradford from the car. She resisted and a large crowd assembled in the area. A man tried to come to Bradford's aid by attacking the police officers at the scene, but he and Bradford were arrested. Rumors then spread throughout North Philadelphia that a pregnant black woman had been beaten to death by white police officers. Later that evening, and throughout the next two days, angry mobs looted and burned mostly white-owned businesses in North Philadelphia, mainly along Columbia Avenue. Outnumbered, the police response was to withdraw from the area rather than aggressively confront the rioters. The race riots of 1964 became iconic for the rising ethnic tensions in the region, and the continued withdrawal of white residents. The riot, which virtually destroyed the central shopping district of North Philadelphia, signaled the beginning of the end for the North's commercial sector. The withering of the American manufacturing sector led to the closing of a number of the factories that multiple northern neighborhoods were centered on and depended on. Increased urban blight and the general decline of Philadelphia in the late 20th century even saw the decline of multiple black communities in North Philadelphia. The legendary Connie Mack Stadium was closed in favor of the new Pattison Sports Complex. North Philadelphia Station lost Amtrak Service, and the BSL subway line garnered a reputation for violent crime and rape. The art deco office buildings and government institutions were mostly abandoned, as were the mansions of the ruined industrialists. As in multiple poorer African American city ghettos, drug addiction became a major blight in North Philadelphia, further destabilizing families and social networks.

== North Philadelphia today ==
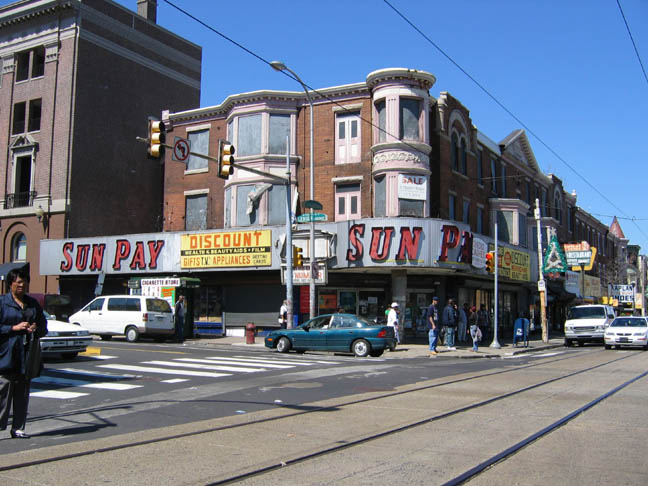
Commercial District of Germantown and Lehigh Avenue, in the Hartranft neighborhood of North Philadelphia

=== Neighborhoods ===
North Philadelphia, like other sections of Philadelphia, is racially and socially segregated block by block. A noticeable pattern in the area is that, in the southern part of North Philadelphia (south of about Erie Avenue), Germantown Avenue (which later becomes North 6th Street) is the dividing point between the areas that are predominantly Black (to the west), and the areas that are predominantly Hispanic (to the east). However, this is slowly changing, with a small yet growing population of Hispanics living west of Germantown Avenue, and already significant population of Blacks living east of that street.

The area between Broad Street and 5th Street is increasingly becoming a "transition zone" between the larger predominantly black area west of Broad, and the smaller predominantly Hispanic area east of 5th. This section of Philadelphia has nearly equal populations of Hispanics and Blacks, although Germantown Avenue is still seen as a divider street, with areas between Germantown Avenue and Broad Street "more black" and areas between Germantown Avenue and 5th street "more Hispanic".

East of Front street, blocks start to get more diverse, with significant populations of Hispanics, blacks and whites. Also, as the Hispanic community continues to grow eastward, the ethnic white enclaves of eastern North Philadelphia continue to shrink.

See

North Philadelphia is usually described as an area north of Center City, between Front Street and Fairmount Park.

Sub-sections include:

- Lower North Philadelphia - Spring Garden Street to the south and Dauphin Street to the north
- Upper North Philadelphia - Dauphin Street to the south and Wyoming Avenue to the north

=== Blight and Brownfields ===
Today, remnants of these more prosperous eras remain. However, multiple historic buildings have collapsed, either from neglect or demolition, and thousands more still lie abandoned. A handful have become protected historic properties, and 67 properties and districts were added to the National Register of Historic Places. Several blocks, with multiple old mansions, have been re-zoned as the aforementioned historic districts. A number of churches were built over the years, as well. Some still stand, but all too often money is scarce to preserve their deteriorating architecture. The trolley lines that once criss-crossed the northern streets and linked the region with the rest of Philadelphia were shut down by SEPTA in 1992. Immense, abandoned factories sit idle; warehouses lie empty; and disused heavy rail lines scar the landscape. The names of the old industrialists, such as Gratz, Poth, Uber, Bouvier and Schmidt, still adorn multiple buildings and street signs in the area but are otherwise foreign to a number of modern-day residents.

The Neighborhood Transformation Initiative or NTI, was a City program launched by Mayor John F. Street. The program called for the demolition of thousands of condemned buildings and the construction of large-scale, medium-density public housing, with restoration efforts to be employed on salvageable houses. Multiple blocks of old rowhouses have been bulldozed and replaced with suburban-style tract houses. This program has radically changed some sections of North Philadelphia. Some charge that little effort was made to save a number of historic buildings, others that NTI was needed to change blighted neighborhoods. The lasting effects of the program remain to be seen.

=== Notable people ===
- Blue Magic
- Tierra Whack
- Cecil B. Moore
- Jaguar Wright
- Billy Paul
- Rasheed Wallace
- Teddy Pendergrass
- Lil Uzi Vert
- Bernard Hopkins
- M. K. Asante
- Blanche Calloway
- Cassidy
- John Coltrane
- Bill Cosby
- Freeway
- Young Gunz
- Vivian Green
- Kevin Hart
- Meek Mill
- Lee Morgan
- Ursula Rucker
- Jill Scott
- Monnette Sudler
- Walter E. Williams
- Maalik Wayns
- Kyle Lowry
- Danny Garcia
- Eddie Alvarez
- Gabriel Rosado (boxer)
- Pedro "Peedi Crakk" Zayas - rapper
- Kahleah Copper
- Alex Karp - co-founder Palantir
- Skrilla- Rapper

=== Redevelopment and gentrification ===
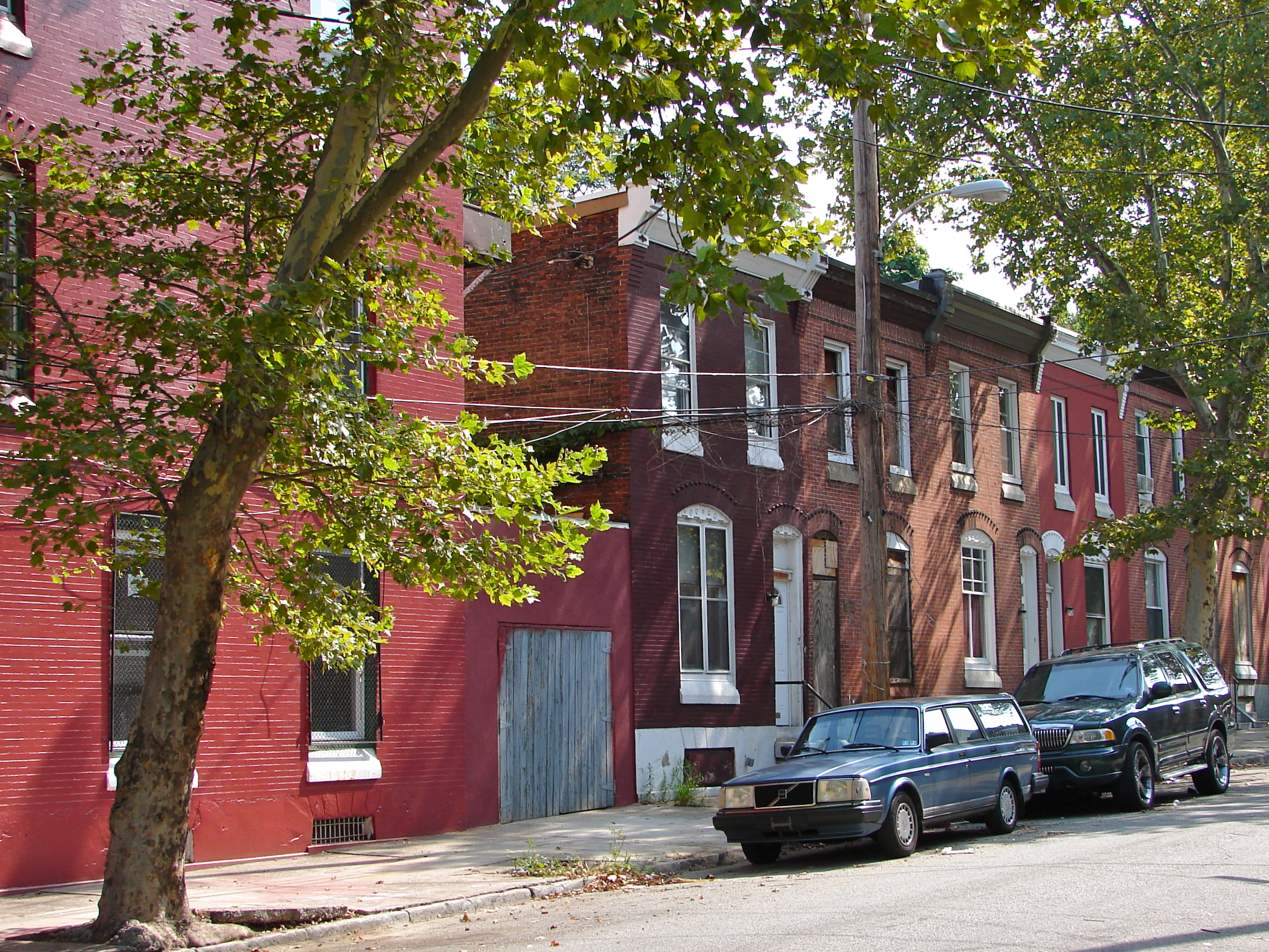
Brewerytown Historic District in North Philadelphia.

Some areas, like Olney, Allegheny and Erie, still have relatively active communities, but even they are often troubled by drugs, crime and/or social underfunding. Allegheny West has advanced, mostly from the support of some of the last industries in North Philadelphia, such as Pep Boys, which is headquartered in the neighborhood.

Several parts of North Philadelphia, especially those that border the Center City district, have recently been experiencing varying levels of gentrification. Once economically divested neighborhoods like Brewerytown, Francisville, Northern Liberties, Poplar and West Kensington have seen large scale development break ground. Other regions have seen virtually no change, save the rising housing values that have accompanied increased attention in urban markets. A number of residents of communities in North Philadelphia have voiced resistance towards these gentrifying forces, viewing the sudden investment as an invasion that threatens the traditional character of the neighborhoods.

== Demographics ==
According to the 2010 census, 340,350 people live among the ZIP codes of 19132, 19133, 19121, 19122, 19130 and 19123. (Map)

=== Racial demographics ===
- Non-Hispanic Black: 169,494 (49.8%)
- Hispanic or Latino of any race: 103,806 (30.5%)
- Non-Hispanic White: 34,375 (10.1%)
- Asian & Pacific Islander: 17,017 (5.0%)
- Mixed or Other: 14,635 (4.3%)
- Native American: 1,021 (0.3%)

Most of North Philadelphia's population is made up of African Americans and Puerto Ricans. The eastern half of North Philadelphia has one of the highest concentrations of Puerto Ricans in the country, this section of North Philadelphia is over 75% Puerto Rican, and over half of Philadelphia's Puerto Rican population resides in this section of the city. North Philadelphia also has a high concentration of Black Muslims. The area also has significant Irish and other White Americans, Dominican, Haitian, Cuban, Korean and Polish populations, among others. About half of the population lives below the poverty line.

== Crime ==
Most of Philadelphia's crime pertains to the drug trade. In a 2007 Philadelphia Weekly article journalist Steve Volk states that anti-drug activists said that North Philadelphia has a lot of open air recreational drug dealing because the act is a tradition and because multiple areas have consistent poverty. Though several blighted Philadelphia neighborhoods are known for open-air drug dealing, as well as open-air drug using, the "North Philly Badlands" is notorious nationwide for it. A number of North Philadelphia neighborhoods are blighted, and abound in abandoned homes and vacant lots.

== Economy ==
Pep Boys is headquartered in North Philadelphia.

Certain sections of North Philadelphia were highly commercial. TOPPS Cards were once produced in North Philadelphia until moving to New York.

Temple University is the seventh largest employer in the City of Philadelphia, Temple University Hospital, Inc is number 11 (PA Dept of Labor and Industry, 1st Quarter 2019).

== Transportation ==
Notably, Broad Street roughly bisects North Philadelphia north-south. Broad Street is a six-lane arterial street that is designated as Pennsylvania Route 611. The Broad Street Line or 'Orange Line,' runs along Broad Street, directly connecting North Philadelphia with Center City and South Philadelphia, as well as with the rest of Philadelphia's public transit system: SEPTA.

As of 2017, Taiwanese airline China Airlines provides a private bus service to and from John F. Kennedy International Airport in New York City for customers based in the Philadelphia area. This service stops in North Philadelphia.

== Education ==
=== Public education ===
Public and Charter schooling in North Philadelphia is handled by the School District of Philadelphia. The region is divided into several "clusters," which administer individual schools. By region, these clusters are:

Lower North Philadelphia

- William Penn (William Penn High School closed in June 2010)
- Strawberry Mansion
- Murrell Dobbins C.T.E.
- A. Philip Randolph C.T.E.
- Franklin (current closed for asbestos removal)
- Masterman
- Roberts Vaux (now a Big Picture Charter School)

Upper North Philadelphia

- Gratz (now a Mastery Charter School)
- Edison

Olney/Oak Lane

- King
- Olney
- Central
- Philadelphia High School for Girls ("Girls High")

YouthBuild Philadelphia Charter School, which is chartered by the School District of Philadelphia, is also located in North Philadelphia, just south of William Penn High School.

The Mastery Charter Schools system operates the Clymer School in North Philadelphia. The system opened the Mastery Charter Lenfest Campus (7–12) in September 2001 in an office building in North Philadelphia. The school moved to Old City in Center City in 2002.

North Philadelphia has the largest concentration of Charter Schools in Philadelphia

=== Post-secondary education ===
North Philadelphia hosts a number of institutions of higher learning.

- La Salle University
- Community College of Philadelphia
- Messiah College, Philadelphia Campus
- Temple University
- Harcum College at Congreso.

=== Libraries ===
There are thirteen branch libraries of the Philadelphia Free Library located in North Philadelphia.

=== Museums and cultural sites ===
- Church of the Advocate
- Philadelphia Doll Museum
- Wagner Free Institute of Science
- The Blue Horizon - closed
- The Village of Arts and Humanities
- New Freedom Theatre

Uptown Theater is regarded as an important part of North Philadelphia history for its support of Black musicians during the 1950's. It was listed as on the National Register of Historic Places in 1982.

== See also ==
- List of Philadelphia neighborhoods
- History of the Puerto Ricans in Philadelphia
