= Upper North Philadelphia =

Coordinates: 39.98552°N 75.16358°W

- Neighborhood of Philadelphia
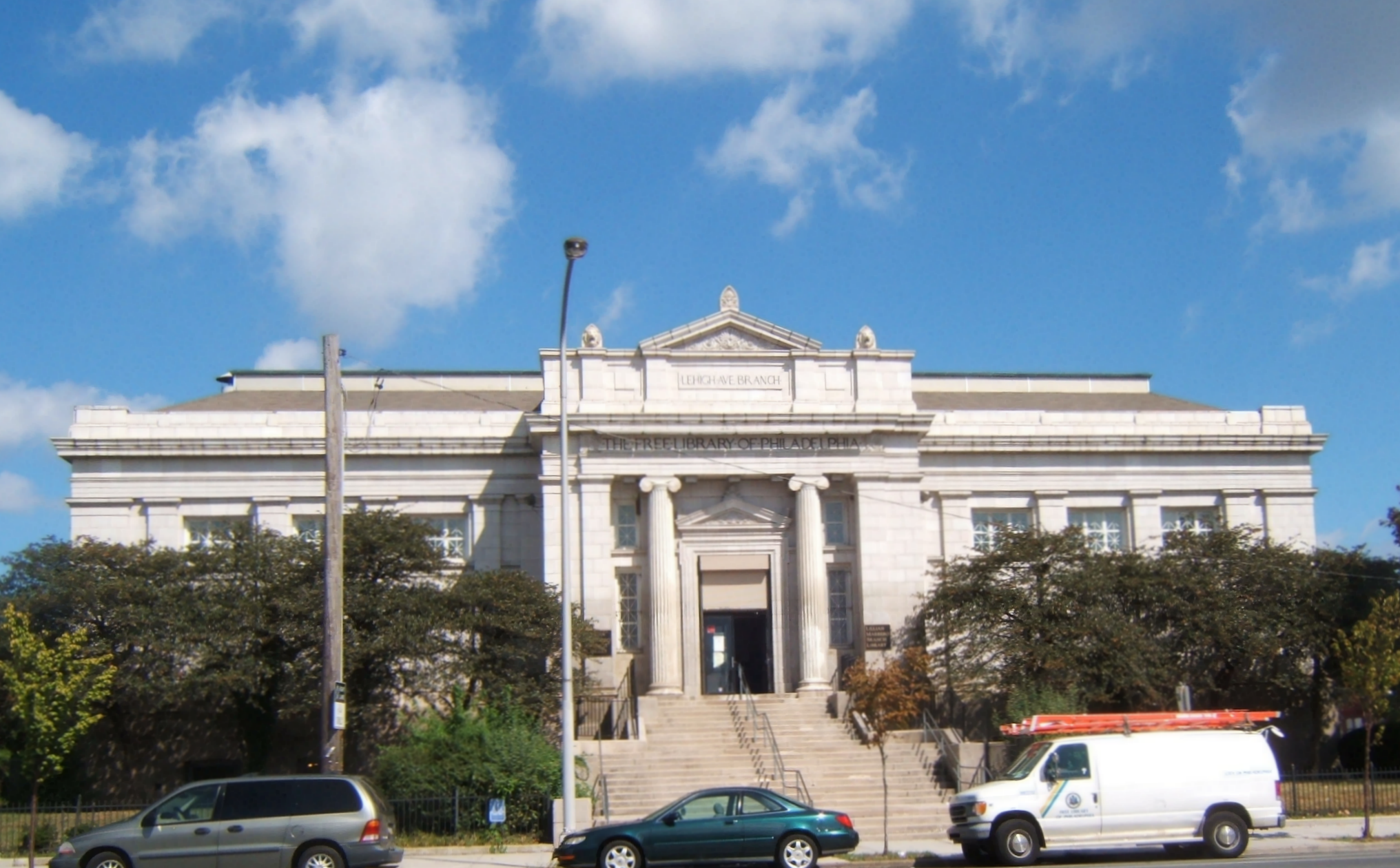
- Lillian Marrero Branch of the Philadelphia Free Library is located in Upper North Philadelphia's West Kensington

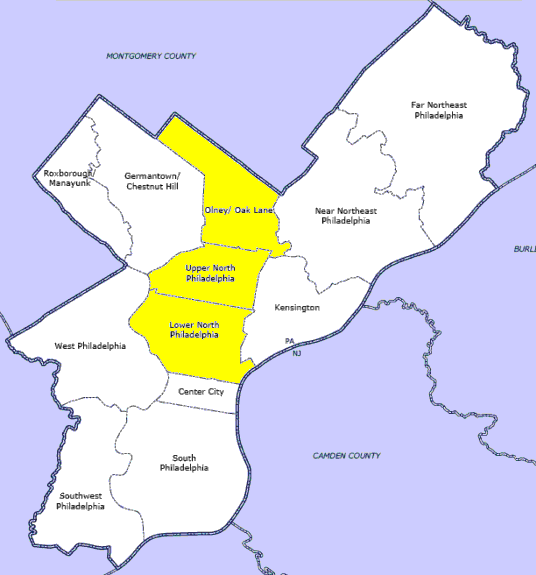
- Map of Philadelphia County with North Philadelphia highlighted. Click for larger image
- Country: United States of America
- State: Pennsylvania
- County: Philadelphia
- City: Philadelphia

Area
  - Total: 44.4 sq mi (115 km^{2})

Population (2010)
  - Total: 181,531
  - Density: 12,241/sq mi (4,726/km^{2})
- ZIP code: 19122, 19132, 19133, 19134, 19140

Upper North Philadelphia is a section of Philadelphia that is immediately north of Lower North Philadelphia, and can be described as an area that has a "...large and rapidly growing Puerto Rican population".

According to the planning commission, Upper North Philadelphia officially consists of the Allegheny West, Fairhill, Franklinville, Glenwood, Hunting Park, and Nicetown-Tioga neighborhoods. Bounded by York Street to the south, Front Street to the east, Roosevelt Expressway to the north, and Ridge Avenue to the west.

== Demographics ==
The demographics of Upper North Philadelphia shows that the area has a population density of 12,241 people per mile with an average household size of 3 and 37% of households had children. There is a 17% annual residential turnover rate with 47% of residents staying for more than 5 years, with an average of 6 years of residency. The majority of residents are African Americans and Puerto Ricans.

=== Racial demographics ===
Sources:

- Non-Hispanic Black: 106,559 (58.7%)
- Hispanic or Latino of any race: 62,083 (34.2%)
- Mixed or Other: 4,901 (2.7%)
- Non-Hispanic White: 3,994 (2.2%)
- Asian: 3,990 (2.2%)
