= Northern National Bank =

- U.S. National Register of Historic Places
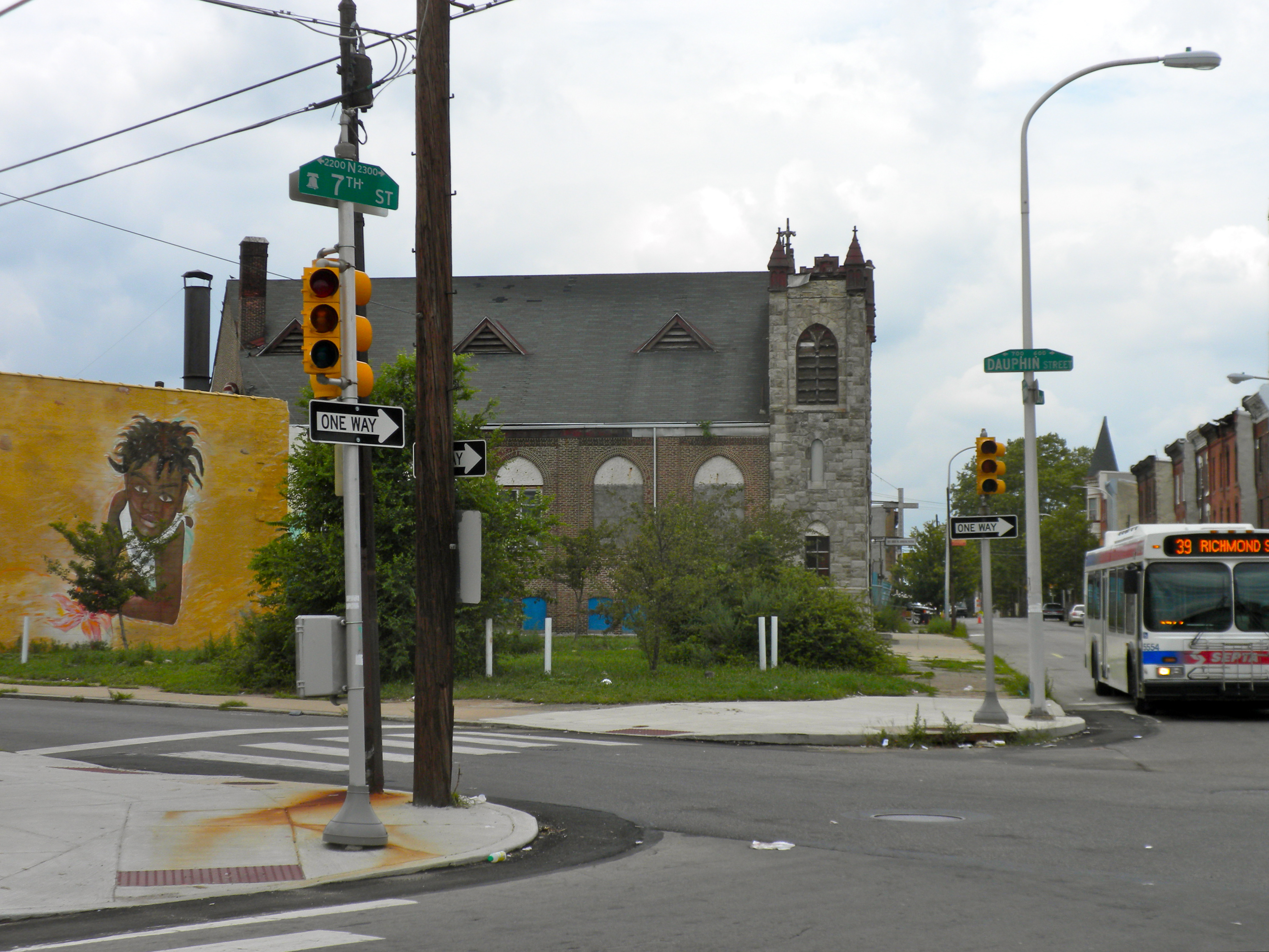
- Site of Northern National Bank, August 2010

- Location within Philadelphia Location within Pennsylvania Location within the United States
- Location: 2300 Germantown Ave., Philadelphia, Pennsylvania
- Coordinates: 39°59′12″N 75°8′46″W
- Area: less than one acre
- Built: 1893
- Architect: Smedley, Walter D.
- Architectural style: Romanesque
- NRHP reference No.: 85001388
- Added to NRHP: June 27, 1985

Northern National Bank was a historic bank building located in the Hartranft neighborhood of Philadelphia, Pennsylvania. It was built in 1893, and was a two-story, brick and stone flatiron building in the Romanesque. It featured terra cotta and pressed metal decorative elements, and a set of pink granite steps at the main entrance. It has been demolished.

It was added to the National Register of Historic Places in 1985.
