= Glenwood, Philadelphia =

Glenwood
- Neighborhood of Philadelphia
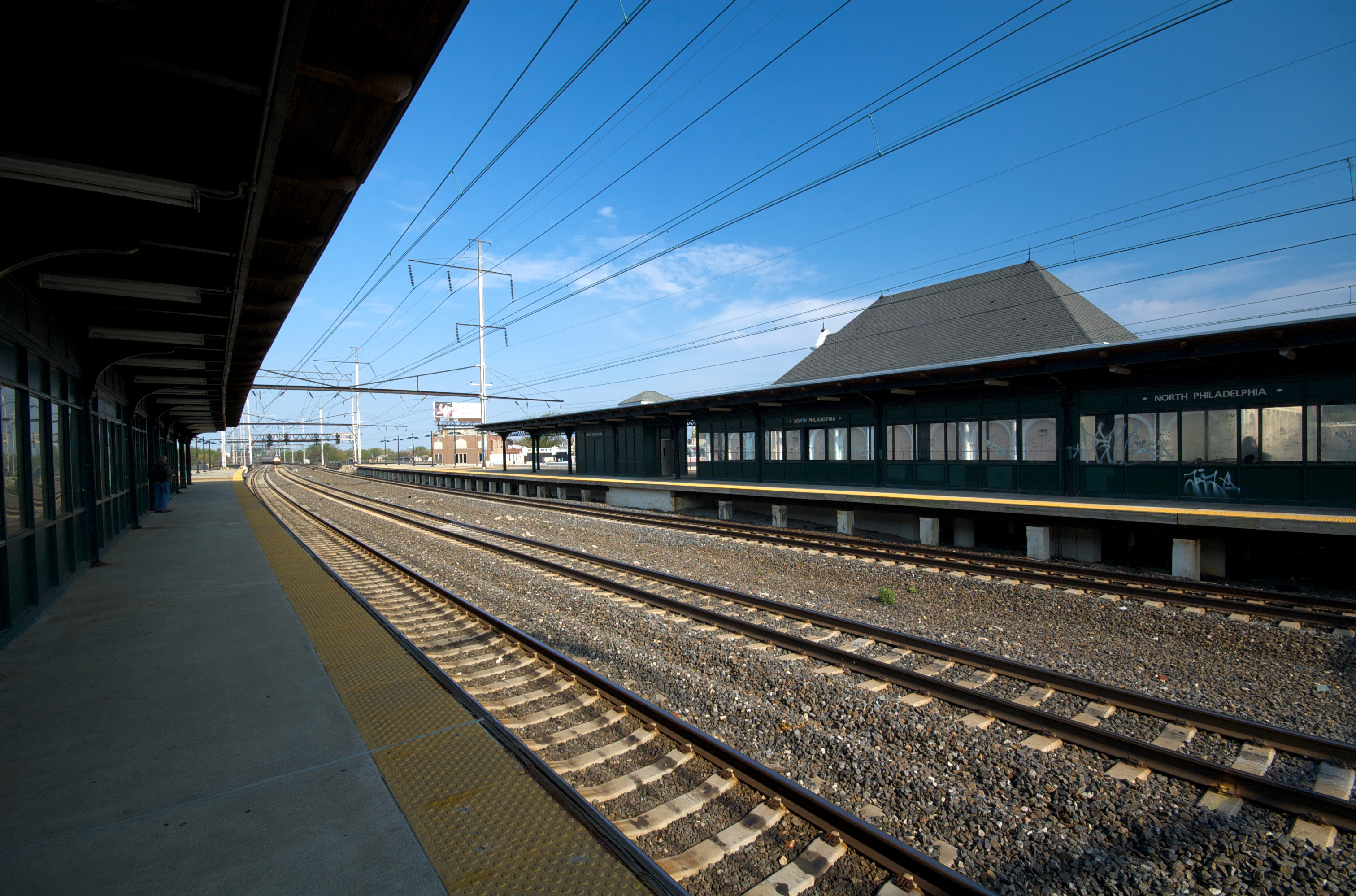
- SEPTA's North Philadelphia station is located in Glenwood

- Location within Philadelphia
- Country: United States
- State: Pennsylvania
- County: Philadelphia
- City: Philadelphia
- Area codes: 215, 267, and 445

Glenwood is a neighborhood in North Philadelphia, Pennsylvania, United States. It is located in the vicinity of North Philadelphia Station to West York Street.

In 1988, two residents of the 3100 block of Percy Street, Reverend Clarence Hester, a Baptist minister and activist, and Carrie Hartsfield, an insurance worker who retired, cofounded the Glenwood Community Development Corporation in an effort to improve the area. Glenwood is often defined as the area bounded by York Street to the south (bordering Stanton and Templetown), Germantown Avenue to the east (bordering Fairhill), and Glenwood Avenue to the north and west (bordering Nicetown–Tioga, Allegheny West, and Strawberry Mansion). Glenwood is a low-income, predominantly African-American neighborhood. The area has one of the highest crime rates in the city.

== Demographics ==
As of the 2010 Census, Glenwood was 88% non-Hispanic black or African American, 7.8% Hispanic or Latino of any race, 2% white, 1% Asian, and 1.3% all other. Though a predominantly black neighborhood, there is an increasingly significant number of Hispanics, particularly in the eastern parts of the neighborhood, in areas immediately west of Germantown Avenue.

== Crime ==
The crack cocaine epidemic of the 1980s changed the character of the neighborhood; it was considered to be the western fringes of the Philadelphia Badlands, an area known for an abundance of open-air recreational drug markets and drug-related violence. Hester said that when recreational drugs appeared in his area, many residents left, and drug dealers moved in to their now-vacant houses. Hester began campaigning against drug dealers in the area, persuading Philadelphia Mayor W. Wilson Goode to order the demolition of 82 properties at the intersection of Hutchinson Street and Percy Street. Frank Rubino of the Philadelphia Weekly stated in a 2007 article that Glenwood had "crumbling, boarded-up" row houses with signs reading "KEEP OUT!", broken windows, much trash, porches with iron grating, graffiti, murals erected for people who died, discarded malt liquor bottles and tires, and stray cats.
