= French International School of Philadelphia =

School in Pennsylvania, United States

Coordinates: 40.00197°N 75.23866°W

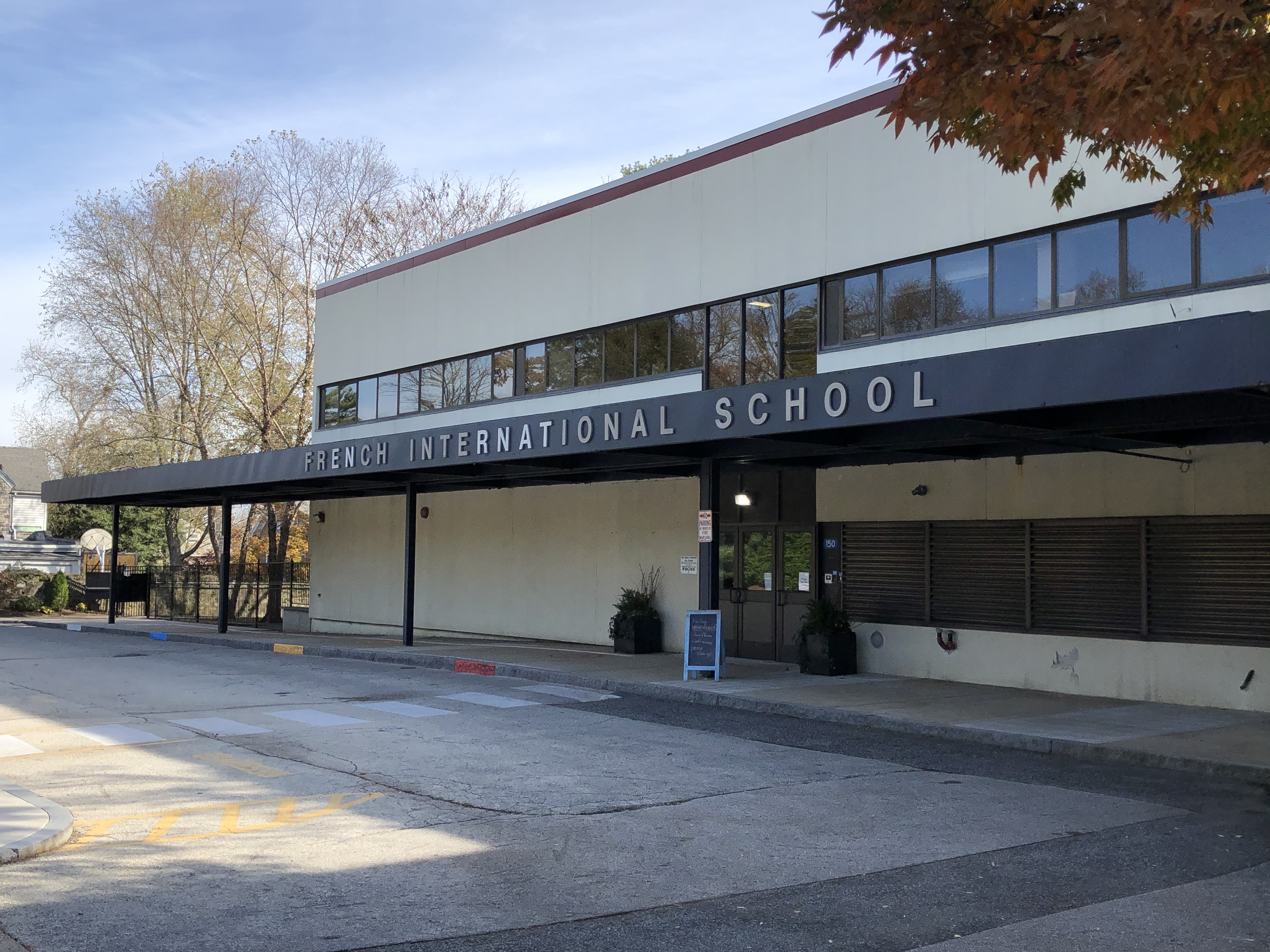
French International School

The French International School of Philadelphia (French: École française internationale de Philadelphie, EFIP) is a French international school in Bala Cynwyd, Lower Merion Township, Pennsylvania within the Philadelphia metropolitan area. As of 1993 it is the only full French bilingual educational program in Pennsylvania. It serves grades PreK-8. The French International School of Philadelphia is accredited both by the French Ministry of Education and the Middle States Association of Colleges and Schools.

== History ==
The school established its bylaws on January 22, 1991, and it opened in September of that year. At the time the school was established, the French expatriate population of Philadelphia was increasing. At the time, 47 French companies had operations in the Philadelphia area. The Philadelphia honorary consul for France, Stanhope S. Browne, and the general consul of France, Jean-Yves Defay, stated that they estimated that between 5,000 and 6,000 French people lived in the Philadelphia area. In addition some American families had concerns about education in American schools. The French expats worked with locals for five months to have the school established.

Originally the school occupied a leased second floor wing of the Baldwin School in Bryn Mawr. There were 13 students, with the oldest at 7 years and the youngest at 2 1/2 years. Because younger children can more easily learn languages, the school initially opened with only the maternelle grades. The school's principal, Josette J. Smith, stated in 1991 that "A private-school education in France is probably much more conservative than education in public schools. And our school is a private school, but it is modeled on public education in France."

The school planned to add the third grade in September 1992. Because the first facility was unable to give more space, the school moved into a facility of the Shipley School, the just-vacated Beechwood house, in 1993.

The school eventually moved to Bala Cynwyd, PA, and established an Upper School in a repurposed office building on City Avenue to house grades 4-8 and a Lower School, located on Highland Avenue, to house pre-K3 to 4th grades.

== Student body ==
As of 2014 the school has 320 students, with about 33% being French, 33% being American, and 33% from international and/or bilingual families. In 1992 Josette Smith stated that many students were children of French business executives assigned to work in the Philadelphia area.

== See also ==
- American School of Paris - An American international school in France
