= Brewerytown, Philadelphia =

Neighborhood of Philadelphia, Pennsylvania

- Brewerytown Historic District
- U.S. National Register of Historic Places
- U.S. Historic district
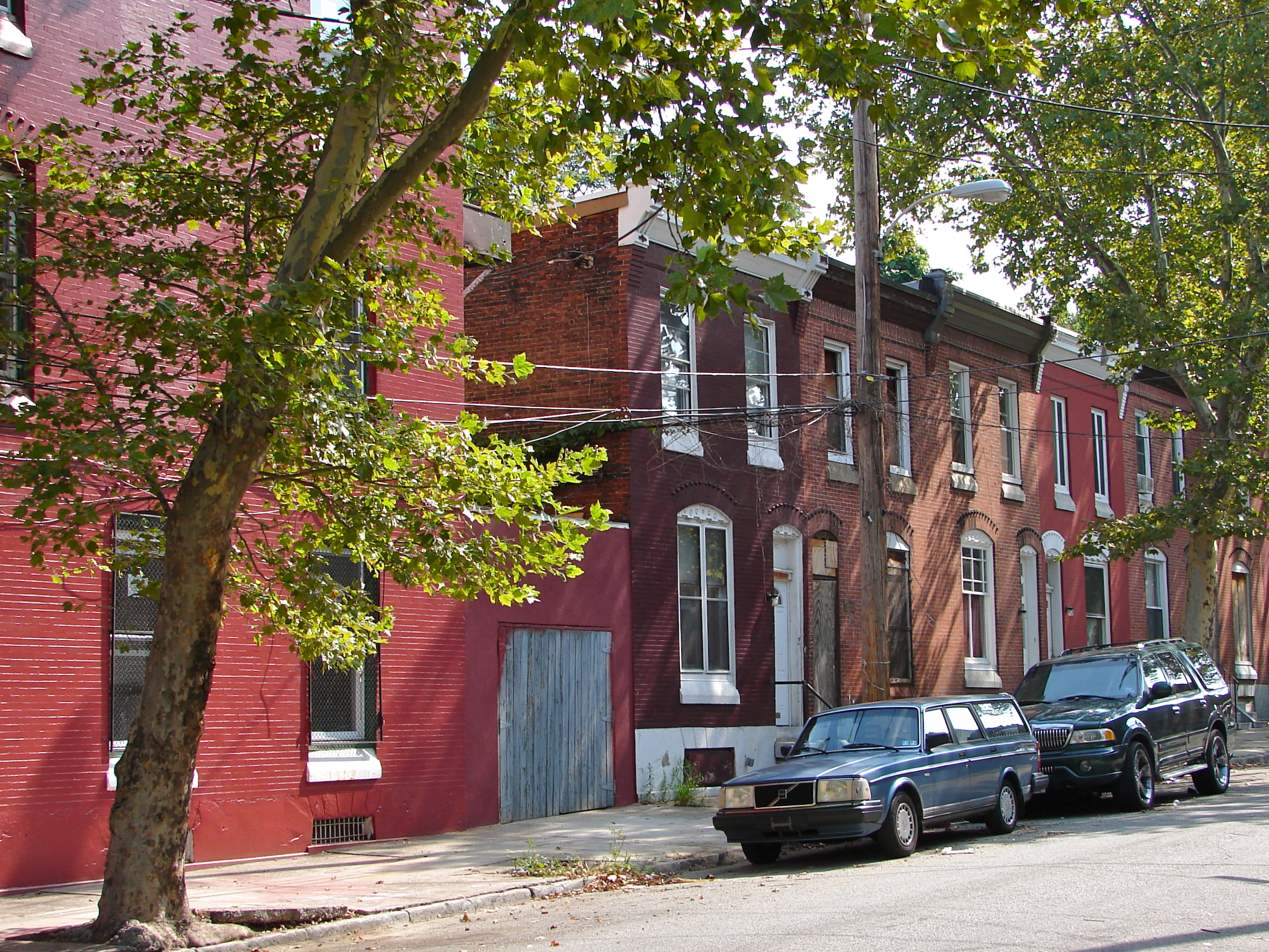

- Location within Philadelphia Location within Pennsylvania Location within the United States
- Location: Roughly bounded by Cecil B Moore Ave., Poplar St., 25th. and N. 33rd Philadelphia, Pennsylvania
- Coordinates: 39°58′34″N 75°11′12″W
- Area: 34.8 acres (14.1 ha)
- Architect: William Decker
- Architectural style: Queen Anne, Romanesque
- NRHP reference No.: 91000096
- Added to NRHP: March 1, 1991

Brewerytown is a neighborhood in the North Philadelphia section of Philadelphia, Pennsylvania, United States. An unofficial region, Brewerytown runs approximately between the Schuylkill River's eastern bank and 25th Street, bounded by Montgomery Avenue to the north and Parrish Street to the south. Brewerytown derived its name from the numerous breweries that were located along the Schuylkill during the late 19th century and early 20th century. It is now primarily a residential neighborhood, with a growing and active commercial sector along Girard Avenue.

== History ==
The earliest indications of the beer-brewery legacy in this neighborhood can be seen on maps from the 1860s, which list several minor German brewers and distillation facilities in this region. Proximity to the river and nearby farmland allowed these establishments to flourish, and as demands increased, so did development in Brewerytown. By the early 20th century it was a thriving German settlement. Much of the expansion into the early 20th century was handled by architect Otto Wolf, who oversaw the construction of over 60 buildings in the area, bringing a distinct German texture to the houses, saloons, and breweries of the area. Some of his buildings are still standing, including the Bergdoll Brewing complex, and F.A. Poth Brewing. Jefferson Street Grounds, the first home of the Philadelphia Athletics major league baseball team and site of the first ever Major League Baseball game, is located at 27th and Jefferson Streets in the neighborhood. It was also home to famed Columbia Park.

At its peak, 700 breweries operated across Philadelphia, several in a ten-block area of Brewerytown. With the collapse of local industry later in the 20th century, originally started by the implementation of Prohibition in the United States, and later beer production moving primarily to the Midwest, no brewer was operating in that neighborhood by 1987. The industry has slowly returned to the city, but at far below the capacity of its heyday. As of 2025, there are no active breweries operating in Brewerytown. During this late 20th-century slump, the entirety of North Philadelphia, Brewerytown included, was hit hard by economic depressions. Much of the area was deemed blighted by the city government. In 1991, the Brewerytown Historic District was certified by the National Register of Historic Places. The district contains 380 buildings and is roughly bounded by Cecil B Moore Ave., Pennsylvania Ave., 25th. and N. 33rd.

=== Breweries ===
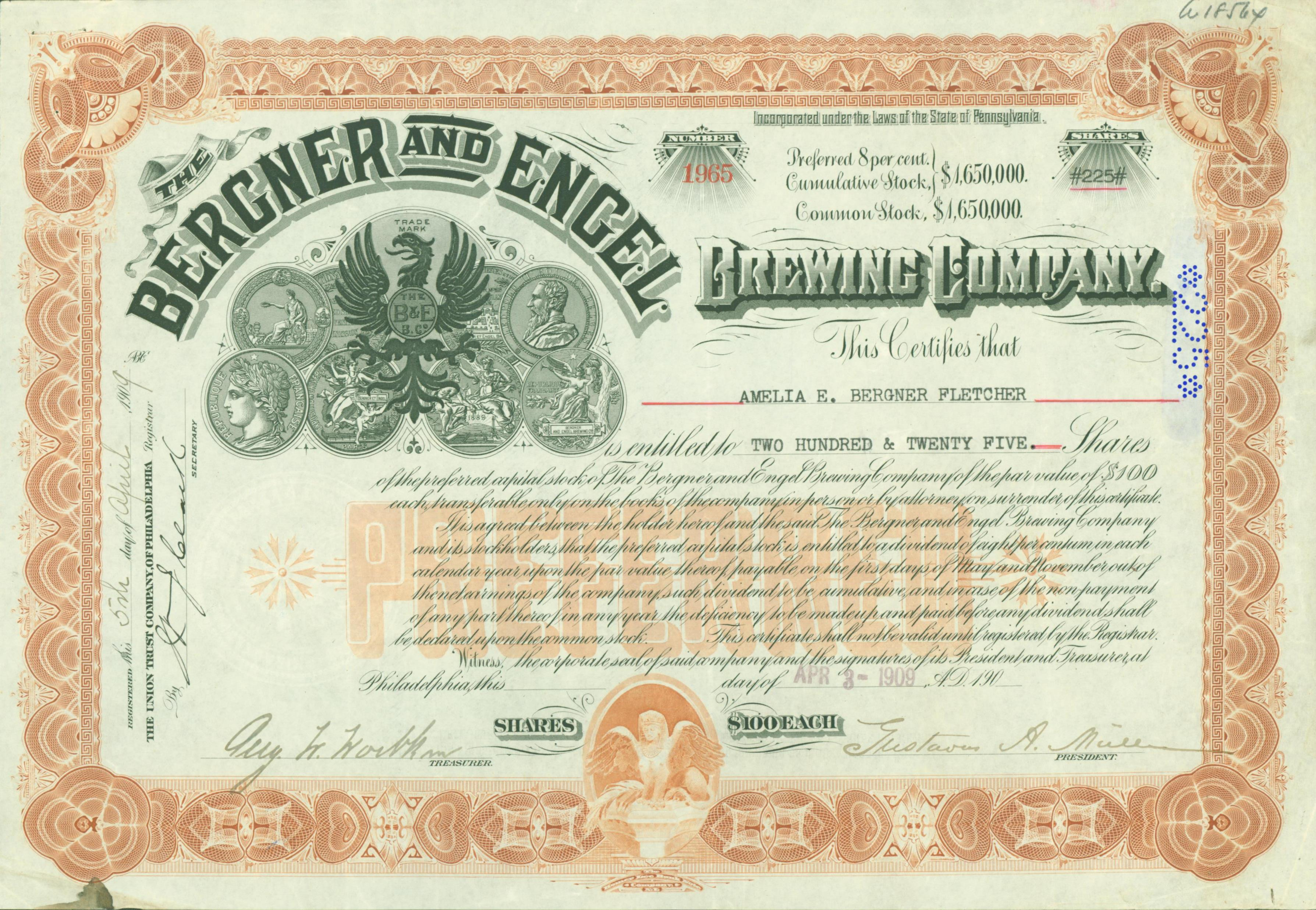
Share of the Bergner and Engel Brewing Company, issued 8 April 1909

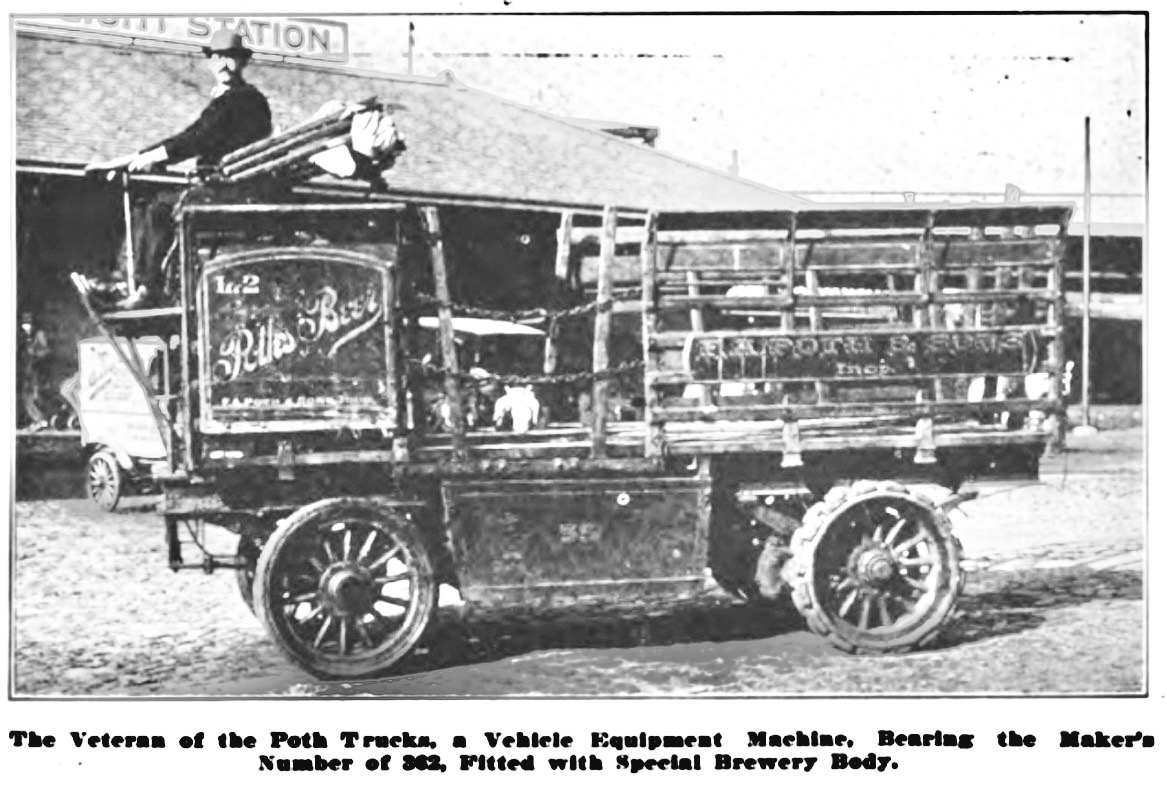
F. A. Poth & Sons using a Vehicle Equipment Company Truck (1900-1906)

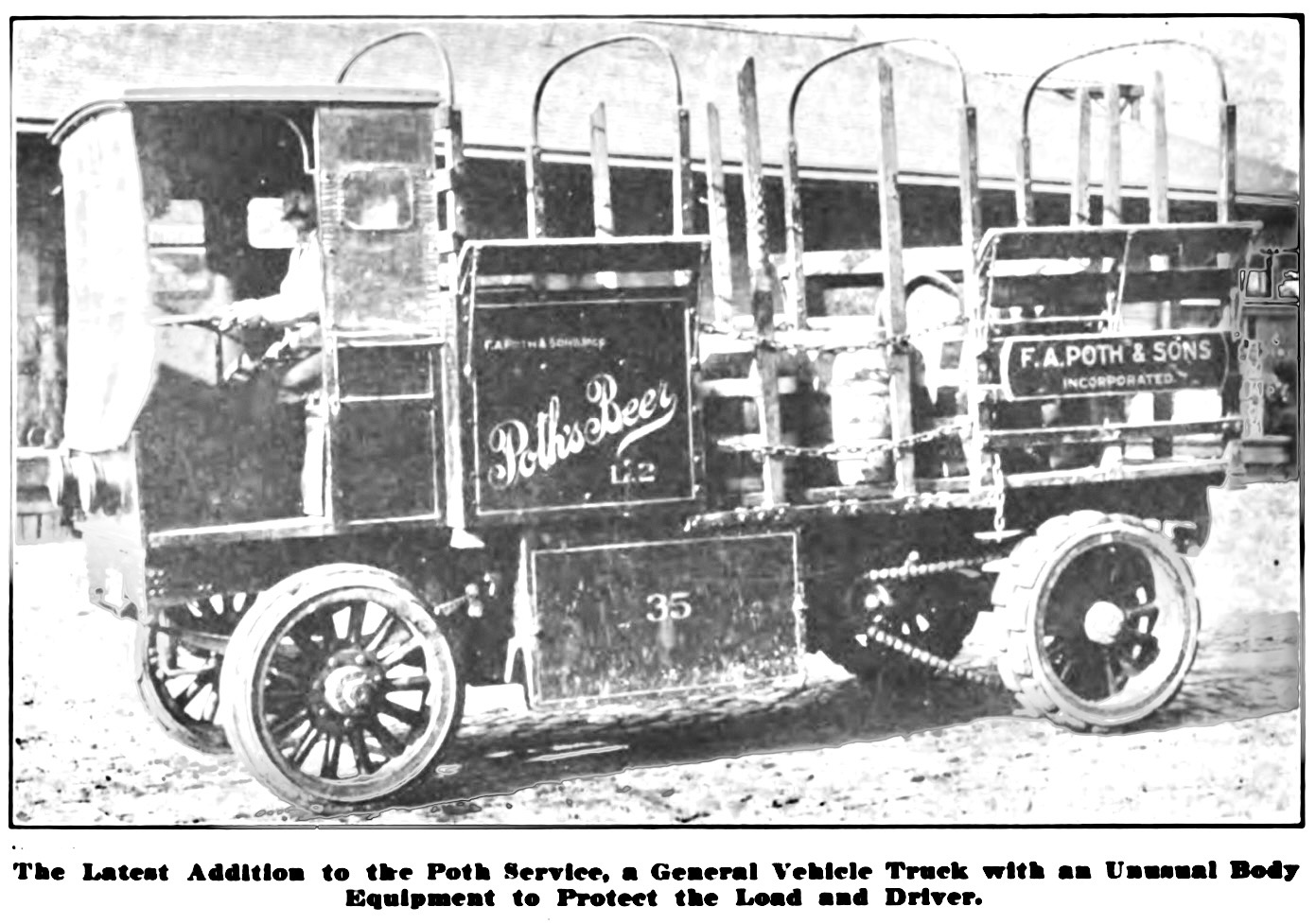
F. A. Poth & Sons using a G.V. Truck (1912)

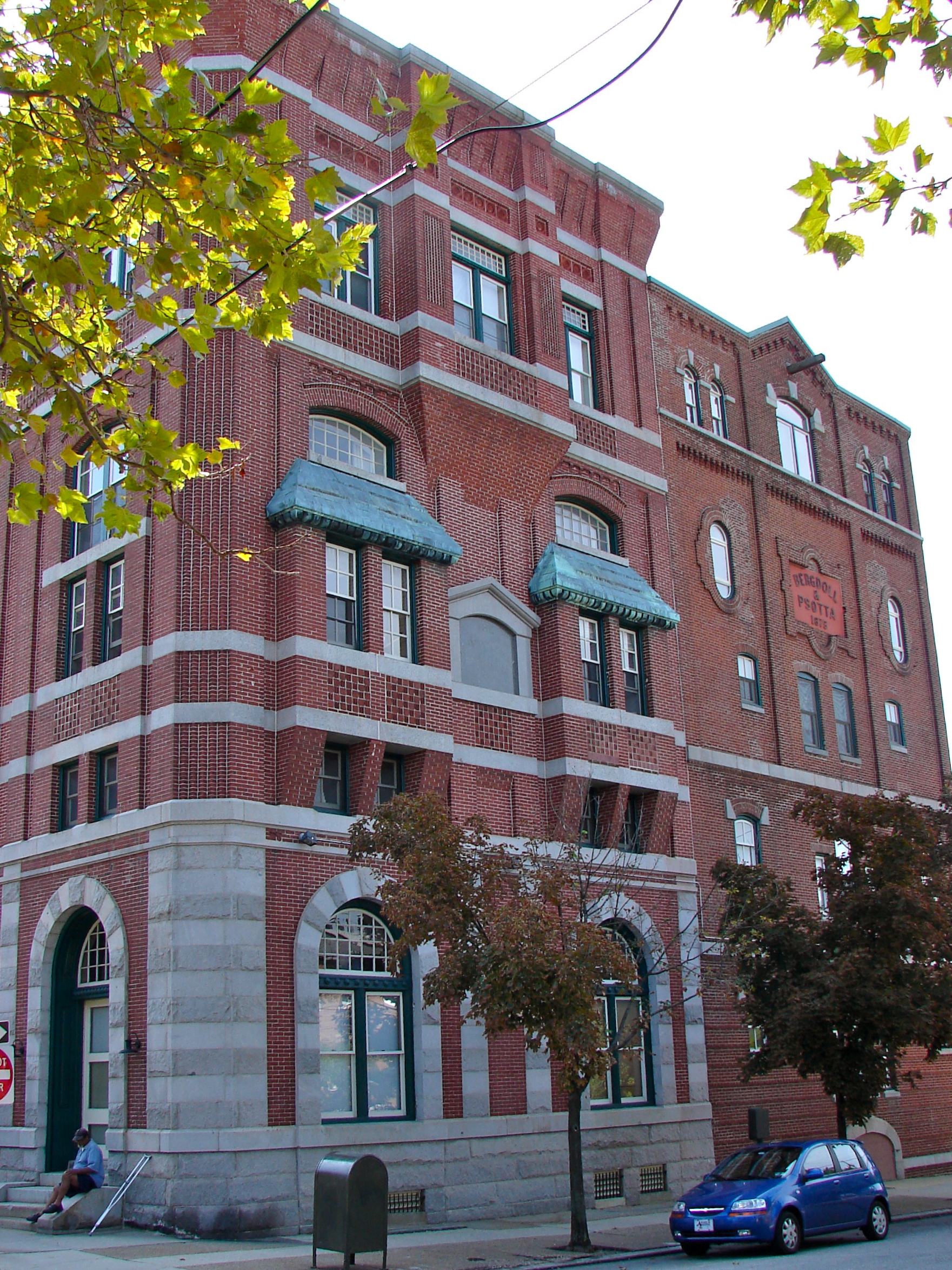
City Park Brewery, listed separately on the National Register of Historic Places

Breweries that operated in the neighborhood included:

- Bergner & Engel Brewing Company (Thompson Street between 32nd and 33rd, east side)
- Charles Eisner Brewery (Thompson Street between 32nd and 33rd, west side)
- F. A. Poth Brewing Company (31st & Jefferson Streets, NW corner)
- H. Mueller Centennial Brewery (31st & Jefferson Streets, NE corner)
- J. & P. Baltz Brewing Company (31st & Thompson Streets)
- Arnholt & Schaefer Brewing Company (31st and Thompson Streets, NE corner)
- G. Keller's Brewery (31st Street, west side, between Jefferson and Master)
- J. Bentz' Brewery (31st Street, west side, between Jefferson and Master)
- Thomas Perot Brewery (31st and Master Streets, NW corner)
- W. S. Perot (32nd and Thompson Streets, NW corner)
- Goldbeck & Eisele (31st and Thompson Streets, NE corner)
- Geo. F. Rothacker Brewery (31st Street, West side, between Thompson and Master)
- Eble & Herter (33rd Street and Pennsylvania Avenue)
- Francis Orth (later Burg & Pfaender, later Bergdoll Brewery; 33rd Street, south of Master Street)
- Henzler & Flach Brewery
- City Park Brewery (29th and Parrish Streets)
- Commonwealth Brewing Company (28th and Cambridge Streets)
- Keystone State Brewery (27th and Parrish Streets)
- Peter Schemm and Son (West College Ave. and Poplar Street)
- India Pale Ale Brewery (38th Street and Girard Avenue)
- Michel Gosse (27th & Thompson Streets)

== Transportation ==
SEPTA Route 15, a heritage streetcar line, runs through the neighborhood and connects to Girard Station on the Broad Street Line as well as the Market–Frankford Line further east at Front Street. Bus Routes 7, 48, and 49 also serve the area, traveling along North 29th Street between the Strawberry Mansion and Fairmount neighborhoods and crossing the Benjamin Franklin Parkway to and from Center City

== Education ==
Residents are in the School District of Philadelphia. Three K-8 schools include portions of the historic district : Edward Gideon, William Kelley, and Robert Morris. Morris residents are zoned to Vaux High School while the others are zoned to Strawberry Mansion High School. Previously Kelley was a feeder for Vaux High School.

== See also ==
- Breweries in Philadelphia
