= Olney-Oak Lane, Philadelphia =

Coordinates: 40.04759°N 75.10065°W

Olney-Oak Lane
- Neighborhood of Philadelphia
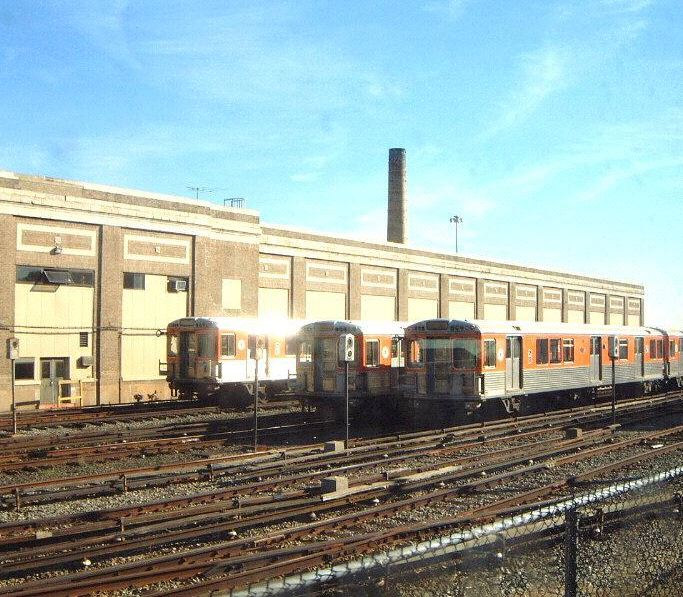
- Fern Rock Transportation Center

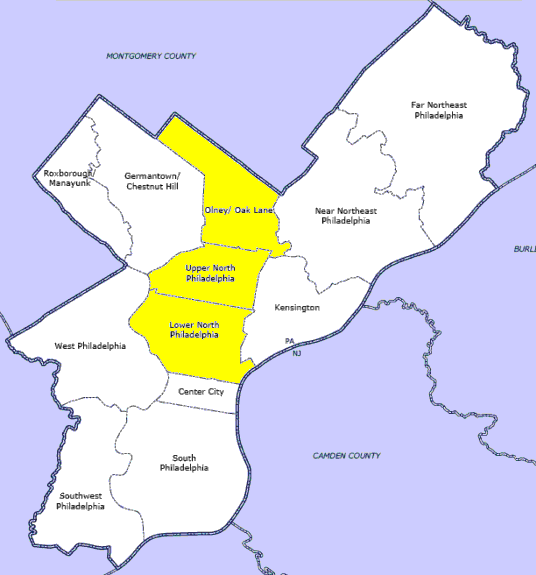
- Map of Philadelphia, with Olney-Oak Lane at top of highlighted area (click for larger image)
- Country: United States of America
- State: Pennsylvania
- County: Philadelphia
- City: Philadelphia

Population (2010)
  - Total: 168,770
- ZIP code: 19120; 19126; 19138; 19141; 19150

Olney-Oak Lane, Philadelphia, is a section of Philadelphia that is immediately north of North Philadelphia and south of Cheltenham. It is an area that consists of the now defunct township that was called "Bristol Township, Philadelphia County, Pennsylvania". The section is often excluded as part of North Philadelphia by city government agencies, though locally it is often referred to as "Uptown," along with the Germantown–Chestnut Hill area.

The section includes the neighborhoods of East Oak Lane and West Oak Lane, Feltonville, Fern Rock, Koreatown, Logan, Ogontz, Cedarbrook and Olney.

== Demographics ==
As of 2010, the Olney-Oak Lane section of Philadelphia had a population of 168,770, with 76,576 males, 92,195 females and a median age of 33.

Racial demographics:

- Non-Hispanic Black: 94,679 (56.1%)
- Hispanic or Latino of any race: 40,336 (23.9%)
- Non-Hispanic White: 15,526 (9.2%)
- Asian: 12,320 (7.3%)
- Mixed or Other: 5,906 (3.5%)

== See also ==
- Bristol Township, Philadelphia County, Pennsylvania
