= Hartranft, Philadelphia =

Neighborhood of Philadelphia, Pennsylvania, US

Hartranft
- Neighborhood
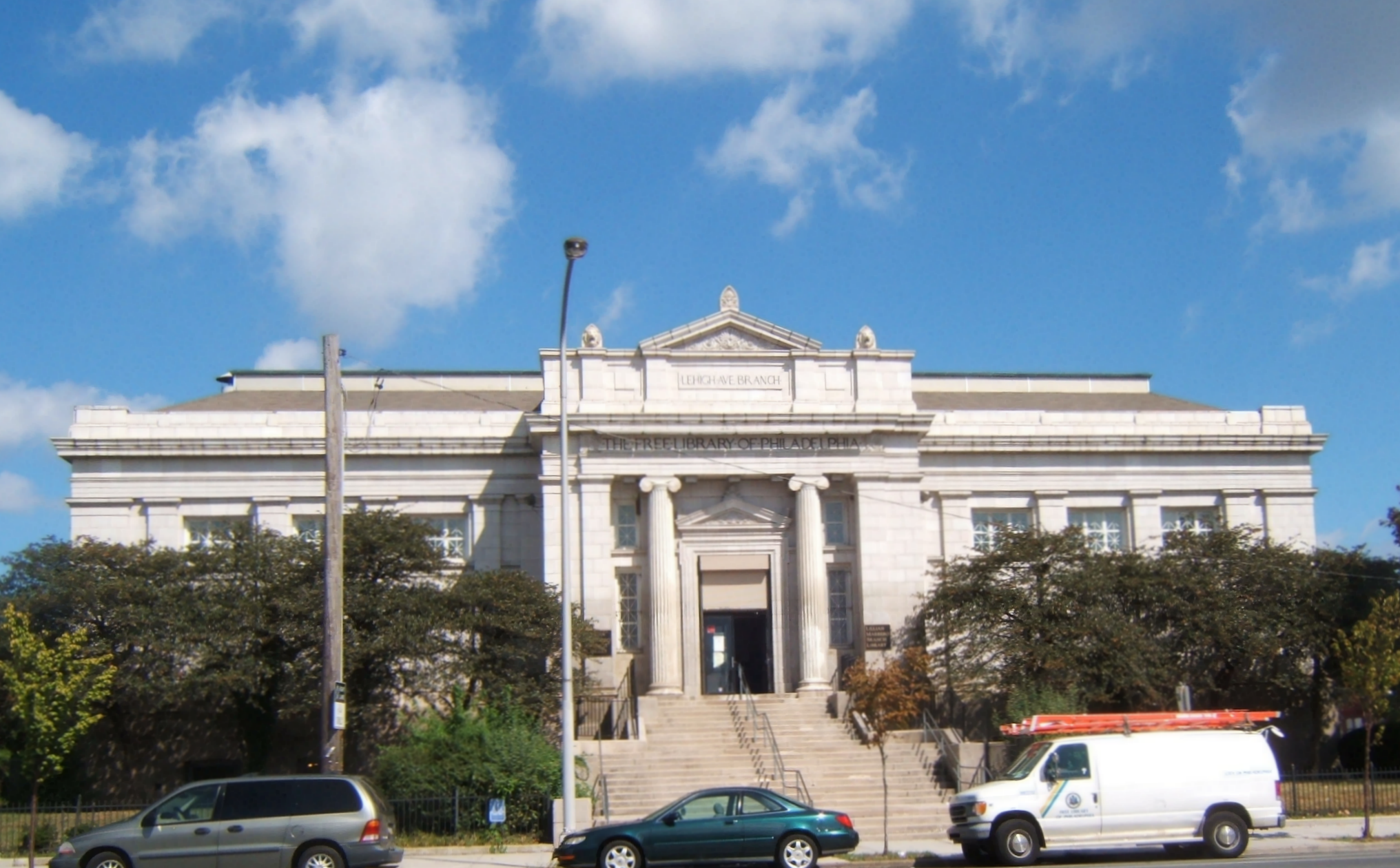
- Lillian Marrero Branch of the Free Library of Philadelphia is located in Hartranft

- Location within Philadelphia
- Country: United States
- State: Pennsylvania
- County: Philadelphia
- City: Philadelphia
- Postal codes: 19122 and 19133
- Area codes: 215, 267 and 445

Hartranft is a neighborhood in the central part of North Philadelphia section of Philadelphia, Pennsylvania.

Hartranft is on the border of the predominantly Black central region of North Philadelphia and the predominantly Hispanic eastern section of North Philadelphia. Bounded by 6th Street to the east, Broad Street to the west, Allegheny Avenue to the north, and Cecil B. Moore Avenue to the south. Bordering neighborhoods are Fairhill to the north, West Kensington to the east, Cecil B. Moore to the west, and Ludlow to the south.

The neighborhood falls into the ZIP Codes 19122 and 19133.

The demolished Northern National Bank building was added to the National Register of Historic Places in 1985.

== Demographics ==
As of the Census of 2010 Hartranft had 15,883 people and was 49.6% Hispanic (primarily Puerto Rican), 29.9% African American, 13% White, and 7.5% mixed or other.

44% of its people live below the poverty line.

The average housing structure was built in 1946. 43.12% of all properties were vacant as of 2000.

== Education ==
Public schools in the Hartranft district are operated by the School District of Philadelphia.

The neighborhood is home to Temple University.

The Free Library of Philadelphia Lillian Marrero Branch serves West Kensington.
