= Fairhill, Philadelphia =

Fairhill
- Neighborhood of Philadelphia
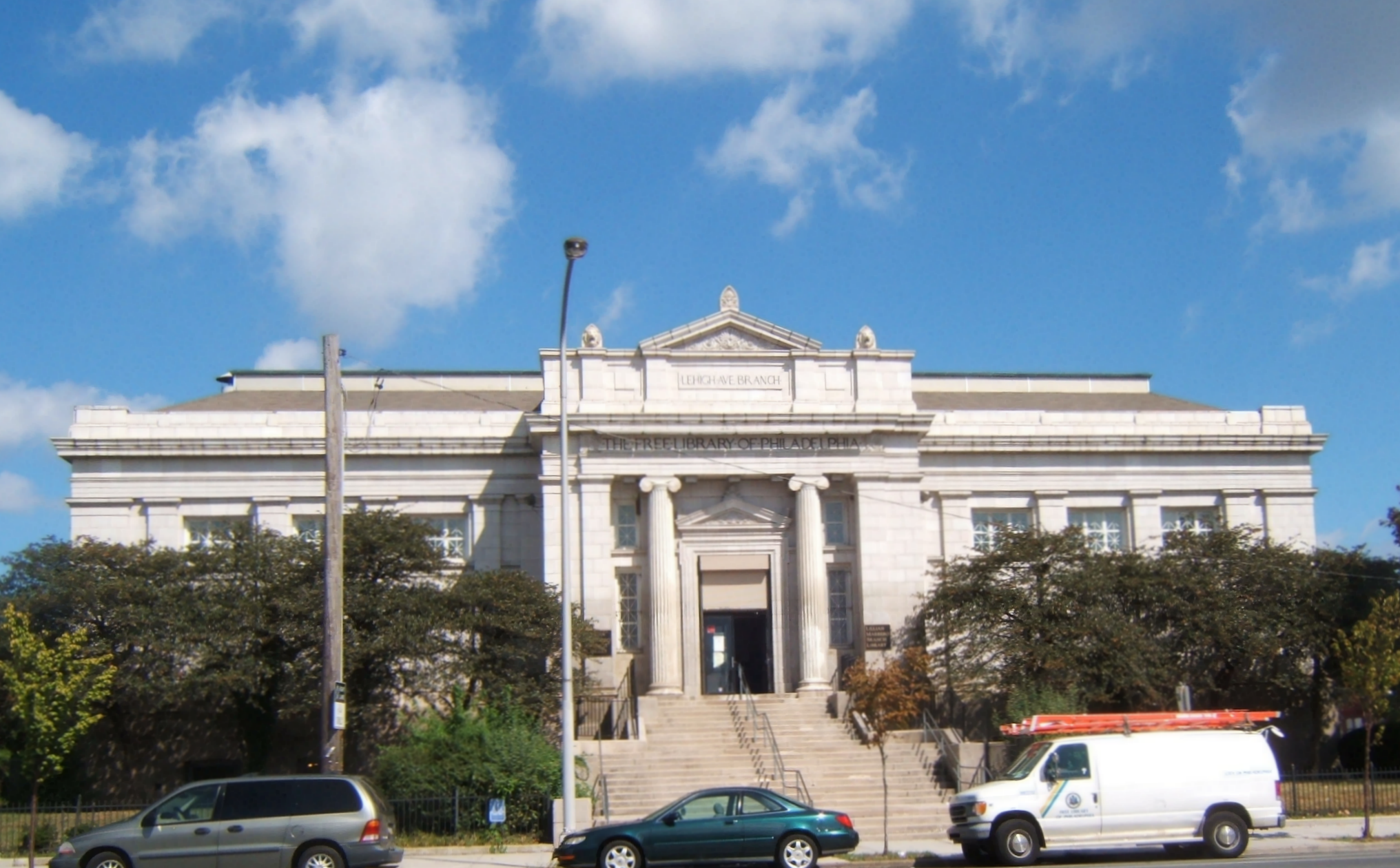
- Lillian Marrero Library in Fairhill

- Location in Philadelphia
- Coordinates: 39°59′40″N 75°08′42″W
- Country: United States
- State: Pennsylvania
- County: Philadelphia
- City: Philadelphia
- Area codes: 215, 267 and 445

Fairhill is a neighborhood on the east side of the North Philadelphia section of Philadelphia, Pennsylvania, United States. Fairhill is bordered by Front Street to the east, Germantown Avenue (10th Street) to the west, Allegheny Avenue to the north, and Cumberland Street to the south. The neighborhood serves as the center of the Hispanic community of Philadelphia, and is known for its "El Centro de Oro" commercial strip along North 5th Street. Fairhill is adjacent to Harrowgate and West Kensington to the east, Hartranft to the south, Glenwood to the west, and Hunting Park to the north.

== History ==
The area that is now the Fairhill neighborhood was at one time home to the Isaac Norris family's Fair Hill estate. Norris was an early merchant and later mayor of Philadelphia. It is also home to the Fair Hill Burial Ground, a cemetery that Quakers established in 1703. George Fox obtained the land for the cemetery from William Penn. The cemetery is on the National Register for Historic Places.

Fairhill began to develop its urban character in the 1880s. Many of the new residents at this time were German immigrants, particularly German Catholics. With the approval of the Archdiocese and the help of Fr. Henry Stommel of Doylestown, the German Catholic families in the area established Saint Bonaventure Parish (also known as Saint Bonaventura) in 1890. The original parish building was at Ninth and Auburn Streets. After establishing the parish, Fr. Stommel turned over its leadership to Fr. Hubert Hammeke, a German immigrant priest. In 1894, the parish began building a Gothic style church. Fr. Hammeke served as the project manager for the church's construction and construction on the new church finished in 1906. The finished church at Ninth and Cambria Streets included an impressive clock tower and spire. Fr. Hammeke would lead the parish until his death in 1937.

In the 1950s, the demographics of the Fairhill area began to change. The German-American families began leaving the neighborhood with African-Americans and Latinos – mainly Puerto Ricans – taking their place. By 1975, the parish had initiated a Spanish mass and a Carino Center for Spanish-speaking children. The parish, including the school, closed in 1993; St. Bonaventure Parish church was demolished in 2013–14.

== Geography ==
=== El Centro de Oro ===
El Centro de Oro ("The Golden Downtown"), also known as "El Bloque de Oro," ("Golden Block"), is a commercial district located at 5th Street and Lehigh Avenue. It includes notable Puerto Rican businesses and organizations such as Taller Puertorriqueño (Puerto Rican Workshop), Asociación Puertorriqueños en Marcha (Association of Puerto Ricans on the March), and Artístas y Músicos Latino Americanos (Latin American Artists and Musicians).

El Centro de Oro was established in the 1970s by community leaders from an older Latino community that was in the process of being displaced from the Spring Garden area as a result of gentrification. Organizations such as El Concilio de Organizaciones Hispanas de Filadelfia (Council of Spanish-speaking Organizations of Philadelphia) and the Spanish Merchants Association of Philadelphia encouraged Latino businesses and organizations to move to the Fairhill and Kensington neighborhoods and worked to develop Latino and Puerto Rican-oriented housing, cooperatives, and social service organizations.

== Demographics ==
As of the census of 2010, the racial makeup of Fairhill is 80.2% Hispanic of any race, 15.1% non Hispanic Black, 2.3% non Hispanic White, 1.4% Asian, and 1% all other. It has the highest concentration of Hispanics of any neighborhood in Philadelphia, which is over 10 times larger than the overall percentage of Hispanics living in Philadelphia. The neighborhood is mainly made up of Puerto Ricans, But also has significant populations of Dominicans, Cubans, Colombians, and Brazilians, as well as other Hispanics. Its poverty rate is 61%, which is about five times the national average, as of Census 2010. The neighborhood is sometimes nicknamed "El Centro de Oro" (Spanish for "the center of gold"), and is considered to be the center of the city's Hispanic community.

Fairhill, among other areas of eastern North Philadelphia, is known for having some of the highest concentrations of Puerto Ricans in the United States outside Puerto Rico (which is a US territory). Furthermore, the area west of 5th street is over two-thirds Hispanic, with the remaining nearly one-third being black, while areas of the neighborhood east of 5th street are nearly 100 percent Hispanic.

In 2002 23.5% of the houses in Fairhill were occupied by the owners. 85% of the housing in Fairhill consists of row houses. 2.6% of the buildings in the area are zoned for commercial use; Steve Volk of Philadelphia Weekly stated that efforts to replace drug dealing with legitimate commercial activity have been stymied in recent years. As of Census 2010, Zip Code 19133 which encompasses most of Fairhill and portions of neighboring Glenwood and Hartranft, is the poorest zip code in Philadelphia, having a poverty rate of 61% and a median household income of $14,185.

== Crime ==
Steve Lopez's novel Third and Indiana made the intersection well known. The intersection of 3rd Street and Indiana Avenue was listed as number two in a 2007 list of the city's top ten recreational drug corners according to an article by Philadelphia Weekly reporter Steve Volk. Other intersections in Fairhill included in the list of the top drug corners included Fifth Street and Westmoreland Street in third place, and A Street and Westmoreland Street in seventh place.

=== Philadelphia Badlands ===
The Philadelphia Badlands is a section of North Philadelphia and Lower Northeast Philadelphia, in Pennsylvania that is known for an abundance of open-air recreational drug markets and drug-related violence. It has amorphous and somewhat disputed boundaries, but is generally agreed to include the 25th police district.

Usually, it is widely understood to be an area between Kensington Avenue to the east and Broad Street to the west, and between Hunting Park Avenue to the north and York Street to the south, mostly coinciding with the neighborhoods of Fairhill, Glenwood, Hunting Park, Harrowgate, Stanton, North Central, West Kensington, Hartranft, and Kensington.

The term "The Badlands" was popularized in part by the novel Third and Indiana by then Philadelphia Inquirer columnist Steve Lopez. The neighborhood also was featured in several episodes of ABC's Nightline. The intersection of 3rd Street and Indiana Avenue was listed number two in a 2007 list of the city's top ten drug corners according to an article by Philadelphia Weekly reporter Steve Volk.

The term Badlands was first used by Lt. John Gallo, who headed the East Division Narcotics Task Force. Its use spread, with many people attempting to take credit for the moniker. It was Gallo's work along with ASAC Billy Retton that worked about a dozen long-term investigations in the 25th and 26th Police Districts that preceded "Operation Sunrise". Ted Koppel, Geraldo Rivera, 20/20 and 48 Hours all rode with Gallo at one time or another, and it was during this time that Gallo was able to make the name stick.

At one time a center of heavy industry, much of the Badlands' urban landscape is now characterized by vacant warehouses and tightly-packed strips of brick row houses constructed for the working class of the neighborhood. Like most industrial cities in the eastern United States, Philadelphia suffered economic decline following the movement of industry to either the suburbs or developing countries and has suffered as a result.

The Philadelphia Badlands contain a diverse mix of ethnicities. Puerto Ricans are the largest group, but the area also contains large populations of Black Americans, Irish Americans, and Dominican Americans. The area encompasses El Centro de Oro, the heart of Philadelphia's Puerto Rican community. Although much of the area's crime stems from local neighborhood-based street gangs and the drug trade, larger, more organized gangs also operate in the area, including the Black Mafia, Latin Kings, and various motorcycle gangs.

The area's reputation has been countered by community activists and nonprofit organizations such as Centro Nueva Creación, which in 2010 conducted a summer children's program, "The Goodlands Photographers", aimed at helping young people photograph and display positive images of their neighborhood.

== Government and infrastructure ==
The United States Post Office operates the Fairhill Post Office in Suite 2 at 217 West Lehigh Avenue.

== Education ==
School District of Philadelphia operates public schools. Fairhill School, a K-8 school, serves Fairhill. Residents zoned to Fairhill School are also zoned to Thomas Alva Edison High School / John C. Fareira Skills Center. Fairhill Community High School (FCHS), an alternative charter high school for dropouts and students at risk for dropping out, is located in Fairhill.

The Free Library of Philadelphia Lillian Marrero Library serves Fairhill. It was previously the Lehigh Avenue Branch, and Lillian E. Marrero had served as the library's supervisor.

== Parks and gardens ==
=== Historic Fairhill ===
Historic Fairhill is a Quaker burial ground and park. The property was neglected for many years and became a haven for criminal activity. Quakers and community leaders collaborated in the revitalization of the grounds. As part of the Historic Germantown Consortium, they now regularly hold events in the park/graveyard.

The Fair Hill Burial Ground is home to many notable Quakers including Lucretia Mott, an early feminist activist and strong advocate for ending slavery

== See also ==
- History of Philadelphia
  - Puerto Ricans in Philadelphia
- List of Philadelphia neighborhoods
