= Philadelphia Badlands =

Neighborhood of Philadelphia, PA, US

North Philadelphia
- Neighborhood of Philadelphia
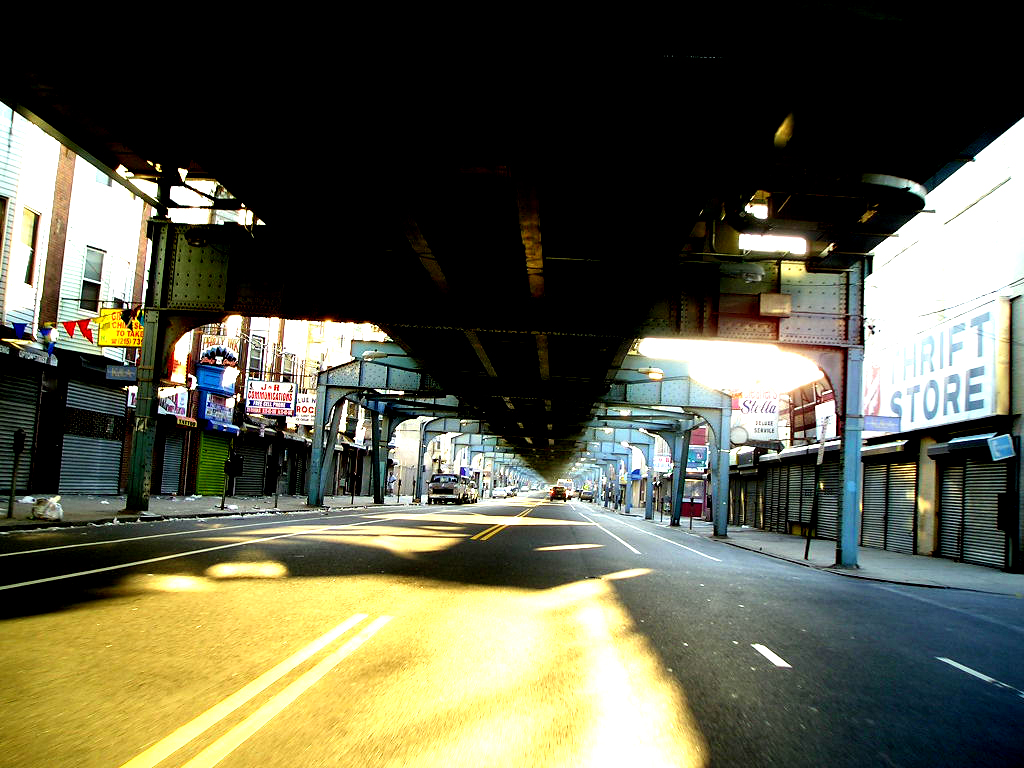
- The Market–Frankford Line in the Kensington section of Philadelphia
- Interactive map of North Philadelphia
- State: Pennsylvania
- County: Philadelphia
- City: Philadelphia

The Philadelphia Badlands is a section of North Philadelphia and Lower Northeast Philadelphia in Philadelphia, Pennsylvania that is known for an abundance of open-air recreational drug markets and drug-related violence. It has amorphous and somewhat disputed boundaries, but is generally agreed to include the 25th police district.

It is widely typically defined as encompassing the area between Kensington Avenue to the east and Broad Street to the west, and between Hunting Park Avenue to the north and York Street to the south, mostly coinciding with the Fairhill, Glenwood, Hunting Park, Hartranft, Harrowgate, Kensington, North Central, Stanton, and West Kensington sections of Philadelphia, the nation's sixth-largest city as of 2020.

== Etymology ==
The term "The Badlands" was popularized in part by the novel Third and Indiana by Steve Lopez, then a columnist for The Philadelphia Inquirer. The neighborhood also was featured in several episodes of ABC's Nightline. The intersection of 3rd Street and Indiana Avenue was listed number two in a 2007 list of the city's top ten drug corners according to an article by Philadelphia Weekly reporter Steve Volk.

The term "Badlands" was first used by Lt. John Gallo, who headed the East Division Narcotics Task Force. Its use spread, with many people attempting to take credit for the moniker. It was Gallo's work along with ASAC Billy Retton that worked about a dozen long-term investigations in the 25th and 26th Police Districts that preceded "Operation Sunrise". Ted Koppel, Geraldo Rivera, 20/20, and 48 Hours all rode with Gallo at one time or another, and it was during this time that Gallo was able to make the name stick.

== History and demographics ==
At one time a center of heavy industry, much of the Badlands' urban landscape is now characterized by vacant warehouses and tightly packed strips of brick row houses constructed for the working class of the neighborhood. Like most industrial cities in the eastern United States, Philadelphia suffered economic decline following the movement of industry to either the suburbs or Third World countries.

The Philadelphia Badlands contain a diverse mix of ethnicities. Puerto Ricans are the largest group, but the area also contains large populations of Black Americans, Irish Americans, and Dominican Americans. The area encompasses El Centro de Oro, the heart of Philadelphia's Puerto Rican community. Although much of the area's crime stems from local neighborhood-based street gangs and the drug trade, larger, more organized gangs also operate in the area, including the Black Mafia, Latin Kings, and various motorcycle gangs.

Aside from less-organized gang activity, the Badlands is also known as the founding location and current turf of the Irish-American organized crime group known as the K&A Gang, also known as the Northeast Philly Irish Mob. As of 2012, Irish Americans comprised approximately 12% of the population in the Badlands.

The area's reputation has been countered by community activists and nonprofit organizations such as Centro Nueva Creación, which in 2010 conducted a summer children's program, The Goodlands Photographers, aimed at helping young people photograph and display positive images of their neighborhood.
