= Vijay Gupta =

American violinist (born 1987)

- Born: Robert Vijay Gupta; 1987 (age 38–39)
- Education: Mount Saint Mary College; Manhattan School of Music; Marist College; Yale School of Music
- Occupations: Violinist, speaker, author
- Instrument: Violin

Robert Vijay Gupta (born 1987) is an American violinist, speaker, and author. He is the author of the memoir Restrung: A Memoir of Music and Transformation, published by Da Capo Press in 2026. He is a 2018 recipient of the MacArthur "Genius" Grant.

== Biography ==
(Robert) Vijay Gupta was born in 1987 and grew up in the mid-Hudson Valley of New York, near Poughkeepsie. His parents had immigrated from Bengal, India in the 1970s. At the age of seven, Gupta enrolled in the pre-college program at the Juilliard School and, at the age of 11, he performed solo for the first time with the Israel Philharmonic Orchestra, under the baton of Zubin Mehta. Gupta toured internationally as a soloist and recitalist, performing across the United States, India, Europe and Japan. He enrolled in undergraduate studies at Mount Saint Mary College in New York at age 13, initiating coursework towards a degree in pre-medical biology. At 15, he started a second undergraduate degree in violin performance at the Manhattan School of Music, studying under the then concertmaster of the New York Philharmonic, Glenn Dicterow. At 17, he earned a BA degree from Marist College, in biology. Gupta held neurobiology research internships at CUNY Hunter College and the Harvard Institutes of Medicine, studying spinal cord regeneration and the biochemical pathways of Parkinson's Disease. At Harvard, Gupta met Gottfried Schlaug, a researcher and musician studying the impact of music on the brain of aphasic (stroke) patients. Gupta went on to earn an M.M. in 2007 in Violin Performance from the Yale School of Music, where he studied with Ani Kavafian. Shortly after graduating from Yale, Gupta won his first orchestral audition and joined the Los Angeles Philharmonic in 2007, when he was 19 years old – the youngest violinist ever to join a top-tier American orchestra.

Gupta stumbled into advocacy for the homeless of Los Angeles shortly after joining the LA Philharmonic. Gupta joined a group of LA Phil musicians close to Nathaniel Ayers, a Juilliard-trained double-bassist whose mental illness left him homeless. Gupta met Ayers through Steve Lopez, the Los Angeles Times columnist who did a series on Ayers, which became a book and movie called The Soloist.

In 2010, Gupta founded Street Symphony, a non-profit organization providing musical engagement, dialogue and teaching artistry for homeless and incarcerated communities in Los Angeles. The organization performs at jails, prisons, shelters and transitional facilities and has presented more than 1500 musical performances and workshops, spanning genres of music ranging from classical, choral, jazz, mariachi, reggae and West-African drumming. Every December, the group performs Handel's "Messiah," with musicians from skid row joining with professional musicians to perform. The organization's performances have been highlighted by the LA Times and The New Yorker magazine as being among the most prominent and notable performances in the country.

In a 2017 column for The New Yorker, music critic Alex Ross described Gupta as "a visionary violinist...[and] one of the most radical thinkers in the unradical world of American classical music. With Street Symphony, he has created a formidable new model for how musical institutions should engage with the world around them." Ross calls Gupta "a riveting speaker, at once jovial and intense. He talks rapidly, precisely, and with startling candor." In 2012, Gupta presented a TED Talk entitled "Between Music and Medicine", which has received millions of views. He was featured in TIME 100 NEXT in 2019. In 2024, Gupta was inducted to the American Academy of Arts and Sciences.

== Recent projects and residencies ==
In 2023, Gupta served as Artist-in-Residence with Music Worcester in Massachusetts, performing solo recitals, collaborating with local non-profits and educational institutions, and leading the newly formed Darshan Trio in concerts that explore storytelling and multicultural programs.

In June 2025, the Los Angeles Times hailed Gupta's program *When the Violin*, with dancer Yamini Kalluri, as "brilliant, beautiful, gripping" in a review of his performance blending works by J. S. Bach and Reena Esmail.

Gupta is a founding member of Darshan Trio, formed in 2021 with pianist Dominic Cheli and cellist Yoshika Masuda. The ensemble presents innovative, multimedia-and-storytelling oriented chamber works, performing both locally (including Worcester, CA) and on national stages.

Gupta has also collaborated with Kuchipudi dancer Yamini Kalluri in When the Violin, blending traditional Indian dance with Western classical repertoire, as part of his work during the Music Worcester residency.

== Speaking and writing ==
A noted public speaker, Gupta has shared his work with dozens of conferences, campuses, corporations, and communities across the United States over the past decade, including The Richmond Forum, The Aspen Institute, Hallmark, Accenture, Mayo Clinic, the U.S. Psychiatric Congress, the American Planning Association, and the League of American Orchestras. In June 2020, Gupta delivered the 33rd annual Nancy Hanks Lecture on Arts and Public Policy for Americans for the Arts.

Gupta has presented three TED Talks, which have collectively garnered millions of views. He has been described by The Today Show as "a master of music and medicine", and was featured in Time magazine's 2019 "TIME 100 Next" list.

Gupta's first book, Restrung: A Memoir of Music and Transformation, was published by Da Capo Press in June 2026, with a foreword by Pico Iyer. Publishers Weekly described the memoir as an "inspiring account" and called it "a virtuoso performance." In the American Suzuki Journal, Andrew Braddock wrote that Gupta "threads together an assemblage of personal history, musicological vignette, and social critique" and called the book "masterful."

=== Restrung ===
Gupta's memoir, Restrung: A Memoir of Music and Transformation, was published by Da Capo Press in June 2026, with a foreword by Pico Iyer. The book examines Gupta's childhood as a violin prodigy, his years in the Los Angeles Philharmonic, burnout, addiction, and the founding of Street Symphony. Publishers Weekly described the memoir as an "inspiring account" and called it "a virtuoso performance." In the American Suzuki Journal, Andrew Braddock called the book "masterful" and wrote that Gupta combines personal history, musicological writing, and social critique with "radical emotional vulnerability."
