= Olde Richmond, Philadelphia =

Olde Richmond
- Neighborhood of Philadelphia
- Location within Philadelphia
- Country: United States
- State: Pennsylvania
- County: Philadelphia
- City: Philadelphia
- Area codes: 215, 267 and 445

Olde Richmond is a neighborhood in the River Wards section of Philadelphia, Pennsylvania. It is notable for its historically large Polish immigrant, Polish American community, and Irish American community. The U.S. ZIP Code for Olde Richmond is 19125 and its post office is located at 1602 Frankford Avenue (in Fishtown).

== Geography ==
The neighborhood is bounded by East Lehigh Avenue to the northeast, the Delaware River to the east, Trenton Avenue to the northwest and York Street to the southwest. The boundary between the neighborhood and East Kensington roughly aligns with the boundaries of the Kensington District and the Richmond District before Philadelphia's Act of Consolidation.

Some consider Frankford Avenue to be the western boundary of the neighborhood (as it was before the Act of Consolidation). However, both Olde Richmond's and East Kensington's official community organizations today consider Trenton Avenue to be the boundary between East Kensington and Olde Richmond.

Some area residents refer to a small section or portion of Olde Richmond as "Cione", which refers to the Cione Playground and Recreation Center, which is located at 2600 Aramingo Avenue. Other sections of the neighborhood have been referred to as “Flatiron”, the section west of Aramingo Ave. named after a triangular or flatiron-shaped lot formed by the intersections of Cumberland Ave, Almond St, and Moyer St, and “Richmond”, the section east of Aramingo Ave. extending to the Delaware River. The neighborhood has also been known to Catholic residents as “Saint Anne’s”, referencing St. Anne Catholic Church and the Catholic Parish system. Adjacent neighborhoods are Port Richmond to the northeast, Kensington to the northwest, and Fishtown to the south/southwest.

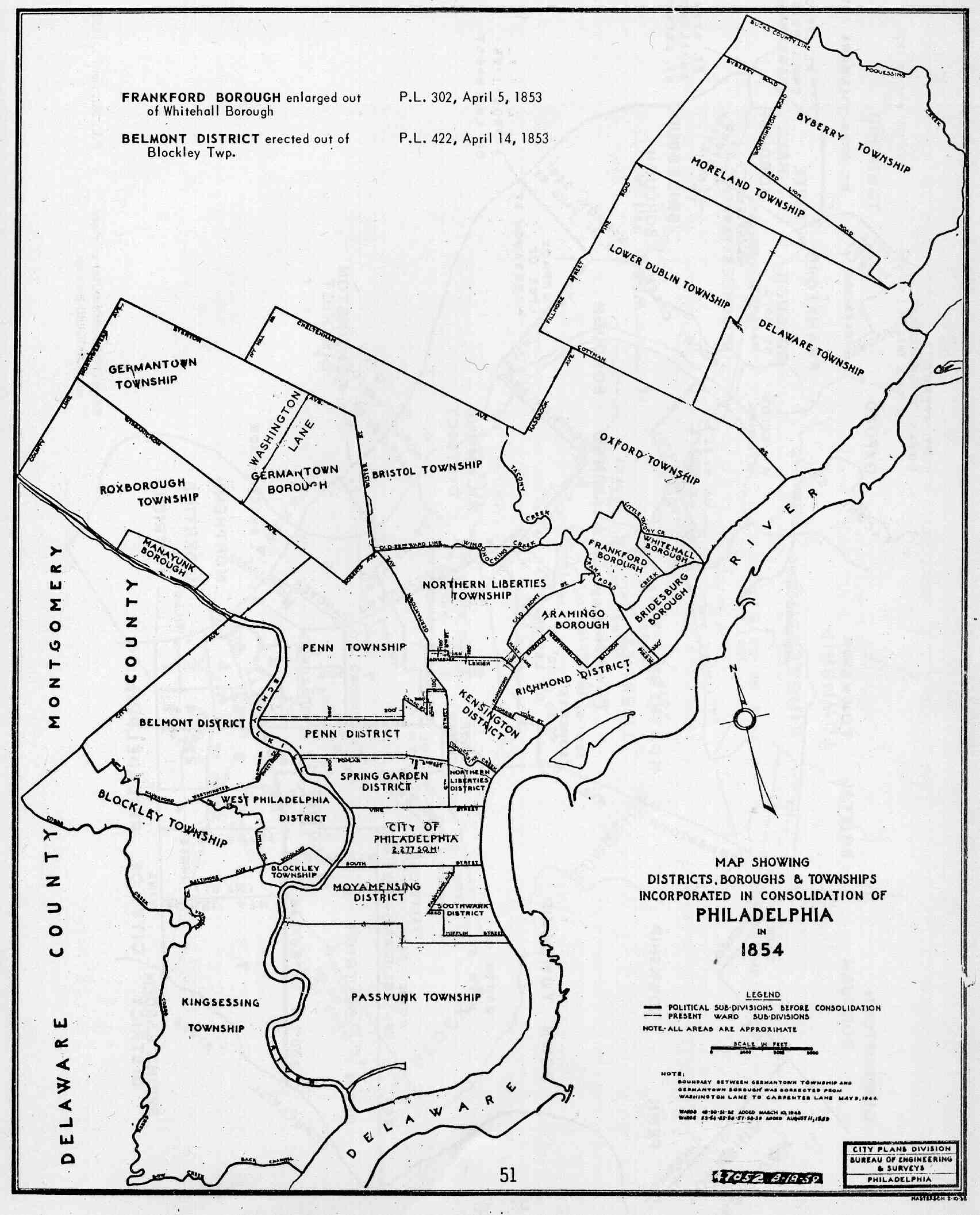
Map of Philadelphia County prior to consolidation, showing boundary between Kensington District and Richmond District

== Transportation ==
=== Mass transit ===
SEPTA offers regular bus routes that easily connect Olde Richmond to Center City, West Philadelphia, South Philadelphia, and the Northeast. SEPTA bus routes 15, 25, 39, and 43 service the community. SEPTA Route 15, a surface line trolley running along Girard Avenue and Richmond Street, services the community; however Route 15 from the intersection of Frankford and Girard Avenues to the Westmoreland Loop is temporarily serviced by bus as portions of Richmond Street and Girard Avenue are affected by the construction at the Girard Avenue Interchange of U.S. Interstate 95.

=== Rapid transit ===
Nearby rapid transit stops of the Market–Frankford Line, commonly referred to as the "EL" or the "Blue Line", include Spring Garden Station (connection to Route 25 and Route 43), Girard Station (connection to Route 15), Berks Station (connection to Route 3), and York–Dauphin Station (connection to Route 39).

=== Roads and highways ===
Automobile continues to be a popular method of transportation for area residents. By highway, Olde Richmond is conveniently accessible to Center City (just one exit off the Vine Street Expressway/Interstate 676), South Philadelphia, and Northeast Philadelphia and nearby large city streets and avenues include Aramingo Avenue, Richmond Street, York Street, Lehigh Avenue, and Frankford Avenue. Interstate 95 is easily accessed by the Girard Avenue exit of the highway. Interstate 95 South on-ramp is accessible by way of Aramingo Avenue-south, and while under construction, the 95 North on-ramp is accessible by following Richmond Street-north to Castor Avenue (the Allegheny/Castor Exit of Interstate 95). The neighborhood is also located just north of the Benjamin Franklin Bridge and south of the Betsy Ross Bridge, making parts of south New Jersey, such as Camden County also easily accessible.

=== Bicycle lanes ===
In recent years, Olde Richmond has experienced an increase in bike lanes on neighborhood roadways including portions of York Street, Lehigh Avenue, Aramingo Avenue, and Richmond Street. Bicycle lanes easily connect Olde Richmond to nearby neighborhoods, such as Fishtown and Port Richmond, as well as connect to major roadways, such as Delaware Avenue and Frankford Avenue. Additional bicycle lanes and walking paths are to be constructed with the completion of the Girard Avenue Interchange Improvement Project.
