= Richmond District =

Richmond District may refer to:

- Richmond District, San Francisco, a neighborhood in the city of San Francisco
- Richmond District, Pennsylvania, a former area of the city of Philadelphia
