= River Wards, Philadelphia =

Coordinates: 39.983°N 75.093°W

River Wards
- Neighborhood of Philadelphia
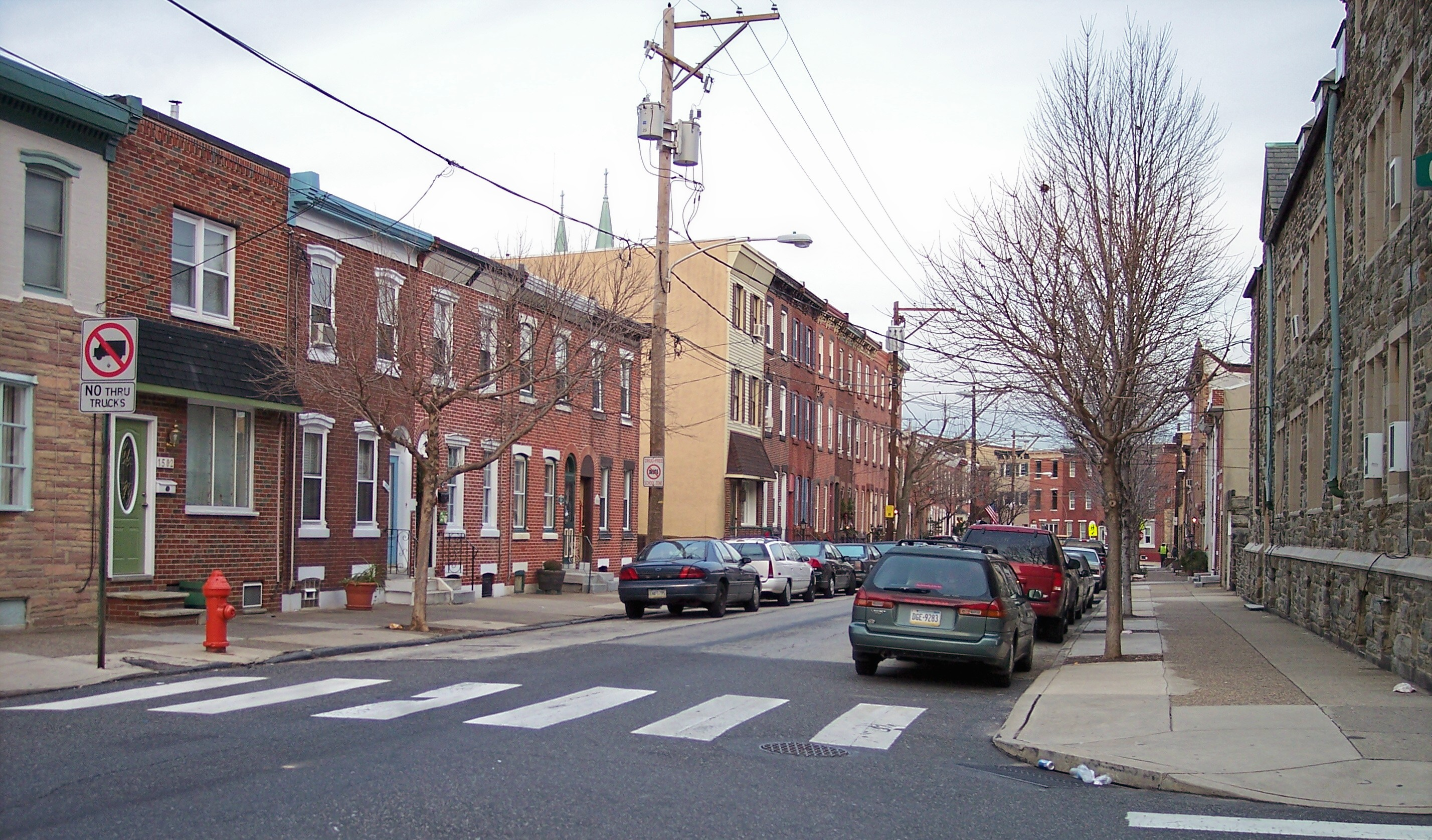
- 1500 block of E. Berks Street, a typical residential street in the River Wards neighborhood of Fishtown, in 2007

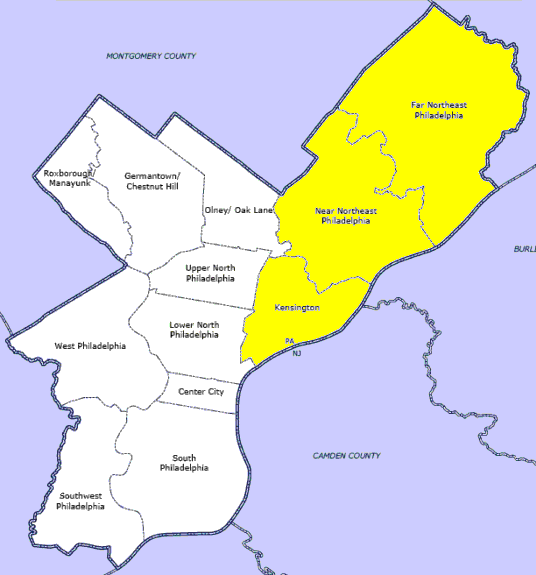
- Map of Philadelphia County with Northeast highlighted. The area labeled as 'Kensington' is roughly equivalent to the River Wards. Click for larger image.
- Country: United States of America
- State: Pennsylvania
- County: Philadelphia
- City: Philadelphia

Area
  - Total: 8.49 sq mi (22.0 km^{2})

Population (2010)
  - Total: 88,452
  - Density: 10,417/sq mi (4,022/km^{2})
- ZIP code: 19124, 19125, 19134, 19137

The River Wards is a section of Philadelphia, Pennsylvania, United States, located along the Delaware River northeast of Center City Philadelphia. 'River Wards' is the commonly used name for an area including several neighborhoods, such as Fishtown, Kensington, Port Richmond and Olde Richmond. The River Wards are located at the border of North Philadelphia and Northeast Philadelphia, and may be considered part of one or the other, or as a separate entity. The area is sometimes also known as 'Kensington-Richmond'.

The area is defined by its industrial past, having suffered the effects of deindustrialization in the 20th century. Today, the River Wards are known both for gentrification, which has brought an arts, culture, and dining scene to the area (particularly in Fishtown), and for disinvestment, with outer Kensington hosting an infamous open-air drug market.

== Included neighborhoods ==
- Fishtown
- Kensington
- Port Richmond
- Olde Richmond
- Harrowgate
- Bridesburg

The River Wards includes all or part of the following pre-Act of Consolidation municipalities:

- Kensington District
- Richmond District
- Aramingo Borough
- Bridesburg Borough
- Northern Liberties Township

== Demographics ==
As defined by the Philadelphia Urban Planning Commission, the River Wards had a population of 68,749 as of 2010.

=== Racial and ethnic demographics, 2010 ===
- White: 71%
- Black: 11%
- Asian: 2.5%
- Other: 11.2%
- Hispanic or Latino of any race: 20%
