= KCT =

KCT may mean:

- Kansas City Terminal Railway, terminal railroad in the Kansas City metropolitan area
- Kaolin clotting time, a medical test used to detect lupus anticoagulant
- Kensington Corridor Trust, a neighborhood trust in Philadelphia, Pennsylvania,.
- Kigali City Tower, the tallest building in Rwanda
- King College of Technology in Namakkal, India
- Koggala Airport near Galle, Sri Lanka, IATA code
- Kungchantang, the Wade–Giles spelling of the Chinese Communist Party
- Korps Commandotroepen, Royal Netherlands Army specialist forces
- Knight Commander of Temple, a modern Knight of the Order of the Temple
- Kumaraguru College of Technology in Coimbatore, India
