= Third and Indiana =

Novel by Steve Lopez

- Book cover
- Author: Steve Lopez
- Publisher: Viking Books
- Publication date: September 1, 1994
- ISBN: 9780670856763

Third and Indiana is a novel written by Steve Lopez about the experiences of several people connected to 14-year-old Gabriel Santoro, while living in the dangerous gang-controlled streets of the Badlands section of Philadelphia, Pennsylvania. The novel gave notoriety to Third Street and Indiana Avenue, a real-life intersection in the Fairhill area known for the prevalence of drug dealers. The first printing had 50,000 copies printed. Published in 1994, it was Lopez's first novel.

== Plot ==
Gabriel Santoro, a 14-year-old boy, runs away from home when he learns that people in the drug dealing gang he works for, the Black Caps, suspect him of stealing drug money; he owes $2,000. He hides away in the house occupied by Eddie Passarelli, a man from South Philadelphia who himself owes money to the mafia and whose marriage deteriorates after he leaves his home and his affair is discovered; his girlfriend then proceeds to break up with him. Meanwhile, Ofelia, the mother of Gabriel, searches for him on her bicycle.

Eddie and Gabriel work together to get themselves out of their situations. The head of the Black Caps, Diablo, pursues Gabriel, trying to find him and kill him. In the novel Diablo kills Lalo Camacho, Gabriel's friend, and Father Laetner, an activist priest who works with Ofelia. Gabriel develops a relationship with his girlfriend, Marisol, who helps him. Eddie's acquaintance, Mike Inverso, convinces them to steal the ring of Anthony DeMarco, the deceased mayor, from a funeral home in South Philadelphia as a way of paying their way out of trouble, but the characters have trouble finding a way of generating money from the ring. Thin Jimmy, the mafioso who Eddie owes money to, dies, but Eddie resolves to continue helping Gabriel. Ofelia eventually meets Eddie and learns of how he had sheltered her son, but Gabriel is now away from the two of them when Ofelia and Eddie meet.

Gabriel puts the stolen ring in Diablo's car as a way of framing him. Ralph, Gabriel's friend, tasked by Diablo to kill Gabriel, threatens him but commits suicide instead. As Gabriel runs down a street, Diablo shoots him. The boy runs into the arms of Ofelia. A police officer, Bill Bagno, uses the stolen mayor's ring as a pretext to finally arrest Diablo, something law enforcement had been unable to accomplish. Eddie, with the approval of Bagno, assaults Diablo in retaliation for his shooting of Gabriel. Gabriel is taken to St. Christopher's Hospital for Children, but dies of his injuries. Ofelia discovers that Gabriel had painted images of children who died from drug violence on Broad Street, pointing the way to City Hall as a way of indicting city officials of indifference. At the conclusion, Ofelia herself paints Gabriel's image.

== Development ==
Steve Lopez arrived in Philadelphia in the mid-1980s. Lopez said that he began considering writing a novel because "what I saw in the neighborhood that I found so shocking and so unlike what I had seen in my years of reporting in other cities. There were just so many compelling images that I would walk away with every time I went into the neighborhood." Lopez said that the novel was, as paraphrased by Douglas J. Keating of the Philadelphia Inquirer, "essentially the story of a parent in search of a child in danger." Lopez said that his book mainly focused on "adult relationships".

== Characters ==
- Gabriel Santoro - Gabriel, the protagonist, is a 14-year old boy who runs away from home and deals drugs on the street. Ultimately Gabriel is good at heart, and hopes to pull away from a life of drugs and violence. In the novel Gabriel is half-Latino, half-European White. His mother, Ofelia, is half-Dominican and half-Canadian. His father, Ruben, was Cuban and Italian. In the play Gabriel was portrayed by Gueshill Gilman Wharwood, an African-American actor, and a fourth year student (senior) at the Philadelphia High School for Creative and Performing Arts (CAPA).
  - Carl Sessions Stepp, the senior editor of the American Journalism Review, wrote in a 1994 review that "Gabriel is a compelling and heartbreaking character, a talented artist abandoned by his father and overwhelmed by circumstances, yet prodigiously mature in certain ways." Brian O'Neill of the Pittsburgh Post-Gazette stated that he as a reviewer cared about Gabriel, the character. Ben Yagoda of The New York Times said that Gabriel "is depicted as honorable, steadfast and true -- and a prodigiously talented artist to boot." Yagoda asked "[w]hy would such a boy be willing to pocket the grocery money of teen-age mothers in exchange for crack?" Bob Nocek of Times Leader said that Wharwood "handled dutifully" making Gabriel a sympathetic character.
- Ofelia Santoro - Ofelia, Gabriel's mother, frantically looks for Gabriel. She is 40 years old. In the novel Ofelia is half-Latina, half-European White, as her father was Dominican and her mother was Canadian. In the play she was portrayed by Joilet Harris, an African-American actress.
  - Judith Wynne, a Somerville, Massachusetts writer who made a review of the book for The Baltimore Sun, said that the "depressed" Ofelia "is a handsome, urban earth mother who has psychic premonitions about Gabriel that she paints on her kitchen wall" and that "Lopez imbues her scenes with the melancholy, supernatural-tinged lyricism of a Toni Morrison novel."
- Eddie "Joe Pass" Passarelli - A South Philadelphia Italian American, 38-year-old Eddie loses his girlfriend, leaves a crumbling marriage, and finds that he has to pay a mobster named Thin Jimmy $10,000 U.S. dollars ($21722.05 according to inflation) since the truck, driven by Eddie, had a fire and burnt. Eddie is nicknamed "Joe Pass" as a reference to the musician Joe Pass. He suddenly moves out of his Roxborough house and moves into his mother's rental apartment in Kensington. Eddie becomes a father figure to Gabriel. At one point Eddie hears himself being compared to President of the United States Bill Clinton. The novel states that he "didn't necessarily take as a compliment, considering how gray and fat-faced the president was." Wynne said that the "manic" Eddie "seems to have dropped in from one of Elmore Leonard's low-life thrillers." O'Neill stated that Eddie becomes a "raging bull" at the end of the book. Paul L. Nolan played Eddie in the stage adaptation. Michael McCauley, the original actor for Eddie, dropped out of the production, and Nolan, originally cast as Lieutenant Bagno, replaced McCauley. Bob Nocek, in The Times Leader, stated that "The foolishness of Passarelli’s troubles [...] are a welcome break from" Gabriel's plot points.
- Father Laetner - A Roman Catholic priest from Pittsburg, California, Laetner is shocked by the neighborhood and helps Ofelia in her quest to find her son. O'Neill states that Laetner is "two dimensional" and that Lopez made Laetner "incongruously agnostic" since Laetner "acts heroically." O'Neill added that Laetner did not seem to have awareness of "Christ's predilection for the poor, the basis for the liberation theology movement within the Catholic Church." O'Neill said "There are Hallmark cards that go deeper than this guy. (Has any American novelist since Willa Cather given us a believable priest?)" Scott Greer played Laetner in the stage adaptation. Posner said that he considered making the Laetner character African-American or Latino in order to "find an appropriate racial balance within the cast." Posner said that he opted to retain Laetner as a white character because "Laetner behaves quite naively, which began to seem less than credible for an African American or Latino. Not that there aren't plenty of naive African Americans and Latinos, but Laetner's naive in that particular well-meaning white liberal way. For example, I could see myself behaving as Laetner does."
- Diablo - Diablo, an ugly drug kingpin, keeps Gabriel and the other gang members of the "Black Caps" under his thumb. O'Neill described Diablo as a "cardboard character straight from a Steven Seagal movie." Elvis O. Nolasco played Diablo in the stage adaptation.
- Marisol - Gabriel's girlfriend, Marisol attends night school and works at a restaurant during the day. In the play, Michelle Seabreeze, a senior at CAPA at the time, played Marisol.
- Lalo Camacho - Lalo, one of Gabriel's close friends, is in the Black Caps. Diablo fatally beats him. In the play, Ito Robles played Lalo.
- Ralph - Ralph, one of Gabriel's close friends, is in the Black Caps. Diablo asks him to kill Gabriel, and Ralph confronts Gabriel before committing suicide. On the stage Ralph was played by Ramon Aponte, a CAPA senior at the time.
- Mike Inverso - Inverso is the shady friend of Eddie who constantly insults Eddie. He creates the plan of stealing the mayor's ring in order to pay off Thin Jimmy and Diablo. John Lumia played Mike in the stage version. Daisy Fried of Philadelphia City Paper described Inverso as "bad-egg".
- Bill Bagno - Bagno is a police officer and a Vietnam War veteran. H. Michael Walls played Bagno in the stage version. Originally Paul Nolan was cast as Bagno, but he was recast as Eddie.
- Anthony Faggioli - The owner of the Faggioli Funeral Home, he helps Gabriel and Eddie steal the mayor's ring.
- Mayor DeMarco - The corrupt mayor who dies in the course of the novel. O'Neill compares DeMarco to Frank Rizzo.
- Sarah Lerner - Sarah is Eddie's girlfriend. She leaves him as the story progresses. Forty-three-year-old Sarah is 5 feet 11 inches (1.80 m) tall, has red hair and green eyes, and does not decorate her nails. Eddie likes the fact that she is Jewish as she is distanced from his community. A substitute teacher at Temple University, Sarah lives in an Old City apartment before moving into Eddie's apartment.
- Stella - Stella is Ofelia's coworker and friend. Jean Korey played Stella in the play version.
- Marie - Marie is Eddie's wife. She does not get along with him and feels betrayed when he leaves her. Jean Korey played Marie in the play version.
- Crew Chief - The chief of the Black Caps crew that Gabriel works for. In the play he is given a name, Gizmo, and was played by Kareem Diallo Carpenter. Daisy Fried of the Philadelphia City Paper said that the play Gizmo has "an important, comic-sinister relationship" with Gabriel.

O'Neill said that the central characters "redeemed" the novel despite that it had had some cliche minor characters. Stepp said that "Lopez specializes in paradox. His kids embody both ruthless bravado and baby-faced terror; the adults, both faith and despair. Villains are both monstrous and pathetic, wise-cracking street rogues and remorseless perverts." Yagoda argued that "[o]ne never shakes the feeling that" the "hard to credit" characters "are stand-ins for the author, notebook-wielding observers of a poor, crime-riddled neighborhood rather than real participants in its daily life" with Gabriel being the "worst" example. Toby Zinman of Philadelphia City Paper said that in the play version "the caricatures rather than characters pander to every prejudice in the audience; the Italians are ridiculous cartoons, the African Americans are either vicious or victims, and every crucial scene of emotional or moral crisis is broken by a laugh line, effectively trivializing the characters and their ordeals."

== Play adaptation ==
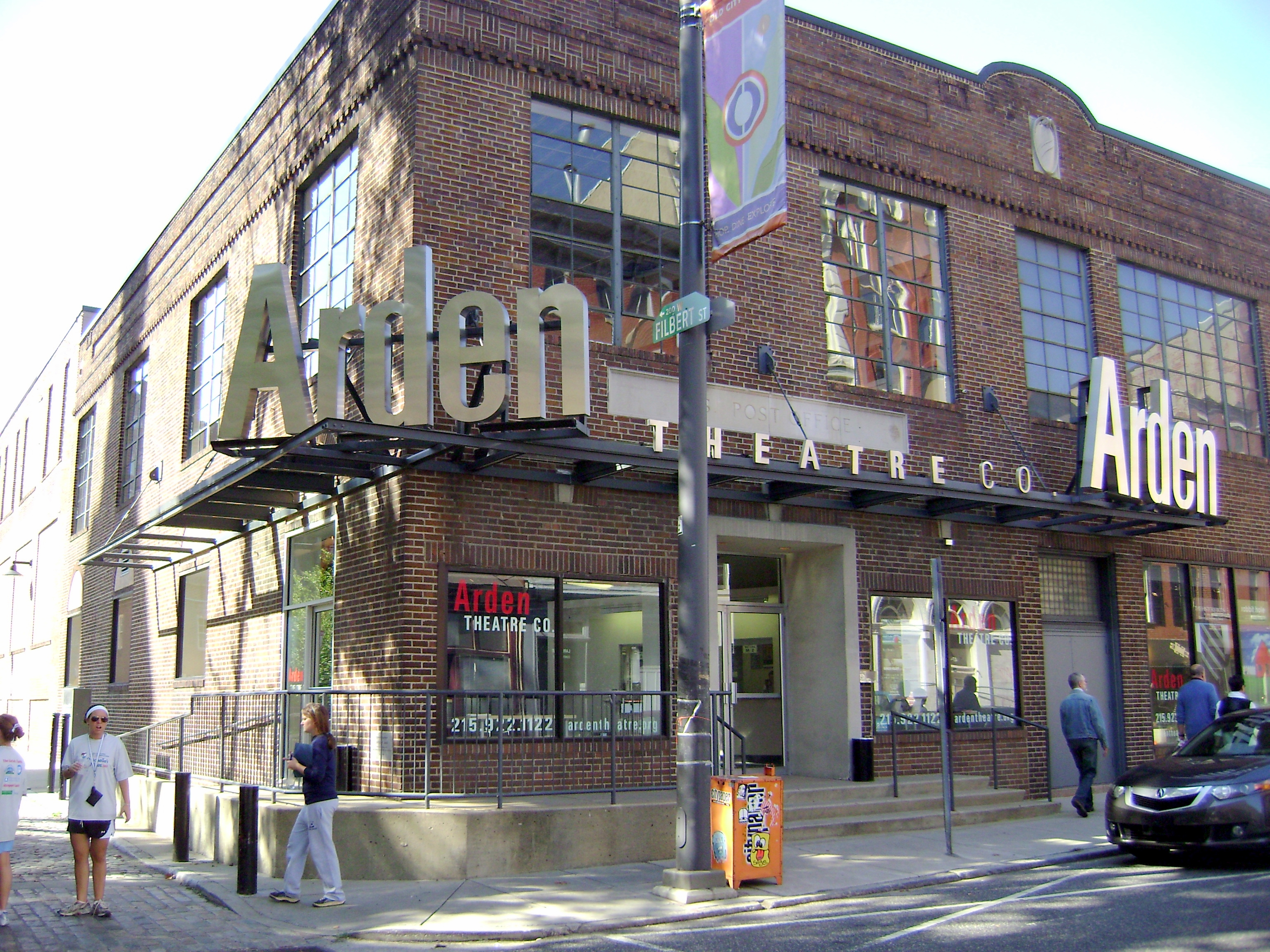
The play was performed at the Arcadia Stage of the Arden Theatre Company

The play adaptation of Third and Indiana was produced by the Arden Theatre Company in Philadelphia. The play ran from March 20 to May 4, 1997, at the Arcadia Stage, an Arden-operated theater in Old City, Philadelphia. The writer of the play, Aaron Posner, was the artistic director of the company. A teenager, Bernard Gray, assisted Posner with the street slang.

The play had 12 actors, original music, panel discussions of the issues discussed by the play and original novel, and video footage. Posner characterized the production as expensive and large. Posner said "It's been a huge project that's really consumed me. While it's Steve's situations, Steve's characters, and it's wholly recognizable as Third and Indiana [sic], the writing in the play is very much more original and different from the novel. It's much more like writing a new play than an adaptation." Steve Lopez said "I think something the play does that the book didn't do was to focus on kids" and that "Aaron has taken it down to a kid's perspective. As a result, there is more street language and street action, and I think that's probably a good thing."

Posner said that he decided to write the play after he heard a radio interview with Lopez and the responses; Posner recalled that "[o]ne caller would say it was brilliant, and another would say he [Lopez] didn't understand anything at all." After having read the novel, he decided that it would become his next project. Posner traveled to North Philadelphia to talk to community leaders and residents on several occasions while he was writing the play. In 1997 he said "I don't pretend to be anything but a total outsider in that neighborhood. I'm a somewhat more comfortable and somewhat more informed outsider now." Steve Lopez had no part in the play's production. According to Posner, he and Lopez met on several occasions while Posner was adapting the play. Posner offered for Lopez to be a consultant, but Lopez said that he had too many commitments at the time. Posner said that Lopez had a "supportive attitude" and told him "I wrote the novel; you write the play." Lopez said that Posner told him that the play would probably have a different focus on the novel. Posner did not restrict casting of Gabriel and Ofelia Santoro according to their races in the novel. He said "I concluded the story was universal enough that it wasn't hooked into the Latino experience. I looked for the best combination of actors I could find to play the kid and the mother." Ultimately two African-Americans were cast as those two characters.

== Plans for a film version ==
On one occasion staff members of Oprah Winfrey and Quincy Jones allied to option Third and Indiana for a film version; Oprah's group wanted a "happy ending." Oprah's option evaporated. Jones's found another group of investors who said they raised money for a film version and never executed any plans. In 2003 Tom Bradford, a then-35-year-old Center City resident, said that he would begin plans to make a film version of Third and Indiana.

== Reception ==
Judith Wynne said that Third and Indiana had often been compared to Clockers. Wynne said that "Mr. Lopez's book doesn't match ‘’Clockers ‘ panoramic scope or its intense preoccupation with the social forces that drive the illicit drug ‘executive’ and his sales crew of street kids. Nevertheless, ‘Third and Indiana’ packs a mean wallop on its own, more limited terms."

=== From reviewers ===
Carl Sessions Stepp of the American Journalism Review said that "The story alone is a true page-turner, but Lopez aims higher, and succeeds. This is a book that manages to be both cynical and tender, that somehow, artfully, conveys both hopelessness and eternal hope." Stepp described Third and Indiana as "touching, even haunting" and approved of the "balancing vision of human triumph." In a 1994 review Ben Yagoda of The New York Times said that "the novel is by no means a failure" but that it "flirts too recklessly with the outlandish and the hackneyed to be counted a success." The Fort Worth Star Telegram placed the book in "Best Books of 1994" list. Brian O'Neill of the Pittsburgh Post-Gazette said that Third and Indiana is "worth reading." Publishers Weekly said that in the "tough, compelling novel" the author "doesn't preach" and instead "with brutal honesty, he alternates scenes of despair with glimmerings of hope and, even when detailing matter-of-fact violence, he writes with compassion about those trapped in a world where men like Diablo make the rules and are the arbiters of life and death." Dwight Garner of the Washington Post argued that the misplaced "heart" or "profound sentimentality" means that Lopez "clogs its narrative arteries; the book is pretty much dead on arrival."

Wynne argues that the novel is "an angry, memorable testimony to 'young voices silenced, human futures wasted.'" Wynne said that Lopez "keeps most of the action rumbling efficiently along to its explosive conclusion" but that the subplot involving Ofelia and the priest was "half-hearted" and "lows down the pace without adding much to the story." O'Neill said that the novel had some "compelling" if "fantastic" plot twists, and while it does not have a "Hollywood" ending to "[Lopez's] credit" but that the novel also "sort of fades away." Stepp said that, through Gabriel, Eddie, and Diablo, Lopez "manages to juxtapose a thickly meditative study of evil with improbable subplots worthy of Elmore Leonard."

=== From residents of the Badlands ===
Steve Lopez said that the response from the residents of the Badlands was mostly positive. Lopez said that some from the area criticized him for writing the novel because he did not live there. Lopez argued that "I knew more about the neighborhood than most people who don't live there, and I wrote the book for those people. I decided if I tried to write this book from the inside out . . . I would be a fraud. What I did in the book was to bring outsiders into the neighborhood to view it with a fresh eye."

=== The play version ===
Bob Nocek of Times Leader said, regarding the play version, "What makes "Third and Indiana" work is that it's not afraid to show us that sometimes hope isn't enough." Toby Zinman of the City Paper liked the book version; in regards of the play version, which she reviewed, she said she felt like she "watched an afterschool special with bad language."
