= Kensington, Philadelphia =

Neighborhood in Pennsylvania, US

Kensington
- Neighborhood of Philadelphia
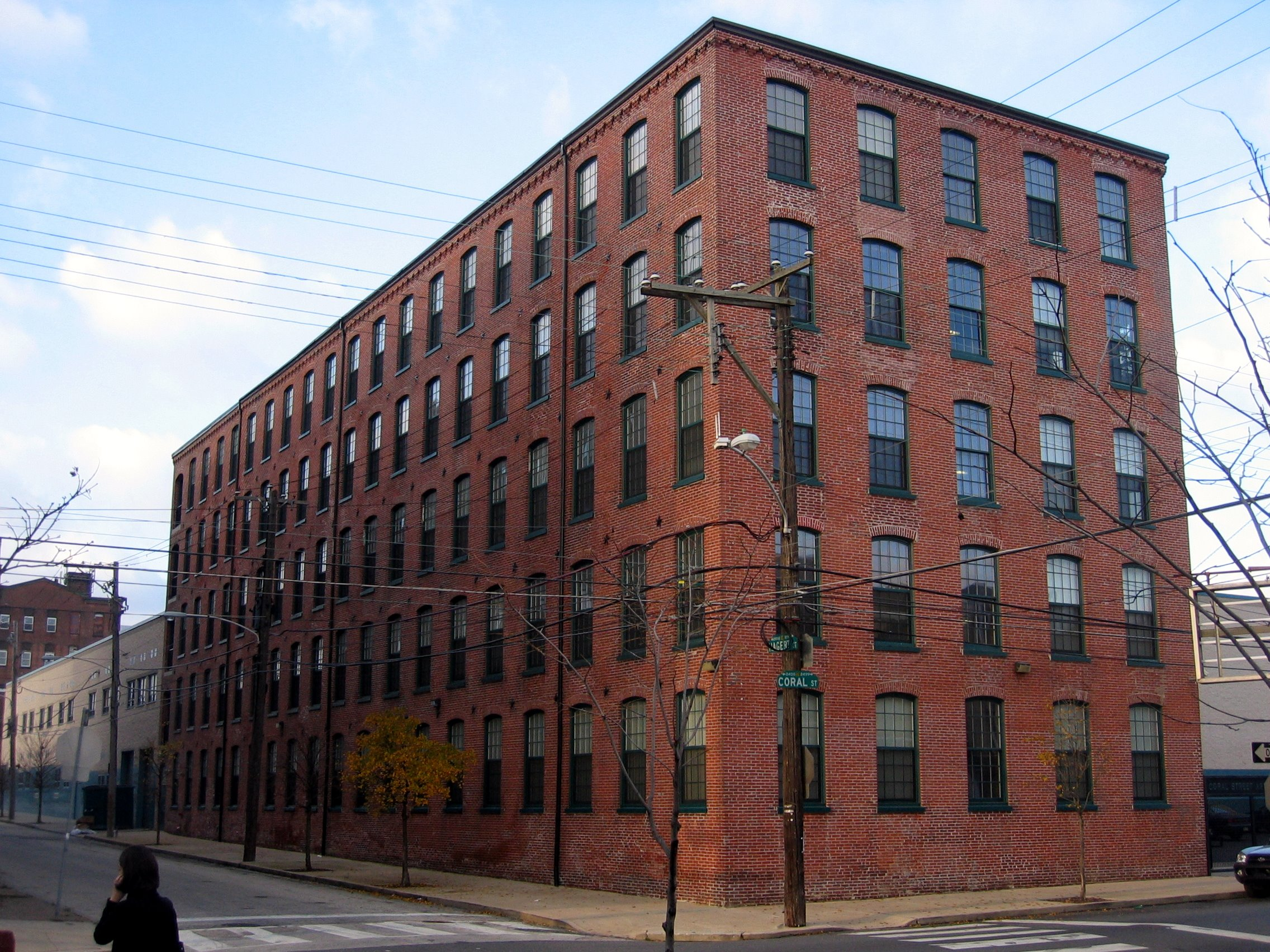
- Beatty's Mills Factory Building, a historic textile mill that is now the Coral Street Arts House, which provides artists with low-income housing
- Interactive map of Kensington
- Country: United States
- State: Pennsylvania
- County: Philadelphia
- City: Philadelphia
- Area codes: 215, 267, and 445

Kensington is a neighborhood in the River Wards section of Philadelphia. Kensington is a primarily low-income and working-class area, and it experienced increasing poverty after the loss of its industries in the 1960s during deindustrialization. Disinvestment and general neglect had led to high abandonment in some parts of the neighborhood, catalyzing several grassroots actions from its residents. Simultaneously, its lower portions have experienced significant gentrification in recent years.

Kensington traditionally is known for its large Irish Catholic and Irish American population, but is now home to a large population of Hispanic Americans, mainly Puerto Ricans and Dominicans, as well as African Americans. Communities of Polish Americans and Asian Americans also make up the neighborhood. Additionally, there is a large population of homeless individuals. Particularly south of Lehigh Avenue, the neighborhood also recently has seen a large influx of primarily white young urban professionals and gentrification, particularly in Fishtown – which is no longer considered to be part of Kensington – and in Olde Kensington, Norris Square, and East Kensington.

In recent years, Kensington is frequently associated with its open-air drug market. Today, the epicenter of the drug trade is near the intersection of Kensington and Allegheny avenues, which by 2020 housed a billion-dollar drug market with rampant open drug use and dealing on sidewalks and in public parks, particularly McPherson Square. Kensington's troubles with the drug trade have attracted national and even international news coverage. The drug trade has existed in Kensington since the 1970s, likely due to its many vacant factory buildings (convenient for drug storage, sale, and use), location several miles away from the concentration of institutions, residents, and workers in Center City, and easy access to the neighborhood via both the Market-Frankford Line and Interstate 95. In 2024, Mayor Cherelle Parker proposed a policy plan to address issues caused by the market, shifting spending and priorities away from harm reduction strategies and towards increased law enforcement, including more enforcement of low-level drug offenses.

Simultaneously, the lower part of the neighborhood (particularly below Lehigh Avenue) has become a hotspot for real-estate development and gentrification. The 19122 and 19125 ZIP codes, both of which include parts of Lower Kensington, are two of the top ZIP codes in Philadelphia for real estate development between 2021–2024, with new unit counts similar to the much more densely populated 19103 ZIP code in Center City Philadelphia. Recently, large developments have initiated north of Lehigh Avenue, in what is typically considered the heart of Kensington.

As with all neighborhoods in Philadelphia, the lack of any official designation means the boundaries of the area vary between sources over time and are disputed among locals. Sub-neighborhoods within Kensington include East (or Lower) Kensington, West Kensington, and Harrowgate. The adjacent Fairhill and Norris Square neighborhoods are more separate but may be included in Kensington; Fishtown and South (Olde) Kensington were historically included. The most conservative boundaries of the neighborhood are Front Street and 5th Street to the west, the Amtrak train tracks to the North, Trenton Avenue, the Trenton Avenue train tracks, and Frankford Avenue to the east, and Cecil B. Moore Avenue to the south.

== Geography ==
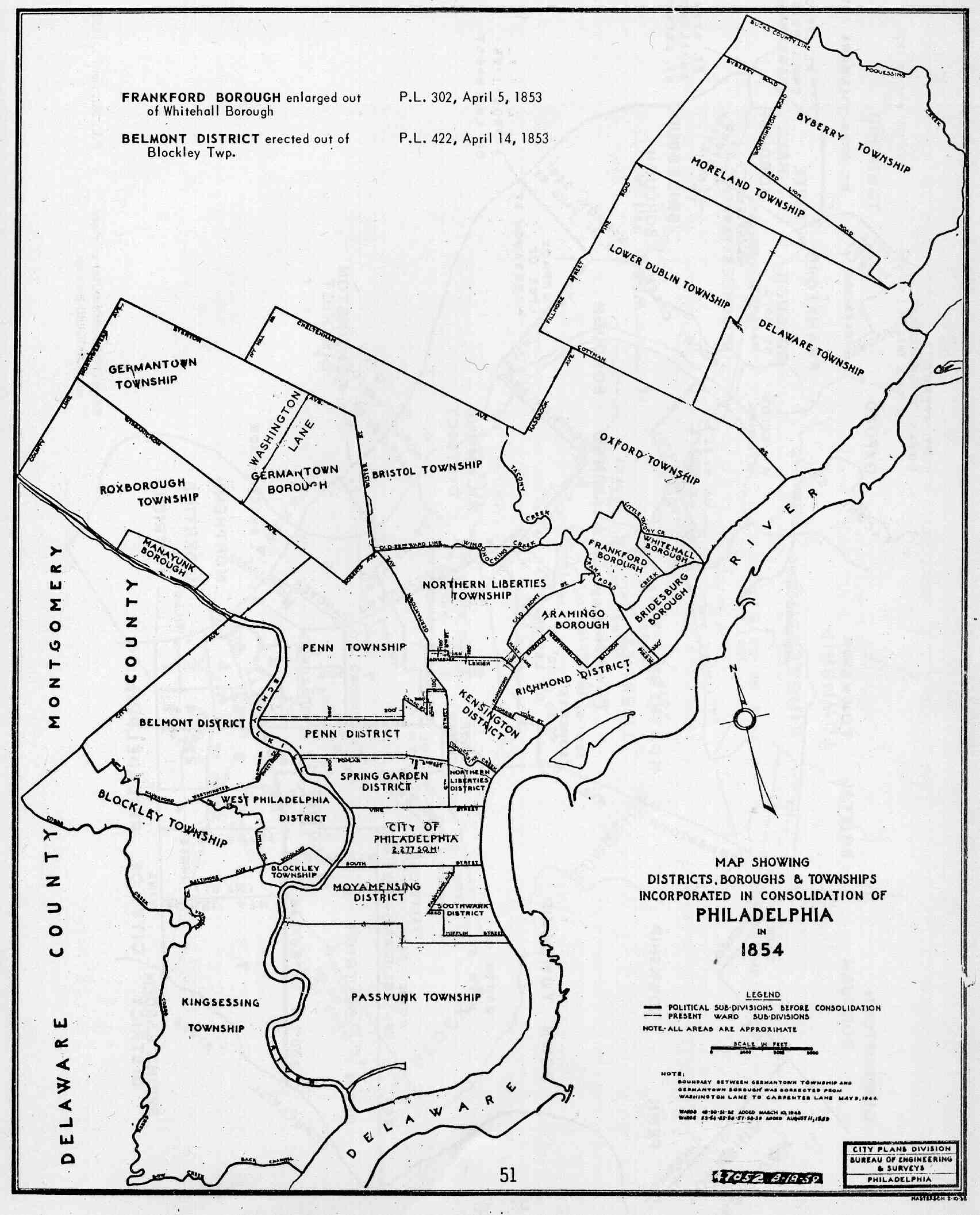
Map of Philadelphia County prior to consolidation, showing boundaries of Kensington District

As with all neighborhoods in the city, the lack of any official designation means the boundaries of the area vary between sources over time. Before the Act of Consolidation, 1854, the Kensington District was an independent municipality, which included portions of the neighborhoods known today as Olde Kensington, East Kensington, West Kensington, and Fishtown, with its northern border at Lehigh Avenue and its eastern boundary at Frankford Avenue. These boundaries have since shifted so that a large area north of Lehigh Avenue is now considered part of Kensington, while Fishtown is no longer considered part of the neighborhood. The current greater Kensington area roughly coincides with the former Kensington District, Richmond District, Aramingo Borough, and Northern Liberties Township.

The generally accepted boundaries of the neighborhood are Front Street and 5th Street to the West; the Amtrak train tracks to the North; Trenton Avenue, the Trenton Avenue train tracks, and Frankford Avenue to the East; and Cecil B. Moore Avenue to the South. More simply, some define Kensington as the triangular area bounded by Erie Avenue to the north, Front Street (and sometimes Fifth Street) to the West, and Trenton Avenue to the East.

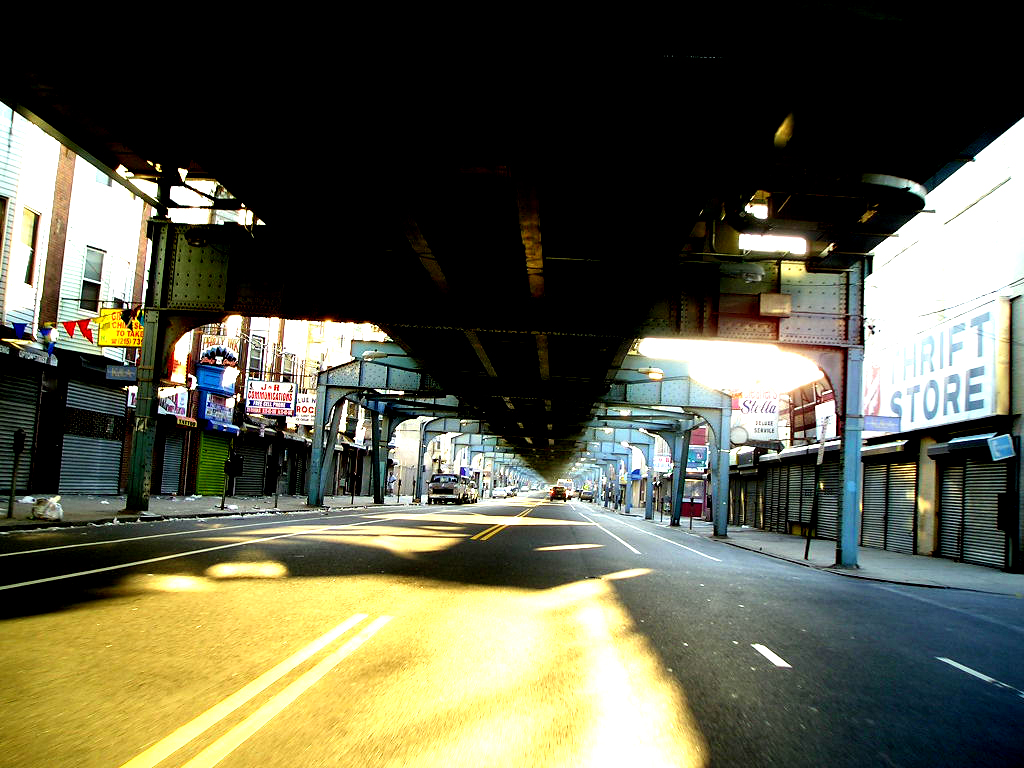
The Market–Frankford Line in Kensington

Kensington belongs to or divides Lower Northeast and North Philadelphia. It is part of the River Wards section of the city, a group of neighborhoods close to the Delaware River in North and Northeast Philadelphia. Kensington's river ward identity puts it in contrast with the neighborhoods to its west. Fairhill and Norris Square are separate from Kensington with a more central North Philadelphia identity; however, exactly where the neighborhoods separate is subject to much debate and there are people within both neighborhoods who identify with Kensington.

To the east of Kensington, Port Richmond and Olde Richmond are each predominantly white neighborhoods. Port Richmond has a historically Polish population but is becoming more mixed, and Olde Richmond, an area just north of Fishtown, is experiencing similar gentrification. Juniata, the neighborhood to the north, and Kensington are similar demographically, yet the former is slightly wealthier and has more green space.

=== Sections ===
Within Kensington, various sub-neighborhoods including Harrowgate, Lower Kensington, West Kensington. Central Kensington, or "the Heart of Kensington" as it is called in a recent Impact Services neighborhood plan, stretches along Kensington Avenue from Tusculum and Somerset Streets to Tioga Street (see Impact Services plan for a more accurate map). The area is known as the center of Kensington and was historically the commercial center of the neighborhood. The area is densely residential, but crime rates are highest in this part of Kensington. Harrowgate is the furthest north, bordering Juniata and named for Harrowgate Park.

The part of Kensington below Lehigh Street, or as it has been rebranded "Lower Kensington" or "East Kensington", is the part of Kensington most clearly experiencing gentrification. As it is just north of Fishtown, higher income residents have been moving further up, increasing property values and rents.

West Kensington is similar to Norris Square and Fairhill in that it has a similar demographic to most of Kensington while having a more North Central Philadelphia identity, but unlike the other two neighborhoods it remains certainly part of Kensington.

== History ==
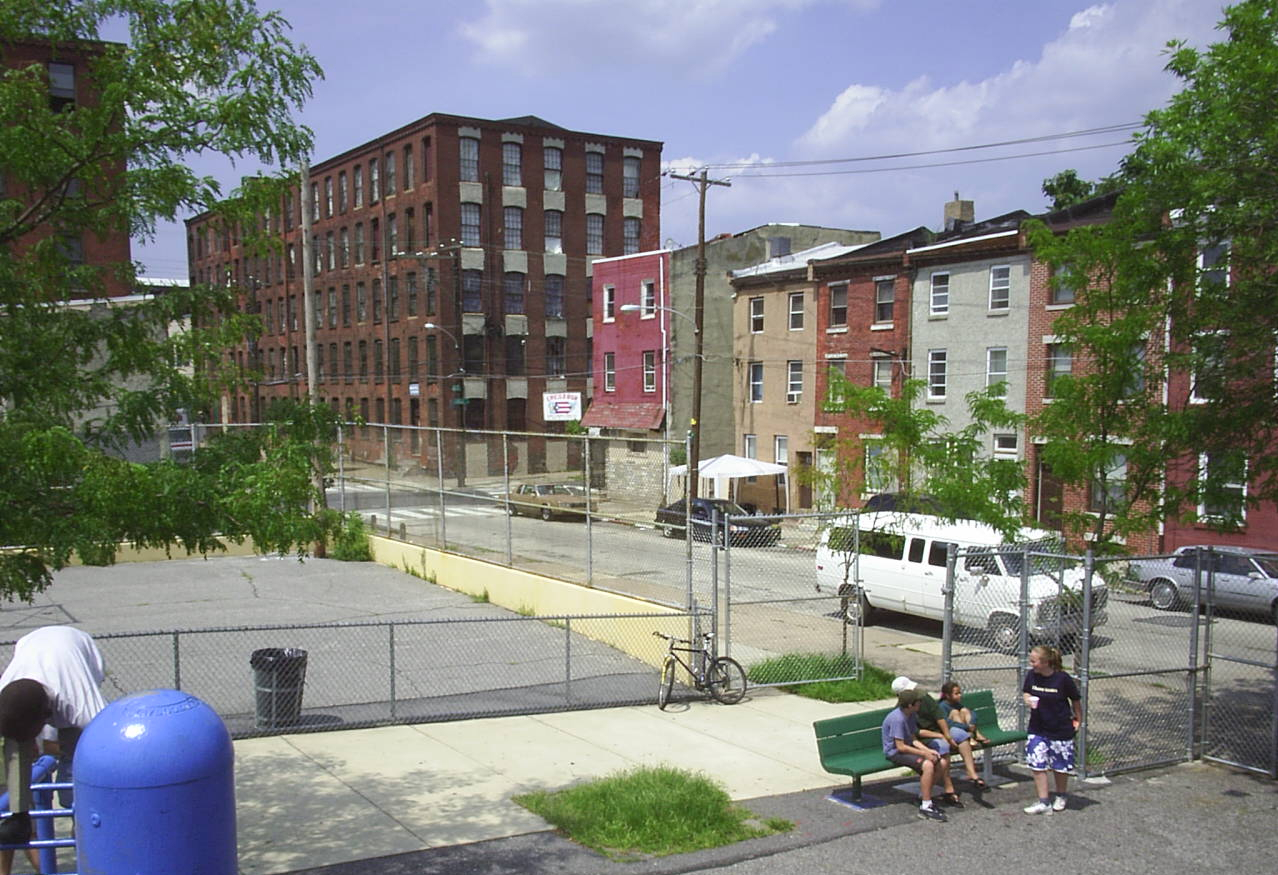
A playground in East Kensington and Beatty's Mills Factory Building in the background in April 2006

=== 18th century ===
Kensington was founded by Anthony Palmer in the early 1730s. Using proceeds from the sale of the Hope Farm estate (present day Port Richmond), which included three enslaved people named Abraham, Hannibal, and Phillis, Palmer purchased what was called the Fairman Estate, located along the Delaware River in the Northern Liberties Township (area just north of the City of Philadelphia on the Delaware River). The entire estate consisted of 191.5 acres of land, much smaller than the present-day Kensington area. Palmer was an English merchant who came to Philadelphia by 1704 from Barbados.

The town of Kensington was named for the area in London known as Kensington, which had been recently established as the residency of the British crown. Palmer laid out his town and sold parcels to many of the shipwrights and shipbuilders who were outgrowing their riverfront lots in present-day Old City, Southwark, and Society Hill areas. He also sold to recent German fishermen immigrants. The original area of Kensington is now more commonly called Fishtown, mainly because of the shad fishing that was one of the dominant businesses in Kensington in the 18th and 19th centuries.

=== 19th century ===
Kensington has traditionally been known as one of the working class centers of Philadelphia. Employment initially focused around the nearby waterfront and the activities of fishermen and ship- and boatbuilders. In the early 19th century, Kensington transitioned to iron and steel manufacturing and became home to a variety of factories, potteries, and machine works.

Kensington is also historically known for its large working class Irish Catholic community and was the site of the Philadelphia nativist riots in the 19th century. It was also the birthplace of the K&A Gang, currently known as the Northeast Philly Irish Mob, an Irish American organized crime network.

By the mid-19th century, Kensington became one of the leading centers of the textile industry, particularly in carpet. McNeil Laboratories began with the purchase of a pharmacy in the area in 1879 by the company's namesake.

=== 20th century ===
In 1903, Mother Jones organized a "Children's Crusade" of children from the local mills and mines to protest against child labor. They marched from Kensington to Oyster Bay, New York, carrying banners demanding, "We want to go to School and not the mines!"

Deindustrialization eventually took hold in the neighborhood in the 1950s, leading to a significant population loss, high unemployment, economic decline, an increase in crime, and numerous abandoned homes and businesses. However, some sections of the neighborhood have been revitalized in recent years, especially those near Frankford Avenue, Kensington's neighbor south of Lehigh Avenue, and Fishtown, another traditionally working class neighborhood which has seen rents increase. While most of the large manufacturers have left, the area has many small shops and large renovated factories and warehouses for newer artisans to set up shop.

=== National Register of Historic Places ===
Listed on the National Register of Historic Places:

- The 26th District Police and Patrol Station
- Beatty's Mills Factory Building
- H.W. Butterworth and Sons Company Building
- Kensington High School for Girls
- Philip H. Sheridan School

Philadelphia Register of Historic Places

- Clifton Mills, 1833 N. Howard Street, Kensington (1852–63).
- Clifton Mills, Building 4, 1809-11 N. Howard Street, Kensington (1852–63).
- The Columbia Works, 155-59 Cecil B. Moore Avenue, Kensington, Philadelphia, PA.
- The Decorating Plant of Gillinder & Sons' Franklin Flint Glass Works, 1700-06 N. Howard Street (1876).
- Frankford Avenue Baptist Church, 2347-49 Frankford Avenue, Kensington, Philadelphia, PA (1889).
- Harbisons' Dairies, 2041-55 Coral Street (1895). The Harbison Dairies is notable for its water tower, which stands on top of the industrial building in the form of a milk bottle. With development pressures in the neighborhood on the rise, the Harbison Dairies and its iconic milk bottle were threatened with demolition, which led neighbors to engage Oscar Beisert, Architectural Historian and Historic Preservationist, to draft a nomination to list the building in the Philadelphia Register of Historic Places, which was filed on June 7, 2016. Despite opposition from the property owner and claims of structural issues, Harbisons' Dairies was finally designated by the Philadelphia Historical Commission on January 12, 2018.
- Kensington Hospital for Women, 128-40 Diamond Street, Kensington, Philadelphia, PA.
- Peter Woll & Sons, Curled Hair & Bristles, 173 W. Berks Street, Kensington, Philadelphia, PA.
- Second Associate Presbyterian Church, 1523-25 N. Front Street, Kensington, Philadelphia, PA (1852–54).
- The Star Carpet Mills, 1801-03 N. Howard Street, Kensington (1880–82).
- Weisbrod & Hess' Loading Room, Condenser & Storage/Boiler & Wash House, 2117 E. York Street (1890–91).

== Demographics ==
Kensington has a population of approximately 42,000 people according to data from ASC 2020 survey. The majority of its population is Hispanic or Latino (59.9%), consisting primarily of Puerto Rican and Dominican Americans. Of the non-Hispanic or Latino population, 19% is White, 15.1% is Black or African American, 3.6% is Asian, and 2.2% identify as two or more races. The median yearly income of the neighborhood is $28,368, ranging from $18,516 to $77,979. Additionally, 65.8%, almost two thirds, of Kensington residents can be described financially as "poor or struggling" (defined by a Ratio of Income in 2020 to Poverty Level of under 2.00). The majority of the neighborhood is renter occupied, 55.6% overall, and up to 66.3% in one tract.

=== Gentrification ===
Kensington's high percentage of low income renters puts its residents at risk of displacement from gentrification. Significant rent increases are commonly triggered by increasing property values and a new wealthier demographic that can afford to pay higher rents. Such a phenomenon is happening across Kensington, causing long-term residents to be priced out. Looking to be close to Center City by both car and transit, young white collar workers have been moving to cheaper neighborhoods around downtown. SEPTA's Market–Frankford Line runs to Center City from Kensington, offering short commute times. Fishtown, formerly a small subsection of Kensington, has transformed with a new affluent population, as well as greater investments from real estate developers.

== Parks and gardens ==
Kensington has several medium and small sized parks and playgrounds which offer a variety of uses for visitors. Parks in and adjacent to the neighborhood include Harrowgate Park, McPherson Square, Hope Park, Fairhill Square Park, Norris Square Park, Mascher Park, Frankford Avenue Garden, Arcadia Commons, Trenton and Auburn Park, Letterly Green, Emerald Park, Konrad Square, and Palmer Park. Kensington has many playgrounds within or adjacent to its boundaries including Nelson Playground, Waterloo Playground, Hissey Playground, McPherson Square Playground, Heitzman Recreation Center, McKinley Playground / McVeigh Recreation Center, Scanlon Playground and Ice Rink, Harrowgate Park Playground, Fairhill Square Park Playground, Eric Casiano Field, Mascher Park / Maguire Playground, Black Coyle and McBride Playground, Pop's Playground, Pop's Skatepark, Hagert Street Playground, Shissler Recreation Center, and Towey Playground.

Strong community groups and nonprofits in Kensington have used the neighborhood's empty lots as an opportunity to create community garden spaces. Community garden spaces in and around the neighborhood include Kensington Corridor Trust Community Garden, NKCDC Garden, Las Parcelas – Norris Square, El Batey – Norris Square, Collins Smith Barrick Play Garden, Emerald Street Community Farm, Rainbow Park, House of Grace Community Garden, Port Kensington, Hart Lane Farm, and Circle of Hope / Frankford Ave Garden.

== Activism ==
=== Protests ===
==== Somerset Station SEPTA closure ====
On March 21, 2021, SEPTA indefinitely closed the Somerset Station of the Market-Frankford Line (MFL). The closure, which happened without consulting with residents and lacked advance notice, was ostensibly to repair elevators that had been damaged by human waste and trash and concerns about safety for workers. However, the decision to close the station "indefinitely" led hundreds of Kensington residents to march from Somerset Station to Allegheny Station in protest, recreating the longer trip many of them had to take to access the MFL since the closure. Protestors demanded a clear reopening date for the station, safer conditions for SEPTA workers, addiction services, services for homeless people in the area, and more. The station was reopened on April 5 with increased police presence.

==== Safehouse supervised injection site ====
The proposal to open a supervised injection site in Kensington has faced backlash from residents, despite the area's prevalent public drug use. Safehouse, a nonprofit founded in 2018 with the purpose of opening the first supervised injection site in the country, sought a location in Kensington after their proposed South Philly location ran into opposition from neighbors of the site. In the neighborhood, some residents have opposed the plans and organized against the site being located in Kensington, including leaders of five civic organizations in the area. However, some residents and many harm reduction advocates in the area are supportive.

=== Community development ===
==== Neighborhood trusts ====
- Kensington Corridor Trust (KCT) – utilizes a neighborhood trust model consisting of a 501(c)(3) nonprofit and a perpetual purpose trust which are each governed by a different board of community members in order to combat disinvestment and gentrification. KCT focuses on de-commodifying and reactivating residential and mixed-use properties along the Kensington Avenue commercial corridor to preserve culture and affordability while building intergenerational neighborhood power and wealth in Kensington. It aims to use its unique model to ensure long-term neighborhood ownership and control of the corridor.

==== Community development corporations ====
Kensington is home to a number of community development corporations working to improve housing conditions and economic activity in the neighborhood:

- Impact Services – covers a wide range of services and development projects including re-entry services, career development services, affordable housing development (especially for veterans), and community outreach and development. Impact also acts as a community development financial institution.
- HACE – focuses primarily on residential and commercial real estate development as well as housing and small business services.
- New Kensington CDC – combines real estate development, community engagement, and direct services in an effort to prevent displacement and create wealth for residents.

==== Health organizations ====
- Prevention Point Philadelphia, a public health organization providing harm reduction services to Philadelphia and surrounding areas.
- Esperanza Health Center, a federally qualified health center located at Kensington and Allegheny providing affordable, bilingual healthcare and wellness services.

==== Religious organizations ====
- Rock Ministries, founded in 2003 by Buddy Osborn located under the El tracks on Kensington Avenue, provides support for addicts and those in need including free boxing lessons for children provided they attend short bible study
- The Blessed Sarnelli Community (BSC) is a Catholic, Christian, non-profit mission dedicated to providing for the needs of the poor, homeless, and abandoned in the Kensington Community. Blessed Sarnelli serves hot meals 5 days a week (M-F) to anyone in need. BSC also operates a clothing room open during Tues. Wed. and Thurs. meals. https://www.bscphilly.org/

==== Civic associations ====
- Somerset Neighbors for Better Living
- Harrowgate Civic Association
- Kensington Independent Civic Association
- Kensington Neighborhood Association
- Olde Richmond Civic Association
- South Port Richmond Civic Association
- East Kensington Neighbors Association

== Government and infrastructure ==
=== Political representation ===
Kensington is represented on the Philadelphia's City Council by Districts 1 and 7. As of 2024, Mark Squilla is the Councilmember for District 1 and Quetcy Lozada is the Councilmember for District 7.

Kensington mostly lies under the 180th State Representative District, being represented by Jose Giral. Parts of the neighborhood lie in the 177th or 197th Districts, represented by Joseph C. Hohenstein and Danilo Burgos respectively.

=== Post office ===
The United States Post Office operates the Kensington Post Office at 1602 Frankford Ave. The U.S. Postal Service designates Kensington as ZIP codes 19125 (Kensington Station). The U.S. Postal service considers 19134 (Richmond Station) as the area known as Port Richmond. Adjacent neighborhoods are Northern Liberties (ZIP code 19123), Fishtown and Olde Richmond (ZIP code 19125), Port Richmond (ZIP code 19134).

=== Transit and infrastructure ===
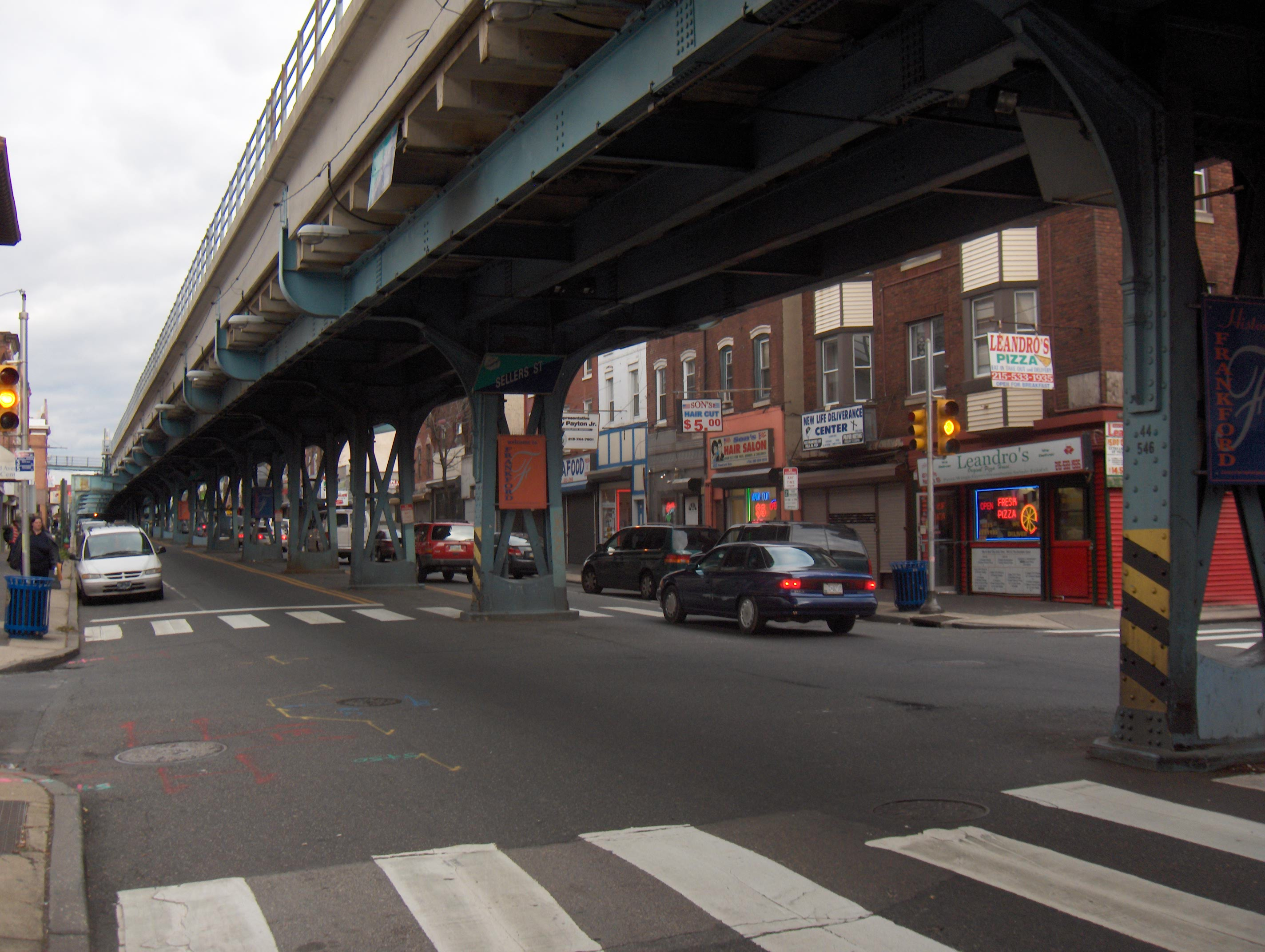
The Market–Frankford Line in Kensington

The intersection of Kensington and Allegheny Avenues, commonly referred to by Philadelphians as "K & A", is a major transportation and retail hub in the Kensington neighborhood, as it is served by the Frankford Elevated portion of the Market–Frankford Line which, running on top of Kensington Avenue, dominates the intersection. SEPTA City Bus routes 3 (on Kensington Avenue, running underneath the "El") and 60 on Allegheny Avenue, with route 5 nearby on Frankford Avenue, also serve the K & A area.

== Education ==
=== Primary and secondary schools ===
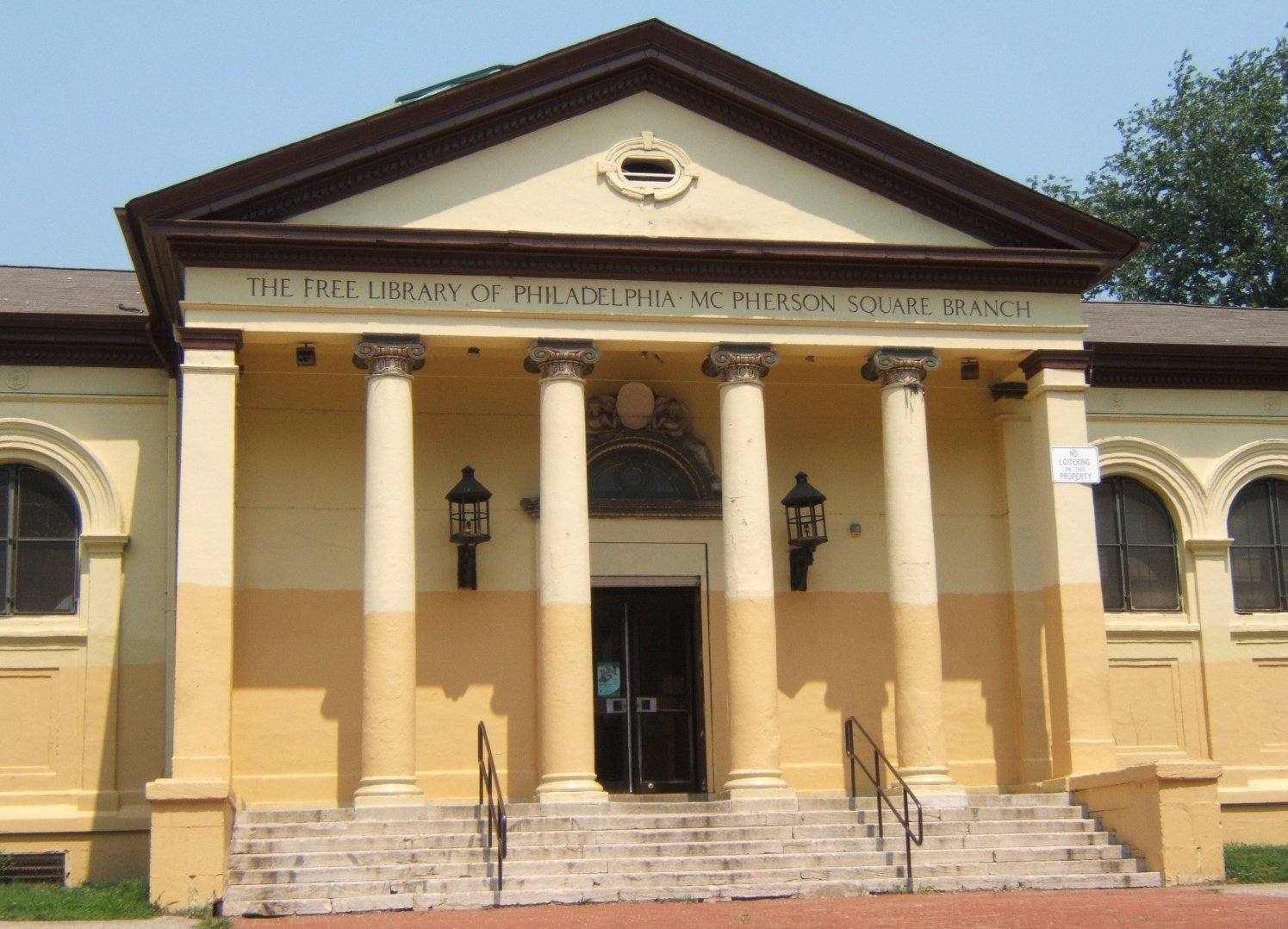
The McPherson Square Branch of the Free Library of Philadelphia

The School District of Philadelphia operates public schools. Public schools in Kensington include Kensington High School Complex, Jules E. Mastbaum Vocational Technical High School, Russell H. Conwell Middle Magnet School and John H. Webster Elementary School. There is also a charter school, Sankofa Freedom Academy Charter School.

In 2011, the Roman Catholic Archdiocese of Philadelphia announced the closures of three Kensington Catholic schools, in response to declining student enrollment: Ascension of Our Lord, St. Anne, and St. Hugh of Cluny.

=== Public libraries ===
The Free Library of Philadelphia operates the McPherson Square Branch at 601 East Indiana Avenue, and the Kensington Branch at 104 W Dauphin Street.

== Crime and gang activity ==
Kensington was the birthplace of the K&A Gang, an Irish American organized crime outfit that controlled the distribution of methamphetamine in the 1980s. Economic decline led to a rapid expansion of the drug trade and an increased number of black and Hispanic dealers and gang members, who sold heroin, fentanyl, and crack cocaine.

In recent years, Kensington has experienced increasing social issues primarily related to drug abuse. Sections of the neighborhood are frequented by a significant number of people facing drug addictions and homelessness. After Philadelphia Police forcibly removed a large encampment of these people from an abandoned railroad track by Lehigh Avenue, several smaller encampments formed under the tracks. Police, after a year and a half, removed these encampments causing its residents to spread up Kensington Avenue. People suffering from addiction and/or experiencing homelessness concentrate around the Somerset and Allegheny train stations, in nearby parks, and on residential streets, angering long-term residents.

The neighborhood gained national attention, notoriety, and extensive press coverage of its thriving narcotics drug scene, often described as the largest on the U.S. East Coast. The intersection of Kensington Avenue and Somerset Street was listed as the city's top recreational drug corner in a September 2012 article by Philadelphia Weekly reporter Steve Volk. This area of Kensington is also known as a central area for prostitution in the city. An August 2011 article on the area in The Daily Beast in January 2019 was titled, "Philadelphia's Kensington Avenue: Heroin, Prostitution, and No Police".

== Notable people ==
- Eddie Alvarez, mixed martial artist
- Richard Binder (1839–1912), medal of honor recipient
- Samuel B. Booth, rector of St. Luke's Church and bishop of the Episcopal Diocese of Vermont
- Frank Cappuccino, former boxing referee and amateur boxer
- Shane Claiborne, founding member, The Simple Way religious group
- Emanual Davis, former professional basketball player, Atlanta Hawks, Houston Rockets, and Seattle SuperSonics
- Jehu Eyre, Revolutionary War shipbuilder
- Edwin Henry Fitler, former mayor of Philadelphia
- William J. Green III, former mayor of Philadelphia
- Drew Gulak, professional wrestler
- Joseph Hallman, composer
- John Hewson, textile producer
- Amos Lee, singer-songwriter
- Roberto Lugo, artist
- Jonathan Maberry, author
- Benny McLaughlin, soccer player
- Bob McNeill, basketball player
- Jamie Moffett, filmmaker
- Eddie Stanky, baseball player
- John J. Taylor, politician
- Skrilla, Rapper
- Nelson Erazo, professional wrestler known as Homicide
- Domenic Palermo, singer of Philadelphia Shoegaze band Nothing.

== See also ==
- Kensington Renewal Initiative
- Long Bright River – 2025 crime drama limited series set in Kensington
