= Harrowgate, Philadelphia =

Harrowgate
- Neighborhood of Philadelphia
- Location within Philadelphia
- Country: United States
- State: Pennsylvania
- County: Philadelphia County
- City: Philadelphia
- Area codes: 215, 267, and 445

Harrowgate is a neighborhood in the River Wards section of Philadelphia, Pennsylvania, United States, located immediately northeast of Kensington adjacent to Kensington Avenue. It is bordered by Feltonville, Juniata and Frankford to the north, Fairhill to the west, West Kensington and Kensington to the south, and Port Richmond and Bridesburg to the east.

== History ==
Harrowgate was founded in 1784 by Capt. George Esterly, a Revolutionary War veteran, when he discovered springs in the vicinity of what is now Kensington Ave. and Tioga St., now the site of Harrowgate Square, a park covering one city block. The spring water was pronounced healthful by Dr. Benjamin Rush, and Esterly established a spa there, with gardens, overnight accommodations, food and drink, occasional concerts, and coach service from Second and Market Sts. in Philadelphia. The name was copied from the spa town of Harrogate in England. The spring dried up about 1800, but the town flourished.

Nearby was Cedar Grove, country estate of the Paschall and Morris families. The first section of the modest mansion was built in 1746. The Morris family donated the house to the city in 1926, and it was moved, stone by stone, with much of the original furniture, to west Fairmount Park, where it is open to the public.

Historically, Harrowgate was a working-class community whose residents could trace their ancestry to England, Scotland, Ireland, and Wales.

== Demographics ==
As of the 2010 Census, Harrowgate was 48.5% Hispanic, 34.5% non Hispanic white, 10% black, 4.1% Asian, and 2.9% all other. Today, Harrowgate is primarily a low-income neighborhood largely populated by Puerto Ricans but also has significant Polish, Irish, Dominican, African American, and West Indian populations.

The neighborhood currently has rapidly growing Hispanic and black populations, and a declining white population. It is also divided by Kensington Avenue, with the area southeast of Kensington going towards Aramingo Avenue being predominantly white, with growing Hispanic and Black populations, and the area northwest of Kensington going towards Front Street being almost entirely populated by Hispanics and to a lesser extent Blacks.

== See also ==
- Harrogate, England, namesake of this neighborhood
