= William Adamson School =

- U.S. National Register of Historic Places
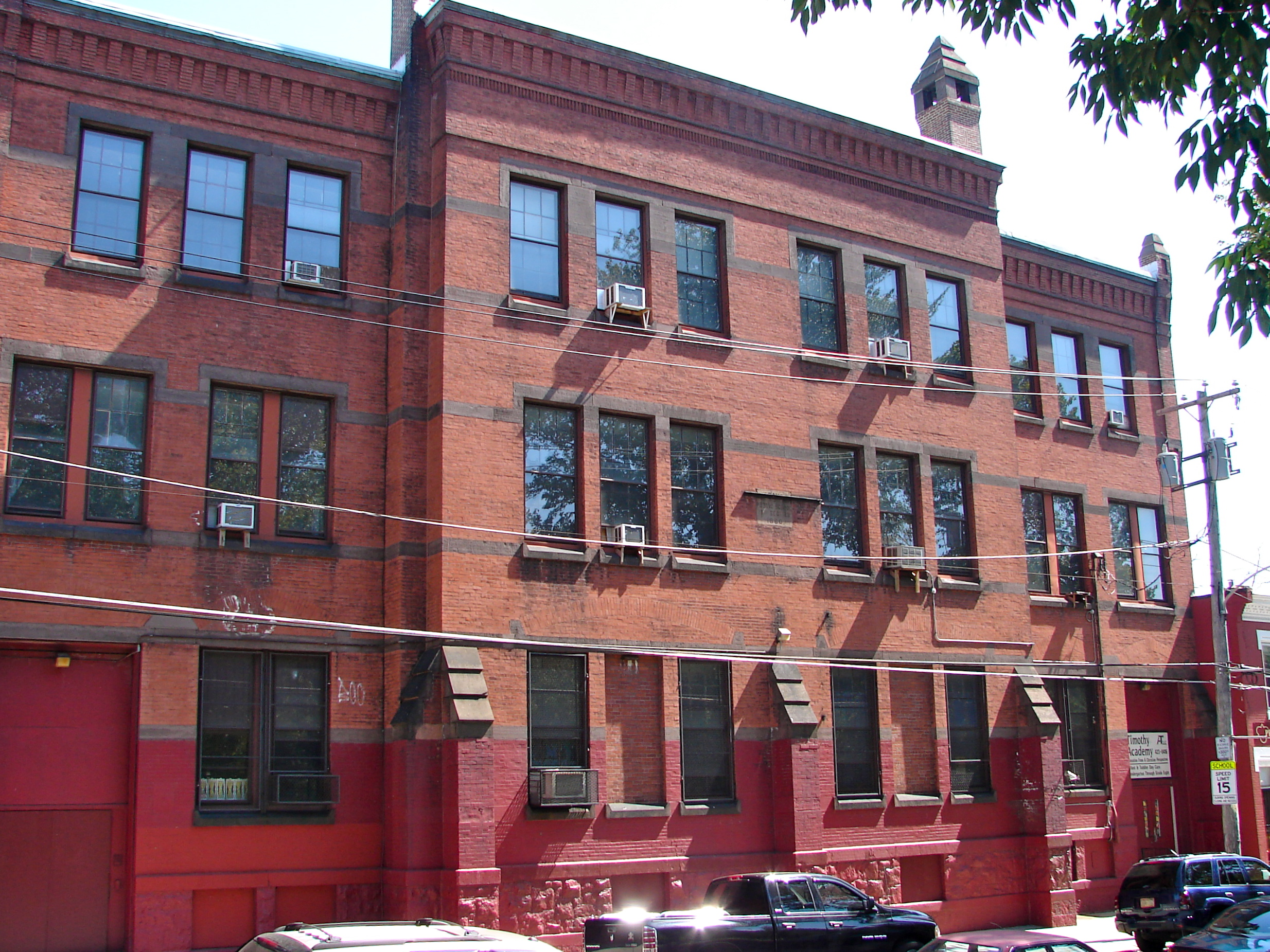
- William Adamson School, September 2010

- Location within Philadelphia Location within Pennsylvania Location within the United States
- Location: 2637-2647 N. 4th St., Philadelphia, Pennsylvania
- Coordinates: 39°59′27″N 75°8′18″W
- Area: less than one acre
- Built: 1879-1880
- Built by: Somerset, Philip H.
- Architect: Hutton, Addison
- Architectural style: Queen Anne
- MPS: Philadelphia Public Schools TR
- NRHP reference No.: 88002224
- Added to NRHP: November 18, 1988

The William Adamson School is an historic school building in the West Kensington neighborhood of Philadelphia, Pennsylvania, United States.

It was added to the National Register of Historic Places in 1988.

== History and architectural features ==
Designed by Addison Hutton and built between 1879 and 1880, this historic school is a three-story, four-bay, brick building that sits on a stone basement. Created in the Queen Anne style it has two central bays that slightly project and features brownstone sills and lintels and brick piers with brownstone tops.
