= Feltonville, Philadelphia =

Feltonville
- Neighborhood of Philadelphia
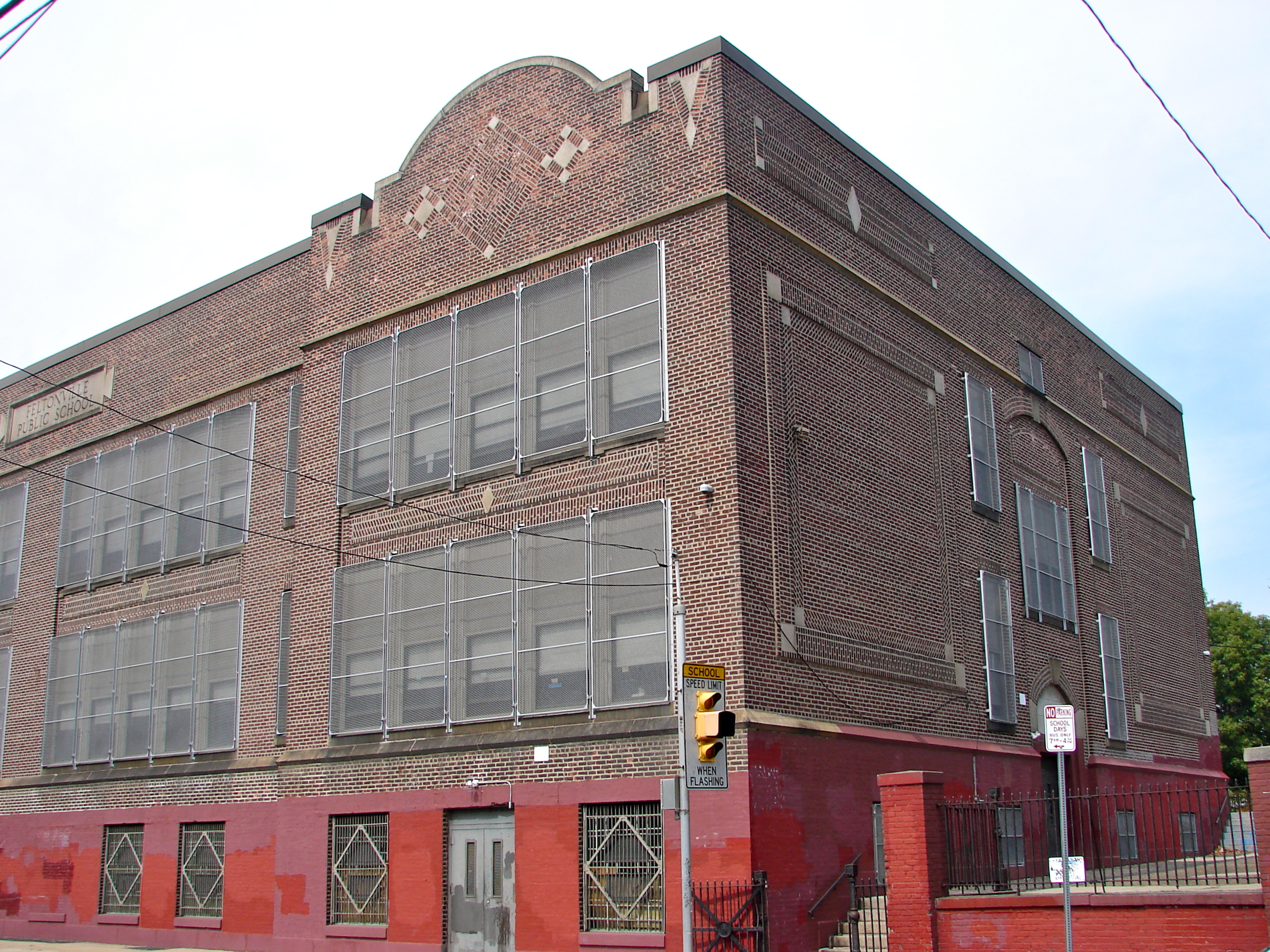
- Feltonville School, September 2010

- Location within Philadelphia
- Country: United States
- State: Pennsylvania
- County: Philadelphia
- City: Philadelphia
- Area codes: 215, 267, and 445

Feltonville is a working-class neighborhood in North Philadelphia, Pennsylvania, United States. It is located east of Logan and Hunting Park, west of Lawncrest and Juniata, south of Olney, and north of Fairhill and Harrowgate. Feltonville is bounded by Erie Avenue to the south, Front Street to the west, Roosevelt Boulevard to the north, Tacony Creek to the northeast, and G Street to the east. It encompasses the extinct neighborhood of Rowlandville.

== History ==
Feltonville was known circa 1890 as "Wyoming Villa" or "Wyoming Valley." In 1927, the City of Philadelphia set aside a corner of the recreation field at "B" St. and Wyoming Ave. for the building of the Wyoming Branch of the Free Library of Philadelphia. Completed in 1930, this branch has the distinction of being the last Carnegie library built with funds provided by the noted philanthropist Andrew Carnegie. The neighborhood was named after the wealthy Felton family.

Early residents noted Feltonville for its high ground, beautiful rolling farms, and many gracious homes. Before 1900, as a suburb of Philadelphia, public transportation was limited to the Reading Railroad's train from 3rd and Berks Streets to Newtown. The station was located at 2nd Street and Wyoming Avenue, on the northwest boundary of a 23-acre (93,000 m^{2}) farm. A local historian, Edna Walmsley Hookway, described what the scene would have looked like in 1891:

Across from the station, on Wyoming Avenue, stood the Rau mansion built in 1888. Mr. David Titlow, the undertaker, lived in a stately home with a lake in front of it at Wyoming Avenue and "C" Street. Across Wyoming Avenue on the north side stood the large residences of Mr. Edwin P. Frick and Mr. Thomas Harvey, side by side.

On old Second Street Pike, now named Rising Sun Avenue, and Fisher's Lane stood the Feltonville School, having twelve grades, all taught by one teacher. Some of the classes had only five or six pupils. Several branches of the Felton family, for whom the community was named, resided on Fisher's Lane, the present "D" Street, which extended all through the community. It ran north and south, turned westward at what is now the Roosevelt Boulevard, bounding the twenty-eight-acre farm of Mr. John Hoffner. Mr. Hoffner was a relative of the Felton family. Mr. Christopher Simon was also a Felton.

A visitor arriving on the Reading train was greeted by the bright, bold sign "Wyoming" hanging on the station. On old Second Street Pike was a picturcsque property occupied by Mr. James Eckersley. On the lawn, "Wyoming Villa" was written in brilliant red plants.

A newly formed real estate company named "Wyoming Land and Improvement Association," and headed by Mr. Eckersley, employed Mr. John Walmsley to divide the fields into building lots. Mr. Walmsley brought his wife and five children to reside on Second Street Pike in the first new house built by the Wyoming Land Company.

Feltonville School No. 2 was added to the National Register of Historic Places in 1988.

== Demographics ==
As of the 2010 Census, Feltonville was 42.8% Hispanic, 29.7% African American, 14.1% white, 9.4% Asian, and 4% mixed and all other. Although a large portion of Feltonville's population is made up of middle class Puerto Ricans, Dominicans, and African Americans. Feltonville is a very diverse middle-class neighborhood, with significant populations of Korean Americans, Cambodian Americans, Trinidadian Americans, Haitian Americans, Jamaican Americans, Colombian Americans, Salvadoran Americans, Honduran Americans, Guatemalan Americans, Mexican Americans and other immigrants, including a large concentration of Palestinian Americans.
