= Francis Hopkinson School =

- U.S. National Register of Historic Places
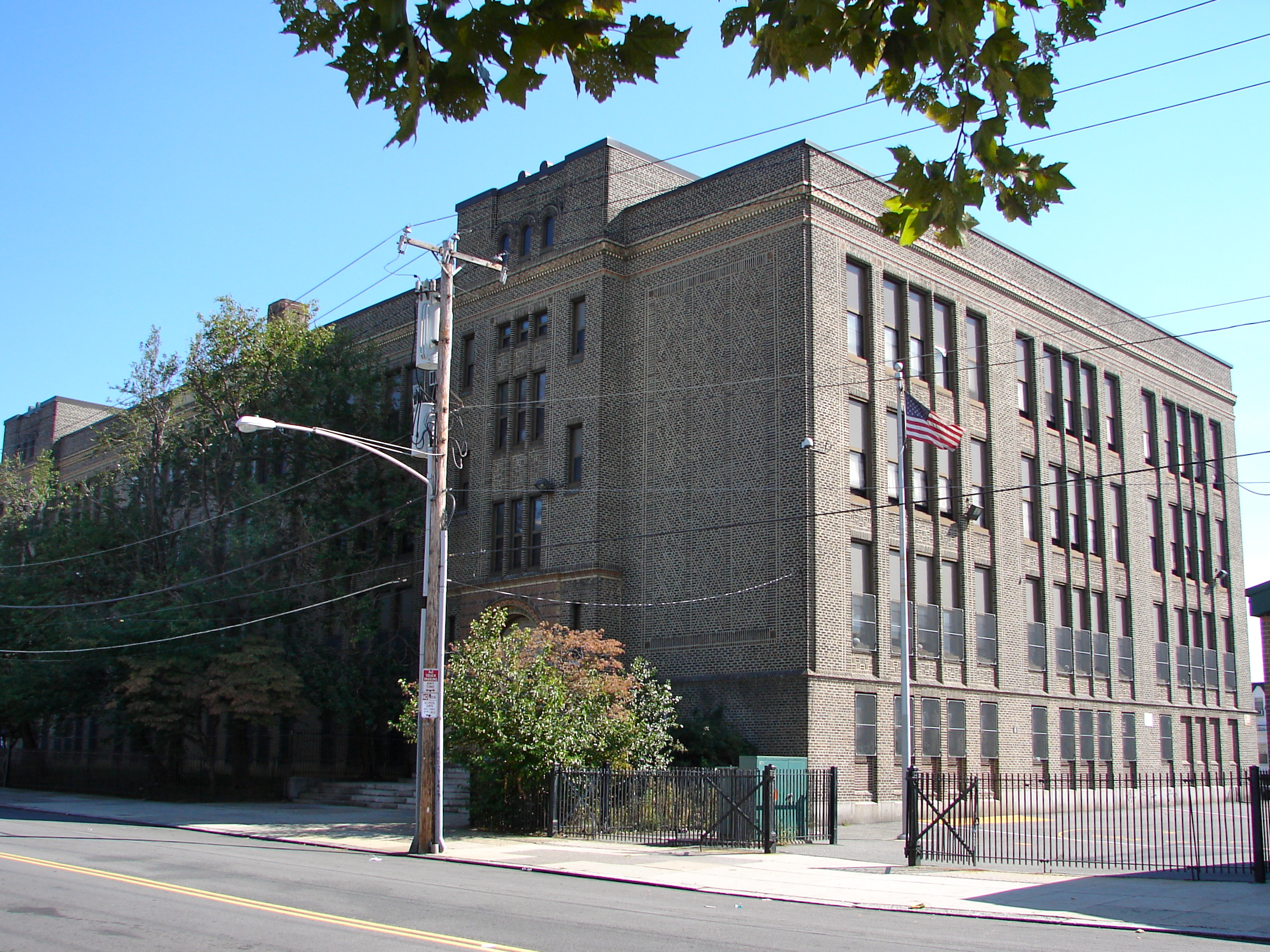
- Francis Hopkinson, September 2010

- Location within Philadelphia Location within Pennsylvania Location within the United States
- Location: 1301-1331 E. Luzerne Ave., Philadelphia, Pennsylvania
- Coordinates: 40°00′30″N 75°06′08″W
- Area: 2 acres (0.81 ha)
- Built: 1926–1927
- Architect: Irwin T. Catharine
- Architectural style: Art Deco
- MPS: Philadelphia Public Schools TR
- NRHP reference No.: 88002282
- Added to NRHP: November 18, 1988

Francis Hopkinson School is a historic elementary school located in the Juniata neighborhood of Philadelphia, Pennsylvania. It is part of the School District of Philadelphia. The building was designed by Irwin T. Catharine and built in 1926–1927. It is a three-story, eight-bay, yellow brick building on a raised basement in the Art Deco style. It features an arched entryway with terra cotta trim and pilasters, a terra cotta cornice, and brick parapet. The school is named for Francis Hopkinson.

The building was added to the National Register of Historic Places in 1988.
