= David Farragut School (Philadelphia, Pennsylvania) =

- U.S. National Register of Historic Places
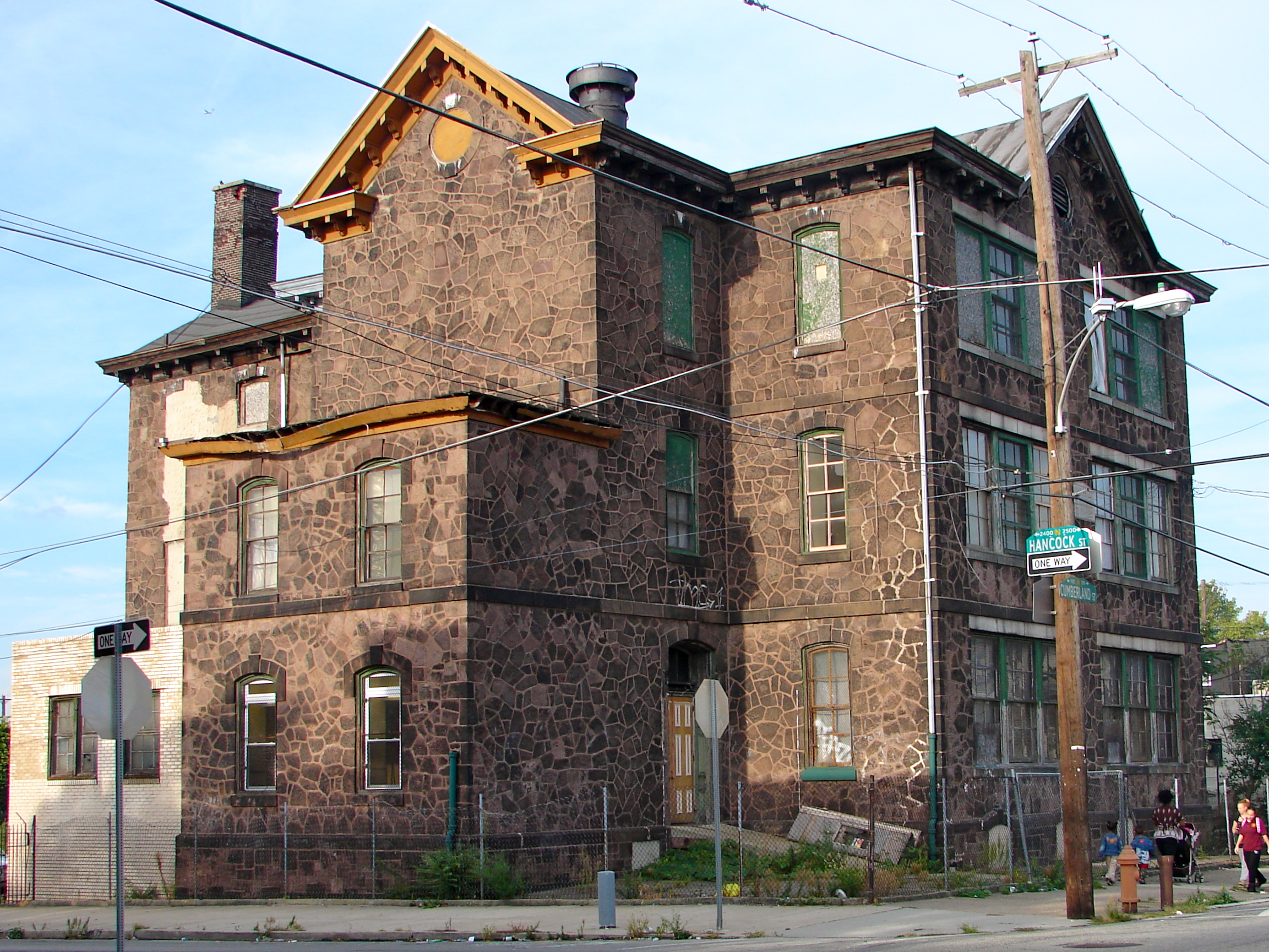
- David Farragut School, September 2010

- Location within Philadelphia Location within Pennsylvania Location within the United States
- Location: 170 W. Cumberland St., Philadelphia, Pennsylvania
- Coordinates: 39.9880°N 75.1348°W
- Area: less than one acre
- Built: 1873
- Architect: Louis Esler
- Architectural style: Italianate
- MPS: Philadelphia Public Schools TR
- NRHP reference No.: 86003280
- Added to NRHP: December 4, 1986

David Farragut School is a historic school building located in the West Kensington neighborhood of Philadelphia, Pennsylvania. It was built in 1873 and is a three-story, four-bay, stone building in the Italianate-style. An addition was built in 1915. It features brownstone and limestone trim. It was named for Admiral David Farragut (1801–1870).

It was added to the National Register of Historic Places in 1986.
