= Beatty's Mills Factory Building =

- U.S. National Register of Historic Places
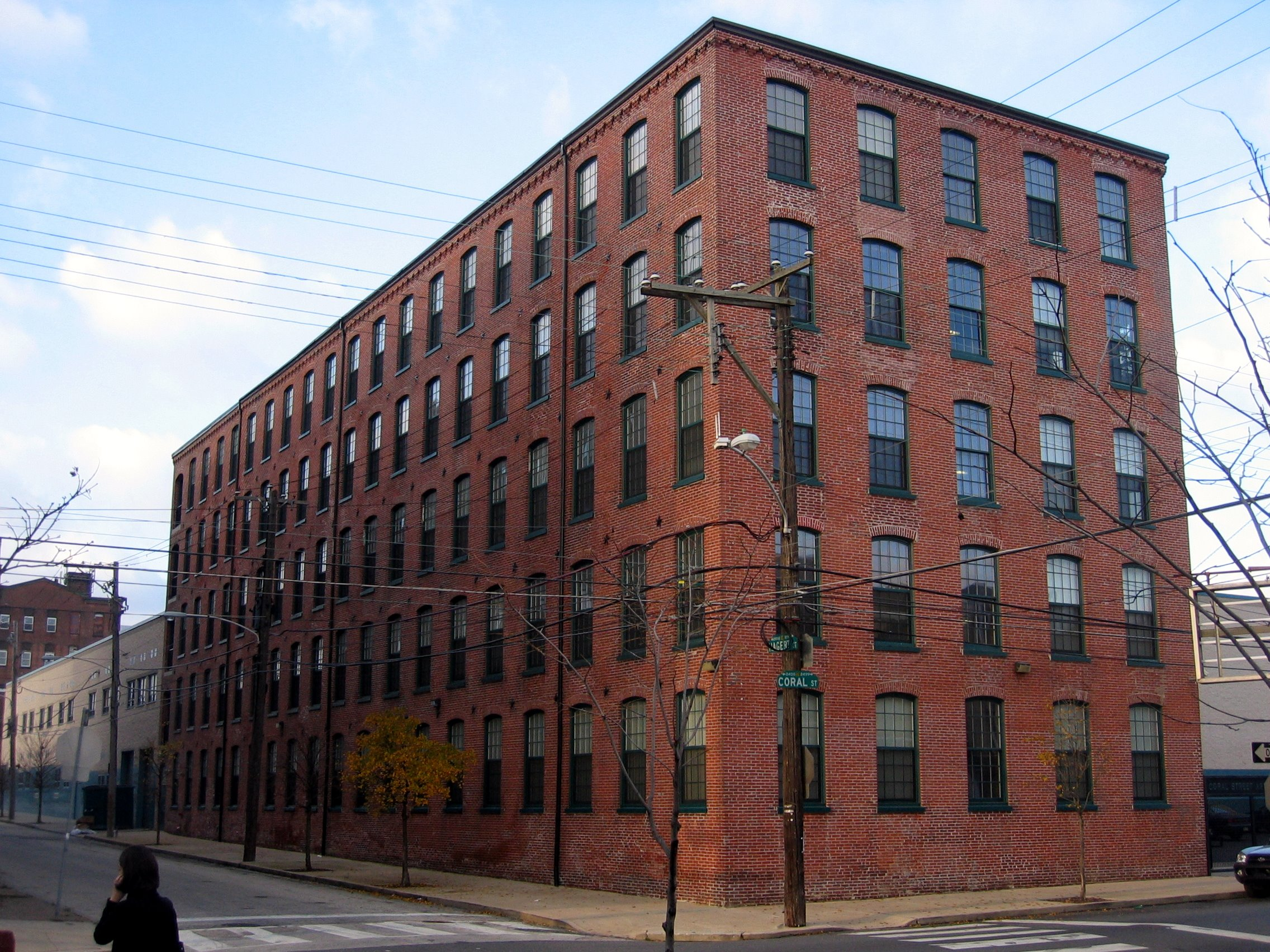
- Beatty's Mills Factory Building in the Kensington section of Philadelphia, November 2009

- Location within Philadelphia Location within Pennsylvania Location within the United States
- Location: 2446-2468 Coral St., Philadelphia, Pennsylvania
- Coordinates: 39°59′4″N 75°7′43″W
- Area: less than one acre
- Built: 1886
- Architectural style: Italianate
- NRHP reference No.: 04000881
- Added to NRHP: August 18, 2004

Beatty's Mills Factory Building, also known as Powell Mills, is a historic textile mill in the Kensington neighborhood of Philadelphia, Pennsylvania. It was built in 1886, and is a five-story, red brick building in the Italianate style. It was part of a complex of five buildings and is the only remaining structure. It is attached to a two-story school building built in 2002. The building housed textile-related manufacturing operations until 2000. It houses the Coral Street Arts House.

It was added to the National Register of Historic Places in 2004.
