= The Soloist =

2009 film by Joe Wright

- Theatrical release poster
- Directed by: Joe Wright
- Screenplay by: Susannah Grant
- Based on: The Soloist: A Lost Dream, an Unlikely Friendship, and the Redemptive Power of Music by Steve Lopez
- Produced by: Gary Foster; Russ Krasnoff
- Starring: Jamie Foxx; Robert Downey Jr.; Catherine Keener; Tom Hollander; LisaGay Hamilton
- Cinematography: Seamus McGarvey
- Edited by: Paul Tothill
- Music by: Dario Marianelli
- Production companies: DreamWorks Pictures; Universal Pictures; StudioCanal; Participant Media; Working Title Films; Krasnoff/Foster Entertainment
- Distributed by: Paramount Pictures (North America); StudioCanal (France); Universal Pictures (International)
- Release dates: April 24, 2009 (United States); September 11, 2009 (United Kingdom); December 23, 2009 (France)
- Running time: 117 minutes
- Countries: France; United Kingdom; United States
- Language: English
- Budget: $60 million
- Box office: $38.3 million

The Soloist is a 2009 biographical drama film directed by Joe Wright, and starring Jamie Foxx and Robert Downey Jr. The plot is based on the true story of Nathaniel Ayers, a musician who developed schizophrenia and became homeless. Originally intended to be released on November 21, 2008, the film was released in theaters on April 24, 2009 by Paramount Pictures in the United States, by Universal Pictures on September 11, 2009 in the United Kingdom, and by StudioCanal on December 23, 2009 in France. It received mixed reviews from critics and grossed just $38 million against its $60 million budget.

== Plot ==
In 2005, Steve Lopez is a journalist working for the Los Angeles Times. He is divorced and now works for his ex-wife, Mary, an editor. A biking accident lands Lopez in a hospital.

One day, he hears a violin being played beautifully. Investigating, he encounters Nathaniel Ayers, a homeless man with schizophrenia, who is playing a violin when Lopez introduces himself. During the conversation that follows, Lopez learns that Ayers once attended Juilliard.

Curious as to how a former student of such a prestigious school ended up on the streets, Lopez contacts Juilliard but learns that no record of Ayers graduating from it exists. Though at first figuring a man with schizophrenia who's talented with a cello isn't worth his time, Lopez soon realizes that he has no better story to write about. Luckily, he soon learns that Ayers did attend Juilliard, but dropped out after two years.

Finding Ayers the next day, Lopez says he wants to write about him. Ayers doesn't appear to be paying attention. Getting nowhere, Lopez finds and contacts Ayers' sister, who gives the columnist the information he needs: Ayers was once a child prodigy with the cello, until he began displaying symptoms of schizophrenia at Juilliard. Unable to handle the voices, Ayers dropped out and ended up on the streets due to the delusion that his sister wanted to kill him. Without a cello, he has resorted to playing a two-string violin.

Lopez writes his article. One reader is so touched that she sends a cello for Ayers. Lopez brings it to him and Ayers shows he is just as proficient as with a violin. Unfortunately, his tendency to wander puts both Ayers and the cello in danger, so Lopez talks him into leaving it at a shelter, located in a neighborhood of homeless people. Ayers is later seen playing for the homeless.

A concerned Lopez tries to get a doctor he knows to help. He also tries to talk Ayers into getting an apartment, but Ayers refuses. After seeing a reaction to music played at an opera house, Lopez persuades another friend, Graham, a cellist, to rehabilitate Ayers through music. The lessons go well, though Ayers is shown to be getting a little too attached to Lopez, much to the latter's annoyance. Lopez eventually talks Ayers into moving into an apartment by threatening to abandon him.

Through Lopez's article, Ayers gains so much fame that he is given the chance to perform a recital. Sadly, he loses his temper, attacks Graham, and leaves. This convinces Lopez's doctor friend to get Ayers help. But when Ayers learns what Lopez is up to, he throws Lopez out of his apartment and threatens to kill him.

While speaking with Mary, Lopez realizes that not only has he changed Ayers' life, but Ayers has changed his. Determined to make amends, Lopez brings Ayers' sister to L.A. for a visit. Ayers and Lopez make up. Later, while they all watch an orchestra, Lopez ponders how beneficial their friendship has been. Ayers still hears voices, but at least he no longer lives on the streets. In addition, Ayers has helped improve Lopez's relationship with his own family.

It is revealed at the end that Ayers is still a member of the LAMP Community – a Los Angeles nonprofit organization that seeks to help people living with severe mental illness – and that Lopez is learning how to play the guitar.

== Cast ==
- Jamie Foxx as Nathaniel Ayers
- Robert Downey Jr. as Steve Lopez
- Catherine Keener as Mary Weston
- Tom Hollander as Graham Claydon
- Lisa Gay Hamilton as Jennifer
- Nelsan Ellis as David Carter
- Rachael Harris as Leslie Bloom
- Stephen Root as Curt Reynolds
- Lorraine Toussaint as Flo Ayers
- Justin Martin as Young Nathaniel Ayers
- Octavia Spencer as Troubled Woman
- Jena Malone as Cheery Lab Tech
- Lemon Andersen as Uncle Tommy
- Noel G. as Winston Street Cop
- Artel Great as Leon

== Production ==
The film is based on the true story of Nathaniel Ayers, a musician who developed schizophrenia and became homeless. Directed by Joe Wright, was written by Susannah Grant, based on a series of columns written by Los Angeles Times columnist Steve Lopez, who chronicled the plight of Nathaniel Ayers Jr., a musician with schizophrenia, and eventually was chronicled in Lopez's book, The Soloist, which was published in the spring of 2008. The film was budgeted at $60 million, twice the budget amount of Wright's previous film, Atonement. Production began in January 2008 and was filmed mostly in Los Angeles, with some scenes shot in Cleveland.

== Reception ==
=== Box office ===
On its opening weekend, the film opened #4 behind Obsessed, 17 Again and Fighting, grossing $9.7 million in 2,024 theaters, with a $4,800 average per theater. The film went on to gross just half of its $60 million budget, bringing in $31.7 million domestically and $6.6 million in other territories, for a worldwide total of $38.3 million. This was blamed on the film's initial release date being postponed, as well as the film's release coming one week before the 2009 summer movie season.

=== Critical response ===
On Rotten Tomatoes, the film holds an approval rating of 57% based on 207 reviews, with an average score of 5.95/10. The site's critics consensus reads: "Though it features strong performances by its lead players, a lack of narrative focus prevents The Soloist from hitting its mark." On Metacritic, the film has a weighted average score of 61 out of 100, based on reviews from 33 critics, indicating "generally favorable reviews". Audiences surveyed by CinemaScore gave the film an average grade "B+" on scale of A+ to F.

Reviewers generally praise the performances by Robert Downey Jr. and Jamie Foxx, but comment on the film's lack of narrative focus in attempting to tell a convincing or engaging story, due to the somewhat "uneven" direction by director Joe Wright. Many felt that the project was a bit of a "mismatch" for Wright, and felt it was one of his weakest films to date, following the success of his adaptations of Pride & Prejudice and Atonement.

Roger Ebert of the Chicago Sun-Times wrote: "The Soloist has all the elements of an uplifting drama, except for the uplift. The story is compelling, the actors are in place, but I was never sure what the filmmakers wanted me to feel about it."

== Soundtrack ==
The soundtrack to The Soloist was released on April 21, 2009.

No.	Title	Artist	Length
1.	"Pershing Square"	Dario Marianelli	0:48
2.	"Crazy About Beethoven"	Dario Marianelli	2:01
3.	"Paper Mache World"	Dario Marianelli	1:33
4.	"A City Symphony"	Dario Marianelli	3:41
5.	"This Is My Apartment"	Dario Marianelli	1:54
6.	"There Is No Escape"	Dario Marianelli	1:36
7.	"Falling Apart"	Dario Marianelli	1:10
8.	"Four Billion Years"	Dario Marianelli	2:54
9.	"Nathaniel Breaks Down"	Dario Marianelli	5:31
10.	"Accordion Interlude"	Dario Marianelli	2:07
11.	"The Lord's Prayer"	Dario Marianelli	3:12
12.	"The Voices Within"	Dario Marianelli	2:09
13.	"Sister"	Dario Marianelli	5:34
14.	"Cello Lesson"	Dario Marianelli	2:27
15.	"Mr. Ayers and Mr. Lopez"	Dario Marianelli	11:10
Total length:			47:47
