= Kensington Corridor Trust =

Neighborhood Trust in Philadelphia, USA

Kensington Corridor Trust (KCT)
- Formation: September 2019
- Type: Neighborhood Trust (Nonprofit, Perpetual Purpose Trust)
- Headquarters: 3400 J St. Unit G12, Philadelphia, PA 19134
- Website: https://kctphilly.org/

The Kensington Corridor Trust (KCT) is one of the first neighborhood trusts in the United States. Located in the Kensington neighborhood of Philadelphia, Pennsylvania, the organization purchases real estate to remove it from the speculative market and counter the displacement caused by gentrification. Kensington residents and business owners govern the trust, developing its assets for intergenerational affordability and local control. The KCT nonprofit entity, which is also legally tethered to a perpetual purpose trust, was founded in September 2019 by four Philadelphia based organizations. The KCT currently stewards 33 properties.

== Founding ==
In 2019, Shift Capital, a certified Benefit Corporation and real estate developer, sought to sell several of its properties in Kensington without contributing to displacement. With the aim of securing and developing affordable real estate to prevent current residents from being priced out, Shift Capital, the Philadelphia Industrial Development Corporation, Impact Services, and the business incubator IF Lab founded the KCT.

The founders sought to establish the KCT as a neighborhood trust. With assets owned and governed by the Kensington community, the founders hoped that the KCT would develop property for neighborhood benefit exclusively, rather than speculate on future prices or host extractive businesses at higher rents. They were also drawn to the neighborhood trust model because it calls on residents and locals, rather than "outsiders," to decide what neighborhood benefit means.

In 2021, the founders ceded control of the board to local stakeholders and residents.

In 2023, the KCT created a perpetual purpose trust legal entity to permanently hold assets outside of the market and establish a local democratic body, the Trust Stewardship Committee, to govern them. The Trust Stewardship Committee, composed of Kensington residents, small business owners, community leaders, and youth, makes decisions on major operations priorities, acquisition, development, tenancy, and asset exit rules.

== Structure ==
The KCT follows the neighborhood trust model as proposed by Joseph Margulies. A neighborhood trust is distinct in that residents and other local stakeholders, rather than outside foundations, corporations, or government entities, direct and collectively own investments in the given area. The KCT maintains two legally and financially tethered entities: a perpetual purpose trust and a 501(c)(3) nonprofit.

=== Perpetual purpose trust entity ===
A purpose trust is a relatively new entity which allows assets to be held for a legally defined purpose, rather than a specific beneficiary. The KCT's legally enshrined purpose is to maintain local control, collective ownership, and the intergenerational affordability of real estate along the Kensington Avenue commercial corridor. The perpetual purpose trust is legally responsible for the stewardship of KCT assets. It interprets and upholds the foundational purpose of the trust, guiding the nonprofit's general practice and making the final call on important decisions. The Perpetual Purpose Trust Stewardship Committee (TSC) is the decision-making body for all of KCT's purpose related actions. There are nine total seats on the TSC: two for current or former residents, two for local small business owners, two for community leaders, two for youth leaders (ages 16–21), and one crossover member from the nonprofit board.

Since purpose trusts are not held for the benefit of a specific person or entity who can hold the trust accountable, they are required to select an external "trust enforcer" entity. Trust enforcers cannot have any direct financial ties to the trust, since they must intervene, possibly via litigation, if they believe the trust is being directed in violation of its purpose. Since neighborhood locals are integral to the KCT's purpose, all Kensington residents may appeal if they believe the KCT is violating its charter.

=== Nonprofit entity ===
KCT maintains a 501(c)(3) nonprofit entity, which is legally obligated to align itself with the purpose of the trust entity, to meet the underwriting and philanthropic guidelines of investors. This entity manages everyday physical and administrative operations like property identification, fundraising, negotiation, redevelopment, and management. It is governed by a board of directors made up of current or former community residents and small business owners who have the power to approve an annual budget, fundraising initiatives and investment, new partnerships, and programs, as well as evaluate the executive director. The Board of Directors includes one crossover member who also serves on the Trust Stewardship Committee.

The nonprofit maintains a professional staff in order to carry out its work and help interface with the trust. This includes an executive director, operations and property manager, construction project manager, community organizer, and development and communications manager.

== Real estate operation ==
The KCT purchases commercial and mixed-use properties on the Kensington Avenue commercial corridor. Placed in the KCT perpetual purpose trust, these properties are used for neighborhood benefit as determined by its charter and local governance. The KCT rents their properties at affordable, non-market rates and considers the properties placed into the trust to be de-commodified due to their being outside of the speculative marketplace and almost impossible to resell. Assets may only exit the trust if a longtime small business owner has demonstrated their commitment to the neighborhood and seeks ownership to build intergenerational wealth. The KCT's current geographic focus is the three block area from Allegheny to J Street (3200-3400 Kensington Avenue), but eventually the KCT aims to acquire more broadly from Lehigh Avenue to Glenwood Avenue (2700-3500 Kensington Avenue).

=== Commercial spaces ===
The KCT seeks to host businesses that locals want, that preserve or highlight local culture, that are not exploitative of labor, that are owned by local women of color, and that build solidarity economics into their operation. The KCT also does not host businesses that it deems predatory or extractive. The KCT aims to make its commercial spaces affordable for local small businesses, setting commercial rents at 25% below market rate.

=== Residential spaces ===
The KCT makes the residential units in the mixed-use properties they acquire affordable to the residents who have historically lived in Kensington, setting the rents for these units at affordable rates based on local incomes instead of at market rate. Specifically, the KCT supports households in the 30-60% median income range.

== Policy Advocacy ==
The KCT supports or challenges legislation to enhance their work and benefit Kensington residents.

This includes membership in the Philadelphia Coalition for Affordable Communities (PCAC), a coalition of community, disability, faith, arts, labor, and urban agriculture organizations which represents over 100,000 poor and working-class Philadelphia residents in advocating for affordable housing and food in Philadelphia.

Gloria “Smooches” Cartagena Hart, the KCT's community organizer, testified before Philadelphia City Council representing the KCT in support of Resolution 240697 on February 11 of 2025, which upholds that regional area median income (AMI) is not an adequate metric for setting affordable housing program eligibility and results in City housing programs not providing sufficient funding to those most in need. The resolution specifically outlines how these issues could be solved by adopting a more locally defined AMI, ensuring more genuinely affordable housing in Philadelphia.

The KCT is a member of Transit Forward Philadelphia, a coalition of Philadelphia-based organizations that aims to improve public transit in Greater Philadelphia, seeking to amplify the voices of SEPTA riders, making public transit in the Greater Philadelphia region equitable, accessible, safe, and sustainable.

Hart also testified before Philadelphia City Council representing the KCT as part of a hearing concerning Resolution 240827, which dealt with the issue of illegal dumping in Philadelphia and examined the city's response to it.

The KCT collaborates with the Food Policy Advisory Council (FPAC), which is made up of food system representatives that advise the Mayor and local government on policy to create a more just food system for all Philadelphians, specifically with white supremacy, anti-Black racism, and interlocking forms of oppression that create barriers to equitable access and control of food, land, and labor in mind.

Hart represents the KCT as a community partner of the Philadelphia Regional Center for Children's Environmental Health, which aims to improve the health and wellness of children in Philadelphia and the surrounding region.

== Climate resilience ==
The KCT incorporates green energy and greening initiatives into its operations whenever, however, the high cost of building energy efficient buildings is a major roadblock. The KCT currently stewards a community garden consisting of 11 formerly vacant lots which contains pollinator plants native to Pennsylvania in addition to functioning as a third space and a place for community events and gatherings.

== Public art ==
The KCT supports public art installations as part of its efforts to reactivate spaces and enhance the neighborhood's cultural and social fabric. Two pieces of public art have been installed in the KCT community garden: a mural and an immersive sculpture.
