= St. Anne Church (Philadelphia) =

Saint Anne Church
- Church of Saint Anne
- Location within Philadelphia
- 39.957568°N 75.167594°W
- Location: Philadelphia
- Country: United States
- Denomination: Roman Catholic

History
- Founded: 1845

Administration
- Archdiocese: Philadelphia

The Church of Saint Anne (commonly known as St. Anne Church, or Saint Anne's) is an Irish Roman Catholic Parish in the Archdiocese of Philadelphia. The church was founded in 1845. The church serves the communities of Fishtown, Port Richmond, and Kensington.

The school, which was founded in 1854, had about 1,000 students in the 1970s. It was closed in June 2011, due to falling enrollment. NHS Human Services School at St. Annes, which caters to children with autism, opened in its place in 2015.
