= Juniata, Philadelphia =

Juniata
- Neighborhood of Philadelphia
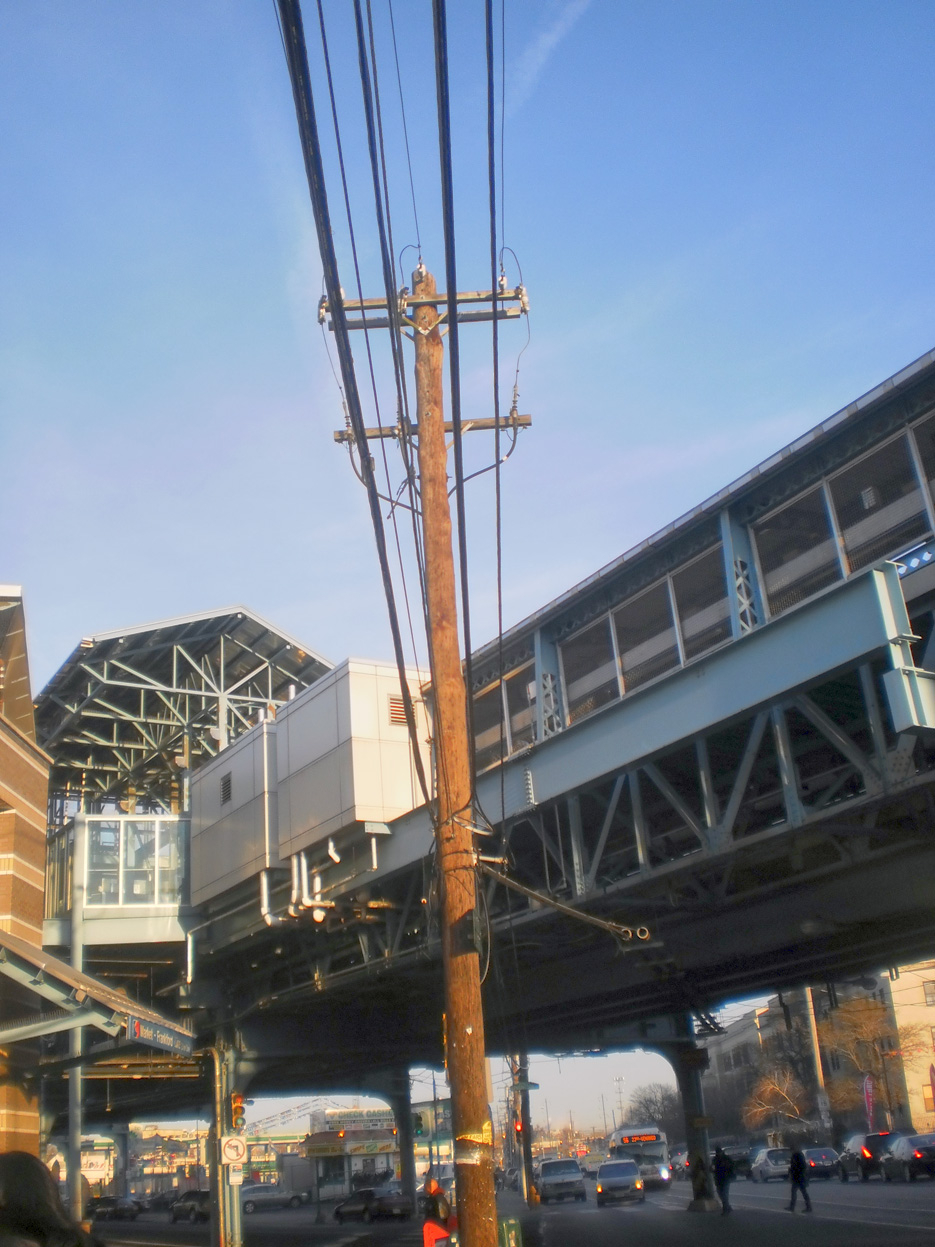
- The entrance of Erie-Torresdale along Erie and Kensington Avenues in Juniata

- Location within Philadelphia
- Country: United States
- State: Pennsylvania
- County: Philadelphia County
- City: Philadelphia
- Area codes: 215, 267 and 445

Juniata (also known as Juniata Park) is a working class neighborhood in North Philadelphia, which is a section of the city of Philadelphia, Pennsylvania, United States. Juniata is located south of the Juniata Golf Club in Tacony Creek Park. It is bordered to the east by Frankford, to the west by Feltonville, and to the south by Harrowgate and Port Richmond. The neighborhood is bordered by G Street to the west, Juniata Park to the north, Tacony Creek to the east, and by SEPTA rail tracks to the south. Juniata shares the ZIP code of 19124 with the nearby neighborhood of Frankford.

== History ==
Prior to the 1920s, Juniata Park was mostly farmland. Nicetown Lane ran generally west to east from near the line of B St. and Erie Avenue through to the present-day Pike Street and Frankford Avenue. Powder Mill Lane ran from the present-day Wingohocking Street in Frankford southwest to Nicetown Lane, near the intersection of L and Lycoming Sts. I Street, from Ramona Avenue west, was called Fisher's Lane and ran generally through the west side of the Tacony Creek to the intersection of Harrowgate Lane, near the present day H Street and Ramona Avenue. Harrowgate Lane ran generally south and southeast into Harrowgate to the present day Atlantic Street, ending at Frankford Avenue.

The neighborhood's name comes from the Iroquoian word "onenhia", meaning "standing stone."

The first row homes were built in Juniata Park, near Castor Avenue and Luzerne Street, in the mid-1920s. The western area of Juniata, around I and Cayuga Streets, was developed in the 1950s.

== Facilities and infrastructure ==
The Market–Frankford Line elevated train stops in the neighborhood at the Erie-Torresdale Station, located at the intersection of Erie, and Torresdale Avenues.

The Juniata News, the neighborhood's weekly community newspaper, was first published in July 1934.

Most of the neighborhood's retail and commercial establishments are situated along Castor, Hunting Park, and Erie Avenues.

In 1935, the Carl Mackley Houses (now Apartments) were constructed on the block bounded by Castor Avenue, Bristol, M, and Cayuga Streets.

== Schools ==
- One Bright Ray Community High School
- Francis Hopkinson School
- Holy Innocents Area Catholic Elementary Catholic School
- Juniata Park Academy
- Saint Lucy Day School for Children with Visual Impairments
- Archbishop Ryan Academy for the Deaf
- Community Academy of Philadelphia CS

== Churches ==
- Bethel Chapel Church, K and Lycoming Sts.
- Holy Innocents Roman Catholic Church 1337 E. Hunting Park Ave.
- Holy Spirit United Methodist, 1441 E. Hunting Park Ave.
- Nazareth Evangelical Lutheran Church, M and Luzerne Sts.
- African Orthodox Church, 1326 E. Hunting Park Ave.
- New Apostolic Church, K and Cayuga Sts.
- Vietnamese Alliance Church, 931 E. Lycoming St.

== Population ==
The population is 13,617.

When largely built in the 1920s and 1930s, Juniata Park had a mixed population, largely German-American, with German bakeries and delicatessen/grocery stores, and Jewish grocery and drug stores. The neighborhood was known as a heavily unionized area.

Since the 1990s, Juniata transitioned from a predominantly working class Irish American community to a largely working class Puerto Rican and Dominican community. As of 2010, the neighborhood was 59.6% Hispanic, 18.1% White, 14.5% Black, and 7.7% Asian and other.
