= Nathaniel Ayers =

American musician (born 1951)

- Born: Nathaniel Anthony Ayers, Jr. January 31, 1951 (age 75); Cleveland, Ohio, U.S.
- Instruments: Double bass, violin, cello, drums, piano

Nathaniel Anthony Ayers, Jr. (born January 31, 1951) is an American musician. He is the subject of numerous newspaper columns, a book, and a 2009 film adaptation based on the columns. A foundation bearing his name was started in 2008 with an aim to support artistically gifted people with mental illness.

== Early and personal life ==
Ayers began playing the double bass during middle school. He attended the Juilliard School in New York as a double bassist, but had a mental breakdown during his second year and was institutionalized. Ayers was one of the few black students at Juilliard at that time.

For some years he lived with his mother in Cleveland, Ohio, where he received electroconvulsive therapy for his illness, to no avail. After his mother's death in 2000, he moved to Los Angeles, thinking that his father lived there. Homeless and debilitated with symptoms of schizophrenia, Ayers lived and played music on the streets.

== The Soloist ==
Los Angeles Times columnist Steve Lopez met Ayers at Pershing Square in 2005, and discovered his background at Juilliard. Lopez wrote several columns about his relationship with Ayers, and his slow transition out of homelessness. Lopez's subsequent book, The Soloist: A Lost Dream, an Unlikely Friendship, and the Redemptive Power of Music, was based on their relationship.

The book has been adapted into a film and a play titled The Soloist, released April 24, 2009, with Jamie Foxx and Robert Downey Jr. in the lead roles. In the film, Ayers is depicted as a cellist, rather than a bassist.

Ayers and Lopez's relationship was also nationally highlighted in the March 22, 2009 episode of 60 Minutes on CBS.

== The Nathaniel Anthony Ayers Foundation ==
Ayers's sister, Jennifer Ayers-Moore, is the chairwoman and founder of the Nathaniel Anthony Ayers Foundation. Launched in 2008, it began with Jennifer's desire to help what she and Nathaniel hope will be thousands of people. An endowment will be set up to promote public awareness of mental health. The NAAF facilitates the appreciation of artistic expression's contributions to the advancement of wellness and treatment, collaborates with mental health and arts organizations to identify and exhibit artwork, and to provides grants to worthy nonprofit organizations that embody the mission of the foundation.
