= Steve Lopez =

American journalist

- Born: Steven M. Lopez; 1953 (age 72–73); Pittsburg, California, U.S.
- Education: San Jose State University
- Occupation: Journalist/Author
- Organization: The Los Angeles Times
- Children: 3

Steven M. Lopez (born 1953) is an American journalist and four-time Pulitzer Prize finalist who has been a columnist for The Los Angeles Times since 2001.

== Life and career ==
Lopez is a native of Pittsburg, California, and attended San Jose State University. He has been on staff at Time Inc. and written for Time, Life, Entertainment Weekly and Sports Illustrated. In addition, he was on staff at The Philadelphia Inquirer, the San Jose Mercury News and the Oakland Tribune. He wrote the novels Third and Indiana, The Sunday Macaroni Club, and In the Clear. He has also compiled a collection of his works from The Philadelphia Inquirer titled Land of Giants, and a collection of Los Angeles Times columns called Dreams & Schemes.

Lopez's series of columns about his unlikely relationship with a homeless Juilliard-trained musician with schizophrenia Nathaniel Anthony Ayers became the subject of a national best-selling book by Lopez that inspired the film The Soloist, which stars Robert Downey Jr. as Lopez. Ayers' and Lopez's relationship was also nationally highlighted in the March 22, 2009, episode of 60 Minutes.

He has two sons and a daughter. In 2012 following knee replacement surgery, he experienced cardiac arrest.

== Awards ==
Lopez has won numerous national journalism awards including the H.L. Mencken, Mike Royko and Ernie Pyle awards. As a four-time Pulitzer finalist, his subjects were elder care, income inequality, homelessness and the California housing crisis.

In 2008 Lopez received the President's Award from the Los Angeles Press Club at the 50th Annual Southern California Journalism Awards.

His book, The Soloist, won the PEN USA award for literary non-fiction.

Lopez has also won three local news Emmys and a share of the Columbia DuPont Award for his civic affairs reporting at KCET-TV in Los Angeles. He won the Shorenstein Center on Media, Politics and Public Policy’s 2021 Nyhan Prize in Political Journalism.

On April 29, 2011, Lopez received an honorary doctorate degree from his alma mater, San Jose State University.
