= West Kensington, Philadelphia =

West Kensington
- Neighborhood of Philadelphia
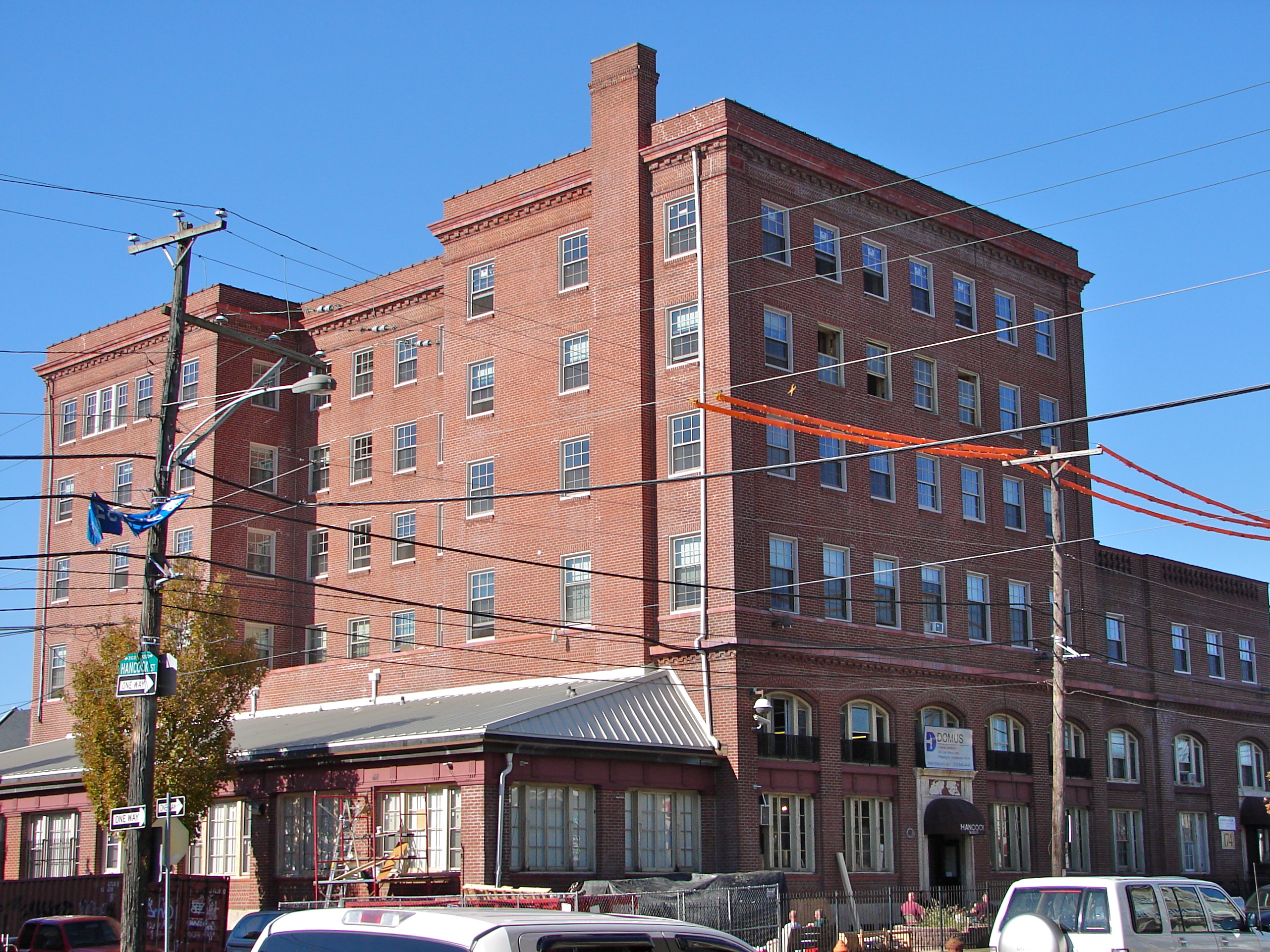
- Kensington Branch of the Philadelphia YWCA

- Location within Philadelphia
- Country: United States
- State: Pennsylvania
- County: Philadelphia
- City: Philadelphia
- Area codes: 215, 267 and 445

West Kensington is a neighborhood in the North Philadelphia section of Philadelphia, Pennsylvania, United States. It is north of Olde Kensington. The Market Frankford El above Front Street forms the line between West Kensington and Kensington. Its bordering neighborhoods are Kensington to the east, Hartranft to the west, and Olde Kensington to the south. It is bounded by Front Street to the east, 6th Street to the west, York Street to the south and Lehigh Avenue to the north. It falls into the 19122 and 19133 ZIP codes.

== Demographics ==
As of the 2010 Census, West Kensington was 71.7% Hispanic, 17.2% African American, 5% White, 2.9% Asian, 3.1% other. Historically it had been a heavily Irish-American neighborhood. Today the community is largely populated by Latinos (mostly Puerto Ricans and Dominicans), but also has significant populations of Irish Americans, Italian Americans, and African Americans.

== Landmarks ==
The neighborhood was the fictional setting of the movie Rocky, by Sylvester Stallone. It is alternatively known as "K&A" (for the intersection of Kensington and Allegheny Avenues.)

The William Adamson School and David Farragut School are listed on the National Register of Historic Places.

== Education ==
School District of Philadelphia operates public schools.

The Free Library of Philadelphia Lillian Marrero Branch serves West Kensington.
