= Richmond District, Pennsylvania =

Richmond District
- Former District
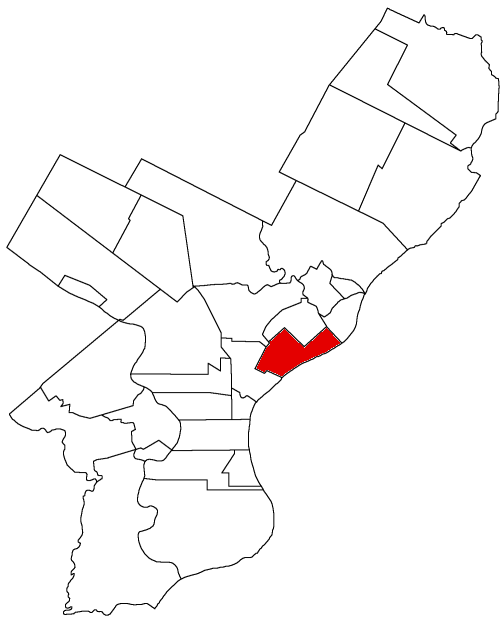
- Map of Philadelphia County, Pennsylvania highlighting Richmond District prior to the Act of Consolidation, 1854
- Coordinates: 39°58′30″N 75°06′40″W
- Country: United States
- State: Pennsylvania
- County: Philadelphia
- Time zone: UTC-5 (EST)
  - Summer (DST): UTC-4 (EDT)
- Area codes: 215, 267, and 445

Richmond District, also known as Port Richmond District, was a district that was located in Philadelphia County, Pennsylvania, United States. The district ceased to exist and was incorporated into the City of Philadelphia following the passage of the Act of Consolidation, 1854.

== History ==
The district was originally the name of a tract of land in Northern Liberties Township, adjoining the Delaware River north of Ball Town and south of Point-No-Point. It was incorporated as a district on February 27, 1847. It extended along the Delaware River to a point some distance northwest of the upper end of Petty Island; then northwest nearly to the point where Frankford Creek makes its most southerly bend; thence southerly bend; thence southwest to Westmoreland Street; northwest along the same to Emerald Street; southwest along the latter to a lane running from Frankford Turnpike to Nicetown Lane; along Frankford Turnpike to the north boundary of Kensington District, and down the same to Gunners' Run, and along that stream to the Delaware River. The area was 1163 acres (4.7 km^{2}).
