= List of schools in the Archdiocese of Philadelphia =

List of schools of the Roman Catholic Archdiocese of Philadelphia.

== High schools ==
=== Diocesan high schools ===
Leadership within the Archdiocese of Philadelphia envisioned a continued comprehensive education for secondary students.

The first free Catholic high school in the United States was the "Roman Catholic High School of Philadelphia", founded for the education of boys in 1890. (It is often referred to as "Roman Catholic", occasionally as "Catholic High", and most commonly as "Roman".) The "Catholic Girls High School" was founded in 1912. Mary McMichan, one of the school's founders, requested in her last will that the school be renamed in honor of her brother. The school became "John W. Hallahan Catholic Girls High School" after her death. John W. Hallahan was shut down by the Archdiocese at the conclusion of the 2020–2021 school year due to finances. Roman Catholic is still in existence.

Between 1916 and 1927 West Catholic Boys and Girls and Northeast Catholic were opened. Despite the economic hardships of the 1930s and 1940s, seven more diocesan high schools were founded. During a 22-year growth period from 1945 to 1967, fifteen high schools were opened.

Philadelphia

- Archbishop Ryan High School, established 1966
- Father Judge High School, established 1954; administered by the Oblates of St. Francis de Sales
- Little Flower Catholic High School for Girls, established 1939
- Roman Catholic High School, established 1890
- St. Hubert Catholic High School for Girls, established 1941
- Saints John Neumann and Maria Goretti Catholic High School, established 2004 (merger of Saint John Neumann HS and Saint Maria Goretti HS)
- West Catholic Preparatory High School, established 1916, erected 1926. (West Catholic High School for Boys merged into West Philadelphia Catholic Girls'High School building in 1989.)

Bucks County

- Conwell–Egan Catholic High School, established 1957
- Archbishop Wood Catholic High School, established 1964

Chester County

- Bishop Shanahan High School, established 1957

Delaware County

- Bonner & Prendergast Catholic High School, merged 2012 (established as Monsignor Bonner High School for boys in 1953 & Archbishop Prendergast High School for Girls in 1956 – both schools were on the same campus)
- Archbishop John Carroll High School, established 1967
- Cardinal O'Hara High School, established 1963

Montgomery County

- Lansdale Catholic High School, established 1949
- Pope John Paul II High School, established 2010 (replaced Kennedy-Kenrick HS and St. Pius X HS and was the first Philadelphia suburban newly constructed high school since 1967)

=== Private high schools ===
Though not funded or operated by the archdiocese, the following independent schools operate "with the blessing and spiritual support of the archdiocese":

- Academy of Notre Dame de Namur, Villanova
- Sacred Heart Academy, Bryn Mawr
- Cristo Rey Philadelphia High School, Philadelphia
- Devon Preparatory School, Devon
- Gwynedd Mercy Academy High School, Gwynedd Valley
- Holy Ghost Preparatory School, Bensalem
- La Salle College High School, Wyndmoor
- Malvern Preparatory School, Malvern
- Martin Saints Classical High School, Oreland
- Mercy Vocational High School, Philadelphia
- Merion Mercy Academy, Merion
- Mount Saint Joseph Academy, Flourtown
- Nazareth Academy High School, Philadelphia
- Regina Luminis Academy, Berwyn – Grades K-12
- Saint Joseph's Preparatory School, Philadelphia
- Villa Joseph Marie High School, Holland
- Villa Maria Academy, Malvern

== Elementary schools ==
Bucks County

- Holy Family Regional Catholic School (Levittown)
- Holy Trinity (Morrisville)
- Nativity of Our Lord School (Warminster)
- Our Lady of Good Counsel School (Southampton)
- Our Lady of Mount Carmel School (Doylestown)
- Our Lady of Grace School (Penndel)
- St. Andrew School (Newtown)
- St. Charles Borromeo School (Bensalem)
- St. Ephrem School (Bensalem)
- St. Ignatius of Antioch School (Yardley)
- St. Isidore School (Quakertown)
- St. Jude Catholic Education Center (Chalfont)
- St. Joseph-St. Robert School (Warrington Township)
- St. Katharine Drexel Regional Catholic School (Holland)
  - Established in 2012 by the merger of Assumption B.V.M. and St. Bede the Venerable.
- St. Mark School (Bristol)
- St. Michael the Archangel (Levittown)

Chester County

- Assumption BVM School (West Grove)
- Holy Family School (Phoenixville)
  - It is the designated school of St. Basil the Great, which previously had its own school.
- Pope John Paul II Regional Catholic Elementary School (West Brandywine Township)
- Sacred Heart School (Oxford)
- SS. Philip and James School (West Whiteland Township, outside of the Exton CDP)
- St. Agnes School (West Chester) – It opened in 1871. As of 2020 its enrollment is over 300.
- SS. Peter and Paul School (East Goshen Township, near West Chester)
- SS. Simon and Jude School (Westtown Township, near West Chester)
- St. Elizabeth School (Upper Uwchlan Township)
- St. Joseph School (Downingtown)
- St. Maximilian Kolbe School (Westtown Township, near West Chester)
- St. Norbert School (Easttown Township, outside of the Paoli CDP, but with a Paoli mailing address) – It was established in 1956, with the school building built the following year.
- St. Patrick School (Malvern)

Delaware County

- Blessed Virgin Mary School (Darby)
- Cardinal John Foley Regional Catholic School (Havertown)
  - It was established in 2012 by the merger of Annunciation BVM and St. Denis. Circa 2012 the enrollment count was 515, with each class having around 24-25 students. The Foley merger meant that the school could get additional staff such as a science teacher and a full-time Spanish teacher. It is named after John Patrick Foley.
- Drexel Neumann Academy (Chester)
- Holy Cross School (Springfield)
- Holy Family Regional Catholic School (Aston)
  - Established in 2012 by the merger of Holy Savior-St. John Fisher and St. Joseph.
- Mother of Providence Regional Catholic School (Wallingford)
  - Established in 2012 by the merger of Nativity B.V.M. and St. John Chrystosom.
- Notre Dame de Lourdes School (Swarthmore)
- Our Lady of Angels Regional Catholic School (Ridley Township, near Morton)
  - Established in 2012 by the merger of Our Lady of Fatima and Our Lady of Perpetual Help, it was named after the former Our Lady of the Angels Church in West Philadelphia. In 2012 it had about 503 students, with 215 originating from Our Lady of Fatima. In 2018, as a fire had affected the classroom area, the students were temporarily housed at Cardinal O'Hara. The Ridley School District provided transportation. By 2019 there were 315 students, and the school was being rebuilt.
- Sacred Heart School (Havertown)
- Saint Andrew School (Drexel Hill CDP, Upper Darby Township)
- St. Anastasia School (Newtown Square)
- St. Bernadette of Lourdes School (Drexel Hill CDP, Upper Darby Township)
- St. Cornelius School (Chadds Ford Township)
- St. Dorothy School (Drexel Hill CDP, Upper Darby Township)
- St. Eugene School (Primos, Upper Darby Township)
- St. Francis of Assisi School (Springfield)
- St. James Regional Catholic School (Ridley Park)
  - Established in 2012 by the merger of St. Gabriel and St. Madeline/St. Rose. The name originated from the Former St. James High School in Chester. The St. James High alumni association suggested the name, and the new school asked to use not only the name but also the mascot and colors. When it opened it had 402 students, with around 201 being from St. Gabriel.
- St. Katharine of Siena School (Wayne, Radnor Township)
- St. Laurence School (Upper Darby)
- St. Mary Magdalen School (Upper Providence Township, near Media)
- St. Pius X School (Broomall)
- St. Thomas the Apostle School (Glen Mills)

Montgomery County

- Corpus Christi School (Lansdale)
- Good Shepherd Catholic Regional School (Ardsley)
- Holy Cross Regional Catholic School (Collegeville)
  - Established in 2012 by the merger of Sacred Heart and St. Eleanor.
- Holy Rosary Regional Catholic School (Plymouth Meeting)
  - Established in 2012 by the merger of Epiphany of Our Lord, Our Lady of Victory, and St. Titus.
- Mary Mother of the Redeemer School (North Wales)
- Mater Dei Regional Catholic School (Lansdale)
  - Established in 2012 by the merger of St. Rose of Lima and St. Stanislaus.
- Mother Teresa Regional Catholic School (King of Prussia)
  - Established in 2012 by the merger of Mother of Divine Providence and St. Teresa of Avila.
- Our Lady of Confidence School (Main Site) (Willow Grove)
- Our Lady of Mercy Regional School (Maple Glen)
  - Established in 2012 by the merger of St. Alphonsus, St. Anthony-St. Joseph, and St. Catherine of Siena.
- Presentation B.V.M. School (Cheltenham)
- Queen of Angels Regional School (Willow Grove CDP and Upper Moreland Township)
  - Established in 2012 by the merger of Our Lady Help of Christians and St. David.
- Saint Luke Catholic School (Glenside)
  - Established in 2012 by the merger of Immaculate Conception and St. Luke the Evangelist, it originally operated as a regional school and was named St. Joseph the Protector Regional Catholic School, in honor of the group that provided teachers to the predecessor schools, Sisters of Saint Joseph of Chestnut Hill. In July 2018 the school changed its name and came under the direct control of Saint Luke parish; the decision to do so was made the previous year.
- SS. Colman-John Neumann School (Bryn Mawr)
- St. Albert the Great School (Huntingdon Valley)
- St. Aloysius School (Pottstown)
- St. Francis of Assisi School (Norristown)
- St. Helena School (Blue Bell)
- St. Hilary of Poitiers School (Rydal)
- St. Margaret School (Narberth)
- St. Mary School (Schwenksville)
- St. Philip Neri (Lafayette Hill, Pennsylvania)
- St. Teresa of Calcutta (Schwenksville)
- Visitation B.V.M. School (West Norriton Township, near the Trooper census-designated place, and near Norristown)

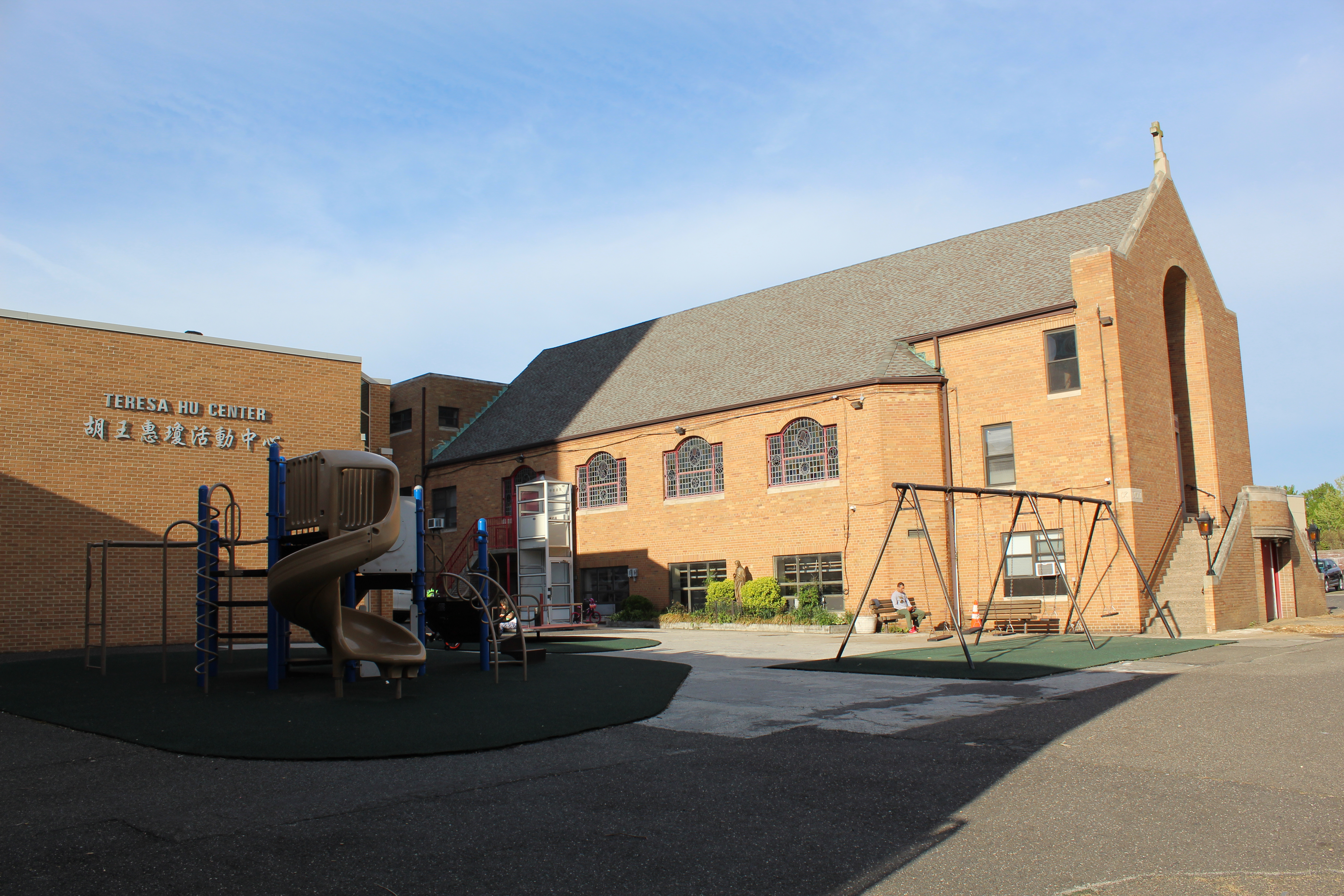
Holy Redeemer Chinese Catholic Church and School in Chinatown, Philadelphia

Philadelphia

- Blessed Trinity Regional Catholic School
  - Established in 2012 by the merger of Pope John Paul II Regional School and St. Timothy. Pope John Paul II Regional School was created by merging St. John Cantius School – Bridesburg, All Saints School – Bridesburg, and St. Bartholomew School – Wissonoming.
- Christ the King School
- Holy Innocents Area Catholic Elementary School
  - It served as the parish school of St. Joachim Church.
- Holy Redeemer Chinese Catholic School (Chinatown)
  - Holy Redeemer Chinese Catholic Church and School (traditional Chinese: 費城華人天主教教堂暨培德學校; simplified Chinese: 费城华人天主教教堂暨培德学校; pinyin: Fèichéng Huárén Tiānzhǔjiào Jiàotáng jì péi dé Xuéxiào) was constructed in 1941. David J. Wallace of The New York Times said that it was "a leading Chinatown institution." Historically many Chinatown residents enrolled their children in the school, and the community used the church and school complex as a meeting place and a community center. In the 1990s the school lost much of its schoolyard due to expansion of the Vine Street Expressway. In 2005 it was the only school in Chinatown.
- Immaculate Heart of Mary School (Roxborough)
- Maternity B.V.M. School, Bustleton, Philadelphia
- Mother of Divine Grace School
- Our Lady of Calvary School
- Our Lady of Port Richmond Regional Catholic School
  - It was established in September 2008 by the merger of Nativity B.V.M, Our Lady Help of Christians, and St. Adalbert schools. Each of the predecessor schools had enrollments of about 200. The 2008 economic downturn prompted the schools to merge. There were 545 students in the merged school in 2008, but the continued economic malaise resulted in declining enrollments. By 2016 enrollment was at about 400 and recovering.
- Our Mother of Consolation School (Chestnut Hill) *Destroyed by fire on March 21, 2023
  - The building has a capacity of 230. In 2012 it had 185 students.
- Our Lady of Hope Regional Catholic School
  - Established in 2012 by the merger of Epiphany of Our Lord, Our Lady of Mt. Carmel, and Sacred Heart of Jesus.
- Resurrection Regional Catholic School (Rhawnhurst)
  - Established in 2012 by the merger of Our Lady of Ransom and Resurrection of Our Lord.
- St. Anselm School
- St. Anthony of Padua Regional Catholic School
  - Established in 2012 by the merger of Annunciation B.V.M. and St. Nicholas of Tolentine School.
- St. Athanasius-Immaculate Conception
- St. Cecilia School (Fox Chase)
  - In 2012 the archdiocese considered closing the school, but kept it open after the school community appealed.
- St. Christopher School
- St. Dominic School
- St. Francis De Sales School
  - It is one of the designated schools for St. Agatha – St. James Church.
- St. Francis Xavier (Fairmount)
- St. Genevieve School (Flourtown)
- St. George School (Port Richmond)
  - In 2012 the archdiocese considered closing the school, but kept it open after the school community appealed.
- St. Jerome School
- St. Katherine of Siena School
- St. Laurentius School of Holy Name of Jesus Parish (in Fishtown)
  - Circa 2007 the Holy Name Catholic School and St. Anne's Catholic School closed, with students accepted at St. Laurentius. In 2012 the archdiocese considered closing the school, but kept it open after the school community appealed.
- St. Martha School
- St. Mary Interparochial School (Society Hill)
  - It is the designated parish school of St. Augustine Church in Old City, Old St. Joseph's Church in Society Hill, and Old St. Mary's Church in Society Hill.
- St. Matthew School (West Mayfair)
  - In 2012 the archdiocese considered closing the school, but kept it open after the school community appealed.
- St. Monica School (Junior and Senior Schools)
- St. Peter the Apostle School
- St. Philip Neri School (Lafayette Hill)
- St. Pio Regional Catholic School
  - Established in 2012 by the merger of Holy Spirit and St. Richard.
- Visitation B.V.M. School

=== Non-Diocesan ===
Independence Mission Schools

The Independence Mission Schools network formed in 2013, operating independently of the archdiocese. Schools are in Philadelphia unless otherwise stated.

- The DePaul Catholic School (Germantown, Philadelphia)
- Holy Cross Catholic School (Mount Airy, Philadelphia)
  - It was established in 1911 In 2012 it had 145 students. That year archdiocese officials stated it would be merged into Our Mother of Consolation, but school officials opposed the plan, partly as they believed the destination school would not be able to accommodate the combined student body.
- Our Mother of Sorrows/St. Ignatius of Loyola
  - Formed from a merger of Our Mother of Sorrows and St. Ignatius of Loyola.
- St. Barnabas School (Southwest Philadelphia)
- SS. Cyril-Philomena School (formerly St. Cyril of Alexandria School) (East Lansdowne, Pennsylvania)
  - It opened in September 1929. The initial enrollment was 375. In December 2005 the archdiocese proposed closing it, but it remained open after community members, inspired by a child with cystic fibrosis who asked for the Make a Wish foundation to save his school, donated $200,000 to keep it open. This was dubbed the "Miracle at St. Cyril." In 2012 the archdiocese proposed closing it again, intending to merge it into St. Andrew School of Upper Darby. However the archdiocese reversed that decision. Instead it became the Independence Mission Schools, not operated by the archdiocese. In 2012 there were 207 students.
- St. Frances Cabrini Regional Catholic School
  - Established in 2012 by the merger of Our Lady of Blessed Sacrament and St. Donato.
- St. Helena-Incarnation School (Olney, Philadelphia)
  - Established in 2012 by the merger of Incarnation of our Lord and St. Helena.
- St. Malachy School – Its second building opened in 2016, giving it more space.
  - Includes a mural dedicated during the 2015 World Meeting of Families
- St. Martin de Porres School
- St. Martin of Tours School (Oxford Circle, Philadelphia)
- St. Raymond of Penafort School
- St. Rose of Lima School
- St. Thomas Aquinas School
- St. Veronica School

Regina Academies

- Regina Angelorum Academy (Ardmore) – Established in 2006 – Grades K-8
- Regina Coeli Academy (Abington) – Established in 2003 in Wyndmoor by Barbara and Paul Henkels. – Grades K-8
- Regina Luminis Academy (Berwyn) – Established in 2007 – Grades K-12 (originally located in Downingtown, Pennsylvania)
- Regina Academy at St. John the Baptist, formerly Saint John the Baptist School (Ottsville) – Established in 2012
  - The building has a capacity of 250 pupils. In 2009 the student body numbered 181 but this declined significantly in the following two years. In 2012 the archdiocese proposed closing the school, but the community appealed. Sulaiman Abdur-Rahman of the Philadelphia Inquirer wrote that the school in 2014 "may have turned the corner."

== Former schools ==
From 1971 until 2011 the archdiocese closed 18 schools. Additional campuses closed in the 2012 Archdiocese of Philadelphia school closings; initially the archdiocese was to close 48 schools that year, including eight in Delaware County. Some of the schools remained open after appeals were made.

In 1963 the archdiocese had 48 Catholic K-8/elementary schools in Delaware County with a total of 39,695 students, which was the highest ever enrollment. From 1971 to 2012, 20 of these schools closed, with ten of them closing from 2003 to 2012. By 2012 there were 28 Catholic K-8/elementary schools in Delaware County with a total of 8,291 students.

=== Former high schools ===
Parochial

- Archbishop Kennedy High School (Conshohocken), 1966–1993 (merged with Bishop Kenrick High School in 1993)
- Archbishop Prendergast High School, established 1956, merged into Bonner & Prendergast Catholic High School
- Bishop Conwell High School (merged with Bishop Egan High School in 1993)
- Bishop Egan High School (merged with Bishop Conwell High School in 1993)
- Bishop Kenrick High School (Norristown), 1955–1993 (merged with Archbishop Kennedy High School in 1993)
- Bishop McDevitt High School, established 1958, closed after 2020–2021 school year
- Cardinal Dougherty High School, 1956–2010
- John W. Hallahan Catholic Girls High School, established 1911; closed after 2020–2021 school year
- Kennedy-Kenrick Catholic High School, 1993–2010 (resulted from merger of Archbishop Kennedy High School and Bishop Kenrick High School) (replaced by Pope John Paul II High School)
- Monsignor Bonner High School, established 1953, merged into Bonner & Prendergast Catholic High School
- Northeast Catholic High School, 1926–2010
- Notre Dame Catholic Girls High School (Moylan), 1935–1981
- Saint Basil Academy (Jenkintown), 1931-2021
- St. James High School for Boys (Chester), 1940-June 1993
  - Alumni bought a building in Eddystone, Pennsylvania to use as a memorabilia center for their former schools. In 2011 the alumni association had 1,550 people who paid dues.
- St. John the Baptist High School, 1921–1956
- Saint John Neumann High School, 1934–2004 (merged with Saint Maria Goretti High School in 2004)
- Saint Maria Goretti High School, 1955–2004 (merged with Saint John Neumann High School in 2004)
- St. Matthew High School (Conshohocken), 1866–1966
- St. Patrick High School (Norristown), 1875–1955
- Saint Pius X High School, 1953–2010 (replaced by Pope John Paul II High School)
- St. Thomas More High School, 1936-1975 – West Philadelphia
  - The closure sparked an interest in the alumni group where little previously existed.
- West Philadelphia Catholic High School for Boys, 1916–1989 (merged with West Philadelphia Catholic Girls High School; demolished in 2009)
- West Philadelphia Catholic Girls High School, 1927–1989 (merged with West Philadelphia Catholic High School for Boys)

=== Former elementary schools ===
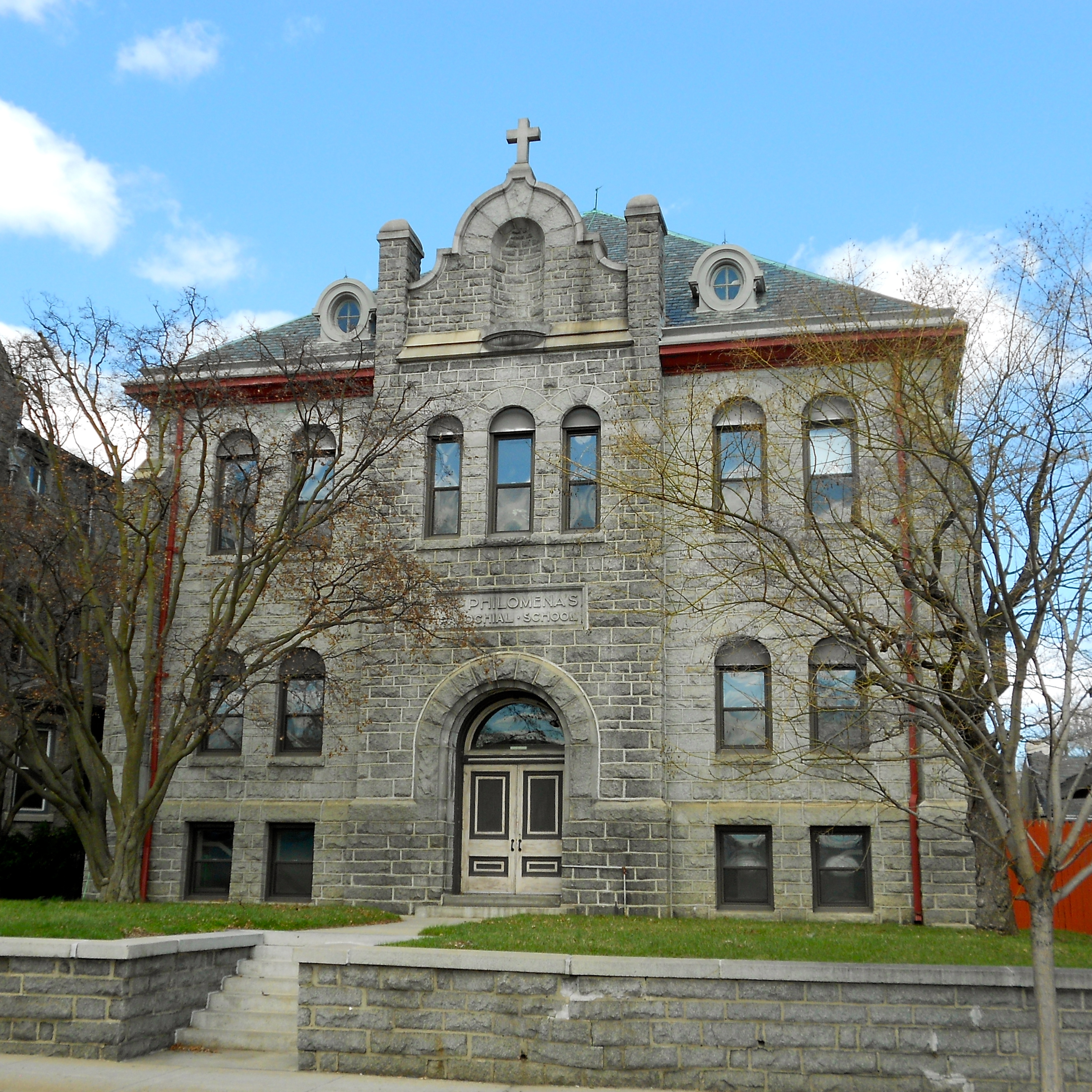
St. Philomena School in Lansdowne closed in 2011

Bucks County

- Assumption B.V.M. School (Feasterville) – Consolidated into St. Katharine Drexel Regional Catholic School in 2012.
- St. Bede the Venerable School (Holland) – Consolidated into St. Katharine Drexel Regional Catholic School in 2012.
- St. John the Evangelist School (Morrisville) – Closed in 2012.

Chester County

- St. Basil the Great School (Kimberton)
  - In 2012 it had 174 students, one of the smallest such figures in the archdiocese, but at the time the archdiocese did not call for its closure.
- St. Monica School (Berwyn) – Closed in 2012.
- St. Patrick School (Kennett Square) – Closed in 2012

Delaware County

- Annunciation B.V.M. School (Havertown) – Merged into Cardinal John Foley Regional School in 2012. The principal stated that an enrollment decline was the reason.
- Holy Saviour-St. John Fisher School (Linwood) – It opened in September 1917. Its service area included Lower Chichester Township, Marcus Hook, and Upper Chichester Township. Its first facility had four classrooms. It moved in 1952. Enrollment later exceeded 900 and the later building had an addition, with a total of 16 classrooms. It was renamed to Holy Saviour-St. John Fisher School several years after the establishment of St. John Fisher Church in Boothwyn, Upper Chichester Township in 1971. It began taking students of Immaculate Conception Parish of Marcus Hook in 1974 and students in Trainer after 1993, the latter when Resurrection School in Chester closed. In 1998 one classroom and a computer lab were added to the campus. It merged into Holy Family Regional Catholic School in 2012. At the end of its life it served three parishes: Holy Saviour, St. John Fisher, and Immaculate Conception.
- Immaculate Conception School (Marcus Hook) – Closed in 1974, with students moved to Holy Savior School.
- Nativity B.V.M. School (Media) – Merged into Mother of Providence Regional Catholic School in 2012. Nativity BVM school opened in 1912, with its last building occupied in 1949. The Nativity BVM school administration chose not to file an appeal against the order to merge. Some parents had lobbied for the continued operation of the school. The archdiocese had originally planned to make Nativity BVM the regional campus, but changed when St. John Chrystosom had appealed against that decision. After the closure, Media Elementary School occupied the campus while renovations of the permanent Media Elementary occurred.
- Our Lady of Charity School (Brookhaven) – Closed in 2011 due to a decrease in the number of students. In the 2010–2011 school year it had 176 students. It had 89 would-be students for the 2011–2012 school year that did not arrive. The Delco Times stated that had the school remained open, it would have had to reduce enrichment services. At least one grade level would have had an enrollment under five. The average class size would have been nine.
- Our Lady of Fatima School (Secane and Ridley Township) – Merged into Our Lady of Angels Regional School in 2012. The building had a capacity of 550. In its final year, the building was 48% utilization.
- Our Lady of Perpetual Help School (Ridley Township, near Morton) – Merged into Our Lady of Angels Regional School in 2012. The building had a capacity of 415. In its final year, the building was 66% utilized.
- Resurrection of Our Lord School (Chester) – Closed in 1993. Students in Trainer, previously assigned to Resurrection of Our Lord, were moved to Holy Saviour-St. John Fisher.
- St. Alice School (Upper Darby) – Closed in 2006
- St. Charles Borromeo School (Upper Darby) – Closed in 2007
  - The school property was later leased by the Upper Darby School District (UDSD) and is now used as Charles Kelly Elementary School. It opened to allow UDSD more space to teach students.
- St. Denis School (Havertown) – Merged into Cardinal John Foley Regional School in 2012. At the time of the merger, the building was 50% utilized.
- St. Gabriel School (Norwood) – The school opened in 1960, with another segment of the building opening in 1962. Former St. Gabriel teacher Denise Crane stated in a letter to the editor to the Delco Times that students came from Norwood, Folcroft, Glenolden, and Prospect Park. Donna Kowal, who began teaching at St. James in 1968, recalled that there were over 1,000 students at the time; each grade level had about 200 students, with about four classes with around 50 students each, but that by 2012 the student population figures had sharply declined. The final enrollment was around 164. It merged into St. James Regional Catholic School in 2012.
- St. John Chrysostom School (Wallingford) – Merged into Mother of Providence Regional Catholic School in 2012. Originally Nativity BVM in Media was to be the location of the merged school, but St. John Chrystosom appealed and the archdiocese changed its decision.
- St. Joseph School (Aston) – St. Joseph opened in 1951 with the church basement being the first school location. The dedicated school building opened with a single floor in 1955 and a second floor added in 1959; the first floor had eight classrooms. The building later received two additional classrooms and a 1987 addition. It was merged into Holy Family Regional Catholic School in 2012.
- St. Joseph School (Collingdale) – Closed in 2010. There were 140 prospective children for the 2010–2011 school year that did not happen when the archdiocese wanted 200. Schools taking former St. Joseph's children were Our Lady of Fatima in Secane, St. Eugene in Primos, and St. Gabriel in Norwood.
- St. Kevin School (Springfield) – The archdiocese closed it in 2011 due to declining enrollment despite advocacy from community members to keep it open. It had 158 students in spring 2011, with parents stating that the number scheduled to attend in the fall of that year was over 130 while the archdiocese stated that number was 93. 150 was the archdiocese's target enrollment. It was one of three Catholic schools in Delaware County to close at that time.
- St. Madeline-St. Rose School (Ridley Park) – Merged into St. James Regional Catholic School in 2012. It had opened circa 1924.
- St. Philomena School (Lansdowne) – Closed in 2011 due to a decrease in the number of students. In the 2010–2011 school year it had 141 students. It had 88 would-be students for the 2011–2012 school year that did not arrive. The Delco Times stated that had the school remained open, it would have had to reduce enrichment services. There would have been four students in the second grade, and three other classes each would have had fewer than 10 students.

Montgomery County

- Conshohocken Catholic School (Conshohocken) – Had "primary" and "elementary" divisions, closed in 2012.
- Epiphany of Our Lord School (Plymouth Meeting) – Consolidated into Holy Rosary Regional School in 2012.
- Holy Trinity Elementary School (lower school in Swedesburg, upper school in Bridgeport) – It served as the parish school for Our Lady of Mount Carmel, Saint Augustine, and Sacred Heart churches. The first two churches are in Bridgeport and previously had a joint St. Augustine-Our Lady of Mount Carmel School. Sacred Heart is a Polish church in Swedesburg.
  - 102 children were scheduled to attend in September 2005. Instead it closed in June 2005.
- Immaculate Conception School (Jenkintown) – Consolidated into St. Joseph the Protector Regional Catholic School in 2012.
- Mother of Divine Providence School (King of Prussia) – Consolidated into Mother Teresa Regional Catholic School in 2012.
- Our Lady Help of Christians School (Abington) – Consolidated into Queen of Angels Regional Catholic School in 2012.
- Our Lady of Victory School (East Norriton Township) – Consolidated into Holy Rosary Regional School in 2012.
- Sacred Heart School (Royersford) – Consolidated into Holy Cross Regional Catholic School in 2012.
- St. Alphonsus School (Maple Glen) – Consolidated into Our Lady of Mercy Regional Catholic School in 2012.
- St. Anthony-St. Joseph School (Ambler) – Consolidated into Our Lady of Mercy Regional Catholic School in 2012.
- St. Catherine of Siena School (Horsham) – Consolidated into Our Lady of Mercy Regional Catholic School in 2012.
- St. David School (Willow Grove) – Consolidated into Queen of Angels Regional Catholic School in 2012.
- St. Eleanor School (Collegeville) – Consolidated into Holy Cross Regional Catholic School in 2012.
- St. Luke the Evangelist School (Glenside) – Consolidated into St. Joseph the Protector Regional Catholic School in 2012.
- St. Maria Goretti School (Hatfield) – Closed in 2012.
- St. Matthias School (Bala Cynwyd) – Closed in 1999
- St. Philip Neri School (East Greenville) – Closed in 2012.
- St. Rose of Lima School (North Wales) – Consolidated into Mater Dei Catholic School in 2012.
- St. Stanislaus School (Lansdale) – Consolidated into Mater Dei Catholic School in 2012.
- St. Teresa of Avila School (West Norriton Township, near Norristown) – Consolidated into Mother Teresa Regional Catholic School in 2012.
- St. Titus School (East Norriton Township) – Consolidated into Holy Rosary Regional School in 2012.

Philadelphia-North

- All Saints Catholic School (Bridesburg)
  - On May 19, 2004, All Saints had 71 students, even though in March 2004 the archdiocese had a projected enrollment for the 2004–2005 school year at 157 students. Due to the low enrollment at All Saints the archdiocese in 2004 temporarily moved All Saints students to Saint John Cantius School, also in Bridesburg. In 2005 the archdiocese decided to establish a regional school as a combination of All Saints and Saint John Cantius.
- Holy Child Catholic School (Manayunk) – Closed in 2012.
  - Holy Child was formed in 2005 by the merger of the Holy Family, St. Lucy, and St. Mary of the Assumption schools. Justin Rigali, the cardinal of the archdiocese, approved the merger plan in January of that year. The following year, St. Jospahat and St. John the Baptist schools also merged. From 2005 to 2012 the enrollment decreased by over 50%. In the 2011–2012 school year the school had 213 students. In 2012 there were plans to merge Holy Child and Saint Bridget into a St. Blaise Regional School at the Holy Child site, but by June 2012 the enrollment for the prospective school was 155, below the 250 the archdiocese required for the school to open.
- Holy Family Catholic School
  - It closed in 2005 and merged into Holy Child.
- Incarnation of Our Lord School – Merged into Incarnation Regional Catholic School in 2012.
- Nativity BVM School – Merged into Our Lady of Port Richmond in 2008.
- Our Lady of Consolation School – Closed in 2012. St. Matthew School in West Mayfair took most of the students.
- Our Lady Help of Christians School – Merged into Our Lady of Port Richmond in 2008.
- Our Lady of Ransom School – Merged into Our Lord at Resurrection Regional Catholic School in 2012. Resurrection took most of the students.
- Pope John Paul II Regional School (Bridesburg) – Merged into Blessed Trinity Regional Catholic School in 2012. It did not appeal the merger.
- Resurrection of Our Lord School – Merged into Resurrection Regional Catholic School in 2012.
- St. Adalbert School – Merged into Our Lady of Port Richmond in 2008.
- St. Bartholomew School (Lower Northeast Philadelphia)
  - As of May 3, 2005, 145 children already attending were scheduled to attend for the 2005–2006 school year. Instead the archdiocese decided to close the school effective June 2005. Students were redirected to Pope John Paul II Regional School, St. Matthew School, and St. Timothy School.
- St. Bridget School (East Falls) – Closed in 2012.
  - As time passed, the tuition increased, and class sizes decreased from around 40 to around 20. From 2005 to 2012 the enrollment increased by 16%. In the 2011–2012 school year the school had 198 students. The Saint Bridget community argued against the proposal to merge the school and Holy Child at the Holy Child site. They filed appeals with the archdiocese, who rejected them. Saint Bridget School permanently closed in 2012. The creation of St. Blaise never occurred.
- St. Helena School – Merged into St. Helena – Incarnation Regional Catholic School in 2012.
- St. Joachim School
- Saint John the Baptist Parish Elementary School
  - In 2006 the budget was planned for an enrollment of 225 but the enrollment was only 208 in the beginning of the start of the school year in 2005, and by February 2006 it was down to 205. That year the archdiocese announced the school was closing. In 2006 it merged into Holy Child.
- St. John Cantius School (Bridesburg)
  - On May 19, 2004 All Saints had 145 students, matching the projected enrollment for the 2004–2005 school year. Due to the low enrollment at All Saints the archdiocese in 2004 temporarily moved students at All Saints School, also at Bridesburg, to Saint John Cantius. In 2005 the archdiocese decided to make a regional school combining All Saints and Saint John Cantius.
- St. Jospahat School
  - Circa January 2005 the leadership initially asked the archdiocese to allow their school to stay open despite difficulties, but by March reversed course due to insufficient enrollment. In 2006 it merged into Holy Child. The majority of students remaining went to Holy Child.
- St. Lucy School
  - It closed in 2005 and merged into Holy Child.
- St. Mary of the Assumption School
  - It closed in 2005 and merged into Holy Child.
- St. Timothy School – Merged into Blessed Trinity Regional Catholic School in 2012. It did not appeal the merger.
- St. William School – Closed in 2012.

Philadelphia-South

- Annunciation B.V.M. School – Merged into St. Anthony of Padua in 2012.
- Epiphany of Our Lord School – Merged into Our Lady of Hope School in 2012.
  - In 2012 the archdiocese considered merging the school into the Stella Maris site, but instead decided to merge Our Lady of Mount Carmel and Sacred Heart of Jesus into Epiphany.
- Holy Spirit School – Merged into St. Pio Regional Catholic School in 2012.
  - In 2012 the archdiocese considered merging the school into the Stella Maris site, but instead made it into a regional school with St. Richard.
- King of Peace School – Grays Ferry
  - In 1999 it had 209 students, with the percentages of white, black, and Asian students being about 50, 42, and 8. It closed in 1999; It and St. Aloysius School consolidated with St. Gabriel School to form Our Lady of the Angels School (at St. Gabriel). In 2012 the former King of Peace building began to be uses for Alcorn's middle school classes.
- Our Lady of Lourdes School – Closed in 2012.
- Our Lady of Mount Carmel School – Merged into Our Lady of Hope School in 2012.
  - In 2012 the archdiocese considered merging the school into the Stella Maris site, but instead decided to merge it into Epiphany of Our Lord.
- Our Lady of the Blessed Sacrament School – Merged into St. Frances Cabrini School in 2012.
- Our Mother of Sorrows School
  - It was one of the designated schools of St. Agatha – St. James Church.
- Sacred Heart of Jesus School – Merged into Our Lady of Hope School in 2012.
  - In 2012 the archdiocese considered merging the school into the Stella Maris site, but instead decided to merge it into Epiphany of Our Lord.
- Saint Anne School – It had about 1,000 students in the 1970s. It was closed in June 2011, due to falling enrollment. NHS Human Services School at St. Annes, which caters to children with autism, opened in its place in 2015.
- St. Aloysius School – South Philadelphia
  - Closed in 1999; it and King of Peace School consolidated with St. Gabriel School to form Our Lady of the Angels School (at St. Gabriel).
- St. Carthage School
- St. Charles Borromeo School
  - In 1976 the school had about 546 students, while in 1999 it was down to 273. In 1999 the archdiocese considered eventually merging the school with St. Thomas Aquinas School.
- St. Cyprian School – In 2011 the archdiocese announced the closure of St. Cyprian Catholic School, as its student numbers had declined.
- St. Donato School – Merged into St. Frances Cabrini School in 2012.
- St. Edmond School
  - Circa 1975, it had 1,064 students. In 1999, it had 222 students. It closed in 1999.
- St. Gabriel School – Greys Ferry
  - It became Our Lady of the Angels School in 1999 after a consolidation with two other schools. It, as St. Gabriel, became an Independence Mission School in 2012 (an action which at the time prevented its closure), and then closed completely in 2021. St. Thomas Aquinas School was to take the majority of St. Gabriel students.
- St. Ignatius of Loyola School
  - It was established in 1923 and moved into another building in 1967. It was one of the designated schools of St. Agatha – St. James Church.
- St. Michael School
- St. Nicholas of Tolentine School – Merged into St. Anthony of Padua Catholic Regional School in 2012.
- St. Paul School
  - In the 1960s, it had 800 students. In 1999, it had 117 students. It closed in 1999.
- St. Richard School (South Philadelphia) – Merged into St. Pio Regional Catholic School in 2012.
  - In 2012 the archdiocese considered merging the school into the Stella Maris site, but kept the campus open after the school community appealed; it became a regional school with Holy Spirit.
- Transfiguration of Our Lord School

== West Philadelphia ==
- St. Barbara School – Closed in 1998

St. Callistus school

St. Donato

Transfiguration

- 2012 Archdiocese of Philadelphia school closings
