= Port Richmond, Philadelphia =

Port Richmond
- Neighborhood
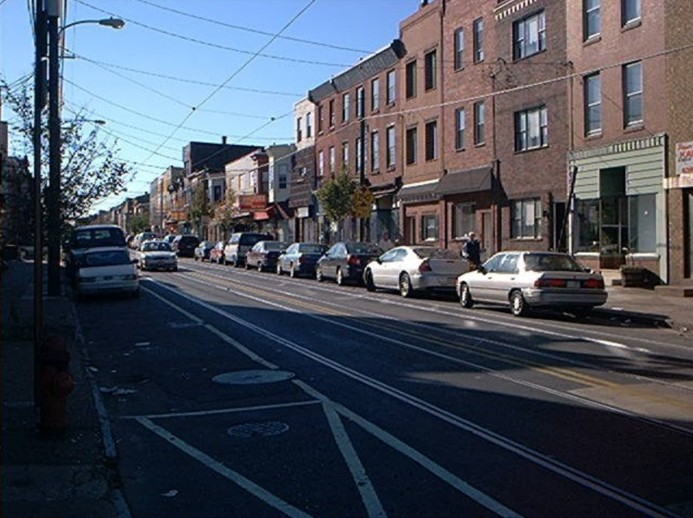
- Richmond Street, one of the area's main thoroughfares (2005).

- Location within Philadelphia
- Country: United States
- State: Pennsylvania
- County: Philadelphia
- City: Philadelphia
- Area codes: 215, 267 and 445

Port Richmond is a neighborhood in the River Wards section of Philadelphia, Pennsylvania, United States. It is notable for its large Polish immigrant and Polish American community, and it has been known as the Little Poland of Philadelphia. The neighborhood is also home to a large Irish American community and sizable German, Lithuanian, Italian, and Puerto Rican communities, along with a historic Jewish community, as represented in the various churches and organizations. In more recent years, a sizable Albanian community has moved in. Port Richmond's ZIP code is 19134. A small portion of the neighborhood, north of Castor Avenue, falls into the 19137 ZIP code.

The neighborhood is bounded by the Frankford Creek to the northeast, Lehigh Avenue to the southwest, the Delaware River to the east, and Kensington and Allegheny Avenues to the northwest.

While many locals often refer to Port Richmond as simply Richmond, there is a specific area named Richmond consisting of the most northeastern section of the neighborhood (the area north of Allegheny Avenue up to Frankford Creek). Adjacent neighborhoods are Bridesburg to the northeast, Juniata to the north, Harrowgate to the northwest and Kensington to the south.

== History ==
=== Colonial and coal eras ===
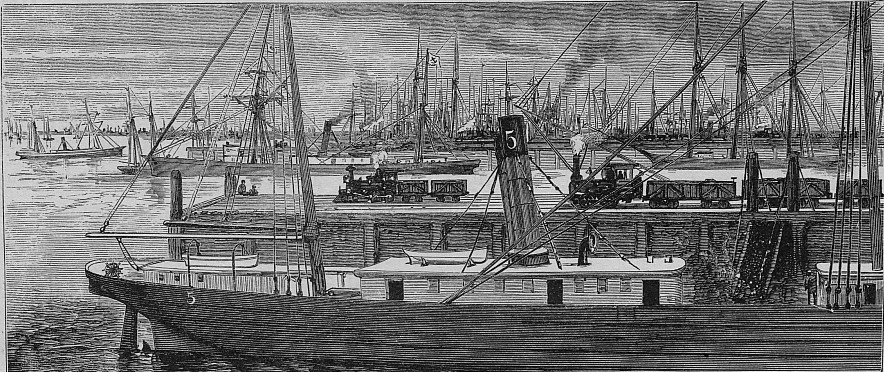
Colliers at Port Richmond circa 1875

In colonial times, most of today's Port Richmond was owned by Anthony Palmer, the founder of Philadelphia's Kensington neighborhood. Palmer put together various parcels of land starting around 1704. He named the estate he built "Hope Farm", and in 1729 sold this estate to William Ball. Palmer then purchased the old Fairman Mansion estate which bordered on the south of "Hope Farm" and built his town of Kensington. Over time, some manufacturing began at the southern end of "Hope Farm" and this area became known as Balltown. There were glass and textile concerns located there during the later part of the 18th century.

During the 1800s, with the advent of the steam engine aboard ships, Port Richmond was a major terminus for colliers, which received coal from the Reading Railroad facility at the port, and transported it to steamships at other locations. Colliers, as well as other merchant and military ships, continued to visit Port Richmond for coal until after World War I, when coal-burning steam engines on ships were replaced by more modern oil and diesel engines.

=== Early 20th century ===
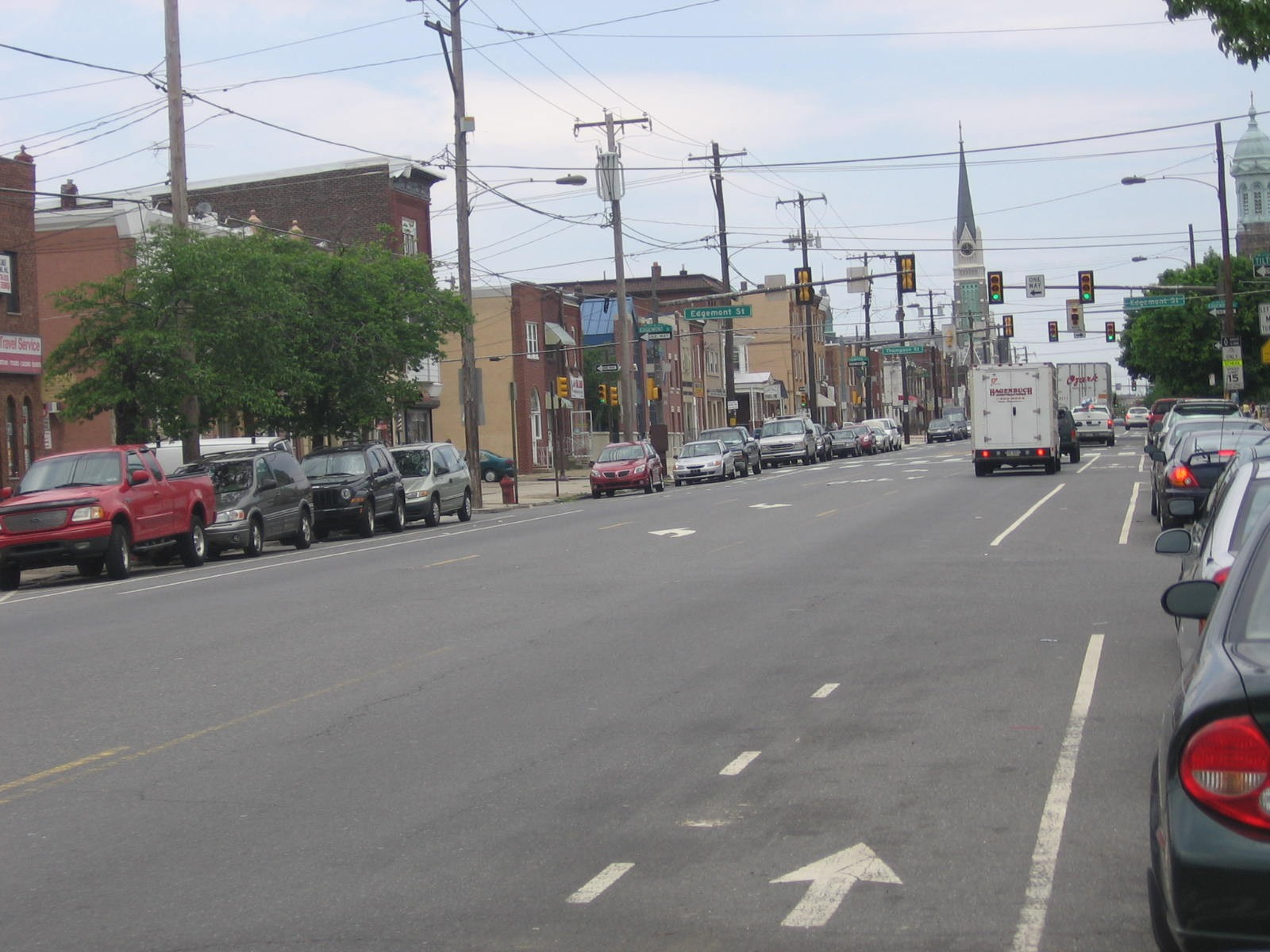
Allegheny Avenue looking west from Richmond Street

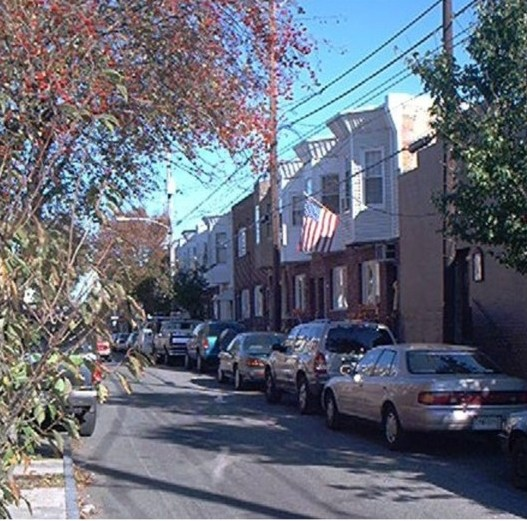
Salmon Street, a typical area side street

Port Richmond, at the beginning of the century, was a working-class neighborhood, and most workers simply walked to their nearby workplaces with lunch pail in hand. Cars were not common and those who had them stored them in stables. Stables for horses and cars were located in various parts of the area. Streets—unlike now—were generally free of parked vehicles, allowing hucksters and other vendors space to easily proceed down the narrow side streets with their horse and wagon on a daily basis.

European immigrants arrived in large numbers and lost no time in scrimping and working long hours to earn sufficient money to purchase modest row homes, such as those along Chatham Street. Usually, the only heat in such homes was provided by a coal-fired range in a tiny kitchen. Some comfort could be had in the fact that these homes contained tiny rooms, generally two downstairs and two upstairs, and were easy to keep warm from the heat of the kitchen range. Such homes were generally twelve feet wide, and the entire length of the house was about twenty four feet. Cellars consisted of plain dirt floors. The fact that the homes were row homes, which were joined by common walls, helped them retain heat during cold winter spells. Only the fronts and backs of each home presented themselves to the coldness of winter. Why the cellars along Chatham Street, for example, contained dirt floors is not entirely clear, unless it was because the cellars were used simply for wood or coal storage or because cement was not a widely used product at the time.

A ton of coal sold at the time for about four or five dollars and would be sufficient for the entire winter. However, most people bought coal by the bucket from a street peddler who came by daily in his horse-drawn carriage. The outsides of these homes consisted of wooden steps and brick sidewalks. Since this type of housing was of economic construction, the bricks in the sidewalk were laid in a crosshatch pattern in sand. When bricks were used in construction of the walls of the house, the mortar mix was made from lime and sand.

Chatham Street homes were constructed in the late 19th century. Later, row homes in Port Richmond were generally sixteen feet wide and contained a cemented cellar, a coal-fired heater, and an upstairs bath for a total of for a total of five or six rooms. Such newer homes, like those on Almond Street, for example, increased in size as prosperity improved for the residents. These homes were palatial when compared with Chatham Street homes, and contained a coal-fired furnace that provided central heat. They generally consisted of three bedrooms and a bath upstairs, and also a living room, dining room, and a kitchen downstairs. (See the Salmon Street photo for examples of this type of row home.)

Port Richmond residents were frugal and bought produce from the many street vendors who came by daily with their horse-drawn carts, loaded with fresh vegetables from nearby farms, located not very far away. Housewives could buy cabbage, cucumbers, potatoes, apples, and other vegetables by the bushel and store or preserve them for the winter. Gas mains were installed in the neighborhood by the city of Philadelphia, and gas was metered into each home for cooking and illumination. The meter was in the basement, and required someone in the household to occasionally feed it coins to keep the gas flowing. On Port Richmond sidewalks, tall gas lamps illuminated the streets. During each evening a lamplighter would come by to light the street lamps by igniting them with a very long device he held up in his hands.

=== Wars ===
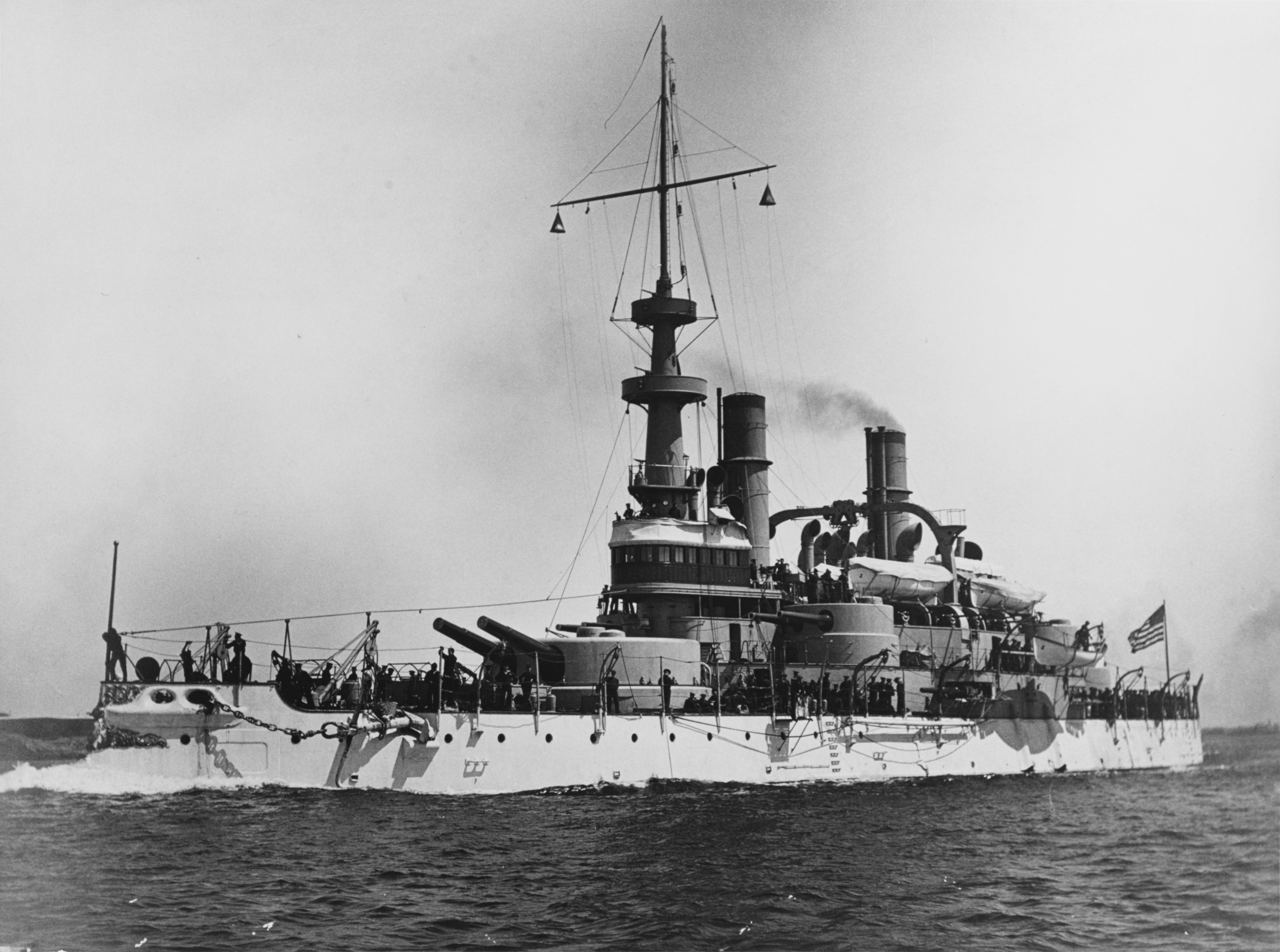
USS Indiana, the first modern battleship was built at Cramp Shipyard in 1891

Port Richmond played a major maritime role in American wars from the American Revolution and onward through World War II. The William Cramp & Sons Shipbuilding Company, established in 1830 and located nearby, provided skilled work for local workers, who built the battleships USS Indiana and the USS Massachusetts for the Spanish–American War in the late 19th century. The shipyard, and others in the area, also built surface ships during the American Civil War—such as USS Kensington—and during World War I, and World War II when Cramps' workforce employed 18,000 skilled workers.

During World War II, Port Richmond contained numerous docks and wharves for the loading and unloading of war cargo. In addition, the riverside area contained numerous ancillary facilities, such as warehouses, workshops, and offices. The Reading Railroad had used the port as a terminus for the transfer of coal, and, during the war, railroad service remained a vital function of the port, for its ability to quickly transfer goods to and from the port. The old Orinoka Mills in Richmond, was used as a training and wartime production facility in association with Mastbaum during the war. Today, the port is smaller than it was in World War II, although some marine services still remain, such as the Tioga Marine Terminal at Tioga and Delaware Avenue.

=== Railroad derailments ===
Frankford Junction in Port Richmond is an important point on the Northeast Corridor rail artery, as well as being the site of several major rail accidents. On September 6, 1943, the northbound Congressional Limited, a nonstop Pennsylvania Railroad passenger train, bound from Washington, D.C., to New York City, derailed near Port Richmond, killing 79 people and injuring 117 others. On May 12, 2015, at the same site, an Amtrak train derailed.

== Culture ==
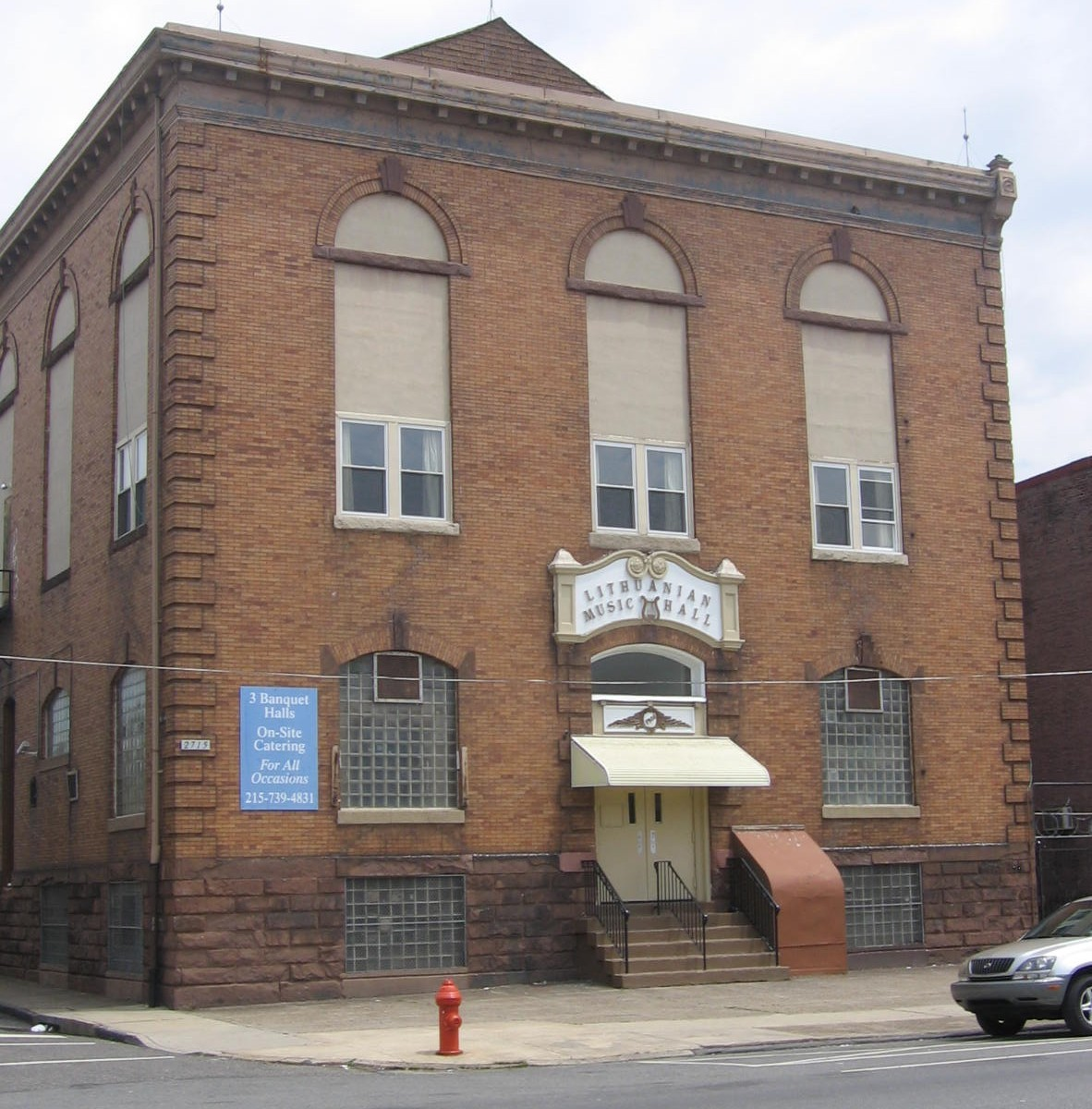
The Lithuanian Music Hall on Allegheny Avenue in Port Richmond

Port Richmond is a vibrant neighborhood with a deep and proud cultural history encompassing several centuries.

Stores, some located down side streets, are small and numerous because of the nature of the existing row home architecture where row homes and homefronts have been converted to use as stores. However, many of these stores and drinking establishments offer food, drink and charm which is unique to the neighborhood.

Many Port Richmond homes have been refurbished and are now occupied increasingly by younger people, who no longer walk to work at the once bustling Port Richmond docks or to the tanneries and looms of their predecessors, but are employed in various parts of the city of Philadelphia, returning home in the evenings to the comfort of their picturesque neighborhood. Unfortunately, as the narrow side streets are a product of the horse-and-buggy era, car parking is a problem.

The Russell H. Conwell School, George L. Horn School, John Paul Jones Junior High School, James Martin School, Thomas Powers School, Richmond School, and Francis E. Willard School are listed on the National Register of Historic Places.

=== Polish heritage ===
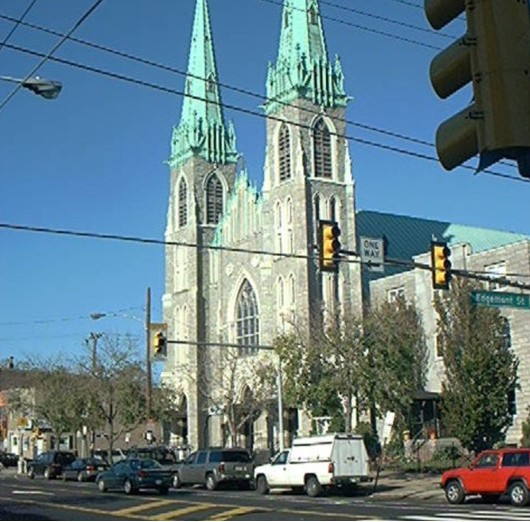
St. Adalbert Church on Allegheny Avenue.

There are many Polish delis and restaurants throughout the neighborhood, evidence of the Polish ethnic background of the neighborhood. The neighborhood continues to attract Polish immigrants.

During the late 19th and early 20th centuries when immigration was at its peak in Philadelphia, Polish people settled on farms in Port Richmond. Soon, the Polish population increased massively, which produced rowhouses with their notable marble steps, and creation of Saint Adalbert Church, which was built in Polish Cathedral style.

Today, there are a number of restaurants and stores in the area of Richmond Street and Allegheny Avenue that cater to the Polish-American community. The former Krakus Market on Richmond Street offered a large selection of Polish and Eastern European foods, including a variety of Kielbasa, Polish canned goods, Polish newspapers and various types of Polish pastries, such as Babka, Chrusciki and Paczki. Philadelphia's award-winning Polish American String Band which marches in the Mummers Parade down Broad Street on New Year's Day, sometimes marches and struts through the neighborhood, as on Port Richmond's Memorial Day celebration.

A half-dozen blocks west on Allegheny from Richmond Street, there is an ancient park, Campbell's Square, where neighborhood children play and where special community events are sometimes held.

Despite its strong Polish roots, where even now, many still speak the language in ordinary conversation, the area has also served other nationalities, such as the Lithuanians. In addition to the area's Polish ethnicity, Lithuanians—who have historically always been strongly linked with the Polish nation—hold their festivals and dances, as well as catered affairs for the community, at the Lithuanian Dance Hall on Allegheny Avenue, just a few blocks west of Richmond Street. The Lithuanian Music Hall is currently the home of the Theatre Company of Port Richmond, a community theater providing entertainment to the community since 1984.

== Demographics ==
Port Richmond is largely a working-class Polish American community, and has been so for decades. As of the 2010 Census, Port Richmond was 76.7% non Hispanic white, 14.7% Hispanic of any race, 5.8% non Hispanic black, 1.8% Asian, and 1.1% all other. A more recent U.S. Census estimate released in 2014 for the year 2013., indicates that the Port Richmond community is much more diverse. For example, zip code 19134 with 60,000 inhabitants, has 23,000 Puerto Ricans and 5,550 Polish Americans. Zipcode 19125 has 1,400 Polish Americans. In Port Richmond, as in every old ethnic enclave in Philadelphia, demographic change is occurring at a rapid pace.

== Principal thoroughfares ==
Richmond Street stores.

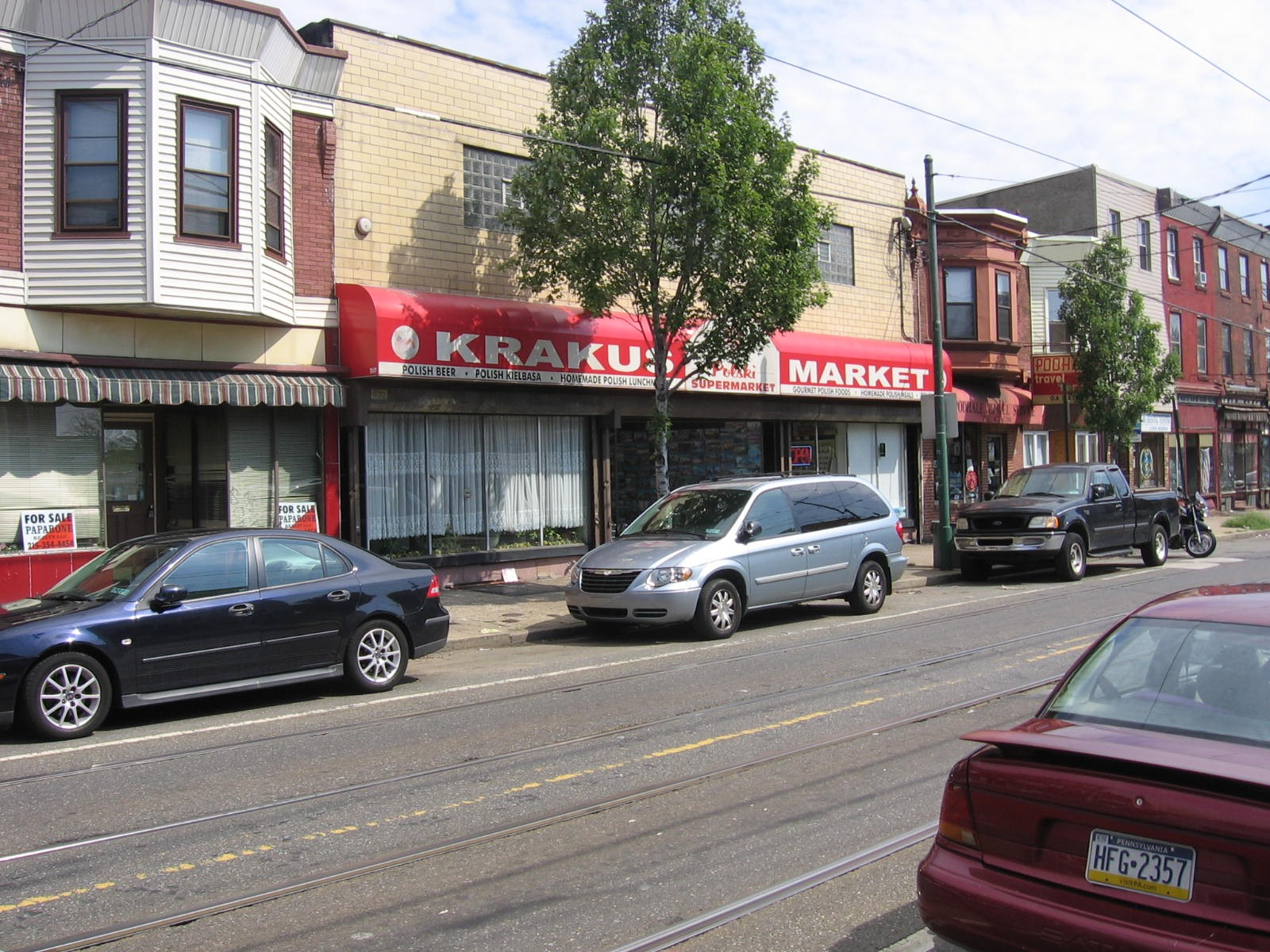
Krakus Polish supermarket in Port Richmond

The main thoroughfares of Port Richmond are Allegheny Avenue, running east–west, Richmond Street and Aramingo Avenue, both running north–south.

Allegheny Avenue is the location of the largest Catholic church in the area Nativity B.V.M. as well as Our Lady Help of Christians Church. Their children, along with St. Adalbert's attend Our Lady of Port Richmond Regional Catholic School.

Richmond Street, south of Allegheny Avenue, runs parallel to Interstate 95 and contains a large number of Polish shops which serve the local Polish community. Italian and Polish bakeries bake fresh bread and various traditional pastries and meats.

Port Richmond is also historically noted for the trolley tracks that run down Richmond Street (see photo at top of page) along the Delaware River. The trolleys have recently been restored and are running again.

Center City Philadelphia, with its metropolitan stores and historic tourist attractions, is not far away. There is a southbound entrance to Interstate 95 on Allegheny Avenue, a half block east of Richmond Street, and I-95 is a quick entrance to Center City Philadelphia, areas of South Philadelphia or the Philadelphia International Airport. On the other hand, to see the dynamic structures of Old City, Philadelphia, a drive to center city could be made south on Richmond Street and continuing on south on Delaware Avenue, providing a view of what remains of the ship terminals that once made the Port of Philadelphia a bustling seaport.

The Port Richmond Trail is part of the East Coast Greenway.

== Religion ==
Nativity of the Blessed Virgin Mary Catholic Church opened in 1882, and two others later opened: St. Adalbert in Philadelphia and Our Lady Help of Christians (1898). On July 1, 2019, St. Adalbert and Nativity BVM and Saint George Parish, merged into a single congregation. St. Adalbert was chosen as the parish church of the merged Nativity BVM, which was renamed St. John Paul II Parish. Our Lady Help of Christians was closed in 2018.

== Education ==
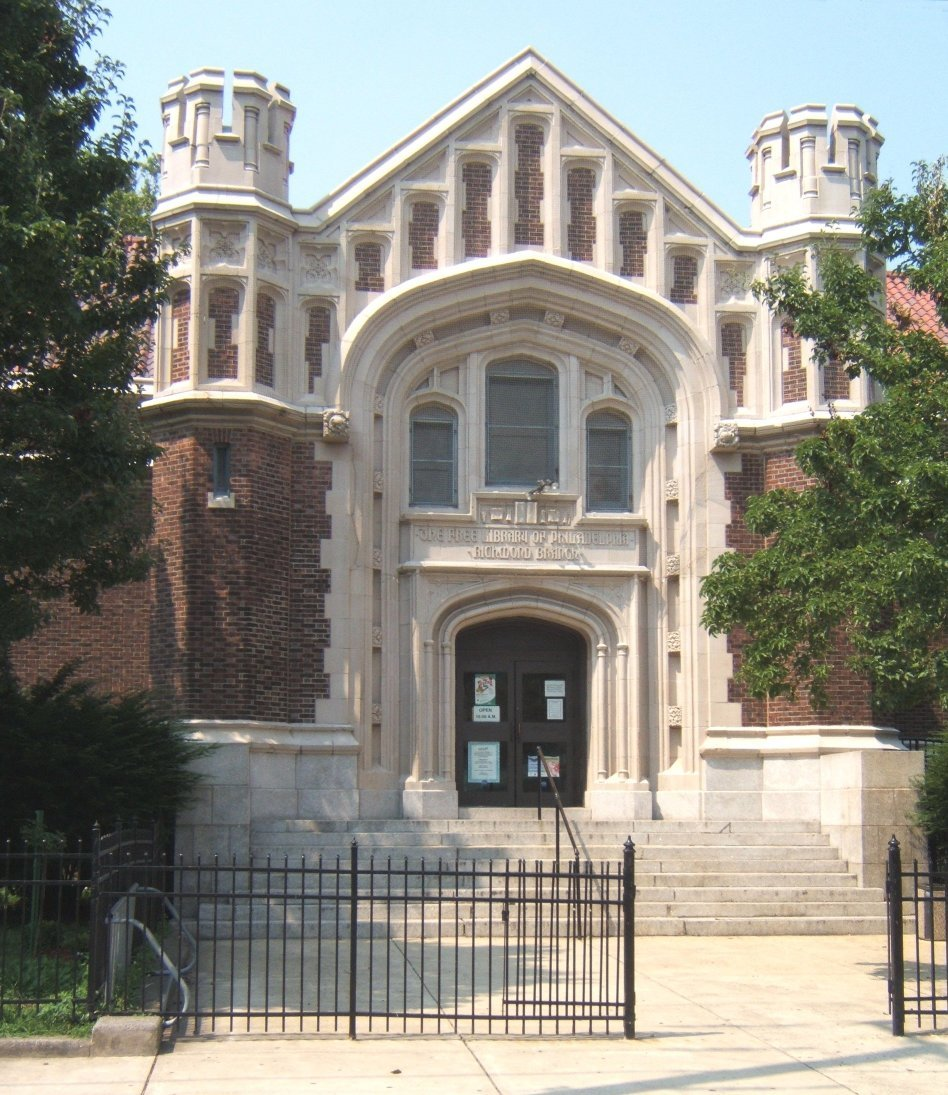
Richmond Branch

The School District of Philadelphia operates public schools.

Our Lady of Port Richmond Regional School was established in September 2008 by the merger of Nativity B.V.M, Our Lady Help of Christians, and St. Adalbert. Each of the predecessor schools had enrollments of about 200. The 2008 economic downturn prompted the schools to merge. There were 545 students in the merged school in 2008, but the continued economic malaise resulted in declining enrollments. By 2016 enrollment was at about 400 and recovering.

The Free Library of Philadelphia operates the Richmond Branch. In November 2024 heating issues meant the library had closed on a temporary basis. The building experienced more issues, and it had to close after a brief reopening due to a lack of structural integrity in the roof.

== Notable people ==
- Author and screenwriter Joe Augustyn attended St. Adalbert's, then Philadelphia's Central High and The American Film Institute in Los Angeles. He wrote and produced the cult horror film Night of the Demons, and now writes novels.
- Frank Hoerst, famous baseball player. He attended North Catholic High School and played for the Philadelphia Phillies.
- Jack McTamney, singer, songwriter and performer.
- Joe O'Rourke, Phillies player and Major League Baseball scout. In retirement he ran O'Rourke's Shortstop Cafe in the neighborhood until his death in 1990.
- Zachary Rehl, Philadelphia chapter president of the neo-fascist group Proud Boys and convicted seditionist.

== See also ==
- Northeast Philadelphia
- Port of Philadelphia
- Polish Cathedral style
- Gwiazda, Polish-American newspaper published in Port Richmond, 1902–1985
