= Gwiazda (Philadelphia) =

Weekly newspaper published in Philadelphia, Pennsylvania

Gwiazda (Polish for “Star”) was a weekly newspaper published in Philadelphia, Pennsylvania in Polish from 1902 to 1985, with an English section gradually introduced, starting in 1958.

The founder and publisher was the Polish-born Stephan Nowaczyk, a printer who immigrated to Philadelphia in the 1870s and started the newspaper in 1902 in his home in Port Richmond with used equipment. When he died in 1923, his wife, Francis, became the publisher, until 1935, when their daughter, Gertrude, became the last publisher, until 1985 when the paper was dissolved.
