= Thomas Powers School =

- U.S. National Register of Historic Places
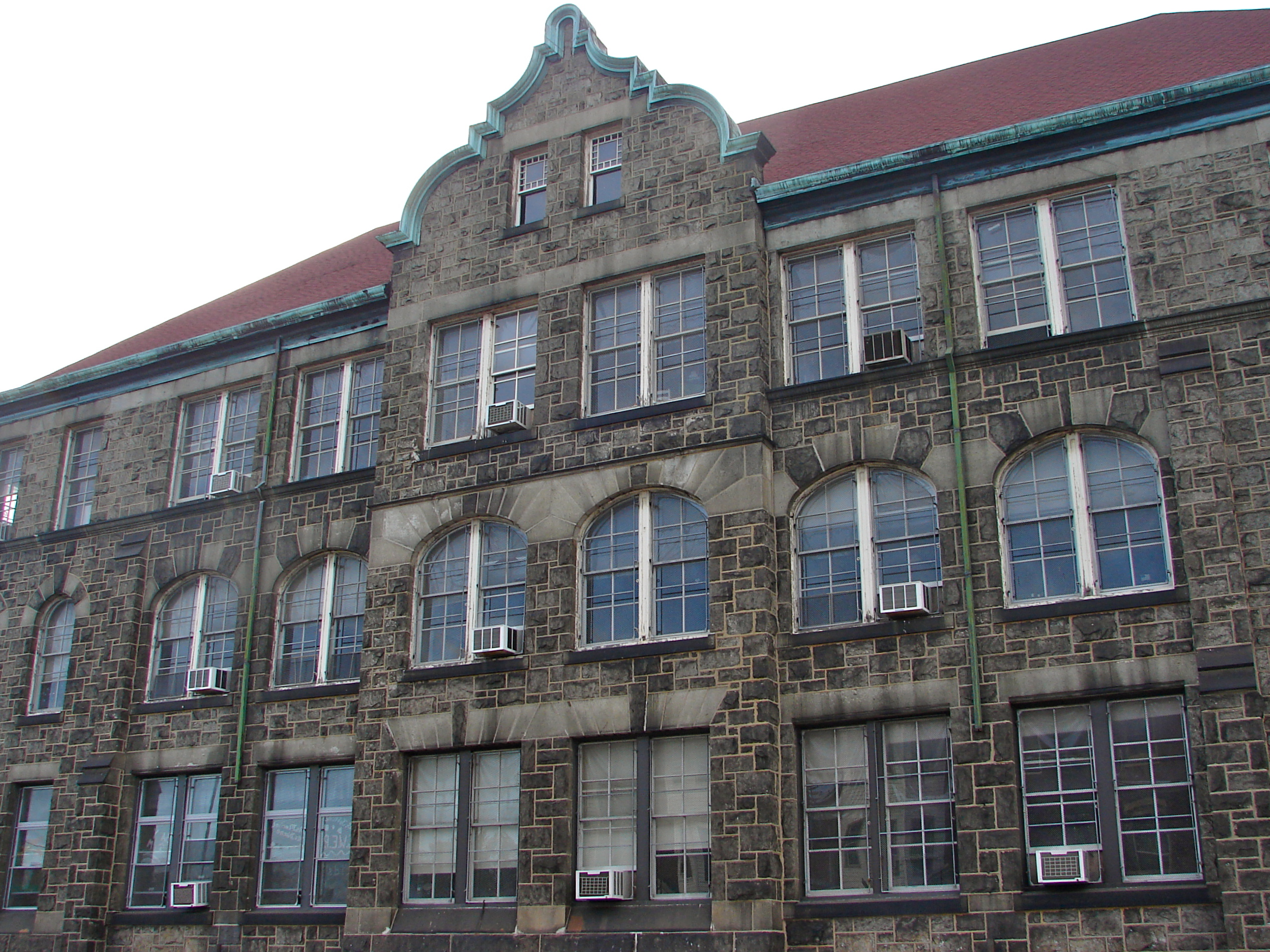
- Thomas Powers School, September 2010

- Location within Philadelphia Location within Pennsylvania Location within the United States
- Location: Frankford Ave. and Somerset St., Philadelphia, Pennsylvania, United States
- Coordinates: 39.9888°N 75.1198°W
- Area: 1 acre (0.40 ha)
- Built: 1899–1900
- Built by: J.E. & A.J. Pencock
- Architect: J.W. Anshutz
- Architectural style: Romanesque
- MPS: Philadelphia Public Schools TR
- NRHP reference No.: 86003319
- Added to NRHP: December 4, 1986

The Thomas Powers School is a historic school building that is located in the Port Richmond neighborhood of Philadelphia, Pennsylvania, United States.

It was added to the National Register of Historic Places in 1986.

== History and architectural features ==
Built between 1899 and 1900, this historic structure is a three-story, square, granite building with basement. Designed in the Romanesque style, it sits on a stone foundation and features a projecting round arched tower, stepped Flemish gable, and hipped roof with large projecting chimneys.
