= Jack McTamney =

American singer-songwriter

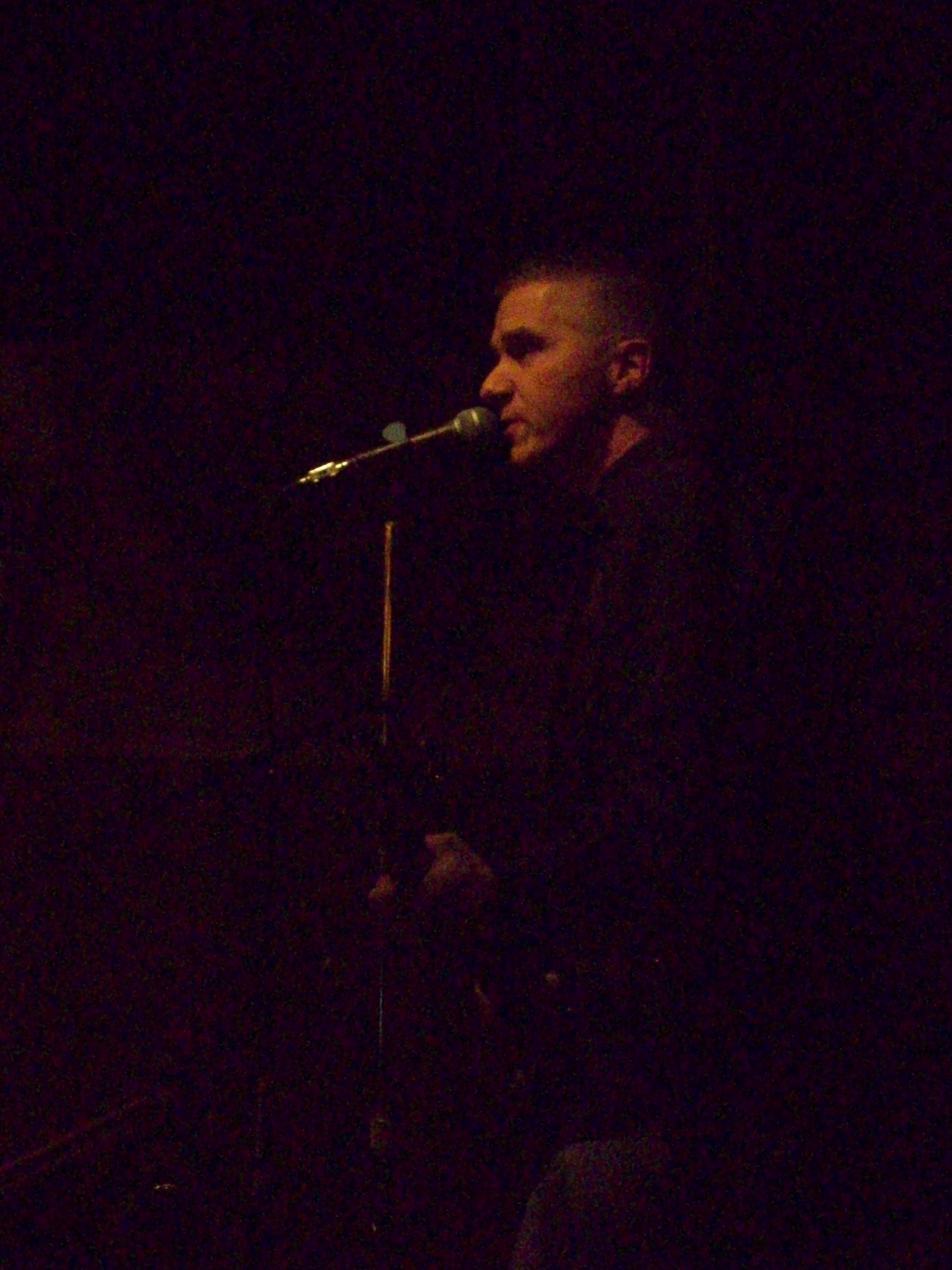
- McTamney in concert, February 2009

Background information
- Birth name: John McTamney
- Born: April 10, 1963 (age 61); Philadelphia, PA, U.S.
- Genres: Rock, art rock, hard rock, power pop, progressive rock, British beat, jazz
- Occupation(s): Musician, singer-songwriter, musical arranger
- Instrument(s): Guitar, vocals, bass guitar, harmonica, mandolin, ukulele,
- Years active: 1984–present

John "Jack" McTamney (born April 10, 1963) is an American singer, songwriter and performer. Born in the Port Richmond neighborhood of Philadelphia, PA, and the youngest of 6 children, he has a career spanning over two decades, performing both solo and in groups such as the Jack McTamney Band, and The Tonebenders.

== History ==
As per the biography provided on Jack's MySpace page

:Abandoned as a small child, Jack was adopted by a roving pack of stray dogs who protected and took care of him. Jack and his adopted "family" soon took residence in an unused rusted-out boxcar. Together they dined on fish from the river, rat meat, and the occasional rabbit. After a while, Jack befriended an old railroad brakeman called "Stewbone." Stewbone taught Jack the rhythmic style of guitar that he'd developed as a young man listening to the clickety-clack of the trains rolling to the next stop. One day, Stewbone told Jack, "Boy, I done taught ya everythang... the rest is in ya. Go on an' find it!" Stewbone disappeared soon after this, but suddenly Jack was writing these incredible songs. Now folks come from far and wide to hear Jack play his songs, or to talk about life, or just to taste the "best damn rat burgers west of the Mississippi"! ..Halfway to Nowhere CD..

The real Jack McTamney was born to Joseph McTamney and Mary McTamney (née Shields), the youngest of six children (Joseph, Mary Ellen, Francis, Gerard, and Bernadette). His brother Francis (Fran) taught him to play his first chords, and his other siblings, Mary Ellen and Gerard (Jerry), chipped in to buy him his first guitar when he was 15. He attended Northeast Catholic High School, and during that time, became interested in the teachings of Meher Baba, attributing this to his influence by the music of Pete Townshend and The Who.

Cuts from Jack's first album, "Halfway to NowHere" were profiled on the Iain Anderson's Radio Scotland programme on the BBC on March 30, 2011.The Philadelphia alternative newspaper, The Philadelphia City Paper, profiled Jack in its February 2, 2012 issue. This prompted a reunion of the Jack McTamney Band, now playing as Jack McTamney and the Tonebenders, at the Dawson Street Pub on February 3, 2012.

== Band members ==
Jack routinely worked with several artists, depending on where and when he was playing.

- Guitar, vocals: Jim Fogarty
- Bass, guitar, vocals: Vince Reed
- Percussion: Roger Cox
- Bass: Mike Vogelman
- Guitar, vocals: Ken Kweder
- Bass: Ken Amato
- Guitar, vocals: Francis McTamney
