= Monsignor Bonner and Archbishop Prendergast High School =

Private school in Drexel Hill, Pennsylvania, United States

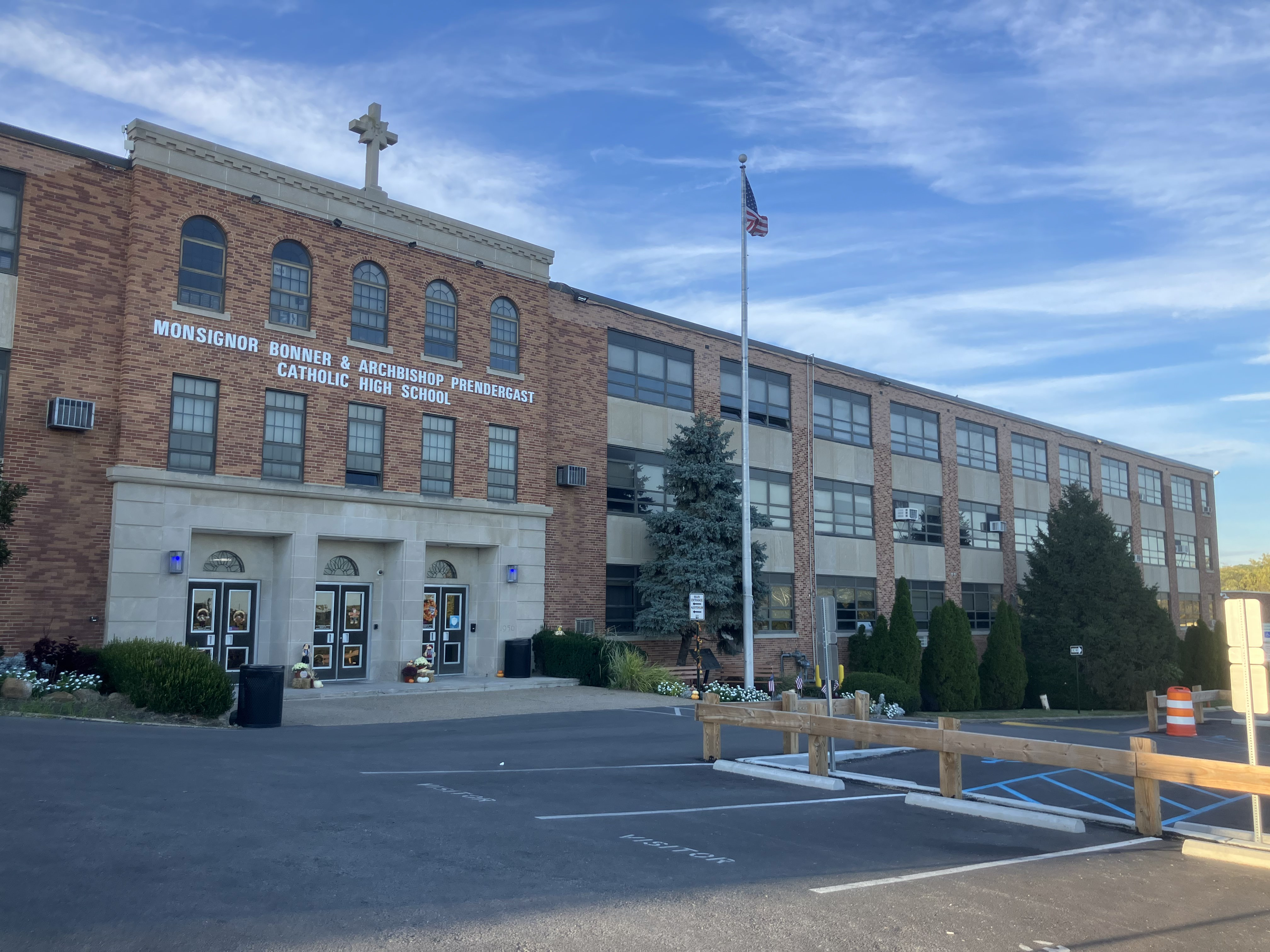
- Monsignor Bonner and Archbishop Prendergast High School in 2025

Location
- 403 North Lansdowne Avenue, Drexel Hill, Pennsylvania; Drexel Hill, Pennsylvania, (Delaware County) 19026; United States; 39°57′12″N 75°16′53″W

Information
- Type: Private school
- Motto: "Purity - Integrity - Loyalty"
- Religious affiliations: Roman Catholic; Order of Saint Augustine
- Established: 1953
- President: John Cooke
- Principal: Andrea Ciliberti
- Grades: 9–12
- Enrollment: 830 (2022)
- Colors: Green, Gold, White, & Black Garnet, Grey, Black, & White
- Mascot: Monsignor Bonner: Friar; Archbishop Prendergast: Panda
- Nickname: Monsignor Bonner: Friars; Archbishop Prendergast: Pandas
- Team name: Monsignor Bonner: Bonner Friars; Archbishop Prendergast: Prendie Pandas
- Rival: Cardinal O'Hara High School; Archbishop John Carroll High School
- Accreditation: Middle States Association of Colleges and Schools
- Newspaper: Bonner Bulletin
- Yearbook: BonAire
- Alumni: 18,000
- Website: www.bonnerprendie.com

Monsignor Bonner and Archbishop Prendergast High School, commonly known as Bonner–Prendie, is a coeducational Catholic secondary school of the Archdiocese of Philadelphia, located in Upper Darby Township, Pennsylvania.

The school was originally two schools on one campus, with Monsignor Bonner High School, an all-boys' school founded in 1956, and Archbishop Prendergast High School, an all-girls' school founded in 1953. In 2012, the two schools merged as a co-ed institution.

== History ==
The land in which Monsignor Bonner and Archbishop Prendergast High School is located was originally owned by Christopher Fallon, who built a mansion on the site in 1850. In 1882, the mansion was bought by Colonel Anthony J. Drexel. The mansion was situated on what was then called the "hill of Drexel", which led to the area becoming known as Drexel Hill. In 1908, the mansion burned to the ground with only the gatehouse, which had served as servants' quarters, remaining.

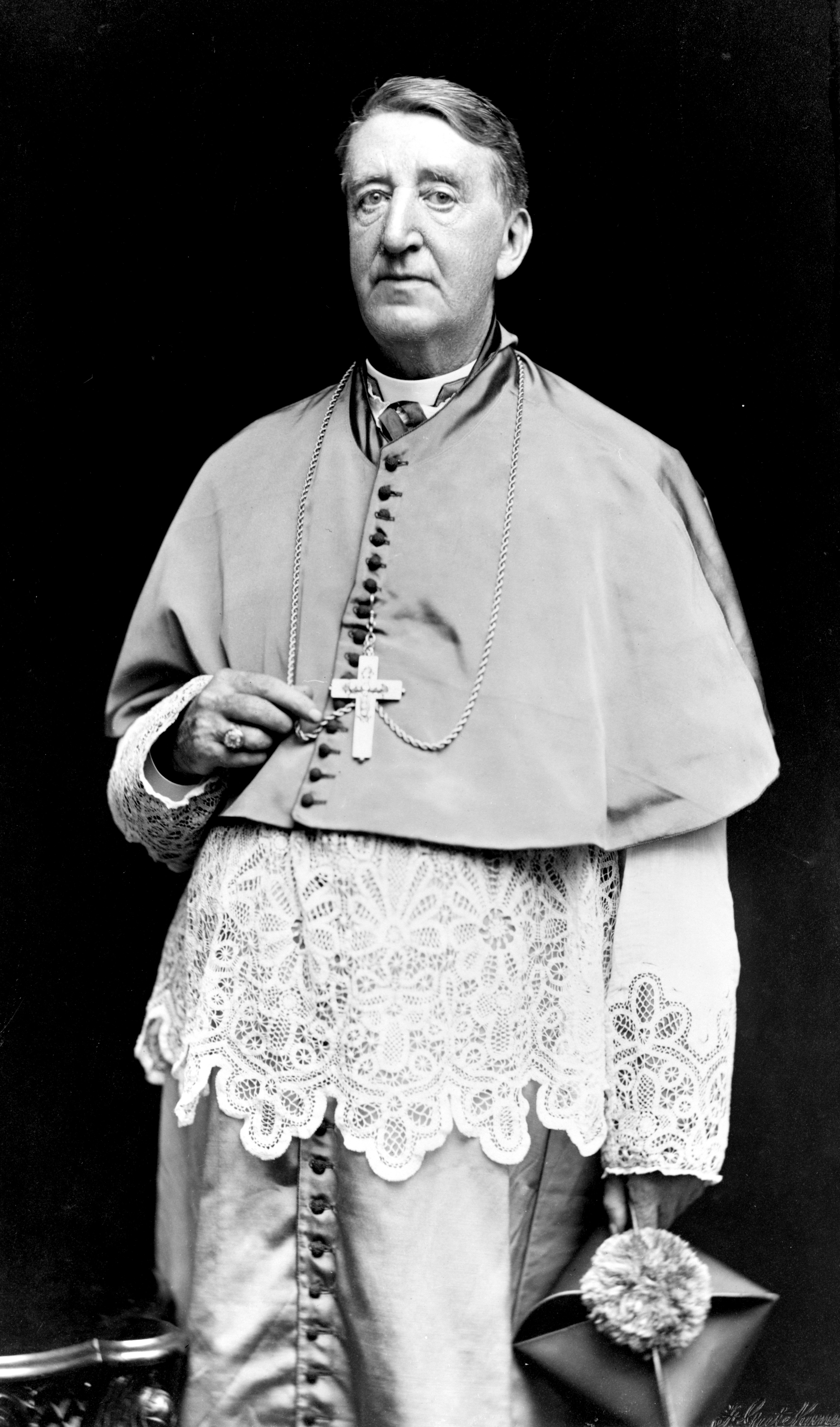
Edmond Francis Prendergast, former Archbishop of Philadelphia and namesake of the girls' school.

In 1917, the Archdiocese of Philadelphia purchased the 33 acres (130,000 m^{2}) for $57,000. Archbishop Edmond Francis Prendergast subsequently announced the construction of St. Vincent's Orphanage, which was to be operated by the Sisters of Charity of the Blessed Virgin Mary. Work on the project was slowed by the war, and Archbishop Prendergast died before the work was completed.

On May 9, 1920, the dedication of the new orphanage took place and was attended by Archbishop Dennis Dougherty and Pennsylvania governor William Cameron Sproul.

St. Vincent's functioned as an orphanage for over 30 years. By 1952, the number of children needing care had dwindled, and Archbishop John Francis O'Hara decided to move the remaining orphans to a smaller building in St. Davids and convert the facility into the new Archbishop Prendergast High School, an all-boys' school, which opened in 1953. The facility was turned into a high school to seek to meet the increasing demand for a Catholic high school in the expanding western suburbs of Philadelphia. In 1956, the archdiocese opened a new building on the same tract and named it Monsignor Bonner High School in honor of Monsignor John J. Bonner, a former superintendent of schools for the archdiocese. With the new construction, Monsignor Bonner then became an all-boys' school, and Archbishop Prendergast became an all-girls' school.

In 2005, the archdiocese's Office of Catholic Education announced that Monsignor Bonner High School and Archbishop Prendergast High School would unite in a co-institutional model with one administration. The new administration would include a single president, principal and assistant principals overseeing both schools. The new model became official for the 2006–07 school year.

In January 2012, as part of the wider 2012 Archdiocese of Philadelphia school closings, Archbishop Charles J. Chaput announced that both Monsignor Bonner and Archbishop Prendergast would close at the end of the school year at the recommendation of a blue ribbon commission. The basis of the commission's recommendation was founded upon the real estate value of the school land and their potential income after possible retail development. Soon after the announcement was made, the school administration began the appeal process which outlined plans for the improvement of both schools. In a 13-day span, alumni and supporters donated $1.11 million to keep the school open. Additionally, just days before the final decision regarding the schools was to be made, a group of business people came forward to help not just the two schools, but other high schools slated to close as well. On February 24, 2012, Archbishop Chaput announced that the schools would remain open, though they would now fully merge into one co-ed school known as Monsignor Bonner and Archbishop Prendergast High School. To accommodate the merger, the girls would move out of the Archbishop Prendergast building and into the Monsignor Bonner building beginning with the 2012–13 school year.

Since the merger, male athletic teams continue to use the "Friars" nickname from Bonner, while female athletic teams use the "Pandas" nickname from Prendergast. Homerooms remain single-sex, along with theology classes and health/physical education classes.

On March 28, 2018, an exchange student from Taiwan named Sun An-tso (Chinese: 孫安佐), the son of actors Peng Sun and Di Ying, was arrested for threatening to "shoot up" the school. On August 28, he pled guilty and sentenced to time served and deportation.

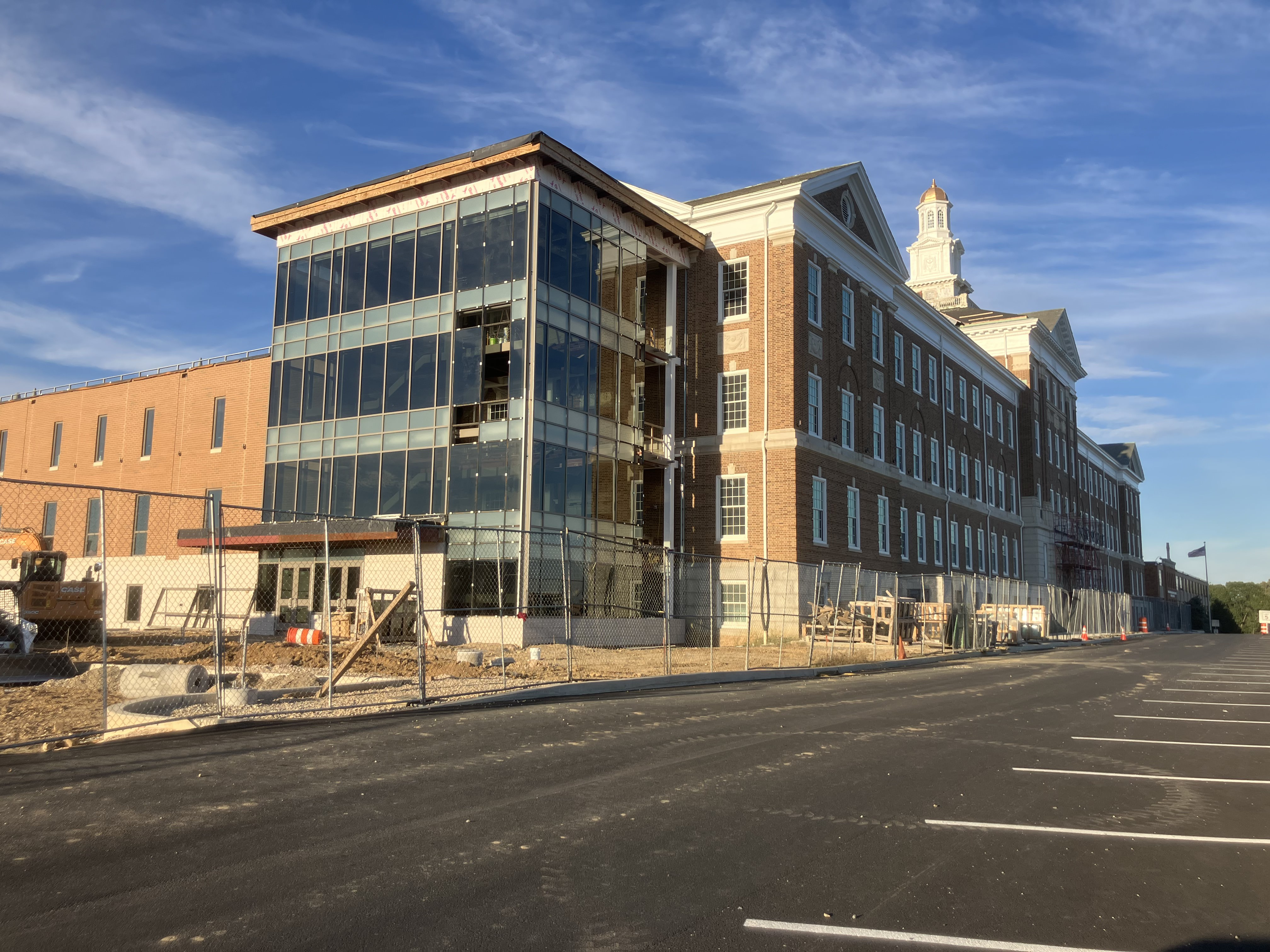
The former Archbishop Prendergast building being redeveloped into a campus for Delaware County Community College in 2025

In 2019, the school sold the former Archbishop Prendergast High School building to Delaware County Community College, where it has been redeveloped into a campus for the college. Costs for the redevelopment were estimated to be around $66.5 million

== Notable alumni ==
=== Monsignor Bonner ===
- Al Atkinson – former NFL & AFL linebacker for the New York Jets (1965–1974). 1967 AFL All-Star and Super Bowl III champion.
- William Edward Atkinson – Catholic priest
- Anthony Becht – former NFL tight end with the New York Jets, Tampa Bay Buccaneers, St. Louis Rams, Arizona Cardinals, and Kansas City Chiefs (2000–2011)
- Rodney Blake – former professional basketball player. Inducted into the Philadelphia Big 5 Hall of Fame.
- Leo Burt – indicted in connection with the August 24, 1970, Sterling Hall bombing at the University of Wisconsin–Madison campus; member of FBI Ten Most Wanted Fugitives list from September 4, 1970, to April 7, 1976
- John Cappelletti – 1973 Heisman Trophy winner and College Football Hall of Fame inductee
- Dennis Christopher – Golden Globe nominated film and stage actor
- Jerry Crawford – former umpire in Major League Baseball (1977–2010) and president of the Major League Umpires Association
- Christopher G. Donovan – former Democratic politician who served as the Speaker of the Connecticut House of Representatives (2009–2013)
- Ashley Howard – La Salle University men's basketball head coach (2018–2022)
- John Jonik – cartoonist
- Jamie Kennedy – stand-up comedian, television producer, screenwriter, and actor
- David Krmpotich – Olympic silver medalist in rowing an men's coxless fours; U.S. team torch bearer at 1988 Seoul Olympics
- Jason Love – professional basketball player for Unión de Santa Fe of the TNA
- Marcus McElhenney – won bronze medal for rowing in the men's eight at the 2008 Summer Olympics
- Larry Mendte – news anchor, commentator, and radio talk show host; first male host of Access Hollywood
- Carlos Mugabo – former basketball player for Florida Atlantic University (2005–2009) and the Rwanda national basketball team
- John Nash – former NBA general manager of the Philadelphia 76ers (1986–1990), Washington Bullets (1990–1996), New Jersey Nets (1999–2000), and Portland Trail Blazers (2003–2006)
- Sam Oropeza – professional mixed martial artist and boxer. Has competed for Bellator MMA, Strikeforce, and King of the Cage
- Harry Perretta – Villanova University women's basketball head coach (1978–2020).; 1996 Big East Conference women's basketball Coach of the Year
- Tommy Pope – actor and comedian
- Carl Robie – gold medal swimmer in 200 m butterfly "the Philadelphia flyer" (1959–1961)
- Thomas J. Stapleton – Pennsylvania State Representative for the 165th district (1975–1978)
- Ed Stefanski – former basketball player and NBA general manager of the New Jersey Nets (2004–2007) and Philadelphia 76ers (2007–2010)
- Mike Teti – head coach of United States National Men's Rowing Team (2018–present); won bronze medal for rowing in the men's eight at the 1988 Summer Olympics
- Marc Verica – former football quarterback for the Washington Redskins (2011) and Cougars de Saint-Ouen-l'Aumône, France (2012–2013)
- Quang Vinh – Vietnamese singer

=== Archbishop Prendergast ===
- Monica Horan (class of 1980), actress who starred in Everybody Loves Raymond.
- Stephenie LaGrossa Kendrick (class of 1998), Survivor contestant.
- Cheri Oteri (class of 1980), comedian and former Saturday Night Live cast member.
- Rahel Solomon (class of 2006), journalist
- Elaine Van Blunk (class of 1982), long-distance runner who came third at the 1994 Chicago Marathon.

=== Bonner–Prendergast ===
- Ayden Garnes (class of 2021), NFL cornerback for the Tampa Bay Buccaneers
- Nate Furman (class of 2020), baseball player for the Washington Nationals
- Kevin McGonigle (class of 2023), baseball player for the Detroit Tigers
- Isaiah Wong (class of 2019), basketball player for the Indiana Pacers and Charlotte Hornets, played college basketball for the Miami Hurricanes
