= St. Adalbert Church (Philadelphia) =

St. Adalbert
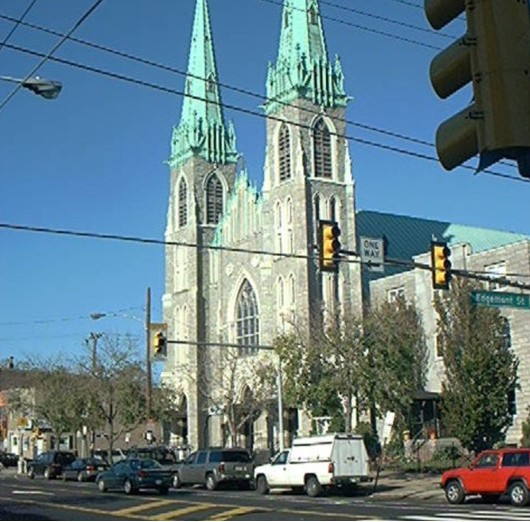
- St. Adalbert Church on Allegheny Avenue.
- St. Adalbert
- 39.984607°N 75.102506°W
- Location: Philadelphia, Pennsylvania
- Country: United States
- Denomination: Roman Catholic
- Website: Official website

History
- Founded: November 1903

Architecture
- Style: Polish Cathedral
- Completed: 1909

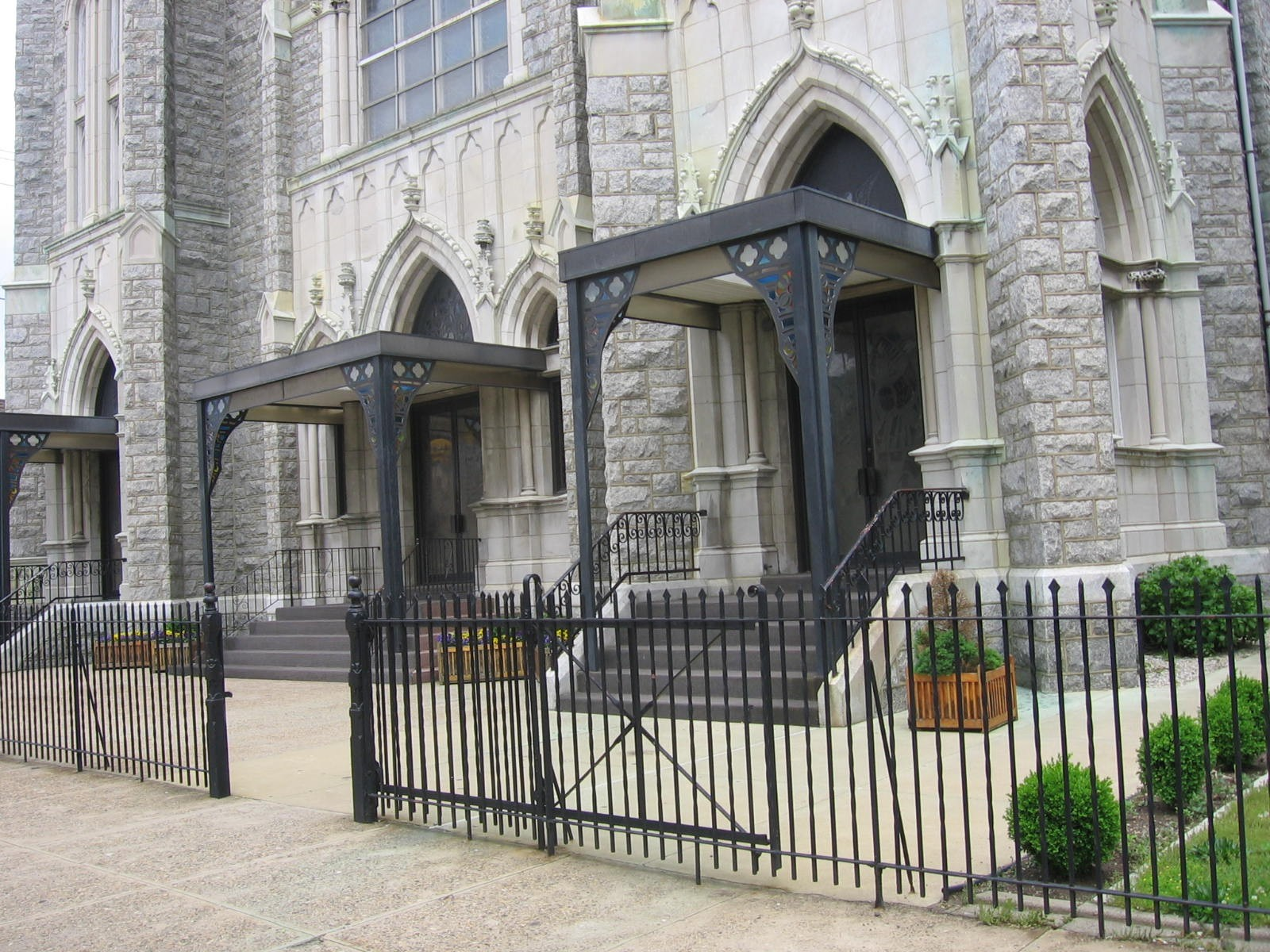
Detail of the front of St. Adalbert Church

The Church of St. Adalbert in Philadelphia, Pennsylvania, is a Roman Catholic church, constructed in the Polish Cathedral style. It is located in the Port Richmond neighborhood at 2645 E. Allegheny Avenue (at the corner of Allegheny Avenue and Thompson Street).

== History ==
The church was founded in November 1903, with construction completed in 1909, and was intended to serve the large Polish American immigrant community residing in the Port Richmond neighborhood of Philadelphia. Immigrant families, including that of Andrew Bogielczyk, who owned a grocery store at 2421 Allegheny Avenue which was a meeting place for the Polish community, became founding members for the then large sum of $25.00 needed to start construction. Fr. Monkiewicz was appointed the first pastor of St. Adalbert Church, and served until his death on June 3, 1946.

Prior to 1909 the Polish community of Port Richmond area used the basement of Our Lady Help of Christians German church on nearby Gaul Street, which served the local German-American immigrant community. The Poles had an altar set up in the basement of the church and used it for Mass and other religious activities.

Once construction of Saint Adalbert Church was completed, Mass was said in Latin with the sermon and non-Mass activities conducted in the Polish language.

In 1976, when he was still Cardinal Karol Wojtyla, Pope John Paul II stayed at St. Adalbert for two weeks during the 41st International Eucharistic Congress and he conducted a Poor Man’s Supper there.

On July 1, 2019, St. Adelbert, along with Mother of Divine Grace Parish, Nativity B.V.M. Parish, and Saint George Parish merged into a single congregation. St. Adelbert was chosen as the parish church of the merged Nativity BVM, which was renamed St. John Paul II Parish.

== Education ==
Our Lady of Port Richmond Regional School is the current designated parochial school for the St. John Paul II Congregation, and the St. Adelbert church facility. It was established in September 2008 by the merger of Nativity B.V.M, Our Lady Help of Christians, and St. Adalbert schools. Each of the predecessor schools had enrollments of about 200. The 2008 economic downturn prompted the schools to merge. There were 545 students in the merged school in 2008, but the continued economic malaise resulted in declining enrollments. By 2016 enrollment was at about 400 and recovering.

St. Adalbert School was a Roman Catholic private parochial school and was constructed next to the church. Monthly tuition fees were initially fifty cents for the first child, twenty five cents for the second, and the rest of the children in the family were exempt from fees. At the same time, parents paid a yearly fee for belonging to the parish of St. Adalbert. Books and school supplies had to be purchased by the students, but could be passed down to younger students. Eight grades were taught. Most of the classes were conducted in the Polish language, in particular religious classes, such as bible and catechism. All of the teaching was provided for by the Catholic nuns of the order of Sisters of the Holy Family of Nazareth who wore long black robes with a stiff pleated white bib-like collar. They also wore a black starched cap with black veil flowing down the back, with only their face showing. They also wore a big metal crucifix, which hung from the neck and a big black rosary which swung from the waist at the side of their outfit. Class size averaged about fifty boys and girls.

== Current status ==
St. Adalbert continues to serve the varied Port Richmond community, celebrating Mass in both English and Polish. The parish school is now called the Our Lady of Port Richmond Regional School.

== See also ==
- Port Richmond, Philadelphia, Pennsylvania
- Polish Americans
