= St. Hubert Catholic High School for Girls =

Saint Hubert Catholic High School for Girls

Location
- 7320 Torresdale Avenue; Philadelphia, Philadelphia, Pennsylvania 19136; United States; 40°1′51″N 75°2′5″W

Information
- Type: Private, All-Female
- Motto: Christus vincit (Christ conquers)
- Religious affiliation: Roman Catholic
- Established: 1941
- President: Lizanne Pando, M.Ed.
- Principal: Dr. Gina MacKenzie
- Grades: 9-12
- Gender: Female
- Student to teacher ratio: 20:1
- Colors: Brown and Gold
- Slogan: Becoming Women of Faith and Integrity
- Team name: Bambies
- Accreditation: Middle States Association of Colleges and Schools
- Publication: Echoings (literary/art annual)
- Newspaper: Tally-Ho
- Yearbook: Calling Echo
- Tuition: $9675 for all students. (as of 2022-2023 school year)
- Athletic Director: Ed Evanitsky
- Director of Institutional Advancement: Colleen Kean
- Director of Admissions: Jennifer Danford
- Website: https://www.huberts.org/

St. Hubert Catholic High School for Girls is a private Catholic preparatory school for girls located in the Tacony neighborhood Philadelphia, Pennsylvania. With over 425 students, it is the largest all-girls school in Philadelphia.

The school is named after St. Hubert, the patron saint of hunters, and is under direction of the Archdiocese of Philadelphia.

== History ==
The grounds of the school was originally home to a Catholic parish which was built in 1924 for German-speaking immigrants. On September 8, 1941, the school was officially opened. At its opening, the student body numbered 631, with 20 sisters serving in the faculty. Since 1941, over 21,000 students have graduated from St. Hubert. St. Hubert is the largest all-girls school in the archdiocese in Philadelphia. The mascot is a deer named Bambie.

From circa 1997 to 2012 the enrollment declined by 55%, the sharpest decrease of any senior high school in the Philadelphia archdiocese, and in 2012 the campus was 40% occupied. The Archdiocese of Philadelphia used the lower enrollment and a budget shortfall of $624,480 from 2006 to 2012 as reasons to have the campus closed. The archdiocese announced on January 6, 2012, that the school would close in June 2012 due to declining enrollment as part of the 2012 Archdiocese of Philadelphia school closings; a final decision on February 24, 2012, reversed that decision. People wishing to save the school held a fundraiser to generate funds needed to keep it open.

== Athletics ==
The high school is home to the largest female athletic program in Philadelphia, with four intramural sports teams and 14 varsity teams. The four intramural sports include flag football, volleyball, badminton, and indoor soccer. Girls can make teams with their friends and play these sports for fun without competing against other schools. The 14 varsity sports at St. Hubert Catholic High School for Girls include cross country, field hockey, soccer, tennis, volleyball, golf, basketball, bowling, cheerleading, indoor track and field, swimming, outdoor track and field, softball, and lacrosse. St. Hubert also has experienced many athletic accomplishments and has won some championships over the years, including tennis, bowling, and soccer. St. Hubert was the first high school to have a women's golf team. To help sponsor the athletics and make sure they run smoothly, there is an Athletic Association that oversees the athletic related events.

The 2022-23 Saint Hubert Varsity and JV Gold Cheerleading won first place at the NCA competition.

== Extra-curricular activities ==
St. Hubert offers its students over 40 clubs in which to participate. Among the most popular are:

Academic and school-focused clubs

- National Honor Society
- Mathletes
- Student council
- Bambie Ambassadors (school representatives)
- Calling Echo (yearbook)
- Tally-Ho (student newspaper)

Arts and culture clubs

- Art club
- Black Student Union
- Drama club
- Dance club
- Chorus
- Hand bell choir
- Orchestra
- String ensemble
- Concert band
- Chamber ensemble
- Bambies United
- Philosophy club

Cause-related clubs

- Community Service Corps
- Respect for Life club
- SADD (Students Against Destructive Decisions)
- Anti-Defamation League's No Place for Hate

Non-competitive clubs

- Intramural volleyball
- Flag football
- Basketball
- Badminton
