= 2012 Archdiocese of Philadelphia school closings =

The 2012 Archdiocese of Philadelphia school closings was the solution to the reducing enrollment problem of the Archdiocese of Philadelphia, caused mainly by demographic shifts and an increasing number of students enrolling in unaffiliated schools. Because of this, tuition rates had to be raised, causing fewer families to be able to afford the cost. Being in the decision process for years, the list was finalized by the Blue Ribbon Commission on January 6, 2012 at around 11:00 AM. The schools were informed soon afterward, and they were all officially announced during the press conference at 4:00 PM.

== History ==
In December 2010, the Blue Ribbon Commission was created by Cardinal Justin Rigali to address the enrollment and financial issues. The enrollment had a 35% drop since the year 2001, and it was decided to close some schools so that the property could be sold and the profit used to help the archdiocese. Archbishop Charles Chaput became head of the archdiocese in September 2011 and pledged full support to the Blue Ribbon Commission.

Rumors soon started spreading about what would become of different schools. Archbishop John Carroll High School, which turned out not being on the recommendation list, had strong rumors of it closing so that Monsignor Bonner High School and Archbishop Prendergast High School could officially merge, making a fair count of one high school closing in Delaware County. Suspense built up during the week of the announcement date, making every Archdiocesan school nervous about what would happen.

On Friday, January 6 at 10:00 AM, all presidents, principals, and pastors of the Archdiocesan schools reported at Neumann University to hear of what would become of their respective schools. At 12:00 PM, assemblies were held to tell the students and faculty whether their school would close or stay open. All high schools were to be dismissed at 1:00 PM. A press conference was held at 4:00 PM that day by the Blue Ribbon Commission to officially announce which schools were closing.

All closing schools completed the 2011–2012 school year and officially closed in June.

== List of school closings ==
The following is a list of the schools that will be closing at the end of the 2011-2012 school year.

=== Elementary schools ===
There is a total of 44 out of the 156 elementary schools in the archdiocese that will close. Seven schools in Delaware County were leaked before the official announcement. The rest will be announced during the press conference at 4:00 PM.

==== Delaware County ====
- Annunciation BVM, Haverford
- Holy Savior-St. John Fisher, Lower Chichester
- Our Lady of Fatima, Secane
- St. Cyril of Alexandria, East Lansdowne
- St. Francis de Sales, Aston
- St. Gabriel, Norwood
- St. John Chrysostom

=== High schools ===
5 of the 17 high schools in the archdiocese will also be closing. They were all announced early in the day on January 6. No schools were closed in the counties of Montgomery or Chester.

- Archbishop Prendergast High School, Delaware
- Conwell–Egan Catholic High School, Bucks
- Monsignor Bonner High School, Delaware
- St. Hubert Catholic High School for Girls, Philadelphia
- West Catholic Preparatory High School, Philadelphia

== Reactions ==
The week after the students returned from Christmas break, from Tuesday, January 3 up to the announcements at 4:00 PM on Friday, was reportedly the most suspenseful. Many teachers, students, and parents criticized the long wait and were hoping that leaks would reveal the information early.

The closing of West Catholic High School came as such a shock that the term "West Catholic" was trending on Twitter after the announcement.

=== Conwell-Egan High School ===
Teachers who were told of the announcement before the students arrived at the assemblies around 12:00 PM were "red from crying." Interviewed students of closing schools were overwhelmingly upset about the results, while students from on-the-fence schools were relieved. After the closing schools let out at 1:00 PM, many of the students were shown on news stations hugging each other and crying.

=== Monsignor Bonner and Archbishop Prendergast High Schools ===
Students and staff of these schools reportedly shared similar reactions to those of Conwell-Egan. Several students reported on how sad the situation was, and photos were released of students hugging and crying on the campus.
