= Orinoka Mills Corporation =

Textile company

- Industry: Textiles
- Predecessor: B. L. Solomon's Sons
- Founder: The Solomon Brothers
- Fate: Acquired by Lantal Textiles, Inc
- Headquarters: Kensington section of Philadelphia, Pennsylvania, United States

Orinoka Mills Corporation, formerly B. L. Solomon's Sons was a major quality textile company located at 2753 Ruth Street in the Kensington section of Philadelphia, originally with offices at 1200 Chestnut Street in downtown Philadelphia, Pennsylvania. It was built in the 1880s by the Solomon Brothers.

== History ==
Orinoka Mills maintained offices at 149 Clarendon Building, New York City, and at 350 New Orleans Street, Chicago, Illinois. Orinoka Mills was purchased by Lantal Textiles, Inc. in the mid-1980s. Through the purchase Lantal acquired the extensive and valuable library of Orinoka's fabric documents. The site is currently being converted into apartments by the New Kensington Community Development Corp.

Orinoka Mills Corporation works are held in the collection of the Cooper-Hewitt, National Design Museum.

== Product ==
Orinoka initially produced silk and curtain materials, but, in 1898 the firm placed its emphasis on furniture coverings (upholstery). The firm had approximately 300 looms running, when it was decided, in the 1930s, to move its upholstery operations to York, Pennsylvania, and locations in the southern United States. However it retained its offices in Kensington for administrative purposes and for special processes.

The quality of textiles produced by firm are such that surviving Orinoka Mills items are still traded in the marketplace, such as on eBay and other websites.

== Orinoka literature ==
A number of sales and style bulletins published in New York City by Orinoka still appear on the market, such as:

- Orinoka Sales and Style Bulletin. No. 10. Georgian Directoire
- Orinoka Sales and Style Bulletin. The Use of Color as a Sales Argument
- Orinoka Sales and Style Bulletin. Colors for Large Rooms; Colors for Small Rooms
- Orinoka Sales and Style Bulletin. No. 6. The Choice of Pattern

== See also ==
- Upholstery
- Plush
