= Frederick Halterman =

American politician (1831–1907)

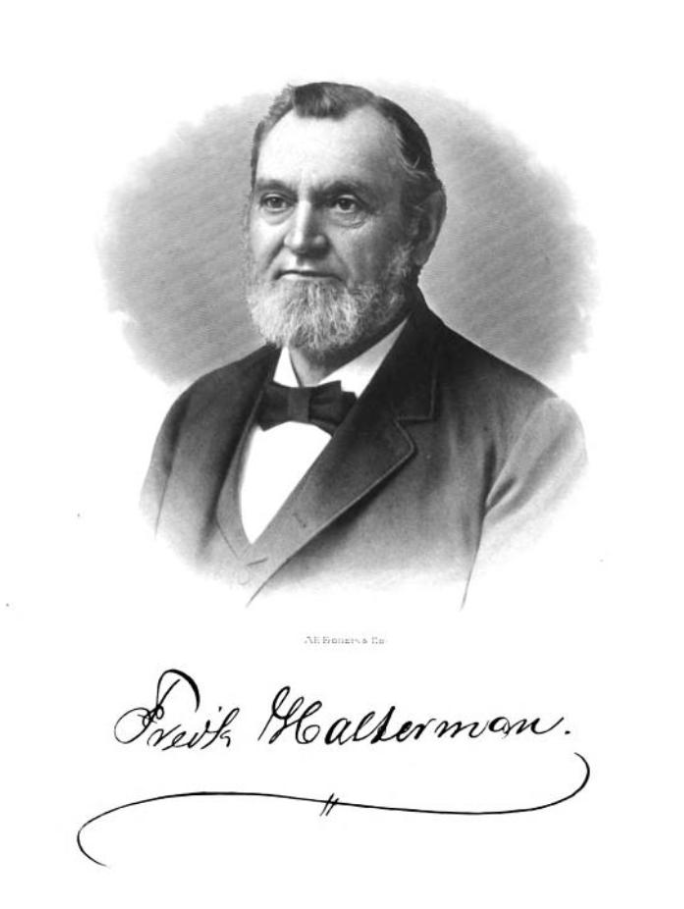

Member of the U.S. House of Representatives from Pennsylvania's 3rd district
- In office March 4, 1895 – March 3, 1897
- Preceded by: William McAleer
- Succeeded by: William McAleer

Personal details
- Born: October 22, 1831 Bremen, German Confederation
- Died: March 22, 1907 (aged 75) Philadelphia, Pennsylvania, U.S.
- Resting place: Laurel Hill Cemetery, Philadelphia, Pennsylvania, U.S.
- Party: Republican

Frederick Halterman (October 22, 1831 – March 22, 1907) was a German-American politician who served as a Republican member of the U.S. House of Representatives for Pennsylvania's 3rd congressional district from 1895 to 1897.

== Biography ==
Halterman was born on October 22, 1831, to John and Meta Halterman in Vegesack on the Weser, part of the old Hanse town of Bremen in the German Confederation. He immigrated to the United States and settled in Philadelphia in September 1849. He worked in a grocery store for four years then opened his own store. He operated a successful merchant business in the Northern Liberties neighborhood for thirty-eight years and retired in 1891. He served as a School Director from 1872 to 1881. He was elected a member of the select council in 1880 for a term of three years.

He was nominated as the Republican nominee for Congress and was supported by the reformer Rudolph Blankenburg. He was elected in 1894 as a Republican to the 54th Congress (March 4, 1895 – March 3, 1897). While his support came mainly from German immigrants, he appealed to other voters through his support of a protective tariffs against imported goods. His victory was part of a Republican resurgence in Philadelphia and throughout Pennsylvania. He was an unsuccessful candidate for reelection in 1896. He was elected president of the twelfth sectional school board of Philadelphia, PA in 1898 and served until his death in Philadelphia. He was interred at Laurel Hill Cemetery in Philadelphia.

== Sources ==
U.S. House of Representatives
Preceded by William McAleer	Member of the U.S. House of Representatives from Pennsylvania's 3rd congressional district 1895-1897	Succeeded by William McAleer
