= Henry Burk =

American politician

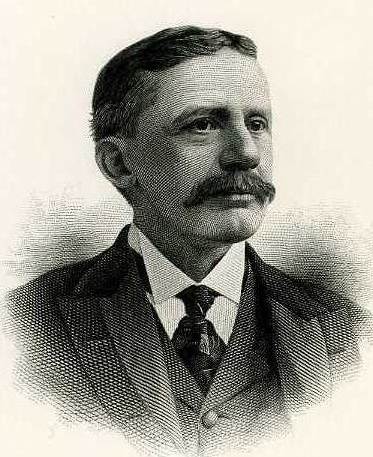

Member of the U.S. House of Representatives from Pennsylvania's 3rd district
- In office March 4, 1901 – December 5, 1903
- Preceded by: William McAleer
- Succeeded by: George A. Castor

Personal details
- Born: September 26, 1850 Kingdom of Württemberg
- Died: December 5, 1903 (aged 53)
- Resting place: Holy Sepulchre Cemetery, Cheltenham Township, Pennsylvania, U.S.
- Party: Republican
- Spouse: Ellen Carney

Henry Burk (September 26, 1850 – December 5, 1903) was a Republican member of the U.S. House of Representatives from Pennsylvania and Philadelphia businessman.

== Private life ==
Henry Burk was born in Knittlingen, Kingdom of Württemberg, son of David Burk and his first wife Louisa Klotzenbacher Burk; Henry was their fourth child. David, a shoemaker, made the decision to leave Germany because of unacceptable political views and with his second wife, Charlotte Reinmann Burk, they received permission from Wurttemberg authorities to leave. The family emigrated to the United States in 1854 and settled in Philadelphia, Pennsylvania. Henry attended school only a few years, but then began to work to help his family; he was reputed to have a natural engineering ability. He became a repairer of shoemaking machinery and subsequently engaged in supplying this machinery to the trade. He was engaged in the manufacture of leather and in 1887 invented the alum and sumac tawing process, which revolutionized the tanning industry. The company he founded with his two brothers Alfred E. Burk and Charles D. Burk, Burk Brothers and Company, is now listed as a Registered Historic Place. He also helped to establish a meat packing company in Philadelphia with the same brothers and two others, William and Louis; this company was known variously as Burk Meats and Louis Burk & Co. ("Burk's Franks" were known throughout the Delaware Valley well into the 1950s). He became president of the Manufacturers’ National Association in 1895. He travelled around the world for his leather business, from Europe—visiting his birthplace in 1894—to India.

=== Family ===
Burk married Ellen Carney (1851–1914) on August 18, 1873, in Philadelphia; they had six children: Mary, Charles Henry, Henry Jr., Helen, Gertrude, and Charlotte. Burk was grandfather to character actor Henry Jones (1912–1999), and great-grandfather to actress Jocelyn Jones.

== Congress ==
Burk was originally elected in 1901 as a Republican to the 57th Congress and until his death in Philadelphia.

During the time that Burk served in Congress, the Boer War was raging in South Africa. Burk supported the Boers against the British. However, the United States sold the British preserved meat and hay, as well as mules and other supplies. Burk moved in the House that "mules, remounts, and other supplies be declared contraband", but by this time the war was practically over.

He died on December 5, 1903, and was interred at Holy Sepulchre Cemetery in Cheltenham Township, Pennsylvania.

== See also ==
- List of members of the United States Congress who died in office (1900–1949)

U.S. House of Representatives
Preceded by William McAleer	Member of the U.S. House of Representatives from Pennsylvania's 3rd congressional district 1901-1903	Succeeded by George A. Castor
