= Whistle Belly Vengeance =

17th- and 18th-century British drink

Whistle Belly Vengeance is a drink that was made in 17th- and 18th-century Britain and in British North America. It was made from sour beer mixed with molasses and bread crumbs or crusts, though one recipe printed in 1982 also states dried pumpkin could be used. In some parts of North America it was drunk as a breakfast.

== Description ==
The drink is known to have been made in the 17th- and 18th-century British Isles and in British North America as a means of making sour beer more drinkable. It was generally made by mixing quantities of sour beer with molasses and breadcrumbs. Richard Erdoes says they came from "rye-injun" bread. The mixture was boiled together in a large kettle and served hot. A 1960 book by the Christian Schmidt Brewing Company states that crusts of brown bread could be used in place of breadcrumbs. A 1982 work by the American Flint Glass Workers' Union describes a recipe of 1 US gallon (3.8 L) of weak and sour beer, 1 US quart (0.95 L) of molasses and 1 US dry quart (1.1 L) of dry bread crumbs or dried pumpkin.

A drink by the same name (or sometimes known as "Whip Belly Vengeance") served in the Caribbean is different. Made from a mixture of rum, gin and molasses, it was formerly drunk by the lower classes in that region.

== Use ==
In the 17th and 18th centuries, some guests arriving late at roadside inns found it was the only drink available. In some parts of North America, it was drunk as a form of breakfast. The American revolutionary era patriot James Otis Jr. was fond of the drink. He continued to frequent the Royal Coffee House in Boston long after it had been taken over by British soldiers, because of his fondness for their Whistle Belly Vengeance, which was mixed with rum.

== See also ==
- Sour beer – beer which has an intentionally acidic, tart, or sour taste
