= Cohoquinoque Creek =

River

Coordinates: 39.96259°N 75.16313°W

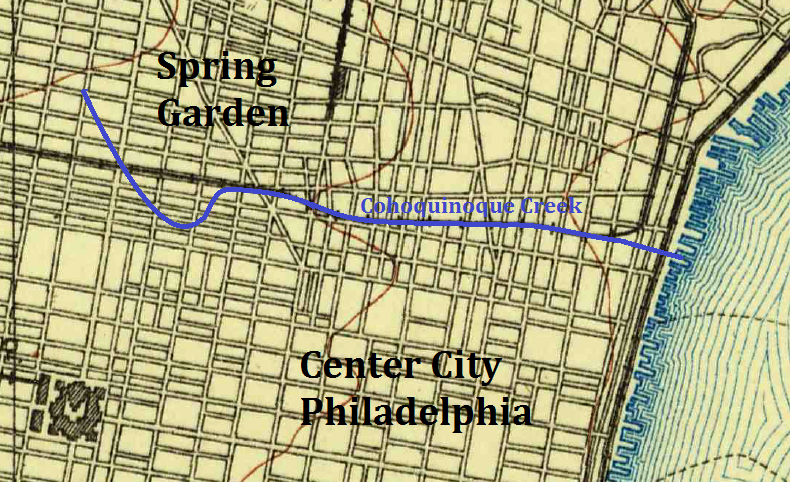
Former course of the Cohoquinoque Creek in Philadelphia

The Cohoquinoque Creek was formerly a stream running west to east through the Callowhill neighborhood in Philadelphia, along the southern part of Northern Liberties and immediately north of original northern boundary of Philadelphia. This small tributary of the Delaware River remains today, as a sewer, under Willow Street, which winds its way through what is sometimes called the East Callowhill Industrial District. Its name, spelled various ways (Cohoquenoque, Cohoquonoque, Cohoquinoke), is said to be derived from a Lenni-Lenape word for "the grove of long pine trees." This was also the name of a nearby Lenape village.

Accounts vary, but Cohoquinoque Creek arose around the present-day intersection of Fifteenth and Spring Garden Streets (and perhaps as far north as Fairmount Avenue) and was also fed by a well-known spring in the Spring Garden district near present-day Ninth Street. The creek was later primarily known as Pegg's Run. Willow Street, a rare curvilinear street in the older part of Philadelphia, is wavy because it follows the course of the old stream. For centuries, Cohoquinoque Creek has often been confused with Cohocksink Creek, which is about a mile to the north.

== Early history ==
At one time, Cohoquinoque Creek was navigable by small boats from the Delaware, and farm products were floated on flat boats for sale in Philadelphia. Rowers could even make their way up as far as the famous Spring Garden spring. In the 1780s, a bridge (Poole's or Pool's bridge) was built over the stream at Front Street and citizens were proud of this early structure. The land on both sides was low and swampy, and several people straying from the causeway lost their lives in the mud. There were sluices under the causeway to permit free flowing of water.

The name Pegg’s Run was derived from Daniel Pegg, a Quaker brickmaker who once possessed nearly all of the Northern Liberties south of Cohocksink Creek. Pegg in 1686 acquired three hundred and fifty acres of marshy ground in that area from one Jurian Hartsfelder, who held a patent on the land dating back years before the arrival of William Penn. (The land along the Delaware River that became Philadelphia was under Swedish control from 1638 to 1655, when it passed to Dutch control, and then English control in 1664.)

== Industrial use and conversion to sewer ==
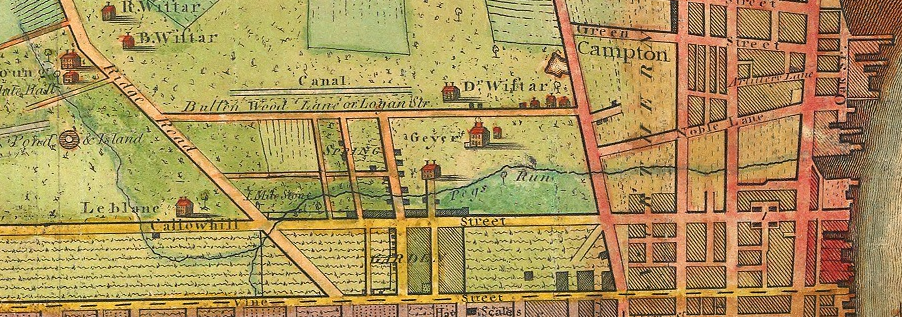
Detail of Cohoquinoque Creek (Pegg's Run) on an 1802 street map of Philadelphia.

Accounts vary as to when Pegg's Run was covered over and made into a city sewer. One states that the stream was covered as far west as Franklin Street (now removed) by 1811 and to Ninth Street by 1824. Whatever the case, the stream had become tremendously polluted even as early as the late 18th century, with numerous tanneries and other early Philadelphia industries located along its banks. The following accounts indicate how bad the situation was:

A small stream of water, called Pegg's Run, passes through a portion of the Northern Liberties and Spring Garden, which, until a few years ago, was left open and unimproved. The bottom of the stream was miry, and, at low tide and in hot and droughty weather, was often destitute of sufficient water to carry off its contents. Receiving the offals of very many slaughter-houses, lanyards, glue, starch, dressed skin, and soap manufactories adjoining it, as well as the contents of two culverts, of a large number of privies, and of the gutters of the numerous populous streets and alleys it crosses, it became highly offensive, and the source of noxious exhalations. This stream, which plays a conspicuous part in the history of one of the epidemics, and was correctly pronounced the greatest nuisance in Philadelphia, attracted finally the attention of the public and council, and has since been culverted.

--From René La Roche, Yellow Fever, Considered in Its Historical, Pathological, Etiological, and Therapeutical Relations... (Blanchard and Lea, 1855), at 27-28.

...[I]n reference to the development in Duke Street, (then Artillery Lane,) Northern Liberties, he alludes to its proximity to what was called in a petition of that time, "the greatest nuisance in Philadelphia," Pegg's Run, and describes it "as an open culvert or common sewer, passing through the closely built parts of Penn Township, Spring Garden, and the Northern Liberties, to the River Delaware. In its course, it receives the contents of the gutters of the numerous populous streets and alleys it crosses, and two culverts from the city also open into it. Along its borders are situated a number of manufactories of glue, starch, dressed skins, and soap. About fifty slaughter-houses, and the privies of most of the adjoining dwellings, the refuse, fermentable and putrescent matters of which are all emptied into its stream. Except during the heavy rains, or immediately after them, the stream is barely sufficient to carry along, with a sluggish current, the mass of decomposing, offensive substances that compose it, for in fact, it seems more like liquid mud than water."

--From Report of the Philadelphia Relief Committee Appointed to Collect Funds for the Sufferers by Yellow Fever, At Norfolk & Portsmouth, Va., 1855 (Inquirer Printing Office, 1856), at 27-28. (Most of the language within this quote was taken from an article entitled "An Account of the Yellow or Malignant Fever Which Appeared in the City of Philadelphia in the Summer and Autumn of 1820 with Observations on That Disease," by Dr. Samuel Jackson, beginning on page 313 of volume 1 of The Philadelphia Journal of the Medical and Physical Sciences (1820), at page 355.)

After the sewer was built, the tanners and other industries along the way obtained entrances into it, and thus continued discharging their wastes into the covered stream and out into the nearby Delaware River.

Willow Street was built on top of the culvert by 1829. Around 1834, tracks were laid on the thoroughfare by the Northern Liberties and Penn Township Railroad. These tracks ran from the Delaware River to Broad Street and connected to the Philadelphia and Columbia Railroad tracks on Pennsylvania Avenue. In the 1850s, the entire line became part of the Reading Railroad.

== Modern times ==
When the East Callowhill Street district was cleared for urban redevelopment in the late 1960s (i.e., the Callowhill East Urban Renewal Area project), the tracks were removed but the sewer remained. This is why Willow Street itself was not removed when the other streets in the district were. The sewer flows into the Delaware River at what was once known as the Willow Street wharf. Today, that vicinity is midpoint between Callowhill and Spring Garden Streets.

== See also ==
- List of rivers of Pennsylvania
