= Bodine High School for International Affairs =

- Thomas Jefferson School
- U.S. National Register of Historic Places
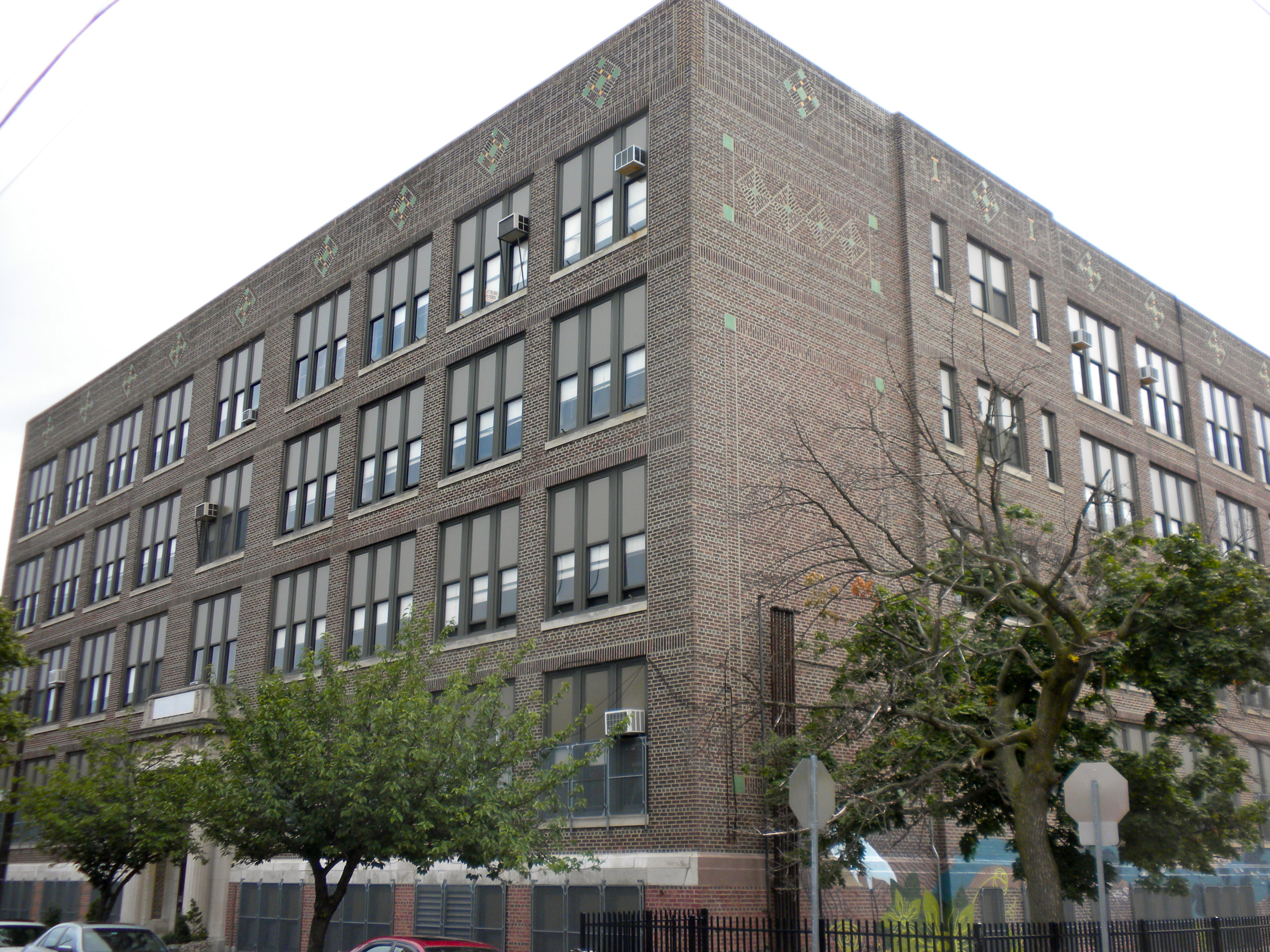
- Thomas Jefferson School, August 2010

- Location within Philadelphia Location within Pennsylvania Location within the United States
- Location: 1101-1125 N. 4th St., Philadelphia, Pennsylvania
- Coordinates: 39°58′5″N 75°8′37″W
- Area: 2 acres (0.81 ha)
- Built: 1924
- Architect: Irwin T. Catharine
- Architectural style: Art Deco, Utilitarian
- MPS: Philadelphia Public Schools TR
- NRHP reference No.: 88002280
- Added to NRHP: November 18, 1988

William W. Bodine High School for International Affairs is a historic high school in the Northern Liberties neighborhood of Philadelphia, Pennsylvania. It is part of the School District of Philadelphia.

== History ==
The World Affairs Council and the school district cooperated in establishing the high school in 1981.

The school's building was designed by Irwin T. Catharine and built in 1924. It is a four-story, nine bay brick building on a raised basement in the Art Deco-style. It features an entrance portico with Doric order columns supporting an entablature.

It was added to the National Register of Historic Places in 1988 as the Thomas Jefferson School. The building and the school it previously housed were originally named for President Thomas Jefferson.
