= Reading Brewing Company =

Former American beer brewing establishment

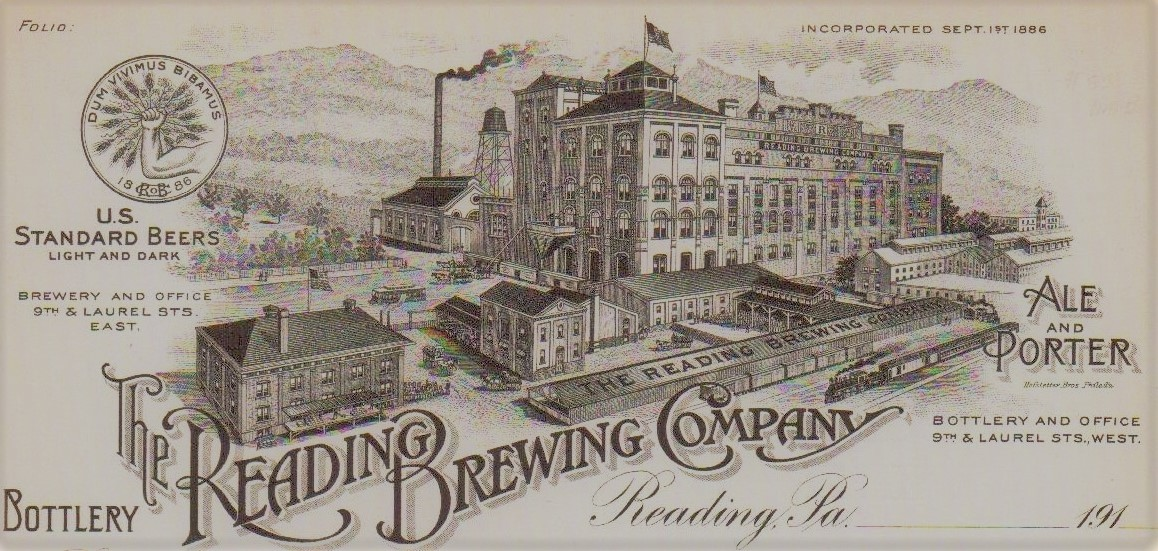
- Industry: Brewery
- Founded: 1886
- Founder: Philip Bissinger
- Defunct: 1976
- Headquarters: Reading, Pennsylvania, United States
- Products: Beer

The Reading Brewing Company was an American brewery established by Philip Bissinger in 1886. Headquartered in Reading, Pennsylvania, it ceased operations in 1976.

The brand and label were purchased shortly afterwards by C. Schmidt & Sons. Brewing under license has started and stopped under several different production agreements since.

== History ==
=== Reading Brewing Company ===
On August 9, 1886, "stockholders of the Reading Brewing Company met ... at Bissinger's Cafe, for the purpose of effecting a permanent organization." Henry S. Eckert, Garrett B. Stevens, and Lewis Kemp were then elected as president, secretary, and treasurer, respectively, while Philip Bissinger and George Pohlig were appointed as general manager and superintendent. The board's Committee on Subscription reported that "over three-fourths of the capital stock" of the company was already "subscribed," and the paperwork for the company's application for a charter was completed in anticipation of its submission to state government officials the next day. The president and general manager were then authorized to "proceed at once in making preparations for the erection of [the company's new brewery] buildings." Construction began the next morning at 9th and Laurel streets in Reading at 7 a.m.

During its early years of operation, the Reading Brewing Company owned Mt. Penn Park, and produced a Pennsylvania Dutch Lager at a volume of 1,200 barrels per year. Before the turn of the century, the brewery was able to increase production so significantly that it was able to turn out approximately 50,000 barrels of beer per year, beginning in 1891.

In 1901, local newspapers reported that "James Haring, driver of team No. 1, of the Reading Brewing Company, was the first brewery driver to deliver with a sleigh" on the snowy morning of January 31.

In late October 1902, The Reading Eagle reported that the company "just completed extensive improvements to its plant at 9th and Laurel, which will give it a largely increased output." Noting that "no money has been spared in the improvements" and that "the plant today is as well equipped as any in the country for its size," the newspaper added that the "company's business has steadily advanced, owing to the improved quality of its beer," and that the company "does a large local trade" with a product that "is popular with the public." Among the improvements made that year, the kettle and fermenting tank capacity were both enlarged, a "new automatic weighing and counting machine" was "put in for the measuring of malt," and an improved keg washing machine and a cyclone filter mass washer where were installed, as were a "Colby automatic racker," a "Theurer filter with 20 cells," and "a new electric beer pressure regulating pump," which were expected to double the racking room's capacity. In addition, "Pawling & Harnischfeger, of Milwaukee, put in a model pitching machine, which pitches beer kegs, and is a labor saving arrangement." And the company also built a new beer storage facility across the street, and was in mid-construction of a new office building that would include a counting room and a directors' room.

In 1918, the company's attorney, Joseph R. Dickinson, brought suit against the Muhlenberg Brewing Company for its failure to pay the Reading Brewing Company for its purchase of $1,396.53 of "beer, ale, porter and other brewery products."

Even bigger challenges began for the company in 1920 with the start of Prohibition in the United States. On October 27, 1923, The Reading Eagle's front page carried the headline, "Beer Dumped Into Sewers Blows Off Manholes, Floods Two Streets: Populace Rushes to Scene with Kettles, Bottles and Pans for Free Refreshments." Beginning at 8:45 a.m. that morning, U.S. Treasury Department agent D.D. Gough began carrying out orders to destroy twenty-six of the company's 250-gallon tanks of beer in order to facilitate the brewery's sale to George W. Green of the Reading Tobacco Company.

From 1934 to 1951, the company ran a "retro" advertising campaign that appealed to consumers' nostalgia for simpler times. Seven years later, Reading Brewing was forced to rebrand due to flagging sales. Adopting the slogan, "The Friendly Beer for Modern People," it then reversed its slump and continued to post strong sales figures into the early 1970s.

==== Closure ====
In 1976, the Reading Brewing Company ceased operations due to increasing pressure from larger macro brewers. The company's last day of operation was April 15, 1976.

=== Subsequent brand ownership/licensing ===
==== C. Schmidt & Sons ====
Following the closure of the Reading Brewing Company its brand and label were then purchased shortly afterwards by C. Schmidt & Sons.

The brand changed hands several times until 1999, when it was again retired.

==== Legacy Brewing ====
In 2006, the label was revived by Legacy Brewing, which went on to produce original recipes from the revitalized brewery until 2009 when the label and its recipes were sold to Ruckus Brewing.

==== Sly Fox Brewing Company ====
On July 10th, 2019, it was announced that Sly Fox Brewing Company out of Pottstown, Pennsylvania, recently signed a licensing agreement to start brewing Reading Premium Beer. Sly Fox will change the recipe, but only slightly, to “better suit our equipment but also make a better tasting liquid” according to Sly Fox managing partner John Giannopoulos. The new version of Reading Premium will be slightly cheaper than typical craft beer.

This rendition of Reading Premium was first released during a special party at the Barley Mow Craft Beer House in West Reading during the annual Art on the Avenue on June 15th, 2019.

Under Sly Fox, Reading Premium is packaged in draft, with plans to sell it in 16 ounce cans.
