= Daniel Boone School =

Historic place in Pennsylvania, USA

- U.S. National Register of Historic Places
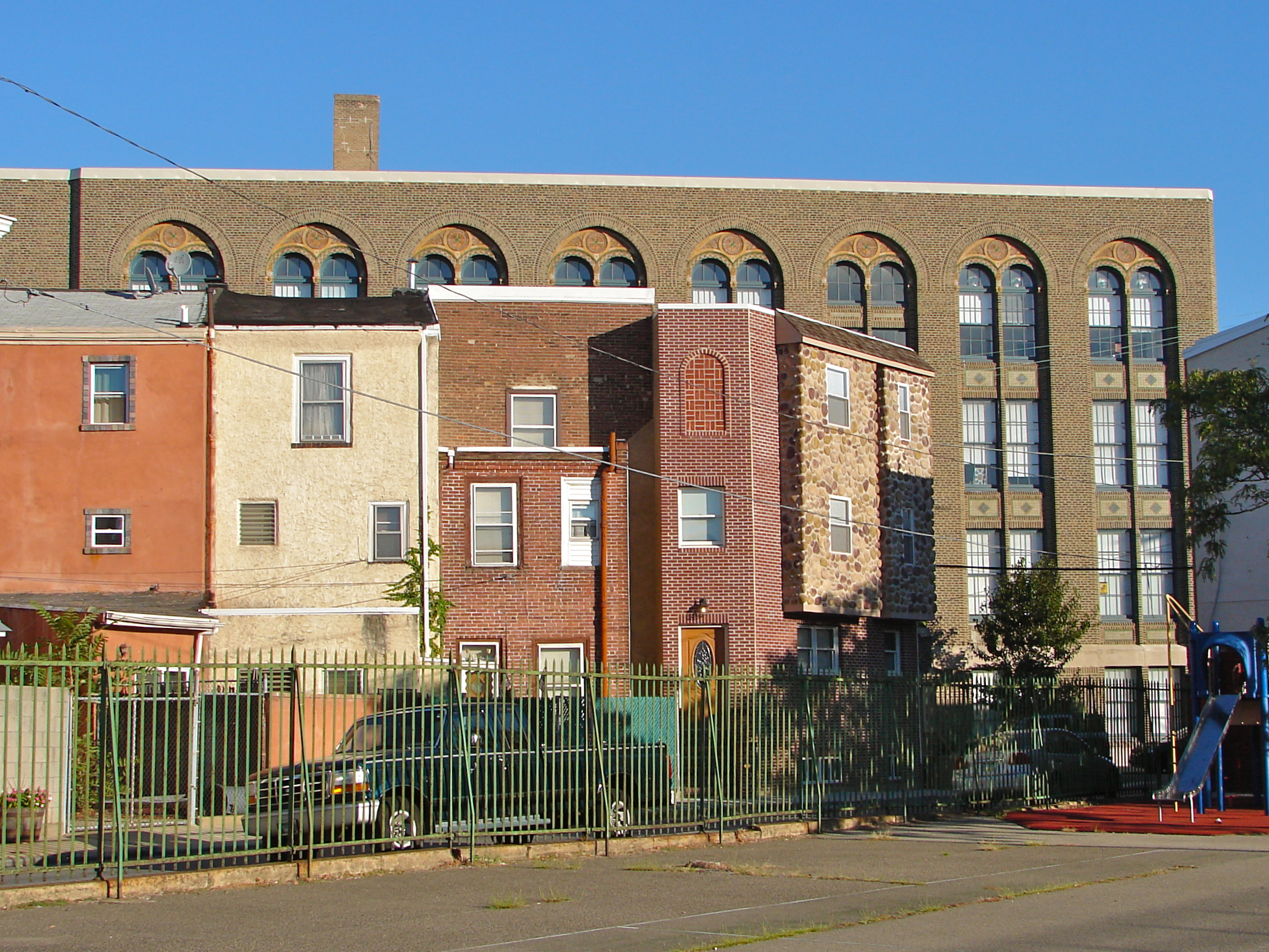
- Daniel Boone School, September 2010

- Location within Philadelphia Location within Pennsylvania Location within the United States
- Location: Hancock and Wildey Sts., Philadelphia, Pennsylvania
- Coordinates: 39°57′39″N 75°7′47″W
- Area: less than one acre
- Built: 1926-1927
- Architect: Catharine, Irwin T.
- Architectural style: Late Gothic Revival
- MPS: Philadelphia Public Schools TR
- NRHP reference No.: 86003265
- Added to NRHP: December 4, 1986

Daniel Boone School is a historic school building located in the Northern Liberties neighborhood of Philadelphia, Pennsylvania. It was designed by Irwin T. Catharine and built in 1926–1927. It is a four-story, eight bay brick building with a two-story center section in the Late Gothic Revival-style. It features an off-center entrance with arched limestone surround, decorative tile mosaic panels, and a decorative brick and tile cornice. It is named for frontiersman Daniel Boone (1734–1820).

It was added to the National Register of Historic Places in 1988.
