= William McAleer =

American politician

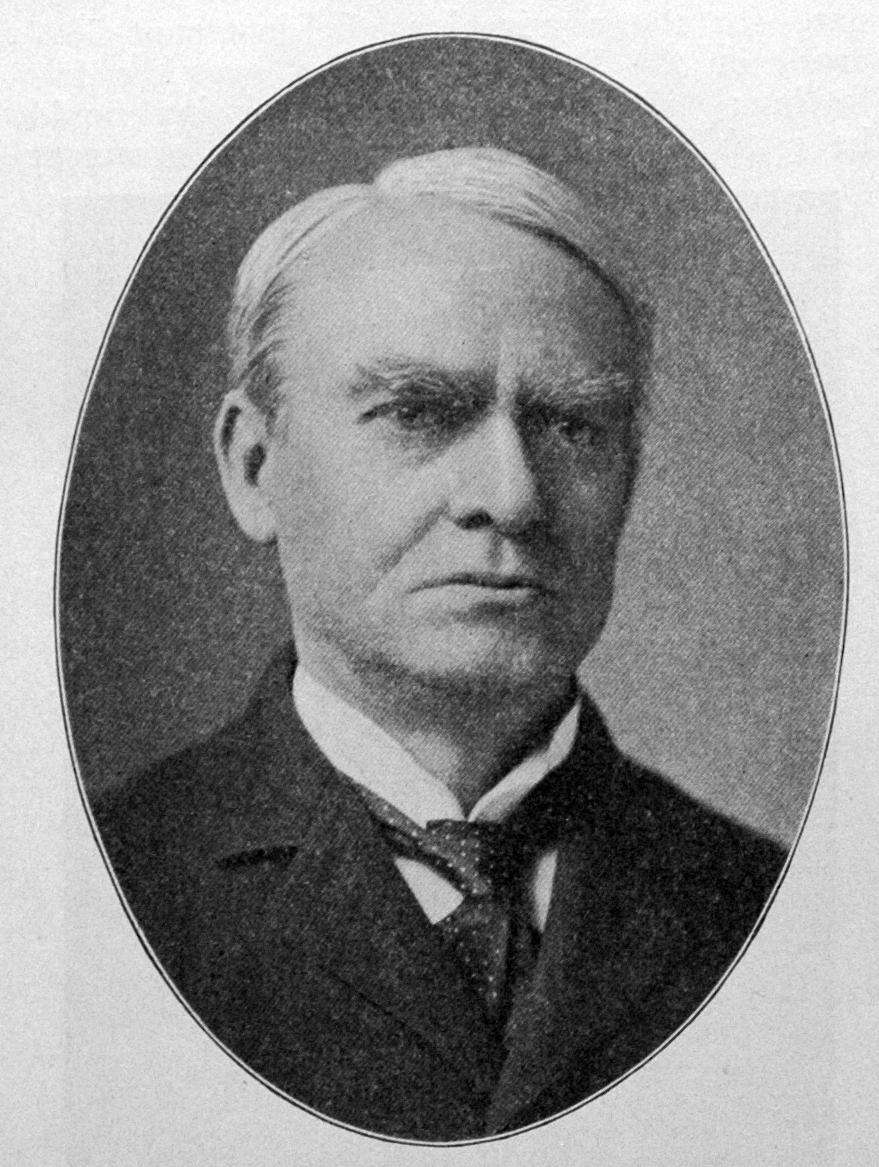

Member of the U.S. House of Representatives from Pennsylvania's 3rd district
- In office March 4, 1891 – March 3, 1895
- Preceded by: Richard Vaux
- Succeeded by: Frederick Halterman
- In office March 4, 1897 – March 3, 1901
- Preceded by: Frederick Halterman
- Succeeded by: Henry Burk

Member of the Pennsylvania Senate from the 2nd district
- In office 1886–1890
- Preceded by: Joseph P. Kennedy
- Succeeded by: Elwood Becker

Personal details
- Born: January 6, 1838 County Tyrone, Ireland, UK
- Died: April 19, 1912 (aged 74) Germantown, Philadelphia, U.S.
- Resting place: Holy Sepulchre Cemetery, Cheltenham Township, Pennsylvania, U.S.
- Party: Democratic

William McAleer (January 6, 1838 – April 19, 1912) was an American politician from Pennsylvania who served as a Democratic member of the U.S. House of Representatives for Pennsylvania's 3rd congressional district from 1891 to 1895 and from 1897 to 1901.

== Early life and education ==
McAleer was born in County Tyrone on the island of Ireland (the entirety of which was then part of the U.K.). He emigrated to the United States with his parents, who settled in Philadelphia, Pennsylvania, in 1851. He attended public and private schools.

== Career ==
In 1861 he became a partner with his father and brothers in the firm of John McAleer & Sons, flour merchants. He was elected in 1870 to the Common Council, the lower house of the city council at the time. He was not renominated to a second term, but was appointed to the Board of Guardians of the Poor in 1873, and served as its vice president and later president. He was also member of the commercial exchange and served successively as its director, vice president, and president. In 1880 he was director of the chamber of commerce. As president of the Friendly Sons of St. Patrick he organized for the relief of immigrants.

He was elected to the Pennsylvania State Senate in 1886 to represent the 2nd Senate district. In 1890, he was nominated by the Democratic Party to run for Congress against Richard Vaux, who had just been elected in May 1890 to serve out the term of Samuel J. Randall. Vaux was nominated by the Independent Democrats and had his name on the Republican line; but McAleer won the election by about 3,000 votes. He won re-election in 1892 as an Independent Democrat with the endorsement of the Republicans. In 1894, after two terms, he was defeated for the Democratic nomination by Joseph P. McCullen, a lawyer who was defeated in the general election by Frederick Halterman.

He won back his seat in 1896 by defeating Halterman by 2,099 votes. In the 1900 elections, he was defeated by Henry Burk, an election in which Republicans increased their majority from 18 to 47 members. After his defeat, he was appointed as a committeeman to the Pennsylvania Democratic State Committee under a banner of reform.

As a member of Congress, he served on the Committee of Naval Affairs and brought federal funds for improvements at the Philadelphia Naval Shipyard and secured construction for cruisers and battleships at the yard. he also won appropriations of $750,000 for the construction of the new Philadelphia Mint building.

He resumed business activities in Philadelphia and died in Germantown, Philadelphia, Pennsylvania, aged 74. He is interred at the Holy Sepulchre Cemetery in Cheltenham, Pennsylvania.

U.S. House of Representatives
Preceded by Richard Vaux	Member of the U.S. House of Representatives from Pennsylvania's 3rd congressional district 1891-1895	Succeeded by Frederick Halterman
Preceded by Frederick Halterman	Member of the U.S. House of Representatives from Pennsylvania's 3rd congressional district 1897-1901	Succeeded by Henry Burk
Pennsylvania State Senate
Preceded by Joseph P. Kennedy	Member of the Pennsylvania Senate, 2nd district 1886-1890	Succeeded by Elwood Becker
