= Integrity Title Insurance, Trust and Safe Deposit Company =

- U.S. National Register of Historic Places
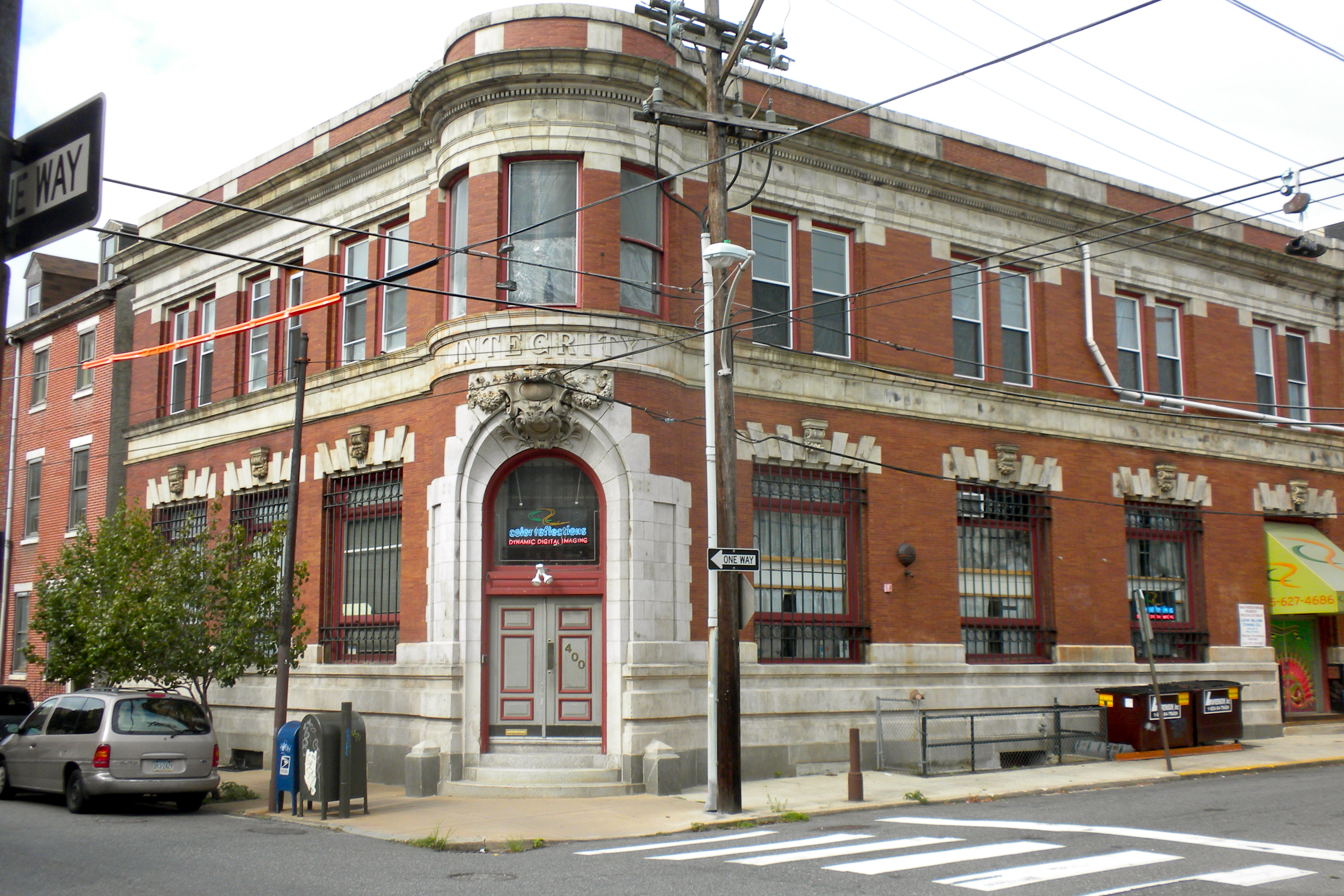
- Integrity Title Insurance, Trust and Safe Deposit Company, August 2010

- Location within Philadelphia Location within Pennsylvania Location within the United States
- Location: 4th and Green Sts., Philadelphia, Pennsylvania
- Coordinates: 39°57′52″N 75°8′55″W
- Area: less than one acre
- Built: 1902, 1912
- Architect: Davis, Paul & Seymour; Multiple
- Architectural style: Colonial
- NRHP reference No.: 82001548
- Added to NRHP: November 14, 1982

The Integrity Title Insurance, Trust and Safe Deposit Company is an historic bank building that is located in the Northern Liberties neighborhood of Philadelphia, Pennsylvania, United States.

It was added to the National Register of Historic Places in 1982.

== History and architectural features ==
This historic structure was built in 1902; an addition was built in 1912. The two-story building was designed in a German baroque style and has a limestone base with Pompeiian brick and flat stone arches.
