= Christian Schmidt Brewing Company =

American brewery (1860–1987)

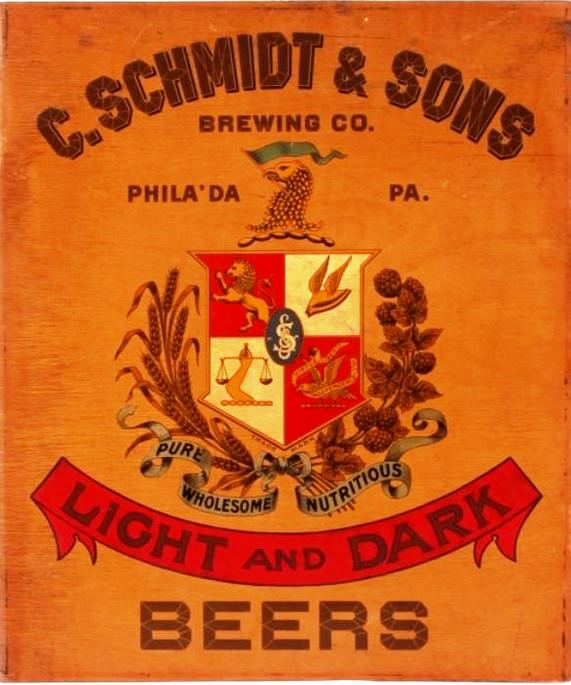
- Pre-prohibition sign
- Type: Private
- Industry: Alcoholic beverage
- Founded: 1860
- Founder: Christian Schmidt
- Defunct: 1987
- Headquarters: Philadelphia, Pennsylvania, U.S.
- Products: Beer

The Christian Schmidt Brewing Company was an American brewing company headquartered in Philadelphia, Pennsylvania. Founded in 1860, it was the largest brewing company in the history of Philadelphia, producing nearly 4,000,000 barrels of beer a year in the late 1970s. When it closed in 1987, it marked the first time in over 300 years that there was no brewery operating in Philadelphia.

== History ==
=== Early history ===
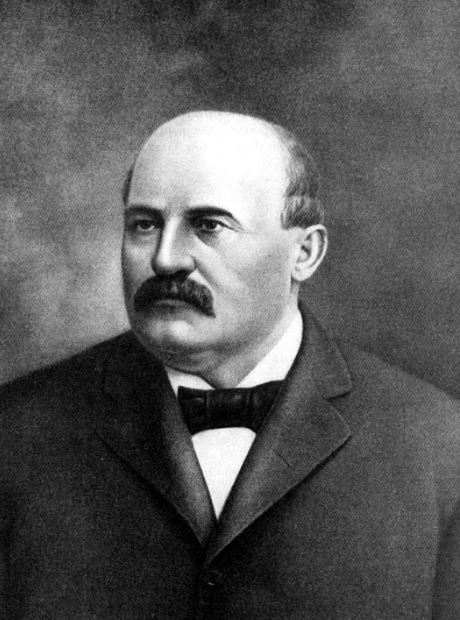
Christian Schmidt (1833–1894)

Christian Schmidt was born in Magstadt, Württemberg, Germany in 1833. He spent three years in Stuttgart, where he learned brewing, before emigrating to Philadelphia, Pennsylvania, at the age of 18. After his arrival in Philadelphia, he worked for six months on the Camden & Atlantic Railroad that was being built to Atlantic City, and then secured employment in the brewing business. By the late 1850s he had become associated with the brewery of Robert Courtney, which was located on Edward Street near the intersection of Second Street and Girard Avenue in the Northern Liberties neighborhood of Philadelphia. In 1860 Schmidt became a partner in the brewery, which was renamed Christian Schmidt, Kensington Brewery when Schmidt became sole proprietor in 1863. Production in 1860 has variously been stated to be either 500 or 3,000 barrels of ale and porter a year. By 1873, production had grown to 20,000 barrels a year and in 1880 Schmidt built a new brewery and ice house in order to be able to produce lager beer. In 1887 a new brew house, which doubled capacity, was built. In 1890, the brewery produced 65,000 barrels.

In 1892, Christian Schmidt's three sons, Henry C., Edward A. and Frederick W., became partners in the firm and the name of the brewery was changed to C. Schmidt & Sons. By 1894, Schmidt's was the sixth-largest brewer in Philadelphia. Its principal beers at that time were a pilsner and a dark beer called Puritan.

After Christian Schmidt's death in 1894, Edward A. Schmidt became head of the company. He was a practical brewer and tireless innovator who would lead the company for the next 50 years. By 1896, Schmidt's had an annual capacity of 100,000 barrels.

In late 1896, Schmidt's purchased the Robert Smith India Pale Ale brewery, which traced its origins to 1774 and was then America's oldest brewing concern. In 1888, the Robert Smith brewery had moved to a new plant, located at Thirty-Eighth Street and Girard Avenue in West Philadelphia, that was capable of producing 50,000 barrels annually. The Robert Smith brewery produced ales under the Tiger Head brand. After its 1896 acquisition, the Schmidt brothers operated the brewery through a corporation, the Robert Smith Ale Brewing Co., until Prohibition.

In 1902, the firm was incorporated as C. Schmidt & Sons Brewing Co.

In 1908, Schmidt's Robert Smith Ale Brewing Co. subsidiary purchased the Peter Schemm & Son Brewery, located at 25th and Poplar Streets.

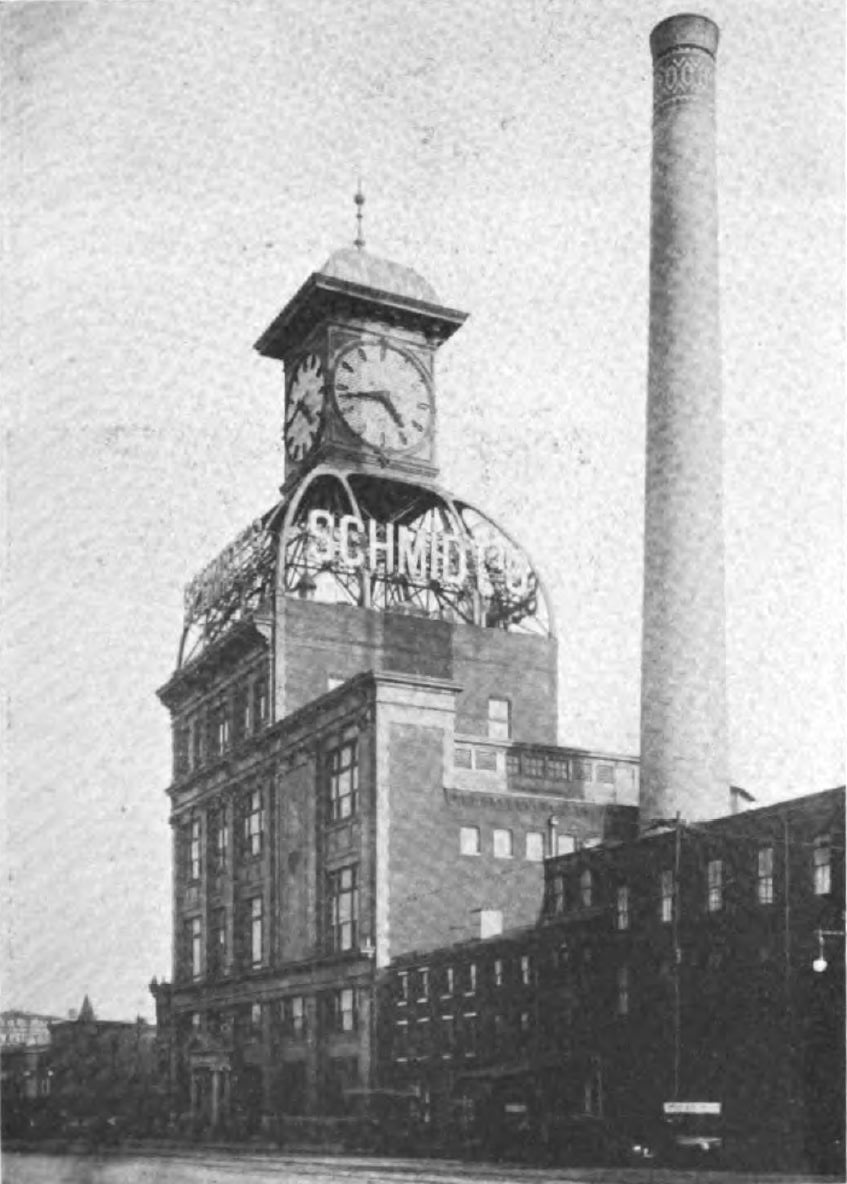
C. Schmidt & Sons Brew House, Philadelphia, 1914, Girard Avenue east of Second Street

A new state-of-the-art brew house and power plant was opened in 1914 at the Schmidt plant. Located on Girard Avenue just east of Second Street, the brew house was constructed with multi-level tiers and included two copper brew kettles, each with a capacity of 750 barrels. The brew house was designed by architect Otto C. Wolf and was topped with a 235-foot high clock tower that included a "Schmidt's" sign that was illuminated at night. After the expansion, the plant was capable of producing 200,000 barrels a year. The combined capacity of the Schmidt's, Robert Smith and Peter Schemm breweries then stood at 300,000 barrels a year.

The Peter Schemm brewery closed in 1918 due to declining profitability brought about by World War I taxes and other wartime restrictions, including a lack of grain.

=== Prohibition era (1920–1933) ===
Like all American breweries, C. Schmidt & Sons was forced to stop selling alcoholic beer in 1920 after Prohibition came into effect. During Prohibition, Schmidt's produced non-alcoholic cereal beverages. Non-alcoholic brands that it produced included Puritan Special and Green Label. Production of non-alcoholic cereal beverages required brewers to first make high-powered beer and then remove the alcohol it contained prior to sale. Except for one raid in 1925 in which 400 barrels and 7,000 cases of high-powered beer that were ready for shipment were found, the company avoided Prohibition violations.

In 1923, the Robert Smith Ale Company brewery property was sold.

=== Post-prohibition era ===
Following the repeal of the Volstead Act in March 1933, Schmidt's began selling 3.2% beer on April 7, 1933. In December 1933, after the 18th Amendment was repealed, it began selling a full-strength "Repeal Beer".

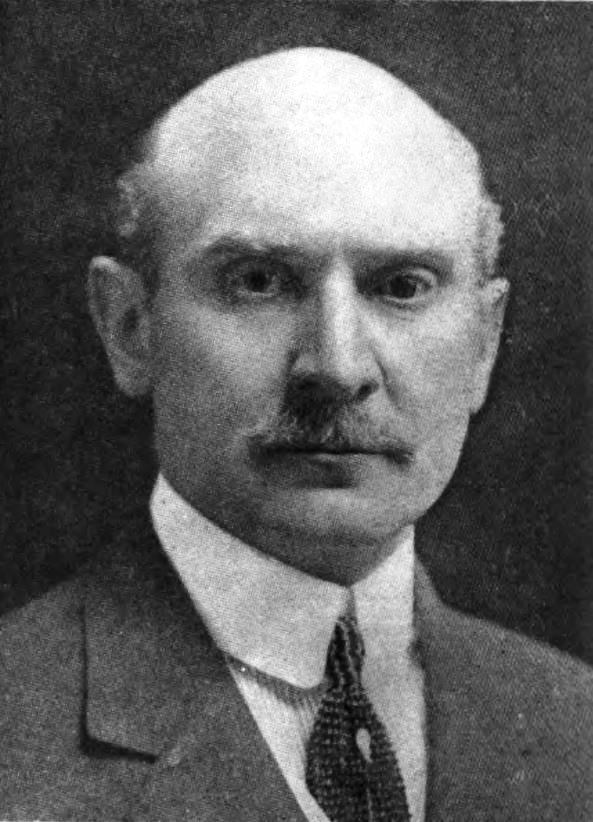
Edward A. Schmidt (1863–1944) led C. Schmidt & Sons from 1894 to 1944.

After repeal, Edward A. Schmidt implemented a program to expand and modernize the Schmidt's plant. Extensive modernization and expansion was carried out, and new large capacity buildings and equipment were added. A new ale fermenting and storage cellar was built that was separate from the facilities used for lager beer production. It was equipped with open fermenters and storage tanks made of California redwood. A new office building, malt storage building, gas collecting cellar, and bottling cellar were also built. A canning line was installed that filled Crowntainer cans of beer. Schmidt's became known for its technical innovations and used more of its own original custom-made equipment than any other brewery in the country (most of it designed by Chief Engineer Richard Slama). Schmidt's introduced the quart bottle, 16-ounce bottle, and was among the first breweries to sell cans of beer in six-pack cartons.

In 1934, sales stood at about 106,000 barrels. By the end of 1934, Schmidt's Beer (Light and Dark versions), Tiger Head Ale, Tiger Head Porter and a seasonal bock were being produced.

About a year after repeal, sales began to mushroom and soon reached 500,000 barrels. This made Schmidt's the largest brewer in Pennsylvania, and in the 1930s the company achieved regional distribution.

After 50 years of leadership, Edward A. Schmidt died in 1944. Frederick W. Schmidt, the last surviving son of Christian Schmidt, then served as president for one year before becoming chairman of the board, a position he held until his death in 1949.

Christian H. Zoller, a grandson of Christian Schmidt, served as president from 1945 until his death in May 1958. Under his leadership, the company experienced the greatest sales growth in its history. Schmidt's became the leading brand in the Philadelphia market in 1946, and sales reached 1,000,000 barrels a year for the first time in 1948. Further modernization and building programs were carried out between 1947 and 1950. An addition to the brew house was built that added a third brew kettle with a capacity of 750 barrels. In 1954, Schmidt's acquired the Adam Scheidt brewery in Norristown, Pennsylvania. The Norristown brewery was capable of producing 500,000 barrels annually. By 1955, Schmidt's sales reached 1,916,708 barrels. Schmidt's relied heavily on a tavern trade, and in 1960 one-third of its sales were still for draft beer, which was nearly double the national brewery average.

In 1958, Carl E. von Czoernig, the 40-year-old great-grandson of Christian Schmidt, became president of the company. Under his leadership, modern marketing techniques were introduced. The company redesigned product packaging to present a modern image, and made improvements in distribution. By 1962, Schmidt's held a 33% market share in the Philadelphia area. In the mid-1960s, Schmidt's became the first brewer to use computers for production, planning and inventory control. In 1964, Schmidt's purchased the old Standard Brewing Co. brewery on the West Side of Cleveland, Ohio from F. & M. Schaefer Brewing Co. The brewery had an annual capacity of 450,000 barrels, and the purchase enabled further expansion into Ohio, western Pennsylvania and New York state. In 1964 Schmidt's produced 2,000,000 barrels for the first time.

In 1971, Schmidt's bought a larger brewery on Cleveland's East Side – one capable of producing 1,500,000, barrels annually – from Carling Brewing Co. The West Side Cleveland brewery was then closed.

In 1972, Schmidt's bought the brands of the Duquesne Brewing Co. of Pittsburgh, whose flagship brand was Duke Beer. Duquesne produced 642,734 barrels in 1971, and had been Pittsburgh's second-largest brewer. Schmidt's moved production of the Duquesne brands to its Cleveland brewery and the Pittsburgh plant (which Schmidt's did not purchase) closed. The closure of the Duquesne brewery caused a lot of bitterness in the Pittsburgh area and a boycott of Schmidt's-produced Duke Beer ensued. Sales of the Duquesne brands plummeted in Pittsburgh, although they did not slip as much in eastern Ohio.

Schmidt's began having financial troubles in the early 1970s, as competition from both national and other regional breweries intensified. Purchasing the brands (but not the plants) of failing breweries became a common method employed by regional brewers like Schmidt's to boost sales. Schmidt's 1972 purchase of the Duquesne brands proved to be the first of five such acquisitions Schmidt's would make over a 10-year period.

Schmidt's held a 25% share of Delaware Valley beer sales in 1972, while Schaefer held 15% and Ortlieb's and Budweiser each had 8%.

1974 brought price shocks in the commodities used to brew beer, which further compounded Schmidt's difficulties. In October 1974, Schmidt's announced that its Norristown brewery was being closed because it was inefficient. Schmidt's produced 3,470,000 barrels in 1974, about 200,000 barrels less than the prior year, and it lost money for the first time in its history.

Schmidt's share of the Philadelphia-area beer market, which had stood at 33% in 1962, fell to 28% in 1967, 25% in 1972 and 20% in 1975.

Carl E. von Czoernig served as president of the company until he was removed on April 16, 1975. Drew Lewis, an outside manager hired by First Pennsylvania Bank, trustee for the stockholders of the family-owned company, was brought in to run the company. Schmidt's then reported that talks were underway to sell the brewery and on May 30, 1975, G. Heileman Brewing Co. of La Crosse, Wisconsin announced that it had agreed to buy Schmidt's for $16 million in cash and notes. In August 1975, however, the sale fell through, reportedly because Schmidt's failed to fulfill nine conditions for the sale.

On March 30, 1975, The Philadelphia Inquirer had published an article about a blind taste test involving 10 beers, including Coors and Schmidt's. At the time, Coors was not officially distributed east of the Mississippi, and it enjoyed considerable mystique in the East. Schmidt's was judged the best beer in the taste test, while Coors finished fifth. The article generated favorable publicity for Schmidt's, which capitalized on it with an advertising campaign. As a result, Schmidt's experienced a sales bump. It has been said that the improved business outlook made Schmidt family members less interested in selling the brewery and that this was why the sale to Heileman fell through. Regardless of the reason, Schmidt's, which incurred a loss of $4 million in 1974, earned a profit of $2 million in 1975.

In April 1976, Schmidt's acquired the brands of the Reading Brewing Co. of Reading, Pennsylvania, which was closing. Reading brewed the Reading Premium and Bergheim brands, and had produced about 200,000 barrels in 1975.

=== William H. Pflaumer era ===
Schmidt family ownership of the company ended in April 1976 when it was sold to William H. Pflaumer. Pflaumer, then 42 years old, owned both a Schmidt's distributorship and a large beer trucking company. Pflaumer paid $15.9 million for Schmidt's, using only $150,000 of his own money and borrowing the rest.

Billy Pflaumer, as he was known, had started in the beer trucking business in 1959 with one truck and $7,000, and he grew his business into a company with 118 tractors and 275 trailers. He also acquired a Schmidt's beer distributorship, which he grew to be the company's largest, sometimes by using tactics that antagonized other Schmidt's distributors. Along the way, he had brushes with the law, including a conviction in 1972 for mislabeling kegs of Ballantine beer as Schaefer, Piel's or Schlitz beer. There were also allegations of connections with organized crime figures. Pflaumer, who wore sunglasses due to a congenital eye condition, was a workaholic who rarely drank. Although he had no formal education beyond high school, he was quick with numbers and savvy about business. Pflaumer was once described as a mix between Jimmy Cagney and Albert Einstein.

In October 1977, Schmidt's purchased the brands of Rheingold Breweries Inc., which had been one of the largest brewers in the New York area. Prior to the sale, Rheingold had projected 1977 sales of 1.2 million barrels, and it was expected that the addition of Rheingold's labels would increase Schmidt's output by about a million barrels a year. Schmidt's paid $5 million for Rheingold's brands and $2 million for its Orange, New Jersey brewery, which it closed and sold. Production was shifted to Philadelphia, and 625 Rheingold employees lost their jobs. Schmidt's also quickly sold two of the labels it had acquired: McSorley's Ale was sold to Henry F. Ortlieb Brewing Co. of Philadelphia, and Esslinger (the brand of a Philadelphia brewery that had closed in 1963) was sold to the Lion of Wilkes-Barre, Pennsylvania.

In early 1978, the brands of the Erie Brewing Company were acquired. Erie Brewing had been producing about 300,000 barrels annually in the mid-1970s.

Schmidt's also expanded its own product line during this period. In 1977, it introduced Schmidt's Bavarian and Schmidt's Oktoberfest and it produced Schmidt's Bock for the first time since 1969. In 1978, Schmidt's Light was introduced.

In 1978, Schmidt's attempted a hostile takeover of the F. & M. Schaefer Brewing Company. Schaefer, a regional brewer that was based in New York, had expanded into the Philadelphia area in the mid-1960s and by 1978 was the top-selling beer in the Philadelphia market. In the early 1970s, Schaefer spent $70 million in three stages to build a five million barrel brewery in Fogelsville, Pennsylvania, that was considered to be the most efficient brewery in the eastern United States. Nevertheless, Schaefer, like Schmidt's, was experiencing serious financial difficulties. Schaefer successfully fended off Schmidt's attempted takeover in court by contending that the acquisition would violate antitrust laws. At the time, Schmidt's and Schaefer were head-to-head competitors among popularly priced beers in the Philadelphia and New York metropolitan markets, and Schaefer held a 21% market share in the Philadelphia area (with Schmidt's share at 12.6%), while Schmidt's (which now owned the Rheingold brands) held 24% of the New York food store market, compared to Schaefer's 23%. In fighting the takeover attempt, Schaefer impugned Pflaumer's integrity by arguing that his prior legal problems would jeopardize Schaefer's licensing in New York and New Jersey. Before the case was over, the judge ordered that Schmidt's pay Schaefer's legal fees, which amounted to nearly half-a-million dollars.

Under Billy Pflaumer's tenure, Schmidt's production peaked at 3,850,000 barrels in 1979, making it the ninth-largest brewery in the United States.

At the end of 1980, Schmidt's acquired the brands of crosstown rival Henry F. Ortlieb Brewing Co., whose brewery was closed in early 1981. Ortlieb's had produced about 250,000 barrels in 1980. This acquisition left Schmidt's as the only brewer in Philadelphia.

The US beer market had changed dramatically in the 1970s, and in the process, the brand images of many "popular-priced" regional beers, including Schmidt's, suffered. Like most regional beers, Schmidt's was sold as a "popular-priced" beer, the market segment of beers that cost less than the "premium" beers produced by national brewers. In the 1930s and 1940s, national brewers based in Milwaukee and St. Louis incurred relatively high costs transporting their beer to markets in the east and west. To cover these costs, they touted their beer as "premium" and charged more for it. They justified their higher prices by claiming that their beer was superior in taste, supposedly because of superior brewing skill and methods utilized at their breweries. Eventually, the national brewers, such as Anheuser-Busch, reduced transportation costs by opening breweries around the country, but the premium prices and images remained, and higher profit margins resulted. The increased profits could then be used to pay for more advertising, further boosting the images of the premium brands. In 1970, popular-priced beer held 58.3% of the US market, compared to 37.6% for premium beer. In 1970, the Philip Morris Company acquired sole ownership of the Miller Brewing Company. It then brought the sophisticated marketing techniques and huge advertising budgets of the tobacco industry to the beer business. Other national brewers of premium brands, especially Anheuser-Busch, responded with huge advertising expenditures of their own. The increased advertising in the 1970s and the higher prices already charged for premium national brands like Budweiser further bolstered consumer perceptions that premium beers were superior in quality to popular-priced regional brands like Schmidt's.

There was, however, little to no discernible difference between the taste of most premium and popular beers, and the amount of money it cost brewers to produce premium and popular brands was about the same. (The cost of beer packaging was about five times more than the cost of its ingredients). Although Schmidt's was a popular-priced beer, it was generally well-regarded by beer aficionados, and in 1977 won one-on-one blind taste tests against Budweiser, Miller, and Schlitz beers. Nevertheless, popular-priced beers steadily lost market share during the 1970s to more expensive premium beers that had more appealing brand images, and, consistent with this trend, sales of Schmidt's beer started to decline in 1974. By 1980, premium brands held 60% of the US market, while popular-priced brands had only a 14.8% share. (A new category, light beer, comprised another 12.5% of the market in 1980 and was dominated by Miller and Anheuser-Busch, whose light beers, which were sold at premium and super-premium prices, held about 83% of the category). Young drinkers especially gravitated to more expensive beers, and Schmidt's increasingly had a brand image as a beer that older blue-collar workers drank. Schmidt's attempted to appeal to younger drinkers by redesigning its label and launching a $3 million advertising campaign in 1979 that featured comedian David Brenner and singer Lou Rawls, but it did not turn the brand around. In 1982, a Schmidt's executive acknowledged that there was local prejudice in Philadelphia against its regular beer.

By 1982, Schmidt's was only brewing at 66% of its capacity. Given the low profit margins for its popular-priced beers, Schmidt's set its sights on the premium and super-premium sectors. In April 1982, Schmidt's launched a premium priced beer, Christian Schmidt Golden Classic. Extensive consumer research was performed in order to develop the taste of Golden Classic and an expensive advertising campaign was launched to support it. Although sales were initially 150,000 barrels a year, they dwindled to around 20,000 barrels within a few years. Another new brand, Christian Schmidt's Select, was intended to compete with super-premiums and imports, but it was not successful either.

In early 1982, Schmidt's also made an unsuccessful bid to purchase Pabst Brewing Company (which was five times larger than Schmidt's) for $200 million.

Despite Schmidt's poor financial shape, its Philadelphia plant continued to be impressive. The 1914 brew house, the architecture of which had been described as elaborate, yet tasteful and practical when it opened, remained in use. A marble staircase led to the brew house floor, where there were three 750-barrel brewing kettles. Above the kettle floor there were multiple tiers, including a mezzanine, that were reminiscent of an opera hall and a control room from which production was monitored using modern computers. After it left the brew house, lager and ale were fermented and stored in separate buildings. The Ale Storage building, which had been built as part of the 1930s building program and completed around 1940, was particularly impressive. In the 1980s it was still called "the new ale cellar". In it, ale was still fermented in tall open wooden fermenters made of California redwood and then aged in wooden storage tanks. It was virtually a microbrewery inside the main plant.

Another source of continuity at Schmidt's was William A. Hipp. Hipp was a third generation brewmaster for Schmidt's. His grandfather William Hipp had become brewmaster in 1892, when Christian Schmidt was still running the firm, and held that position until 1921. His father Arthur H. P. Hipp was brewmaster from 1921 to 1944. William A. Hipp joined Schmidt's in 1940, shortly after receiving a degree in agricultural biological chemistry from Penn State. After service in the Army during World War II, he returned to Schmidt's in 1946. He worked his way up to become assistant brewmaster, safety director, and then brewmaster in 1956. In 1959, he was promoted to production manager, and in 1962 became vice president in charge of production, a position he held until the mid-1980s. Described as one of the last of the gentlemen brewers, Hipp was bright, thorough, and knew how to handle people. Under his supervision, every morning a panel of taste testers sampled batches of the Schmidt's products produced the previous day to make sure that their taste and quality was consistent. Hipp was the first recipient of the Master Brewers Association of the Americas' Award of Honor and that organization later established a scholarship in his name.

Schmidt's briefly contract brewed Rolling Rock Beer at its Cleveland brewery in 1983 after a strike closed Rolling Rock's Latrobe, Pennsylvania plant. The striking Rolling Rock workers were members of AFL–CIO affiliated unions, and the Teamsters Union that represented Schmidt's workers refused to support them unless they joined the Teamsters.

Schmidt's still produced more than 3.15 million barrels of beer a year in 1983, but after more than a decade of criminal investigations into his practices and allegations of ties to organized crime, Billy Pflaumer was convicted in 1983 of a false billing scheme involving his trucking company, in which he had evaded paying $125,000 in excise taxes in three states.

Schmidt's Cleveland brewery was closed in 1984 in order to cut costs. The Cleveland brewery had employed about 200 workers, while the Philadelphia brewery had a workforce of 1,400 in 1984.

After his appeals failed, Pflaumer began serving a three-year sentence in 1986. Production of the Schmidt's brands slumped to about 1.6 million barrels in 1986, barely half of what it had produced three years earlier. Schmidt's market share in the Philadelphia area, which had been 33% in 1962, was said to be between 5% and 12% in 1986. Although regional brewers across the country faced declining sales in the 1980s, industry trends alone did not account for Schmidt's sharp drop in business. Several other factors were advanced by observers to account for Schmidt's declining business. First, Pflaumer's ability to manage the company was limited while he was incarcerated. Second, Schmidt's exhausted its advertising and promotion resources when it introduced the unsuccessful Schmidt's Golden Classic brand in 1982, and there was a lack of advertising and other marketing efforts to promote Schmidt's brands after that time. Third, as a distributor Pflaumer had antagonized many other Schmidt's distributors by encroaching on their territory and aggressively attempting to purchase their territorial distribution rights. The bitterness this caused led some distributors to not actively promote Schmidt's brands. Finally, Pflaumer's criminal conviction tainted the public perception of Schmidt's and hurt sales.

In 1987, Schmidt's largest creditor, Crown Cork & Seal Co., called in loans totaling about $24 million, which forced Pflaumer to sell the company. Pflaumer received a three-day furlough from prison to return to Philadelphia to negotiate the sale of the brewery. In early April 1987, the G. Heileman Brewing Company of La Crosse, Wisconsin, reached an agreement to purchase Schmidt's brands. The terms of the sale required Heileman to pay royalties over an eight-year period on the Schmidt' brands that it produced, subject to an advance royalty payment of $23.5 million made in 1987. Pflaumer apparently wanted to sell the brewery plant as well, but Heileman declined, and the brewery closed.

The closing of Schmidt's brewery in 1987 marked the first time in over 300 years that there was no brewery operating in the city of Philadelphia.

After Heileman bought Schmidt's brands, Schmidt's was produced at Heileman's brewery in Baltimore. Heileman also owned the brands of the unrelated Jacob Schmidt Brewing Company of Saint Paul, Minnesota. In 1992, Heileman began using identical packaging for the "Schmidt's" beer it marketed in the Philadelphia area and the "Schmidt" beer it sold in Minnesota, although it said that different recipes continued to be used for each region. After 1992, the beer was sometimes marketed as "Schmidt's", while at other times it was called "Schmidt", and labels could incorporate elements derived from both the Philadelphia and Minnesota beers. Heileman's brands were acquired by Stroh Brewing Co. in 1996. In 1999, Stroh's closed and its Schmidt's-related brands were sold to Pabst. As of 2019, a "Schmidt" beer was produced by Pabst, but its packaging was derived entirely from the Minnesota beer. Some other old Schmidt's of Philadelphia brands are still owned by Pabst. The trademarks of some other Schmidt's brands have been sold, while still others were allowed to lapse and have now been acquired by other brewers.

=== Brewery demolition ===
After the brewery closed, the property stood vacant for thirteen years. In 2000, real estate developer Bart Blatstein purchased the complex at sheriff's auction for $1.8 million. The property, including all 26 of its buildings, were demolished shortly after the purchase. Plans for redeveloping the site were proposed, protested, and stalled numerous times. In May 2009 the Piazza at Schmidt's, a $150 million retail, restaurant, and apartment complex, opened on the former brewery grounds.

== Schmidt's brands ==
Early beers produced by C. Schmidt & Sons were Pilsner, a pale beer, and Puritan, a dark beer. They were produced from the early 1890s until at least 1912. By 1915, Schmidt's main offerings were called Schmidt's Light and Schmidt's Dark, which may have been the old Pilsner and Puritan beers with new names.

Within several years of the repeal of Prohibition in 1933, the company was again producing Schmidt's Light and Schmidt's Dark beers, as well as Tiger Head Cream Ale, Tiger Head Porter and Burton ale, which last three brands had been made before Prohibition by the Schmidt owned Robert Smith Ale Company. A seasonal bock was also produced.

During most of the years after Prohibition, the only Schmidt's brands produced on a regular basis were Schmidt's beer and Tiger Head Ale. In the 1970s, the company expanded the Schmidt's product line. Beers produced in the 1970s and 1980s under the Schmidt's name included:

=== Schmidt's of Philadelphia ===
This was Schmidt's flagship brand, accounting for 90 percent of the brewery's sales in the late 1970s. Before Prohibition and immediately after repeal, it was called "Schmidt's Light Beer" (with "light" describing color, not calorie content). In the 1940s its name was changed to "Schmidt's of Philadelphia Light Beer". Its name was shortened in the mid-1970s to "Schmidt's of Philadelphia", and shortened further in 1979 to "Schmidt's", its commonly used name. In 1978, it was described as having "deep gold color, good malty aroma with hops noticeable only in the background, a bright and crisp beer with lots of character, good hop-malt balance, clean and zesty, a good aftertaste." In 1982 beer writer Michael Jackson wrote that Schmidt's was "fairly full-bodied and slightly estery, has more character than many U.S. lagers".

When Schmidt's closed in 1987, Schmidt's and Schmidt's Light (the reduced calorie beer) accounted for 75 percent of the brewery's production.

After Heileman acquired Schimidt's brands, it brewed Schmidt's at its brewery in Baltimore. Longtime Schmidt's drinkers said that the Baltimore-brewed beer did not taste the same. After production was transferred to Baltimore, Heileman launched a new advertising campaign in Philadelphia with the slogan "Where I Live, it's Schmidt's". Heileman also owned the brands of the unrelated Jacob Schmidt Brewing Company of St. Paul, Minnesota. In 1992, Heileman began using identical packaging for the Schmidt's beer it marketed in the Philadelphia area and the Schmidt beer it sold in Minnesota. This has meant that, since 1992, the beer has sometimes been marketed as "Schmidt's" beer, while at other times it has been called "Schmidt". Even though they shared identical packaging, Heileman announced that the Philadelphia- and Minnesota-marketed beers would continue to be brewed using different recipes. After the Baltimore brewery was closed in 1996, production of Schmidt's was moved to Wisconsin, and later to Allentown, Pennsylvania.

In the 2005, Victory Brewing Company of Downingtown, Pennsylvania introduced Throwback Lager, using a pre-Prohibition recipe and Schmidt's yeast. Around 2008 it released another batch of Throwback Lager using a different recipe and Schmidt's yeast. Former Schmidt brewmaster Bill Moeller provided input into the formulation of the recipe used in 2008.

The strain of yeast used to produce Schmidt's beer, Wyeast 2272, is still commercially available.

==== Advertising slogans ====
- None Better Since 1860 – Used from the time immediately following repeal until the 1940s.
- Beer As Beer Should Be – Introduced during World War II, it was Schmidt's main slogan from the 1940s to the 1960s; it continued to be used in the 1970s.
- For The 1 Man In 4 (Who Wants The Beer With Full-Strength Taste) – Used in the late 1950s and early 1960s.
- Full Taste Beer – Used in the early 1960s.
- For That Friendlier Feeling! – Used in the early 1960s.
- One Beautiful Beer – Schmidt's main slogan from around 1964 to the 1970s; it continued to be used until 1987.
- Give Your Thirst A Taste Of Life – Used in the early 1970s.
- Tell The World You Know What You're Doing – Introduced in 1973.
- The Easy Beer (The E-E-E-Easy Beer)- Introduced in 1974 and used during most of the 1970s.
- To Taste It Is To Love It – Introduced in 1979.
- Settle Back With Schmidt's – Introduced in 1981.
- Where I Live, It's Schmidt's – Introduced in 1987 by Heileman.

=== Schmidt's Light ===
Although Schmidt's had produced a reduced calorie light beer since it acquired the Brew 96 brand from Duquesne Brewing in 1972, and the light beer segment of the market had experienced phenomenal growth after Miller Brewing's successful national introduction of Miller Lite in 1975, it was not until 1978 that a light beer was introduced under the Schmidt's brand name.

=== Schmidt's Tiger Head Ale ===
This was a brand that the Schmidt brothers acquired in 1896 when they purchased the Robert Smith India Pale Ale brewery, which traced its establishment to 1774 and was then America's oldest brewing concern. Tiger Head Ale continued to be produced at the Robert Smith brewery plant until the start of Prohibition. In 1934, after Prohibition had ended, Schmidt's resumed brewing Tiger Head Cream Ale at its plant. Schmidt's assured customers that Tiger Head Cream Ale was still being brewed in accordance with Robert Smith's original formula which was said to date to 1774. In the 1940s, the name of the brand was shortened to Tiger Head Ale and Schmidt's continued brewing the ale until it closed in 1987. In 1978 it was described as having "deep gold color with a tinge of brown, very little aroma, light taste and slightly on the bitter side, great bitterness in the finish. Not unpleasant and reasonably good for the type, but not very alelike." In the 1980s, Tiger Head Ale was noted to be a top-fermenting ale that derived a lot of character from its yeast and was hopped twice in the kettle but was, nevertheless, fairly mild.

=== Schmidt's Bock Beer ===
Schmidt's practice of releasing a bock beer in the Spring started in the 1800s. In March 1934 – the first Spring after Repeal – Schmidt's resumed the tradition. Although production of bock beer was discontinued in 1969, it was successfully brought back in 1977. The description of it contained in the Great American Beer Book was: "very dark brown, sweet aroma, almost no flavor at all, and very little aftertaste." In 1984 Schmidt's brewmaster William Hipp noted that demand for its bock beer easily exceeded production.

=== Kodiak Cream Ale ===
Introduced in early 1976, largely in response to the success of Genesee Cream Ale. Kodiak was brewed for a couple of years and was not successful.

=== Schmidt's Oktoberfest Beer ===
Introduced in 1977 as a seasonal beer. It was produced several years. In 1978 it was described as "tawny, slightly roasted malt aroma; light but very pleasant malt flavor; low in hops; very good for quaffing; light, almost watery finish. A pleasant little brew that is worth a try."

=== Schmidt's Bavarian Beer ===
Introduced in 1977 as a replacement to Duquesne Bavarian, it used the same packaging design as the Duquesne beer, although it tasted different. In 1978 it was described as having very little aroma, and slightly sour taste with a brief finish.

=== Christian Schmidt Golden Classic ===
Supported by an expensive advertising campaign when launched in April 1982, Golden Classic was Schmidt's attempt to add a premium beer to its product line. Extensive blind tests of Budweiser and Miller drinkers were performed that indicated that American beer drinkers do not really like the taste of beer, or at least what Europeans consider beer. Rather, American drinkers prefer beer that has little beer taste and especially dislike the bitterness imparted by hops. Consequently, Schmidt's gave its Golden Classic a low flavor profile.

=== Christian Schmidt's Select ===
Select was Schmidt's attempt to add a super-premium beer to its product line. Both it and Golden Classic (see above) were ultimately unsuccessful.

=== Break Special Lager ===
Break Special Lager was a low (1.74%) alcohol beer introduced in late 1983 in response to growing concern about drunk driving and health. It was not successful.

=== Classic Golden Hawk Malt Liquor ===
Introduced in 1984.

=== Miscellaneous brands ===
==== Barnegat Lighthouse Premium Beer ====
A private label brand that was produced in association with Spirits Unlimited stores of New Jersey. Barnegat Lighthouse Premium Beer was released in the summer of 1986 (Schmidt's last summer in business) and sold at Jersey Shore stores located in Ocean and Monmouth Counties. It sold very well and was attributed on its packaging to Christian Schmidt Brewing Company.

==== Kool Mule (Rheingold Brewery) ====
A flavored malt liquor, it was originated by Schmidt's in 1981 but attributed to Rheingold.

==== U.S.A. (U.-S.ave-A.lot) Beer ====
U.S.A. (U.-S.ave-A.lot) Beer was originated by Schmidt's for the Ohio market during the economic downturn of 1981 in response to the then popular generic product lines. It was attributed to Pilsner Brewing Co. of Cleveland, Ohio.

==== Birell ====
Birell is a non-alcohol beer that was originated by the Hurlimann brewery of Zurich, Switzerland. It was brewed by Schmidt's in the 1980s (but attributed to Swiss Gold AG) under an agreement with Hurlimann. It had been brewed by Ortlieb's prior to Schmidt's acquisition of the brewery in 1980. Birell is produced using a special yeast that produces virtually no alcohol, which is unlike the process used to make most non-alcohol beers, which start as full-strength beer that then undergo processing to remove the alcohol.

== Acquired breweries ==
Between 1896 and 1954 Schmidt's purchased three other brewing companies, including their plants and brands. It also purchased two different brewing plants in Cleveland, Ohio, but it did not acquire any brands with those purchases. The three acquired brewing companies were:

=== Robert Smith Ale Brewery ===
(Brewery operated by Schmidt's from 1896 to 1920; brand produced until 1987)

The Robert Smith Brewery traced its establishment to 1774, when Joseph Potts operated a brewery in Philadelphia on the corner of Fifth and Minor Streets (approximately 400 feet north of Independence Hall). (Actually, Potts' brewery opened between 1765 and 1768, but for some reason the Robert Smith Brewery claimed to be established in 1774). In 1786, Potts' brewery was sold to Henry Pfeiffer, whose surname was later Anglicized to Pepper. Three generations of the Pepper family thereafter owned and operated the brewery. In 1837, ownership of the brewery passed to a partnership consisting of David Pepper, Robert Smith and Frederick Seckel. Robert Smith was a native of England and had been trained as a brewer at the Bass brewery at Burton-on-Trent, England. After the deaths of David Pepper in 1840 and Frederick Seckel in 1849, Robert Smith became the sole owner of the brewery. He would later admit his sons into the business. Reportedly, Christian Schmidt learned the brewing business while working at the Smith brewery in the 1850s. Smith's brewery was renowned for producing high-quality ales. In 1887, the Robert Smith India Pale Ale Brewing Co. was incorporated, and on March 28, 1888, brewing operations were moved to a large new Robert Smith brewery located at Thirty-Eighth Street and Girard Avenue in West Philadelphia. The old brewery was then demolished to make way for a new trust company building. Until operations were moved to the new plant, the Robert Smith brewery located at Fifth and Minor Streets had been in continuous operation since 1774, with the exception of a time during the Revolutionary War when it was used to house occupying British troops.

In 1891, the Robert Smith brewery obtained a trademark for the tiger's head logo that was placed on its ale and stout, a logo that it had been using since 1840. In 1893, Robert Smith died at the age of 91. By 1896, the brewery was experiencing financial difficulty and went into receivership. In December 1896, the Schmidt brothers bought the brewery and other assets of the Robert Smith India Pale Ale Brewing Co. A new Schmidt-owned company, the Robert Smith Ale Brewing Co., was formed to own and operate the Robert Smith brewery. Unlike the products of the Schmidt brewery, which were distributed locally, the ales and stouts of the Robert Smith brewery enjoyed a national reputation and were widely distributed. The Schmidt-owned Robert Smith brewery continued to brew Tiger Head Ale claiming that it was still made according to Robert Smith's original formula. The Robert Smith brewery at Thirty-Eighth Street and Girard Avenue operated until 1920, when it closed due to Prohibition. Before it closed, the Robert Smith Ale Brewery was recognized as the oldest brewing concern in the United States. After the repeal of Prohibition, Schmidt's resumed brewing Tiger Head Ale at its own brewery, and it continued to be made until 1987.

=== Peter Schemm & Son Brewery ===
(Brewery operated by Schmidt's from 1908 to 1918)

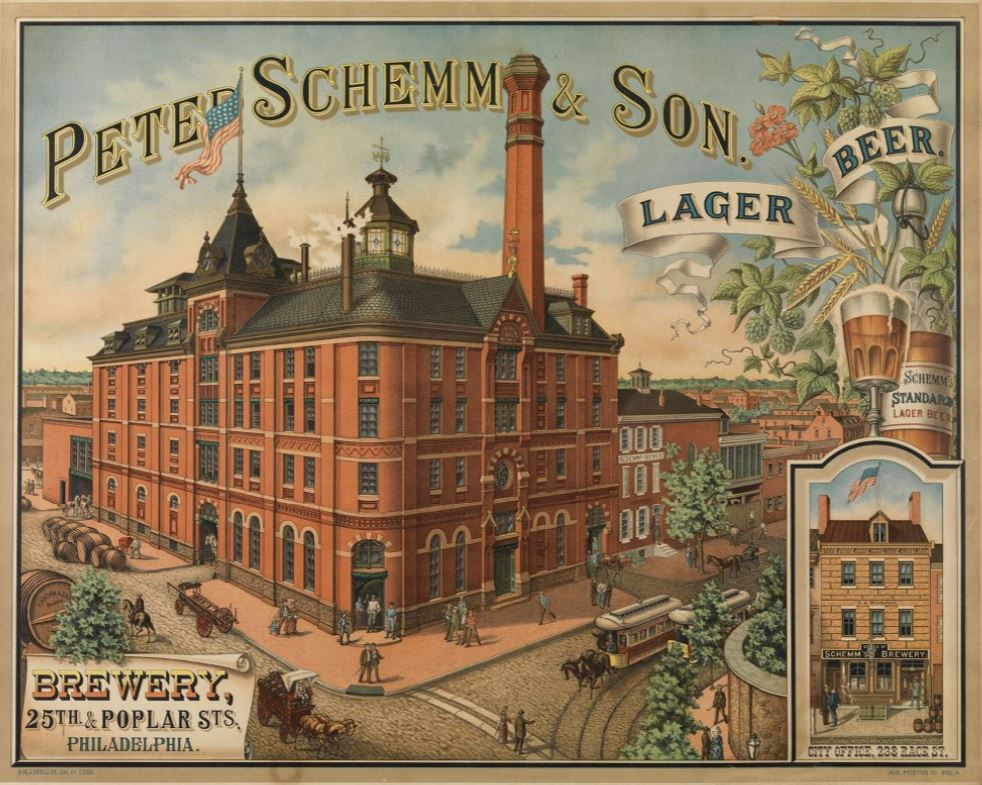
Peter Schemm & Son Brewery, Philadelphia, late 1800s

Peter Schemm was an early lager brewer in Philadelphia. In 1849 he and Louis Bergdoll opened a lager brewery near Fifth and Vine Streets. After Schemm's partnership with Bergdoll was dissolved, Schemm and another partner established a brewery in 1856 at the northwest corner of Twenty-fifth and Poplar Streets. Eventually, Schemm became sole proprietor and in 1885 he built an expanded brewery at the Twenty-fifth and Poplar Streets location. In 1887 Schemm's son, Peter A., was admitted to the firm and eventually assumed management of it. By 1894 the brewery was capable of producing 50,000 barrels a year. In 1898 the elder Schemm, despondent over his loss of eyesight, took his own life by jumping off a bridge about 1,000 feet upstream from Niagara Falls. In late 1908, all of the assets of the Peter Schemm & Son, including its brewing plant, were purchased by The Robert Smith Ale Brewing Company that was owned by the Schmidt's family. Thereafter Peter Schemm & Son was operated as a branch of The Robert Smith Ale Brewing Company, and it produced light and dark beers as well as a seasonal bock. In 1918 the Peter Schemm & Son brewery was closed due to war taxes and the effects of World War I rationing, which resulted in an inability to obtain ingredients to make beer.

=== Adam Scheidt Brewing Co. ===
(Brewery operated by Schmidt's from 1954 to 1974; brands produced until 1987)

Born in Bavaria, Germany in 1854, Adams Scheidt moved to Norristown, Pennsylvania in 1878, where his brother Charles owned a brewery. Adam became a partner in the firm, which by 1879, was known as C. & A. Scheidt & Co. Adam Scheidt became sole proprietor of the brewery in 1884 after Charles died. Adam Scheidt died in 1933, and the company was led by his son (also named Adam Scheidt) until it was purchased by Schmidt's in 1954. It was producing about 500,000 barrels annually when it was acquired by Schmidt's. Schmidt's continued operating the old Scheidt brewery in Norristown (which it renamed the Valley Forge Brewing Co. in 1960) until late 1974, when it was closed and production moved to Philadelphia.

=== Adam Scheidt Brands produced by Schmidt's ===
==== Valley Forge ====
Scheidt began producing Valley Forge Special Beer before Prohibition, and resumed producing it in 1933 as soon as Prohibition was over. The name was shortened to Valley Forge Beer in 1935, and in the 1960s became Valley Forge Old Tavern Beer. After the Norristown brewery was closed in 1974, production was shifted to Schmidt's Philadelphia brewery.

==== Rams Head Ale ====
Dubbed by Scheidt as "The Aristocrat of Ales", Rams Head Pale Ale was another beer that was produced immediately after the repeal of Prohibition in 1933. Within several years its name was shortened to Rams Head Ale. It was said to be brewed from an original old English formula.

==== Prior Beer ====
A Bohemian pilsner, Prior was introduced by Adam Scheidt brewery in 1940 after Pilsner Urquell became unavailable in America due to World War II. Prior Beer was brewed using a recipe developed by Arthur Kallman, the American representative of Pilsner Urquell. It took its name from Prior, a Czech beer it sought to copy. Due to its popularity, production rose from 1,000 barrels in 1940 to 100,000 barrels in 1946. For many years, its slogan was "Liquid Luxury". After Schmidt's acquired the Adam Scheidt brewery, Prior was Schmidt's premium brand. It was believed that a condition of the sale of Adam Scheidt Brewery to Schmidt's was that the original Prior recipes would continue to be used. It was later called Prior Preferred Beer.

==== Prior Double Dark ====
This was considered by many to be the best dark beer in pre-craft brew America. A Munich style dark, Prior Double Dark was first produced in 1947 using another recipe developed by Arthur Kallman. In 1978, it was described as "very dark in color, light malty nose, malty flavor ever so slightly on the sour side, long clean finish, long-pleasing aftertaste." Prior Double Dark was contract-brewed in the 1990s by the F.X. Matt Brewery of Utica, New York for the McSorley's Ale House in New York City.

==== Twentieth Century Ale ====
Twentieth Century Ale was one of Scheidt's most popular products before Prohibition. It was revived in the mid-1980s, when it was attributed to the Adam Scheidt Brewing Co. of Philadelphia.

==== Adam Scheidt's Lager Beer ====
Produced in the mid- 1980s, it was also attributed to the Adam Scheidt Brewing Co.

==== Casey's Lager Beer ====
Attributed to Valley Forge Brewing Co., Casey's Lager Beer was released in the fall of 1980 in four different collector cans that featured Hall of Fame baseball players Richie Ashburn, Whitey Ford, Monte Irvin and Duke Snider.

==== Tudor Premium ====
Tudor was the A&P Supermarket chain's private label. Tudor Premium beer was brewed by Schmidt's for A&P in the mid-1970s and was attributed to Valley Forge Brewing Co. Other brewers produced Tudor for A&P at other times.

==== Tudor Ale ====
The ale that was produced by Schmidt's for A&P in the mid-1970s. Like its Tudor Premium beer counterpart, it was attributed to Valley Forge Brewing Co.

== Brands acquired from other brewers ==
Between 1972 and 1980, Schmidt's purchased the brands, but not the brewing plants, of the five brewing companies listed below. Some of these companies had, in turn, bought brands from yet other breweries. In 1981 Schmidt's said that many of its acquired brands continued to be brewed using their original formulas, and specifically mentioned Rheingold, Reading and Ortlieb's as such brands.

=== Duquesne Brewing Co. (1972–1987) ===
Founded on Pittsburgh's South Side in 1899; in 1905 Duquesne Brewing Co. joined a coalition of brewers that became the Independent Brewing Co. After an attempt to reform the Independent Brewing Co. failed in 1932, Duquesne Brewing Co. was reorganized under its original charter. It then purchased the remaining assets of the Independent Brewing Co., which included six breweries. It continued to operate three of the breweries, including the one on the South Side of Pittsburgh. In 1950 it built a large new brewery on the South Side capable of producing 2,000,000 barrels a years. At one time, Duquesne was one of the 10 largest breweries in the United States. Although production surpassed 1,000,000 by the late 1950s, sales never grew as expected. By 1972, sales had dropped to about 625,000 barrels a year and the brewery was experiencing financial difficulty. After an August 1972 strike, it was announced in October of that year that the brewery was closing and its brands being sold to Schmidt's. Schmidt's then shifted production of Duquesne's beers to Cleveland, announcing that it had no plans to change their recipes. More than 600 Pittsburgh workers lost their jobs when the Duquesne brewery closed and bitter feelings resulting from the closing prompted vandalism of the brewery building and a boycott of the Schmidt's-produced beers. Sales of Schmidt's-produced Duquesne brands in Pittsburgh plunged.

==== Duke Beer ====
This was the flagship brand of the Duquesne Brewing Co. Calling itself "The Prince of Pilseners", Duke cans and bottle labels typically included the image of a young man in princely attire lifting a glass of beer. According to labels, Duke beer was brewed according to an exclusive age-old recipe that called for "an extra full measure of natural rich barley and corn plus the choicest seedless hops that money can buy." Although Schmidt's continued using the "Prince" packaging for Duke beer initially, by the late 1970s the Prince was replaced by a Western inspired design that included a cowboy reminiscent of John Wayne. By the early 1980s, Duke beer tasted like Schmidt's regular beer. In 2010 the brand was revived as Duquesne Pilsener by Mark Dudash who had acquired lapsed trademarks of the brand. A former Duquesne brewmaster provided input in formulating the recipe for the revived beer, which features the Prince of Pilseners on its packaging.

==== Duke Ale ====
Duke Ale continued to be produced after the Schmidt's acquisition, but appears to have been discontinued by the late 1970s

==== Duquesne Bavarian Beer ====
Duquesne Bavarian continued to be produced until around 1977 when it was replaced by Schmidt's Bavarian, which used the same packaging design as the Duquesne beer, although it tasted different.

==== Brew 96 ====
Containing 96 calories per 12 ounces, Brew 96 was an early light beer that was produced by Duquesne by 1971. In response to growing sales of reduced calorie beers, Schmidt's increased advertising for Brew 96 in 1974 and 1975. Some advertising emphasized that Brew 96 wasn't promoted by Mickey Mantle or Whitey Ford (a reference to Miller Lite commercials), stating "We're the other beer – Brew 96 – Less calories for less money."

==== P.O.C. ====
P.O.C. was originally produced by Pilsner Brewing Co. of Cleveland, Ohio as early as 1914. No one knew for sure what "P.O.C." stood for, although some said that it meant "Pride of Cleveland", "Pilsner of Cleveland", "Pleasure on Call", or "Pilsner on Call". When Pilsner Brewing closed in 1963, Duquesne Brewing acquired the brand and moved production to Pittsburgh. After Schmidt's acquired the brand from Duquesne in 1972, production returned to Cleveland until 1984. (The labels on Schmidt's produced P.O.C. identified it as "Pilsner on Call"). In 1999 P.O.C. was resurrected in Cleveland by brewer Stuart Sheridan.

=== Reading Brewing Co. (1976–1987) ===
The Reading brewery was located at Ninth and Laurel streets in Reading, Pennsylvania. It was the successor to an old firm established in 1886, with roots going back to 1843. In 1975, the brewery was producing 200,000 barrels a year, but had become unprofitable because of rising costs. It was unable to recoup its losses due to competition from national breweries. The brewery closed in April 1976 and its brands were sold to Schmidt's, which moved production of Reading and Bergheim Beers to its Philadelphia brewery.

==== Reading Premium ====
This was Reading's flagship brand. Previously marketed as Old Reading Beer, in 1958 it was rebranded as Reading Premium with updated packaging and the slogan "The Friendly Beer for Modern People". By the early 1980s the Reading Premium produced by Schmidt's tasted the same as Schmidt's regular beer. Production of Reading Premium Beer has been revived in the 2000s by Pennsylvania brewers based on a pre-Prohibition Reading recipe. As of 2020 it is produced by Sly Fox Brewing Company.

==== Bergheim ====
This beer was produced as early as 1963. It was billed as Pennsylvania Dutch beer, was inexpensive, and was known for its attractive colorful label.

=== Rheingold Breweries, Inc. (1977–1987) ===
Rheingold Brewery was established in 1855 when Samuel Liebmann and his sons opened a brewery on Forrest Street in Brooklyn, New York. Liebmann, a German-Jew, had immigrated to the United States from Germany, where he had operated an inn and brewery near Stuttgart. S. Liebmann's Sons Brewing Co. gradually absorbed small brewing companies in the neighborhood and constantly modernized its brewery. In 1883, the Rheingold brand was introduced by Liebmann and quickly became very popular. Liebmann Brewing survived Prohibition producing near-beer and a malt and hops syrup. After the repeal of Prohibition in 1933, Liebmann became New York's largest brewer, a position it held for 30 years. The brewery expanded after World War II, opening breweries in the Bronx, New York; Orange, New Jersey; San Francisco, California and Los Angeles, California. By 1961, when the Bronx brewery was closed, Liebmann had downsized and only the Brooklyn and Orange breweries remained.

In 1964, the Liebmann family sold the business, which also included a soft drink operation, to Pepsi-Cola United Bottlers, Inc. and the name of the brewery was changed to Rheingold Breweries, Inc. Rheingold produced 4,236,000 barrels in 1965, but sales declined after then. It acquired Dawson Brewing Company in New Bedford, Massachusetts in 1967. The company struggled and by 1973 sales had slipped below 3,000,000 barrels annually. The coffee company Chock Full O' Nuts bought Rheingold, but could not turn it around. In 1976 the Brooklyn brewery was closed, in early 1977 the New Bedford brewery closed and in October 1977 the remainder of the company, including its brands, were sold to Schmidt's and the Orange brewery was closed.

From 1940 to 1965, the company sponsored the very popular "Miss Rheingold" beauty contest. New Yorkers were introduced to contestants through billboards, posters, magazines and newspapers and then cast votes for Miss Rheingold by ballot stuffers.

==== Rheingold Extra Dry Lager Beer ====
According to legend, in the early 1880s opera fan David Liebmann hosted a banquet for Anton Seidl, head of the Metropolitan Opera. For the occasion, a special beer was prepared, and because the final performance of the opera season was Das Rheingold, the beer was named Rheingold. The beer was later released to the public, and became very popular. In 1893 Rheingold was described as a pale table lager that was brewed from the best Canadian barley and the choicest New York state hops. In 1937 Rheingold Extra Dry Lager Beer was introduced. and quickly became a best seller. After Schmidt's acquired the Rheingold brands in 1977, it continued to produce Rheingold Extra Dry Lager Beer initially, but later rebranded it as Rheingold Premium. Heileman produced Rheingold after 1987, but it was retired by Stroh in the late 1990s. Since 1998 there have been several attempts to revive the brand.

==== Rheingold Extra Light Beer ====
A reduced calorie beer that was introduced in 1977.

==== Knickerbocker Natural ====
Originally produced by the Jacob Ruppert Brewing Co. in New York City, the Knickerbocker brand was acquired by Rheingold in 1965 when Ruppert went out of business. In 1967 Rheingold switched from using chemical preservatives to a more expensive natural preservation process. In 1973 Knickerbocker was rebranded as Knickerbocker Natural as part of Rheingold's marketing campaign that emphasized that its beers contained only natural ingredients and no preservatives. Labels on the beer stated that it was "brewed only with water, barley malt, corn and hops. Contains no additives." The labels of the Knickerbocker Natural brewed by Schmidt's no longer included the statement that it contained no additives. After Schmidt's went out of business in 1987, Knickerbocker Natural continued to be made by Heileman for at least several years.

==== Gablinger's Extra Light Beer ====
An influential beer, Gablinger's Beer was one of the first reduced calorie beers marketed in the United States, hitting the market in late 1966. Gablinger was brewed using a process invented by chemist Dr. Hersch Gablinger of Basel, Switzerland. During brewing, the enzymes found naturally in barley malt break down starches into fermentable sugar, but these enzymes cannot convert small starch fragments called dextrins into sugar. Consequently, after the normal brewing and fermentation process, dextrins remain in the finished beer and are digested as carbohydrates, providing the beer with about one-third of its calories, as well as some body. Dr. Gablinger's process involved adding an enzyme, amyloglucosidase, during production that converted the dextrins into fermentable sugar. The increased amount of fermentable sugar resulting from this process produced a beer with a higher alcohol content, but essentially no remaining dextrins to provide calories. Sterilized carbonated water was added at the end to bring the alcohol level of the beer down to normal levels. Without dextrins in the finished beer, it not only had fewer calories, it also provided no food to digest, which made it seem less filling. After Rheingold officials traveled to Europe and sampled Dr. Gablinger's beer, Rheingold bought the exclusive rights to use his process. Rheingold biochemist and brewer Joseph L. Owades then developed Gablinger Beer, which began to be test marketed in late 1966, and was rolled out in the New York City area in June 1967. The beer was attributed on its label to Forrest Brewing Co., a Rheingold subsidiary. Gablinger's Beer, which was marketed for "special diet use", ran afoul of conflicting federal laws that both required and prohibited its label from stating how many calories it contained. After being in and out of court for two years, Gablinger labels were allowed to state: "Has only ninety-nine calories, 1/3 less than our regular beers." In 1976 a new Gablinger's was introduced, Gablinger's Extra Light Beer, that had only 95 calories and which employed a longer brewing process. It was the Gablinger's Extra Light Beer brand that Schmidt's produced after its acquisition of Rheingold's labels in 1977.

=== Erie Brewing Co. (1978–1987) ===
The Erie Brewing Company traced its origins to 1847, when Charles Koehler, an immigrant from Holland, opened a brewery at 25th and Holland Streets in Erie, Pennsylvania. In 1899, the brewery founded by Koehler merged with two other local breweries (one of them owned by Jackson Koehler, a son of Charles Koehler) to form the Erie Brewing Company. Its beer was known for being brewed with the "Dutch touch" of legendary Uncle Jackson Koehler, who was depicted as elderly, bald and portly, and who became the trademark for the beer. In the mid-1970s, it was producing about 300,000 barrels annually, but suffered declining market shares. The firm was managed by descendants of Jackson Koehler until it closed in February 1978. Its labels and recipes were sold to Schmidt's, which brewed the old Erie products in Philadelphia or Cleveland. When the sale to Schmidt's was made, the president of Erie Brewing said "They have Uncle Jackson's secret now."

Erie Brewing produced a number of Koehler brands and it is possible that Schmidt's brewed other Erie brands not listed below.

==== Koehler Beer ====
"Brewed with the Dutch Touch", this was the flagship brand of the Erie Brewing Co. In 1978 the pre-Schmidt's Koehler Beer was described as having "pale color, good malty aroma, pleasant barley-malt flavor with some zest, a unique tangy finish, and clean refreshing after-taste. This is a fine product with a flavor quite different from those of the vast majority of American beers." After Schmidt's closed in 1987, Koehler Beer continued to be produced by Heileman. In 2018 the brand was revived when brothers Bruce and Bryan Koehler (who are not related to the original brewery owners) opened their Koehler Brewing Company brewery in Grove City, Pennsylvania. They had obtained some Koehler trademarks that had been allowed to expire, and former brewery workers provided them with old recipes of Koehler beers. Their pilsener is largely based on the recipe of the original Koehler beer.

==== Koehler Ale ====
Labels indicate that this ale continued to be produced by Schmidt's.

==== Light Lager ====
Introduced in 1976, this was a reduced calorie beer.

==== Olde Pub ====
Described as a "tavern brew beer". Olde Pub beer was still being sold by Schmidt's in the early 1980s in returnable bottles. It tasted like Schmidt's regular beer then.

==== Yacht Club ====
Introduced in 1962 to appeal to those who preferred a lighter bodied beer, in 1975 it was described in advertising as a light beer with a nice malt taste. Labels indicate that Yacht Club continued to be produced by Schmidt's.

==== Wunderbrau ====
A near beer, it was produced by Schmidt's in the mid-1980s.

=== Henry F. Ortlieb Brewing Co. (1981–1987) ===
Ortlieb's was founded by Trupert Ortlieb, a native of Baden, Germany who fought in the Union Army during the Civil War. After the war, Ortlieb opened a saloon in Philadelphia. He began brewing his own beer in 1869, after a supplier raised the prices he was charging for beer. In 1879, Ortlieb purchased a brewery on Third Street, south of Poplar, in the Northern Liberties section of the city, which he called Victor Brewery. His beer was highly regarded by connoisseurs. In 1894, Henry F. Ortlieb became president of the firm. Under his leadership, production grew from 2,000 barrels a year in 1894 to 30,000 barrels in 1919.

In 1933, Ortlieb's reportedly had a capacity of 100,000 barrels. Ortlieb's grew in the ensuing decades and after Esslinger's brewery closed in 1964, Ortlieb's and Schmidt's were Philadelphia's last two breweries. From 1945 to 1969, the company was led by President Joseph T. Ortlieb, the last surviving son of Truppert. "Uncle Joe", as he was universally known, began working at the Ortlieb brewery in 1892 and was the oldest brewmaster in the United States before his death at age 89 in 1969. In 1976, Joseph Ortlieb, grandson of Trupert, acquired sole ownership of the company. He appeared in radio and television commercials urging Philadelphians to "Try Joe's Beer". Ortlieb's was popular in working-class neighborhoods. In the late 1970s Joe Ortlieb bucked industry trends by refusing to introduce a light beer, claiming instead that adding three ice cubes to a beer had the same effect. In a publicity-generating move, in 1980 Ortlieb distributed 7-ounce bottles of "Ortlieb's Sparkling Carbonated Water" so drinkers could make their own light beer by mixing Ortlieb's water with Ortlieb's beer.

Ortlieb's sales peaked at 350,000 barrels in 1978. In 1979, sales slipped to 280,000 barrels. At the end of 1980, it was announced that Schmidt's had purchased Ortlieb's brands and that the Ortlieb brewery would close in March 1981. Described as a merger at the time, Joe Ortlieb became a Schmidt's officer. Two Ortlieb brands, Sean O'Shaughnessy Boar Head Stout and La Estrella Malta, were never produced by Schmidt's.

==== Ortlieb's (a.k.a. Joe's Beer) ====
Ortlieb's flagship brand. In 1978 it was described as being maltier, more full-bodied, and slightly darker than the national premium brands. The same year, Newsweek recognized Ortlieb's as one of America's best local brands, saying: "If W. C. Fields had stayed off gin and tried [Ortlieb's], he wouldn't have said all those nasty things about Philadelphia." After Schmidt's acquired the Ortlieb's brand, a public relations campaign was launched in which Joe Ortlieb assured customers that the taste of Ortlieb's beer was not changing, only the building where it was being brewed.

==== Kaier's Special Beer ====
In 1880 Charles D. Kaier opened a brewery in Mahanoy City, in the anthracite coal region of northeastern Pennsylvania. Production peaked at 200,000 barrels a year in the late 1940s. Production slipped to 107,000 barrels by 1960, in part because of the decline of the anthracite coal industry. In June 1966, Ortlieb's obtained a controlling interest in the Kaier brewery. Kaier's Mahanoy City brewery continued to operate until 1968, when the brewery was closed and production of Kaier's beer was moved to the Fuhrmann & Schmidt (F & S) brewery located in Shamokin, Pennsylvania. Ortlieb's had purchased the F & S brewery in early 1966. In January 1972, Ortlieb's sold the F & S brewery, and its new owners continued to produce Kaier's beer. The F & S brewery in Shamokin closed in 1974 and Ortlieb's continued to produce Kaier's Special Beer at its Philadelphia brewery. After it acquired the Ortlieb brands, Schmidt's continued to produce Kaier's Special Beer until at least 1985.

==== McSorley's Ale ====
This ale was originally brewed for the famous McSorley's Old Ale House, located at 15 East Seventh Street in Manhattan. Established in 1854, McSorley's Ale House is said to be the oldest continuously operating tavern in the United States. The tavern served only men until 1970, when a New York City law banning discrimination based on sex at public places went into effect. The original brewer of McSorley's Ale was Fidelio Brewery, which was founded in New York in 1852. Fidelio Brewery changed its name to The Greater New York Brewery in 1940. By 1947 McSorley's Ale was being brewed by Rheingold. After Schmidt's acquired Rheingold's labels in 1977, it quickly sold the McSorley's brand to Ortlieb's. Ortlieb's then produced McSorley's Ale under the supervision of brewmaster Bill Moeller. After Schmidt's acquired Ortlieb's in 1981, it hired Moeller and he oversaw production of McSorley's Ale in Schmidt's beautiful old-fashioned ale house. McSorley's Ale was considered by many to be one of the best ales in pre-craft brew America. The McSorley's Ale produced by Ortlieb's was described as "deep tawny brown color, big malty hop aroma, full flavored, good balance, plenty of hops yet not overly bitter, a very fine ale at a reasonable price." The McSorley's Ale brewed by Schmidt's was made using imported Hallertau hops, dry-hopping, and hop oils that imparted additional bouquet. It had 30 IBUs. Since the demise of Schmidt's in 1987, McSorley's Ale has been produced by Heileman, Stroh, and Pabst.

==== Coqui Malt Liquor ====
In 1973 Ortlieb began contract brewing Olde English 800 Malt Liquor for Blitz-Weinhard, a Portland, Oregon brewer that did not have a brewery on the East coast. After Pabst bought Blitz-Weinhard in 1979, the contact with Ortlieb was terminated and production of Olde English 800 was moved to Pabst plants in the East. Ortlieb responded by introducing its own brand, Coqui 900 Malt Liquor, which employed similar packaging to Olde English 800 and which may have even used the same recipe. Of the brands sold by Schmidt's in 1987, Coqui is one that enjoyed longevity and was still being produced in the mid-2010s.

== Company name history ==
- Christian Schmidt, Kensington Brewery 1861–1892
- C. Schmidt & Sons 1892–1902
- C. Schmidt & Sons Brewing Co. 1902–1933
- C. Schmidt & Sons, Inc. 1933–1979
- Christian Schmidt Brewing Co. 1979–1987

== See also ==
- List of breweries in Pennsylvania
