= Northern Liberties, Philadelphia =

Northern Liberties District
- Former District
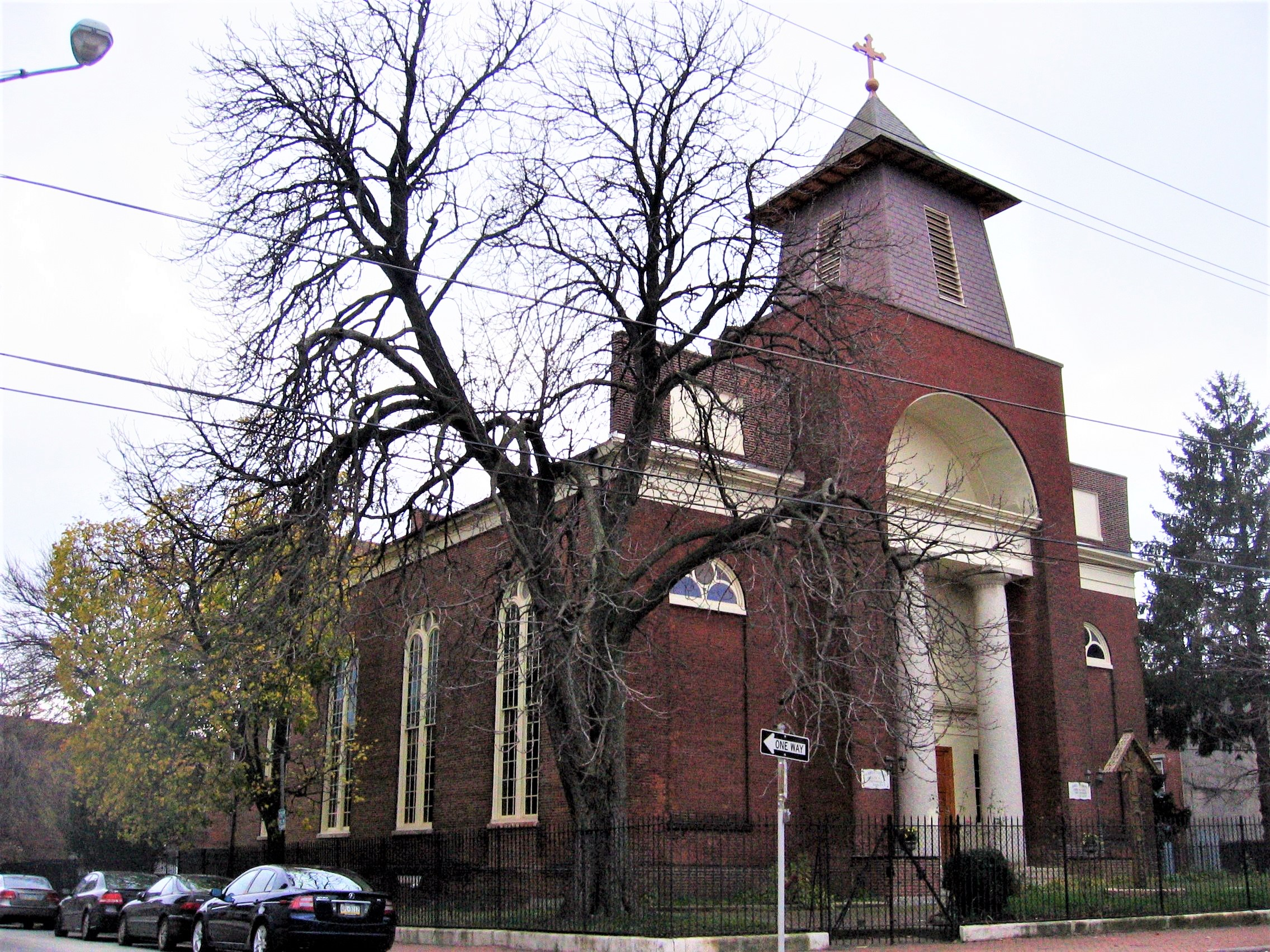
- St. John's Church

- Location of Kensington District in Pennsylvania Northern Liberties District (the United States)
- Coordinates: 39°57′47″N 75°08′42″W
- Country: United States
- State: Pennsylvania
- County: Philadelphia
- Time zone: UTC-5 (EST)
  - Summer (DST): UTC-4 (EDT)
- Area codes: 215, 267

- Northern Liberties Historic District
- U.S. National Register of Historic Places
- U.S. Historic district
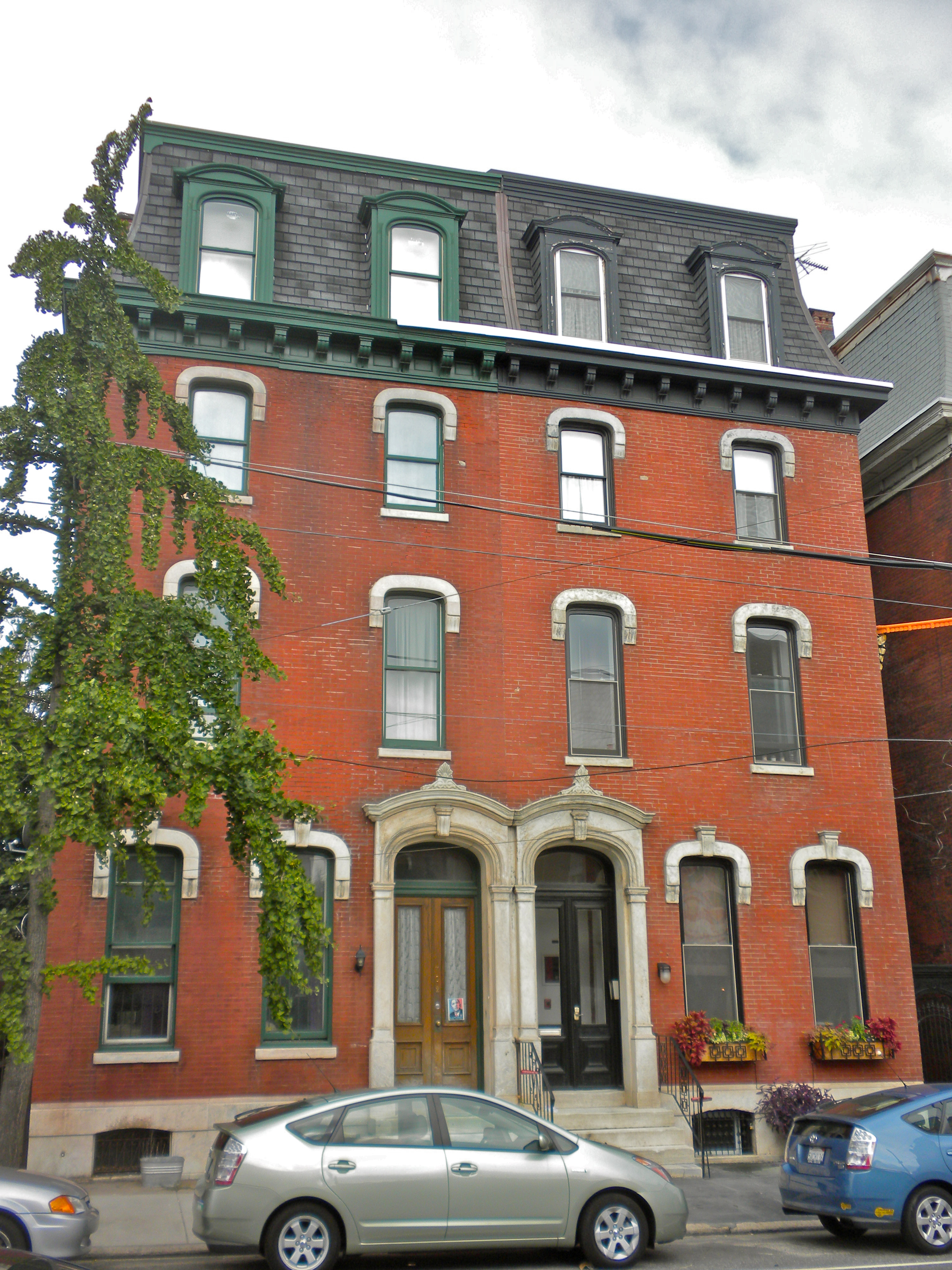
- Houses on North 5th Street

- Location within Philadelphia Location within Pennsylvania Location within the United States
- Location: Roughly bounded by Brown, Boone & Galloway, Green & Wallace, and Fifth & Sixth Sts. Philadelphia, Pennsylvania
- Coordinates: 39°57′47″N 75°08′42″W
- Area: 20.5 acres (8.3 ha)
- Built: 1791
- Architectural style: Greek Revival, Italianate, Federal
- NRHP reference No.: 85003471
- Added to NRHP: October 31, 1985

Northern Liberties is a neighborhood in Philadelphia, Pennsylvania, United States. It is north of Center City along the Delaware River. Prior to its incorporation into Philadelphia in 1854, it was among the top 10 largest cities in the U.S. in every census from 1790 to 1840, and 11th in 1850. It was a major manufacturing area that attracted many European immigrants in the late 19th and early 20th centuries. In the early 21st century, it has attracted many young professionals and new commercial and residential development.

== Boundaries ==
Northern Liberties is located north of Center City (specifically, Old City) and is bordered by Girard Avenue to the north; Callowhill Street to the south; North 6th Street to the west; and the Delaware River to the east (from Callowhill Street to Laurel Street; from Laurel Street to Girard Avenue the eastern boundary is North Front Street).

The historical boundaries were slightly different, with Vine Street as the southern border and the Cohocksink Creek serving as the northern border. The creek now flows as a storm sewer under the following streets (starting at the Delaware River and running from southeast to northwest): Canal, Laurel, Bodine, Cambridge, and Orkney Streets.

== History ==
Historical population
Census	Pop.	Note	%±
1790	9,913		—
1800	10,718		8.1%
1810	19,874		85.4%
1820	19,678		−1.0%
1830	28,872		46.7%
1840	34,474		19.4%
1850	47,223		37.0%
1790 and 1800 populations are for Northern Liberties Township before the district was incorporated.

Originally a portion of the Northern Liberties Township, the district first gained limited autonomy from the township by an Act of Assembly on March 9, 1771. The act provided for the appointment of persons to regulate streets, direction of buildings, etc. By March 30, 1791 a second act enabled the inhabitants of that portion of the Northern Liberties between Vine Street and Pegg's Run (Cohoquinoque Creek) and the middle of Fourth Street and the Delaware River to elect three commissioners to lay taxes for the purpose of lighting, watching and establishing pumps within those bounds.

During the yellow fever epidemics of the late eighteenth and early nineteenth centuries, the Northern Liberties district was hard hit, with many fatalities.

On March 28, 1803, the Legislature passed an act to incorporate that part of the township of the Northern Liberties lying between the west side of Sixth Street and the Delaware River and between Vine Street and Cohocksink Creek, thus creating the District of Northern Liberties. Under the Act of Consolidation, 1854, the district ceased to exist, and became a part of Philadelphia.

Early in its history, the location just outside Philadelphia allowed the area to thrive in manufacturing, as mills, breweries, leather tanneries, paints and chemical works, tool making factories, and iron and stove foundries once lined the neighborhood. It also holds the status as a famous red-light district in the United States. Prior to annexation, the township was created as a less densely populated alternative to nearby Philadelphia. Because of this, it was later known colloquially as "Philadelphia's first suburb."However, the Southwark neighborhood claims this distinction as well.

Artisan immigrants from Germany settled in the Northern Liberties in great numbers in the 19th century. In the first decades of the 20th century, the area saw an influx of immigrants from Eastern Europe. Numbers of Slovak and Romanians left the challenges they faced in the waning years of the Austro-Hungarian Empire. Slovaks established St. Agnes Slovak Roman Catholic Church at the intersection of Fourth and Brown Street. The Romanians who settled in the area established Holy Trinity Romanian Orthodox Church at the intersection of American and Brown Streets, where they and their descendants continue to worship.

From 1860 to 1987, the Christian Schmidt Brewing Company was located in Northern Liberties.

In 1985, the Northern Liberties Historic District was created, dedicated to preserving the Italianate architecture, Greek revival, and Federal style buildings which characterizes the area. The historic district is bounded by Brown, Boone and Galloway, Green and Wallace, and Fifth and Sixth Streets. The district encompasses 209 contributing buildings. It was added to the National Register of Historic Places in 1985. Also located in Northern Liberties and listed on the National Register of Historic Places are the Daniel Boone School, Burk Brothers and Company, Integrity Title Insurance, Trust and Safe Deposit Company, Thomas Jefferson School, Mifflin School, and St. John's Church.

== Today ==
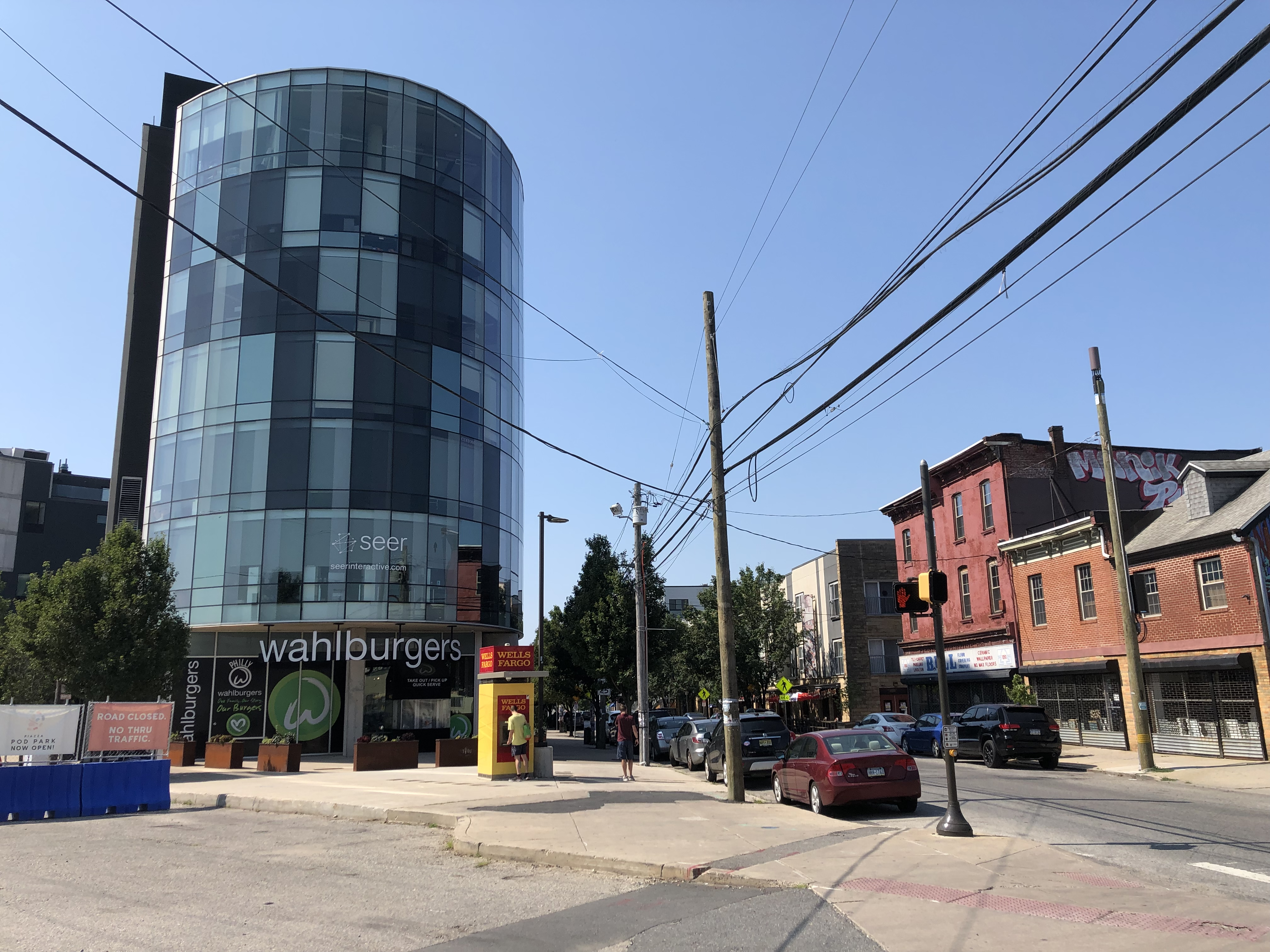
2nd Street

In recent years, Northern Liberties has become a major enclave of young professionals, students, artists, and design professionals. Large improvement and revitalization projects have also been undertaken recently, causing a large jump in property values. The neighborhood's proximity to Center City has made it one of the city's most desirable development districts, both for commercial and residential real estate. Like most Philadelphia neighborhoods, the housing stock is primarily made up of rowhouses, although new development in recent times has brought apartment and condominium complexes.

Northern Liberties contains two privately owned but public parks, both established and owned by non-profits run by the neighbors. Orianna Hill Park is known as an off-leash area for dogs; the other, Liberty Lands, is a 2-acre (8,100 m^{2}) park and playground.

Northern Liberties is served by SEPTA's Market–Frankford El with stops at Spring Garden and Girard. The station at Spring Garden is unique for being in the median of I-95. The elevated line's tracks then break away from the expressway's right-of-way to tower over Front Street through the neighborhood as it heads north away from Center City.

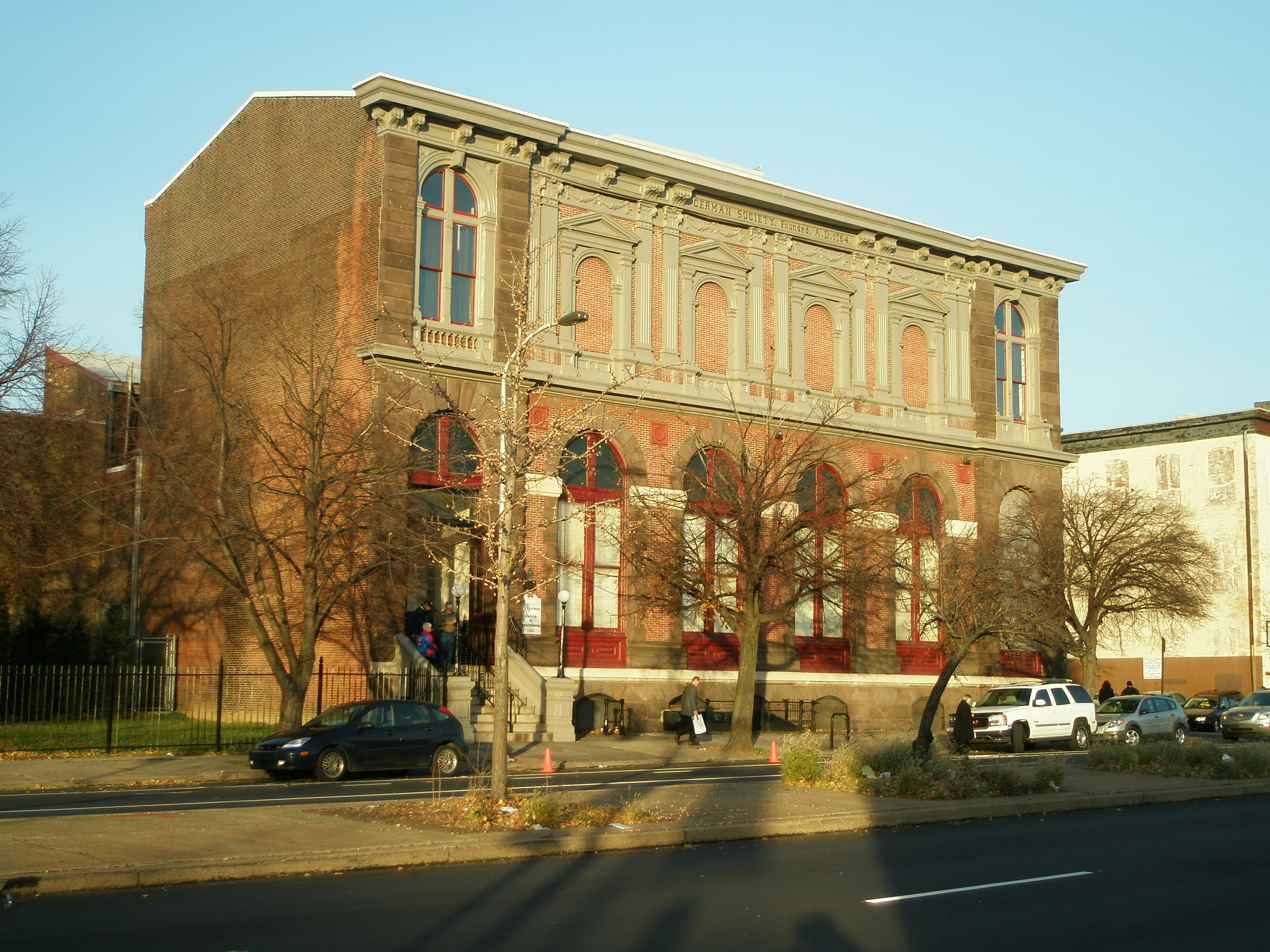
German Society of Pennsylvania

In 2005, service resumed on SEPTA's long-delayed Girard Avenue trolley at the northern boundary of the neighborhood.

The doughboy statue, erected in memory of ward residents who served in World War I, is a long-honored landmark of Northern Liberties. Northern Liberties, an area of the city geographically categorized as north of Old City and bordered by Girard Avenue to the north; Callowhill Street to the south; North 6th Street to the west; and the Delaware River to the east - locals refer to it as NoLibs. In 2012, Forbes named NoLibs as making #14 among their annual list of the 20 "Hippest Hipster Neighborhoods" in America.

== Economy ==
The area is home to numerous boutique stores and small bars and restaurants.

Yards Brewing Company is located in Northern Liberties. The SEER Interactive headquarters are also located in the neighborhood.

== Education ==
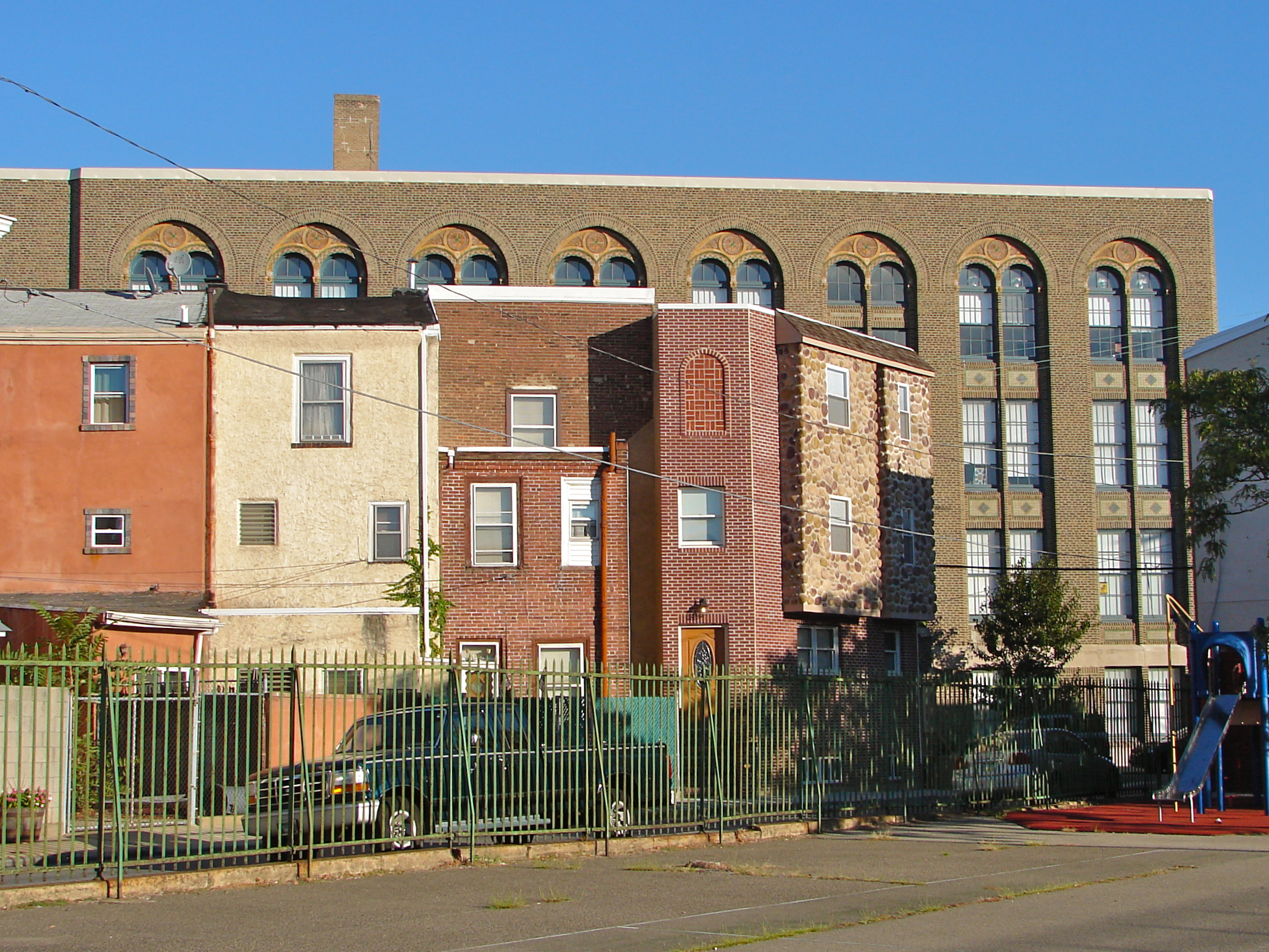
The Daniel Boone School at Hancock and Wildey

=== Primary and secondary schools ===
Northern Liberties residents are assigned to schools in the School District of Philadelphia.

Residents south of Poplar Street are zoned to the General Philip Kearny School for grades Kindergarten through 8.

Students zoned to Kearny are also zoned to Benjamin Franklin High School.

Residents north of Poplar Street are zoned to James R. Ludlow School for grades Kindergarten through 8 and Kensington High School for grades 9 through 12.

Other schools in Northern Liberties consist of:

- Laboratory Charter School (one campus)
- Walter D. Palmer Leadership Academy
- Bodine High School for International Affairs

=== Public libraries ===
Residents are served by the Ramonita de Rodriguez Branch of the Free Library of Philadelphia, which is located at 600 West Girard Avenue. The branch was known as the Girard Avenue Branch prior to the 1977 rename.

== Religious life ==
=== Churches and houses of worship ===
- Ukrainian Catholic Cathedral of the Immaculate Conception
- Immaculate Conception Catholic Church, Front and Allen Streets
- Seamens Church Institute, 475 N. 5th Street
- St. Andrew's Russian Orthodox Cathedral, 707 N 5th Street
- St. Peter's Catholic Church,/St. John Neumann Shrine 5th Street and Girard Avenue
- St. Michael's Russian Orthodox, 335 Fairmount Avenue
- Covenant House of God, 721 N 5th Street
- St. Agnes-St. John Slovak Catholic Church, 4th and Brown Streets
- Second Christian Missionary, 1150 N 4th Street
- Holy Trinity Romanian Orthodox Church, 723 N. Bodine Street

== Notable people ==
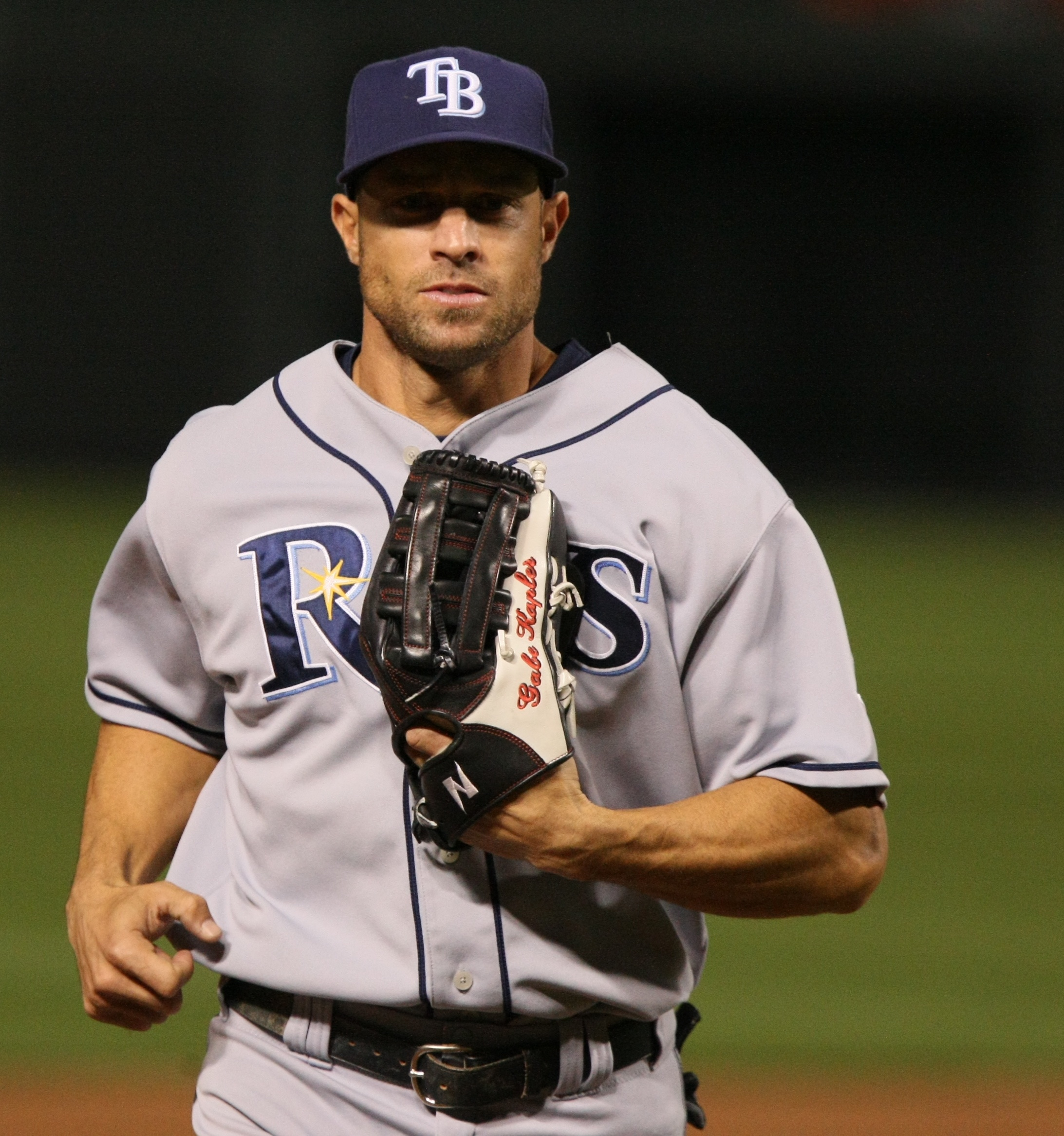
Gabe Kapler

- Jake Elliott (born 1995), American football kicker
- Daniel M. Fox (1819-1890), politician
- Gabe Kapler (born 1975), Major League Baseball outfielder and manager
- James Landy (1813–1875), politician
- John T. McIntyre (1871–1951), novelist
- William Millward (1822–1871), politician
- Albert F. Sabo (1920–2002), lawyer and judge
- Charles Yerkes (1837–1905), financier

== See also ==
- Edgar Allan Poe National Historic Site
