= Burk Brothers and Company =

- U.S. National Register of Historic Places
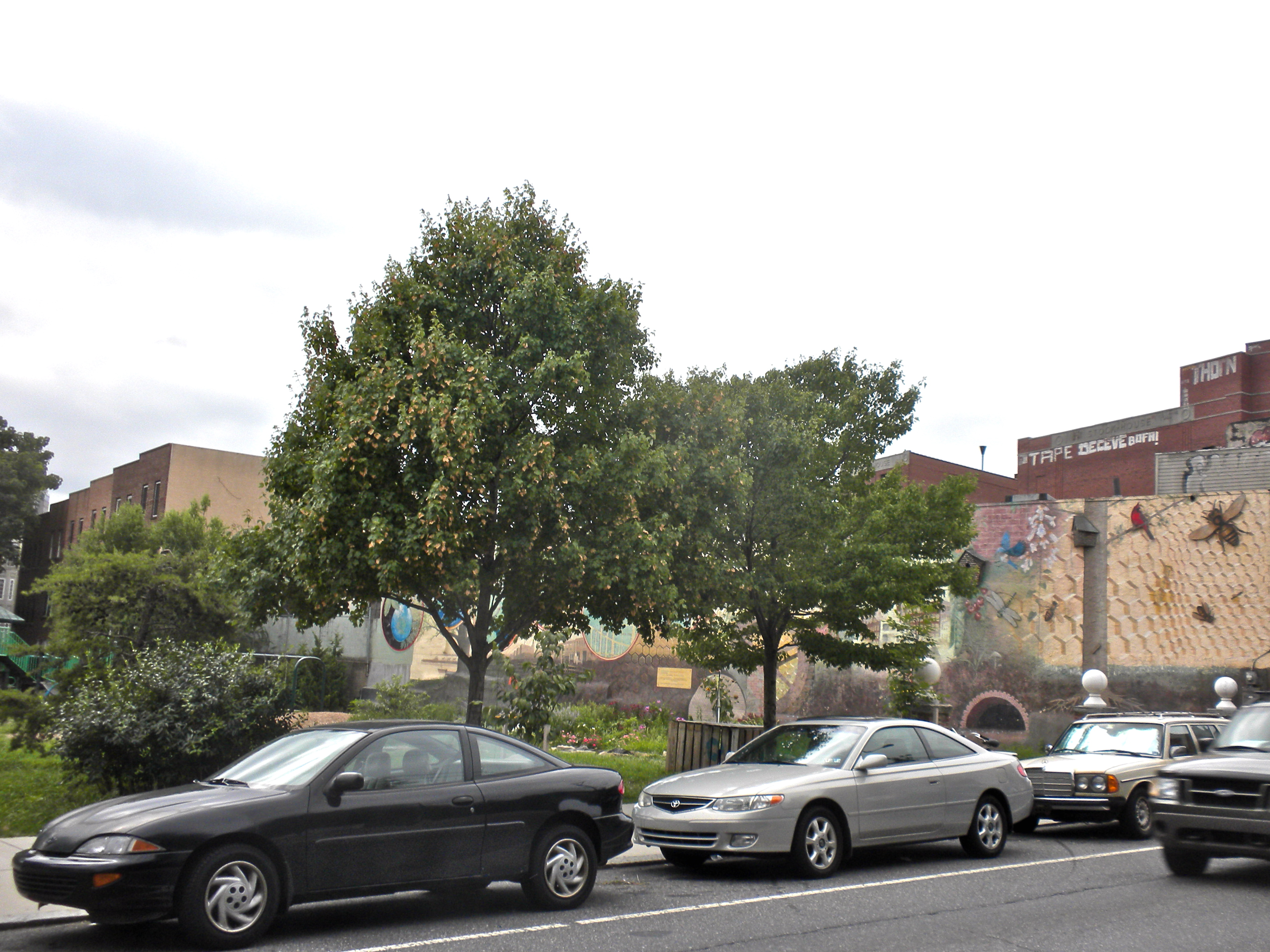
- Burk Brothers Site, August 2010

- Location within Philadelphia Location within Pennsylvania Location within the United States
- Location: 913-916 N. Third St., Philadelphia, Pennsylvania
- Coordinates: 39°57′57″N 75°8′34″W
- Area: 2 acres (0.81 ha)
- Built by: Fredericks, Geo.; Et al.
- NRHP reference No.: 85003493
- Added to NRHP: November 14, 1985

Burk Brothers and Company, also known as Diskmakers, was a historic factory complex located in the Northern Liberties neighborhood of Philadelphia, Pennsylvania. The complex consisted of 12 interconnected brick and reinforced concrete buildings, built between 1855 and 1913. The buildings were designed for the processing of kidskins into morocco or glazed kid leather.

It was added to the National Register of Historic Places in 1985. They have since been demolished.
