= National Register of Historic Places listings in North Philadelphia =

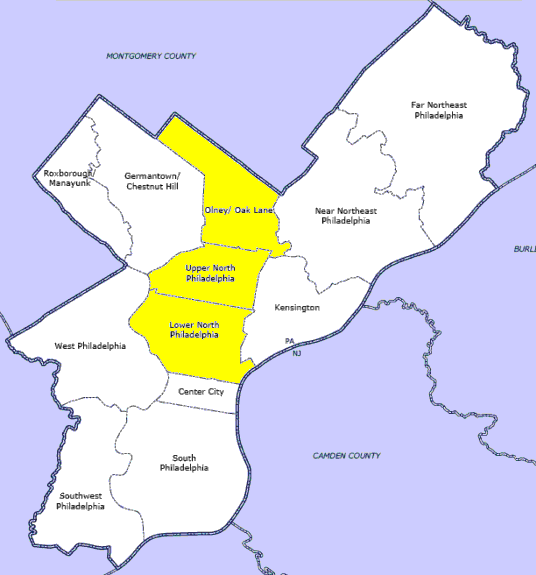
Location of North Philadelphia in Philadelphia

The following properties are listed on the National Register of Historic Places in North Philadelphia.

This is intended to be a complete list of the properties and districts on the National Register of Historic Places in North Philadelphia, Pennsylvania, United States. The locations of National Register properties and districts for which the latitude and longitude coordinates are included below, may be seen in an online map.

There are 621 properties and districts listed on the National Register of Historic Places in Philadelphia, including 67 National Historic Landmarks. North Philadelphia includes 173 of these properties and districts, of which 17 are National Historic Landmarks; the city's remaining properties and districts are listed elsewhere. Two sites are split between North Philadelphia and other parts of the city, and are thus included on multiple lists. Two other properties in North Philadelphia were once listed but have been removed.

== Current listings ==
	Name on the Register	Image	Date listed	Location	Neighborhood	Description
1	Adams Avenue Bridge in Philadelphia	Adams Avenue Bridge in Philadelphia	June 22, 1988 (#88000851)	Adams Avenue over Tacony Creek; 40°02′31″N 75°06′48″W	Olney	Extends into Northeast Philadelphia
2	William Adamson School	William Adamson School	November 18, 1988 (#88002224)	2637-2647 North 4th Street; 39°59′28″N 75°08′17″W	West Kensington	Built 1879-80, designed by Addison Hutton
3	Ajax Metal Company Plant	Ajax Metal Company Plant	July 30, 2014 (#14000470)	46 Richmond St. 39°57′59″N 75°08′10″W		
4	S.L. Allen & Company Building	S.L. Allen & Company Building	April 27, 2023 (#100008867)	459 West Glenwood Ave. 40°00′13″N 75°08′11″W		
5	American Railway Express Company Garage	American Railway Express Company Garage	August 2, 2006 (#06000664)	3002-3028 Cecil B. Moore Avenue; 39°59′02″N 75°11′03″W	Strawberry Mansion	
6	Alexander Dallas Bache School	Alexander Dallas Bache School	December 4, 1986 (#86003262)	801 North 22nd Street; 39°58′12″N 75°10′26″W	Fairmount	
7	Matthew Baird Mansion	Matthew Baird Mansion	December 29, 1983 (#83004241)	814 North Broad Street; 39°58′07″N 75°09′37″W	Francisville	(1863-64).
8	Clara Barton School	Clara Barton School	November 18, 1988 (#88002242)	300 East Wyoming Avenue; 40°01′13″N 75°07′10″W	North Hunting Park	
9	Bergdoll Mansion	Bergdoll Mansion	November 7, 1976 (#76001660)	2201-2205 Green Street; 39°57′56″N 75°10′28″W	Spring Garden	James H. Windrim, architect (1885-89).
10	Louis Bergdoll House	Louis Bergdoll House	January 3, 1985 (#85000038)	929 North 29th Street; 39°58′26″N 75°11′02″W	Brewerytown	Otto Charles Wolf, architect (1885).
11	Bethel Presbyterian Church		March 19, 2026 (#100012827)	1900 West York Street; 39°59′25″N 75°09′50″W		
12	Biberman Building	Biberman Building	September 14, 2007 (#07000951)	611-619 North 15th Street; 39°57′53″N 75°09′46″W	Spring Garden	
13	Gen. David B. Birney School	Gen. David B. Birney School	November 18, 1988 (#88002246)	900 West Lindley Street; 40°01′45″N 75°08′20″W	Logan	
14	Boat House Row	Boat House Row	February 27, 1987 (#87000821)	1-15 East River Drive; 39°58′14″N 75°11′14″W	Fairmount Park	
15	Daniel Boone School	Daniel Boone School	December 4, 1986 (#86003265)	Hancock and Wildey Streets; 39°58′03″N 75°08′14″W	Northern Liberties	
16	Brewerytown Historic District	Brewerytown Historic District	March 1, 1991 (#91000096)	Roughly bounded by 30th St., Girard Ave., 32nd St. and Glenwood Ave. 39°58′34″N 75°11′12″W	Brewerytown	
17	Edward G. Budd Manufacturing Company	Edward G. Budd Manufacturing Company	December 27, 2007 (#07001328)	2450 West Hunting Park Ave. 40°00′32″N 75°10′08″W	Hunting Park Industrial Area	
18	Buick Motor Company Building	Buick Motor Company Building	April 26, 2018 (#100002372)	2917-2937 N. 16 St. 39°59′54″N 75°09′25″W		
19	Burk Brothers and Company	Burk Brothers and Company	November 14, 1985 (#85003493)	913-916 North Third St. 39°57′54″N 75°08′31″W	Northern Liberties	
20	Callowhill Industrial Historic District	Callowhill Industrial Historic District	June 28, 2010 (#10000403)	Roughly bounded by Pearl St., North Broad St., Hamilton St., and the Reading Railroad Viaduct; 39°57′35″N 75°09′43″W	Callowhill	
21	Central High School	Central High School	December 4, 1986 (#86003267)	Olney and Ogontz Avenues; 40°02′14″N 75°08′58″W	Ogontz	Irwin T. Catharine, architect (1937-39).
22	George Chandler School	George Chandler School	November 18, 1988 (#88002255)	1050 East Montgomery St. 39°58′12″N 75°07′37″W	Fishtown	
23	Church of St. James the Less	Church of St. James the Less	November 20, 1974 (#74001801)	Hunting Park Ave. and Clearfield St. 40°00′13″N 75°10′57″W	Allegheny West	George Gordon Place & John E. Carver, architects (1846).
24	City Park Brewery	City Park Brewery	July 18, 1980 (#80003609)	Roughly bounded by Pennsylvania Ave., 28th, 30th, and Poplar Sts. 39°58′19″N 75°11′03″W	Fairmount	
25	Class and Nachod Brewery	Class and Nachod Brewery	July 31, 2003 (#03000724)	1801-1823 North 10th St. 39°58′47″N 75°09′01″W	Cecil B. Moore	
26	The Cliffs	The Cliffs	March 16, 1972 (#72001147)	East Fairmount Park near 33rd St. 39°58′46″N 75°11′39″W	Fairmount Park	
27	John Coltrane House	John Coltrane House	January 20, 1999 (#99000628)	1511 North 33rd St. 39°58′49″N 75°11′21″W	Strawberry Mansion	
28	Jay Cooke Junior High School	Jay Cooke Junior High School	November 18, 1988 (#88002259)	4735 Old York Road; 40°01′32″N 75°08′47″W	Logan	
29	Lydia Darrah School	Lydia Darrah School	December 4, 1986 (#86003269)	708-732 North 17th St. 39°58′05″N 75°09′58″W	Francisville	
30	De Long Hook & Eye Company Factory		July 16, 2026 (#100013220)	3031 N. 21st Street; 40°00′04″N 75°09′53″W		
31	Murrell Dobbins Vocational School	Murrell Dobbins Vocational School	November 18, 1988 (#88002263)	2100 Lehigh Ave. 39°59′43″N 75°10′02″W	South Lehigh	
32	Dobson Mills	Dobson Mills	July 28, 1988 (#88001214)	4001-4041 Ridge Ave.; 3502-3530 Scott's Lane; 40°00′28″N 75°11′14″W	Hunting Park Industrial Area	
33	Dropsie University Complex	Dropsie University Complex	January 17, 1975 (#75001661)	Broad and York Sts. 39°59′21″N 75°09′18″W	Cecil B. Moore	
34	Drueding Brothers Company Building	Drueding Brothers Company Building	December 12, 2012 (#12001043)	437-441 W. Master St. 39°58′22″N 75°08′39″W	Olde Kensington	
35	Paul Lawrence Dunbar School	Paul Lawrence Dunbar School	December 4, 1986 (#86003274)	Twelfth St. above Columbia Ave. 39°58′43″N 75°09′17″W	Cecil B. Moore	
36	Thomas Eakins House	Thomas Eakins House	October 15, 1966 (#66000679)	1729 Mount Vernon Place; 39°57′56″N 75°10′02″W	Spring Garden	
37	Eastern State Penitentiary	Eastern State Penitentiary	October 15, 1966 (#66000680)	21st St. and Fairmount Ave. 39°58′05″N 75°10′23″W	Fairmount	John Haviland, architect (1821-29).
38	James Elverson Jr. School	James Elverson Jr. School	November 18, 1988 (#88002231)	1300 Susquehanna Ave. 39°59′09″N 75°09′16″W	Cecil B. Moore	
39	The Elverson Building	The Elverson Building	July 15, 1996 (#96000716)	400-440 North Broad St. 39°57′36″N 75°09′44″W	Callowhill	Rankin, Kellogg & Crane, architects (1923-24).
40	Engine Company No. 29	Engine Company No. 29	May 6, 2022 (#100007674)	1221-1225 North 4th St. 39°58′15″N 75°08′34″W		
41	Fair Hill Burial Ground	Fair Hill Burial Ground	August 7, 1998 (#98000900)	Roughly along Germantown and Indiana Aves., 9th, and Cambria Sts. 39°59′49″N 75°08′46″W	Fairhill	
42	Fairmount Avenue Historic District	Fairmount Avenue Historic District	February 20, 2002 (#02000066)	Fairmount Ave. and Melon, North, 15th, 16th, and 17th Sts. 39°58′00″N 75°09′44″W	Spring Garden	
43	Fairmount Park	Fairmount Park	February 7, 1972 (#72001151)	Both banks of the Schuylkill River and Wissahickon Creek, from Spring Garden St. to Northwestern Ave. 39°58′58″N 75°11′50″W	Fairmount Park	Extends into Northwest and West Philadelphia
44	Fairmount Water Works	Fairmount Water Works	May 11, 1976 (#76001662)	Eastern banks of the Schuylkill River; 39°57′59″N 75°11′09″W	Fairmount Park	Frederick Graff, et al., architects (1812-22).
45	David Farragut School	David Farragut School	December 4, 1986 (#86003280)	Hancock and Cumberland Sts. 39°59′16″N 75°08′08″W	West Kensington	
46	Feltonville School No. 2	Feltonville School No. 2	November 18, 1988 (#88002269)	4901 Rising Sun Ave. 40°01′29″N 75°07′21″W	Feltonville	
47	Joseph C. Ferguson School	Joseph C. Ferguson School	November 18, 1988 (#88002270)	2000-2046 North 7th St. 39°58′55″N 75°08′48″W	Cecil B. Moore	
48	Fidelity Mutual Life Insurance Company Building	Fidelity Mutual Life Insurance Company Building	July 2, 1973 (#73001662)	Fairmount and Pennsylvania Aves. 39°58′03″N 75°10′47″W	Fairmount	Zantzinger, Borie and Medary, architects (1927).
49	Thomas K. Finletter School	Thomas K. Finletter School	November 18, 1988 (#88002271)	6101 North Front St. 40°02′37″N 75°07′10″W	Olney	
50	Thomas Fitzsimons Junior High School	Thomas Fitzsimons Junior High School	November 18, 1988 (#88002272)	2601 West Cumberland St. 39°59′38″N 75°10′30″W	Strawberry Mansion	
51	Helen Fleischer Vocational School	Helen Fleischer Vocational School	December 4, 1986 (#86003282)	13th and Brandywine Sts. 39°57′46″N 75°09′33″W	Callowhill	
52	Edwin Forrest House	Edwin Forrest House	January 13, 1972 (#72001152)	1346 North Broad St. 39°58′28″N 75°09′33″W	Cabot	Also listed as the Philadelphia School of Design for Women
53	Friends Housing Cooperative	Friends Housing Cooperative	October 13, 2015 (#15000735)	Bounded by Fairmount Ave., 8th, Franklin & Brown Sts. 39°57′54″N 75°09′03″W		
54	Founder's Hall, Girard College	Founder's Hall, Girard College	August 4, 1969 (#69000158)	Corinthian St. and Girard Ave. 39°58′26″N 75°10′12″W	Girard College	Thomas Ustick Walter, architect (1833-48).
55	Henry S. Frank Memorial Synagogue	Henry S. Frank Memorial Synagogue	July 12, 1983 (#83002267)	Old York and West Tabor Roads; 40°02′14″N 75°08′38″W	Logan	
56	Joe Frazier's Gym	Joe Frazier's Gym	April 30, 2013 (#13000257)	2917 N. Broad Street; 39°59′51″N 75°09′11″W	North Central	
57	General Electric Switchgear Plant	General Electric Switchgear Plant	October 31, 1985 (#85003470)	Seventh and Willow Sts. 39°57′32″N 75°09′00″W	Callowhill	
58	German Society of Pennsylvania	German Society of Pennsylvania	October 31, 1985 (#92000947)	611 Spring Garden St. 39°57′39″N 75°09′00″W	Northern Liberties	
59	Germantown Junction Station	Germantown Junction Station	July 8, 1999 (#92000940)	2900 North Broad St. 39°59′50″N 75°08′16″W	North Central	Theophilus P. Chandler Jr., architect (1896-1901).
60	Elizabeth Duane Gillespie Junior High School	Elizabeth Duane Gillespie Junior High School	April 10, 1989 (#88002275)	3901-3961 North 18th St. 40°00′48″N 75°09′22″W	Nicetown–Tioga	
61	Girard Avenue Historic District	Girard Avenue Historic District	October 31, 1985 (#85003427)	1415-2028 Girard Avenue and 1700 block of Thompson Street; 39°58′21″N 75°09′36″W	Cabot	
62	Girard Avenue West Historic District	Girard Avenue West Historic District	March 8, 2011 (#10001032)	West Girard Avenue, between North Taney and North 29th Streets; 39°58′28″N 75°10′52″W	Brewerytown	
63	Girard College Complex	Girard College Complex	October 29, 1974 (#74001802)	Bounded by Poplar St., Girard, West College, South College, and Ridge Aves. 39°58′25″N 75°09′22″W	Girard College	
64	Goodman Brothers and Hinlein Company	Goodman Brothers and Hinlein Company	March 7, 1985 (#85000469)	1238 Callowhill St. 39°57′33″N 75°09′35″W	Callowhill	
65	Gotham Silk Hosiery Company	Gotham Silk Hosiery Company	April 17, 2018 (#100002342)	2000-2034 N 2nd St. 39°58′51″N 75°08′14″W	West Kensington	
66	Graham and Laird, Schober and Mitchell Factories	Graham and Laird, Schober and Mitchell Factories	July 7, 1978 (#78002448)	19th St. between Hamilton and Buttonwood Sts. 39°57′44″N 75°10′11″W	Franklintown	Site now a parking lot.
67	Simon Gratz High School	Simon Gratz High School	April 10, 1989 (#88002276)	3901-3961 North 18th St. 40°00′50″N 75°09′21″W	Nicetown–Tioga	
68	Harrington Machine Shop	Harrington Machine Shop	May 6, 1983 (#83002270)	1640-1666 Callowhill St. 39°57′36″N 75°10′00″W	Franklintown	
69	William H. Harrison School	William H. Harrison School	November 18, 1988 (#88002278)	1012-1020 West Thompson St. 39°58′21″N 75°09′13″W	Yorktown	
70	Hatfield House	Hatfield House	March 16, 1972 (#72001157)	33rd St. near Girard Avenue; 39°58′33″N 75°11′18″W	Fairmount Park	
71	Houses at 1907–1951 N. 32nd St.	Houses at 1907–1951 N. 32nd St.	January 11, 1994 (#93001472)	1907–1951 North 32nd St. 39°59′10″N 75°11′09″W	Strawberry Mansion	
72	Julia Ward Howe School	Julia Ward Howe School	November 18, 1988 (#88002284)	1301-1331 Grange St. 40°02′29″N 75°08′32″W	Fern Rock	
73	Integrity Title Insurance, Trust and Safe Deposit Company	Integrity Title Insurance, Trust and Safe Deposit Company	November 14, 1982 (#82001548)	4th and Green Sts. 39°57′42″N 75°08′42″W	Northern Liberties	
74	International Harvester Company Building-Philadelphia Branch House	International Harvester Company Building-Philadelphia Branch House	April 26, 2018 (#100002370)	2903-2909 N. 16th St. 39°59′52″N 75°09′25″W		
75	Interstate Storage Warehouse	Interstate Storage Warehouse	April 21, 2025 (#100011702)	3935-61 Germantown Avenue; 40°00′50″N 75°09′10″W		
76	Thomas Jefferson School	Thomas Jefferson School	November 18, 1988 (#88002280)	1101-1125 North 4th St. 39°58′05″N 75°08′36″W	Northern Liberties	
77	Harry C. Kahn and Son Warehouse	Harry C. Kahn and Son Warehouse	April 10, 2017 (#100000857)	3101-27 W. Glenwood Ave. 39°58′50″N 75°11′10″W		
78	Kensington Branch of the Philadelphia YWCA	Kensington Branch of the Philadelphia YWCA	March 9, 1990 (#90000415)	174 West Allegheny Ave. 39°59′56″N 75°07′57″W	West Kensington	
79	John L. Kinsey School	John L. Kinsey School	December 4, 1986 (#86003297)	65th Ave. and Limekiln Pike; 40°03′13″N 75°09′09″W	West Oak Lane	
80	Laurel Hill Cemetery	Laurel Hill Cemetery	October 28, 1977 (#77001185)	3822 Ridge Ave. 40°00′15″N 75°11′19″W	Fairmount Park	
81	Logan Demonstration School	Logan Demonstration School	November 18, 1988 (#88002293)	5000 North 17th St. 40°01′52″N 75°09′06″W	Logan	
82	Lorraine Apartments	Lorraine Apartments	November 27, 2002 (#02001427)	699 North Broad St. 39°58′00″N 75°09′37″W	Poplar	Willis G. Hale, architect (1892-1893).
83	James Russell Lowell School	James Russell Lowell School	November 18, 1988 (#88002295)	5801-5851 North 5th St. 40°02′27″N 75°07′44″W	Olney	
84	Lower North Philadelphia Speculative Housing Historic District	Lower North Philadelphia Speculative Housing Historic District	March 12, 1999 (#99000325)	Roughly bounded by North 15th St., Sydenham St., North 16th St., Montgomery Ave., North 19th St., Jefferson St., and Willington St. 39°58′47″N 75°09′41″W	North Central	
85	James R. Ludlow School	James R. Ludlow School	November 18, 1988 (#88002296)	1323-1345 North 6th St. 39°58′21″N 75°08′45″W	Yorktown	
86	Martin Orthopedic School	Martin Orthopedic School	December 4, 1986 (#86003300)	800 North 22nd St. 39°58′12″N 75°10′27″W	Fairmount	
87	Alexander K. McClure School	Alexander K. McClure School	November 18, 1988 (#88002300)	4139 North 6th St. 40°00′54″N 75°08′15″W	Hunting Park	
88	McDowell Memorial Presbyterian Church	McDowell Memorial Presbyterian Church	September 18, 2013 (#13000744)	2040 Cecil B. Moore Avenue; 39°58′48″N 75°10′09″W	North Central	
89	George Meade School	George Meade School	December 4, 1986 (#86003305)	1801 Oxford St. 39°58′42″N 75°09′54″W	North Central	
90	A. Mecky Company Building	A. Mecky Company Building	May 8, 2017 (#100000977)	1705 W. Allegheny Ave. 40°00′08″N 75°09′29″W		
91	Metropolitan Opera House	Metropolitan Opera House	February 1, 1972 (#72001163)	858 North Broad St. 39°58′12″N 75°09′36″W	Francisville	
92	Middishade Clothing Factory	Middishade Clothing Factory	January 6, 1987 (#86003579)	1600 Callowhill St. 39°57′36″N 75°09′55″W	Franklintown	
93	Mifflin School	Mifflin School	December 4, 1986 (#86003308)	808-818 North 3rd St. 39°57′49″N 75°08′35″W	Northern Liberties	
94	Andrew J. Morrison School	Andrew J. Morrison School	November 18, 1988 (#88002302)	300 Duncannon St. 40°01′46″N 75°07′46″W	Olney	
95	Most Precious Blood Roman Catholic Church, Rectory and Parochial School	Most Precious Blood Roman Catholic Church, Rectory and Parochial School	January 22, 1992 (#91002008)	2800-2818 Diamond St. 39°59′14″N 75°10′47″W	Strawberry Mansion	Demolished in 2023
96	Mount Pleasant	Mount Pleasant	October 15, 1966 (#66000685)	East Reservoir Drive; 39°59′00″N 75°12′00″W	Fairmount Park	
97	Muhlenberg School	Muhlenberg School	November 18, 1988 (#88002247)	1640 Master St. 39°58′30″N 75°09′49″W	Cabot	
98	Simon Muhr Work Training School	Simon Muhr Work Training School	December 1, 1986 (#86003310)	12th St. and Allegheny Ave. 40°00′03″N 75°08′55″W	Nicetown–Tioga	
99	Mulford Building	Mulford Building	August 20, 2004 (#04000882)	640 North Broad St. 39°57′54″N 75°09′40″W	Spring Garden	
100	N. Snellenburg Company Department Store Warehouse	N. Snellenburg Company Department Store Warehouse	July 31, 2003 (#03000725)	1825-1851 North 10th St. 39°58′49″N 75°09′00″W	Cecil B. Moore	
101	National Bank of North Philadelphia	National Bank of North Philadelphia	May 20, 1985 (#85001131)	3701 North Broad St. 40°00′36″N 75°09′03″W	Nicetown–Tioga	
102	North Broad Street Mansion District	North Broad Street Mansion District	March 29, 1985 (#85000674)	Roughly bounded by Broad, Jefferson, Willington, and Oxford Sts. 39°58′37″N 75°09′38″W	Cecil B. Moore	
103	North Broad Street Station, Reading Company	North Broad Street Station, Reading Company	March 28, 1996 (#96000325)	2601 North Broad St. 39°59′33″N 75°09′16″W	Cecil B. Moore	
104	Northeast Manual Training School	Northeast Manual Training School	December 4, 1986 (#86003279)	701 Lehigh Ave. 39°59′35″N 75°08′40″W	Fairhill	Burned then demolished in 2011.
105	Northern Liberties Historic District	Northern Liberties Historic District	October 31, 1985 (#85003471)	Roughly bounded by Brown, Boone and Galloway, Green and Wallace, and 5th and 6th Sts. 39°57′57″N 75°08′48″W	Northern Liberties	
106	Northern National Bank	Northern National Bank	June 27, 1985 (#85001388)	2300 Germantown Ave. 39°59′12″N 75°08′43″W	Hartranft	
107	Northern Saving Fund and Safe Deposit Company	Northern Saving Fund and Safe Deposit Company	September 28, 1977 (#77001187)	600 Spring Garden St. 39°57′40″N 75°08′55″W	Callowhill	
108	Ogontz Hall	Ogontz Hall	November 14, 1991 (#91001708)	7175-7165 Ogontz Ave. 40°03′51″N 75°09′09″W	West Oak Lane	
109	Olney Elementary School	Olney Elementary School	December 4, 1986 (#86003311)	Tabor Road and Water St. 40°01′52″N 75°07′14″W	Olney	
110	Olney High School	Olney High School	December 4, 1986 (#86003312)	Duncannon and Front Sts. 40°01′44″N 75°07′25″W	Olney	
111	Henry F. Ortlieb Company Bottling House	Henry F. Ortlieb Company Bottling House	August 5, 2014 (#14000475)	829-51 N. American St. 39°57′49″N 75°08′30″W		
112	Park Towne Place	Park Towne Place	December 15, 2011 (#11000926)	2200 Park Towne Place; 39°57′40″N 75°10′39″W	Logan Square	
113	Charles Willson Peale House	Charles Willson Peale House	October 15, 1966 (#66000687)	2100 Clarkson Ave. 40°02′17″N 75°09′20″W	Logan	
114	William Penn High School for Girls	William Penn High School for Girls	December 1, 1986 (#86003316)	1501 Wallace St. 39°57′54″N 75°09′47″W	Spring Garden	
115	Joseph Pennell School	Joseph Pennell School	November 18, 1988 (#88002309)	1800-1856 Nedro Ave. 40°02′37″N 75°09′03″W	Belfield	
116	Pennsylvania State Office Building	Pennsylvania State Office Building	January 7, 2010 (#09001216)	1400 Spring Garden St. 39°57′43″N 75°09′44″W	Hahnemann	
117	Samuel W. Pennypacker School	Samuel W. Pennypacker School	November 18, 1988 (#88002314)	1800-1850 East Washington Lane; 40°03′55″N 75°09′32″W	West Oak Lane	
118	Philadelphia High School for Girls	Philadelphia High School for Girls	December 4, 1986 (#86003302)	17th and Spring Garden Sts. 39°57′48″N 75°09′57″W	Spring Garden	
119	Philadelphia National Cemetery	Philadelphia National Cemetery	July 24, 1997 (#97000775)	Haines St. and Limekiln Road; 40°03′31″N 75°09′18″W	West Oak Lane	
120	Philadelphia School of Design for Women	Philadelphia School of Design for Women	November 4, 1993 (#93001608)	1346 North Broad St. 39°58′28″N 75°09′33″W	Cabot	Also listed as the Edwin Forrest House. The school merged into the Moore College of Art and Design.
121	Philadelphia Wholesale Drug Company Building	Philadelphia Wholesale Drug Company Building	September 5, 1990 (#90001410)	513-525 North Tenth St. 39°57′41″N 75°09′21″W	Callowhill	
122	Plaza Apartments	Plaza Apartments	February 15, 2005 (#05000063)	1719-1725 North 33rd St., 3226-3228 Clifford St. 39°58′59″N 75°11′18″W	Strawberry Mansion	
123	Edgar Allan Poe House, National Historic Site	Edgar Allan Poe House, National Historic Site	October 15, 1966 (#66000689)	530-532 North Seventh St. 39°57′43″N 75°09′00″W	Callowhill	
124	Pringle Electrical Manufacturing Company Building	Pringle Electrical Manufacturing Company Building	February 12, 2024 (#100009918)	1906-12 N. 6th Street; 39°58′49″N 75°08′41″W		
125	Progress Lighting Manufacturing Company	Progress Lighting Manufacturing Company	August 29, 2016 (#16000572)	1401-1409 Germantown Ave. 39°58′22″N 75°08′29″W		
126	Quaker City Dye Works	Quaker City Dye Works	December 12, 2012 (#12001044)	100-118 W. Oxford St. 39°58′26″N 75°08′06″W	West Kensington	
127	Randolph House	Randolph House	March 24, 1972 (#72001169)	Edgeley Drive; 39°59′29″N 75°11′42″W	Fairmount Park	
128	Reading Company Grain Elevator	Reading Company Grain Elevator	March 10, 1982 (#82003813)	411 North 20th St. 39°57′41″N 75°10′16″W	Logan Square	
129	Reyburn Manufacturing Company Building	Reyburn Manufacturing Company Building	June 10, 2022 (#100007771)	3111 West Allegheny Ave. 40°00′19″N 75°10′52″W		
130	Gen. John F. Reynolds School	Gen. John F. Reynolds School	November 18, 1988 (#88002315)	2300 Jefferson St. 39°58′41″N 75°10′29″W	North Central	
131	Ridge Avenue Farmers' Market	Ridge Avenue Farmers' Market	March 5, 1984 (#84003547)	1810 Ridge Ave. 39°58′19″N 75°09′59″W	Francisville	
132	Rodeph Shalom Synagogue	Rodeph Shalom Synagogue	August 7, 2007 (#07000797)	607-615 North Broad St. 39°57′50″N 75°09′39″W	Poplar	
133	William Rowen School	William Rowen School	November 18, 1988 (#88002318)	6801 North 19th St. 40°03′31″N 75°08′55″W	West Oak Lane	
134	St. John's Church	St. John's Church	February 24, 1983 (#83002278)	220-230 Brown St. 39°57′47″N 75°08′32″W	Northern Liberties	
135	St. Joseph's House for Homeless Industrious Boys	St. Joseph's House for Homeless Industrious Boys	October 24, 1996 (#96001204)	1511 and 1515-1527 Allegheny Ave. 40°00′08″N 75°09′20″W	Nicetown–Tioga	
136	Frank C. Scherer Wagon Works	Frank C. Scherer Wagon Works	December 26, 1985 (#85003160)	801 North 27th St. 39°58′14″N 75°10′52″W	Fairmount	
137	Edwin J. Schoettle Company Building	Edwin J. Schoettle Company Building	December 29, 2014 (#14001105)	533 North 11th St. 39°57′45″N 75°09′21″W	Poplar	
138	Smaltz Building	Smaltz Building	July 27, 2005 (#05000759)	315 North 12th St. 39°57′30″N 75°09′29″W	Callowhill	
139	Snellenburg's Clothing Factory	Snellenburg's Clothing Factory	September 2, 1986 (#86001842)	642 North Broad St. 39°57′56″N 75°09′40″W	Spring Garden	
140	George W. South Memorial Protestant Episcopal Church of the Advocate	George W. South Memorial Protestant Episcopal Church of the Advocate	February 8, 1980 (#80003620)	18th and Diamond Sts. 39°59′09″N 75°09′49″W	North Central	Charles Marquedant Burns, architect (1887-97).
141	Special Troops Armory	Special Troops Armory	November 14, 1991 (#91001702)	5350 Ogontz Ave. 40°02′07″N 75°09′03″W	Ogontz	
142	Spring Garden District	Spring Garden District	December 21, 1978 (#78002455)	Roughly bounded by Fairmount Ave. and 15th, 24th, Mount Vernon, and Spring Garden Sts.; also Fairmount Ave. and Mt. Vernon, 15th, and 19th Sts. 39°57′58″N 75°10′11″W	Spring Garden	Second set of boundaries represents a boundary increase of September 12, 1983
143	Spring Garden School No. 1	Spring Garden School No. 1	December 4, 1986 (#86003332)	12th and Ogden Sts. 39°58′07″N 75°09′21″W	Poplar	
144	Spring Garden School No. 2	Spring Garden School No. 2	December 4, 1986 (#86003333)	12th and Melon Sts. 39°57′54″N 75°09′22″W	Poplar	
145	M. Hall Stanton Public School	M. Hall Stanton Public School	September 25, 2018 (#100002987)	2539 N 16th St. 39°59′31″N 75°09′30″W		
146	Steel Heddle Manufacturing Company Complex	Steel Heddle Manufacturing Company Complex	June 28, 2010 (#10000404)	2100 West Allegheny Ave. 40°00′10″N 75°09′54″W	Allegheny West	
147	Stenton	Stenton	October 15, 1966 (#66000690)	18th and Courtland Streets; 40°01′29″N 75°09′13″W	Logan	
148	Thaddeus Stevens School of Observation	Thaddeus Stevens School of Observation	December 4, 1986 (#86003335)	1301 Spring Garden St. 39°57′45″N 75°09′37″W	Poplar	
149	Strawbridge and Clothier Department Store Warehouse	Strawbridge and Clothier Department Store Warehouse	November 20, 2018 (#100003137)	901 Poplar St. 39°58′06″N 75°09′06″W		
150	Suffolk Manor Apartments	Suffolk Manor Apartments	December 20, 2002 (#02001567)	1414-1450 Clearview St. 40°02′26″N 75°08′45″W	Ogontz	
151	Sykes Brothers Yarn Mill	Sykes Brothers Yarn Mill	November 26, 2019 (#100004701)	178-180 W. Huntingdon St. 39°59′23″N 75°08′03″W	West Kensington	
152	Henry O. Tanner House	Henry O. Tanner House	May 11, 1976 (#76001672)	2908 West Diamond St. 39°59′16″N 75°10′52″W	Strawberry Mansion	
153	Tasty Baking Company Building	Tasty Baking Company Building	September 8, 2011 (#11000648)	2801 West Hunting Park Avenue; 40°00′25″N 75°10′31″W	Hunting Park Industrial Area	
154	Bayard Taylor School	Bayard Taylor School	November 18, 1988 (#88002329)	3614-3630 North Randolph St. 40°00′26″N 75°08′18″W	Hunting Park	
155	Terminal Commerce Building	Terminal Commerce Building	October 24, 1996 (#96001203)	401 North Broad St. 39°57′36″N 75°09′41″W	Callowhill	
156	Thirty-third Street Bridge in Philadelphia	Thirty-third Street Bridge in Philadelphia	June 22, 1988 (#88000847)	33rd St. above Master St. 39°58′43″N 75°11′23″W	Brewerytown	
157	Union Methodist Episcopal Church	Union Methodist Episcopal Church	October 15, 1980 (#80003622)	2019 West Diamond St. 39°59′11″N 75°10′01″W	North Central	
158	Uptown Theater and Office Building	Uptown Theater and Office Building	July 22, 1982 (#82003817)	2240-2248 North Broad St. 39°59′15″N 75°09′22″W	Cecil B. Moore	Magaziner, Eberhard & Harris, architects (1929).
159	Roberts Vaux Junior High School	Roberts Vaux Junior High School	November 18, 1988 (#88002332)	2300-2344 West Master St. 39°58′35″N 75°10′27″W	North Central	
160	Wagner Free Institute of Science	Wagner Free Institute of Science	May 17, 1989 (#89000361)	17th St. and Montgomery Ave. 39°58′50″N 75°09′46″W	North Central	John McArthur Jr., architect (1859-65).
161	Gen. Louis Wagner Junior High School	Gen. Louis Wagner Junior High School	December 4, 1986 (#86003340)	17th St. and Chelten Ave. 40°03′06″N 75°08′52″W	West Oak Lane	
162	Rudolph Walton School	Rudolph Walton School	December 4, 1986 (#86003341)	2601-2631 North 28th St. 39°59′43″N 75°10′36″W	Strawberry Mansion	
163	West Diamond Street Townhouse Historic District	West Diamond Street Townhouse Historic District	February 21, 1991 (#91000097)	3008-3146, 3011-3215 Diamond St. 39°59′18″N 75°11′02″W	Strawberry Mansion	
164	John Greenleaf Whittier School	John Greenleaf Whittier School	November 18, 1988 (#88002334)	2600 Clearfield St. 40°00′09″N 75°10′26″W	Allegheny West	
165	Willow Steam Plant	Willow Steam Plant	January 10, 2025 (#100011244)	411-419 N. 9th Street; 39°57′33″N 75°09′12″W		
166	Wills Hospital	Wills Hospital	July 12, 1984 (#84003582)	1601 Spring Garden St. 39°57′48″N 75°09′54″W	Spring Garden	John T. Windrim, architect (1931-32).
167	Mary Channing Wister School	Mary Channing Wister School	November 18, 1988 (#88002333)	843-855 North 8th St. 39°58′01″N 75°09′02″W	Poplar	
168	Woodford	Woodford	December 24, 1967 (#67000021)	Dauphin and 33rd Sts. 39°59′33″N 75°11′18″W	Fairmount Park	
169	E.A. Wright Bank Note Company Building	E.A. Wright Bank Note Company Building	June 13, 2022 (#100007788)	2527-2537 North Broad St. 39°59′31″N 75°09′17″W		
170	Richardson L. Wright School	Richardson L. Wright School	December 4, 1986 (#86003348)	1101 Venango St. 40°00′25″N 75°08′46″W	Nicetown–Tioga	Lloyd Titus, architect. Built 1905. Destroyed before 2008.
171	Wyoming Central Office of the Bell Telephone Company	Wyoming Central Office of the Bell Telephone Company	May 11, 2015 (#15000219)	4900 N. Broad St. 40°01′40″N 75°08′51″W	Wyoming	
172	Yorktown Historic District	Yorktown Historic District	December 12, 2012 (#12001046)	Roughly bounded by Cecil B. Moore Ave., N. 10th, W. Oxford, N. 11th, W. Stiles, W. Flora, & N. 13th St. 39°58′31″N 75°09′13″W	Ludlow	Low rise, urban redevelopment 1959-69
173	Zion Baptist Church and Educational Annex	Zion Baptist Church and Educational Annex	February 27, 2023 (#100008647)	3600 and 3601-07 North Broad St. 40°00′28″N 75°09′06″W		

== Former listings ==
	Name on the Register	Image	Date listed	Date removed	Location	Neighborhood	Description
1	Odd Fellow's Hall		June 19, 1973 (#78003440)	February 14, 1978	800 N. 3rd Street	Poplar	
2	William J. Stokely School		December 4, 1986 (#86003336)	April 1, 2009	1852 North 32nd Street; 39°59′07″N 75°11′11″W	Strawberry Mansion	Also known as the Prince of Peace Baptist Church. Destroyed by fire on April 30, 2008.
3	P.A.B. Widener Mansion	P.A.B. Widener Mansion	November 20, 1979 (#79002332)	June 27, 1986	1200 North Broad Street; 39°58′20″N 75°09′33″W	Yorktown	Willis G. Hale, architect. Destroyed by fire on July 28, 1980.

== See also ==
- List of National Historic Landmarks in Philadelphia
- National Register of Historic Places listings in Philadelphia, Pennsylvania
