= Allegheny West =

Allegheny West is the name of two places in the United States:

- Allegheny West, Philadelphia, a neighborhood in Philadelphia, Pennsylvania
- Allegheny West (Pittsburgh), a neighborhood in Pittsburgh, Pennsylvania
