= Xmas =

Common abbreviation of the word "Christmas"

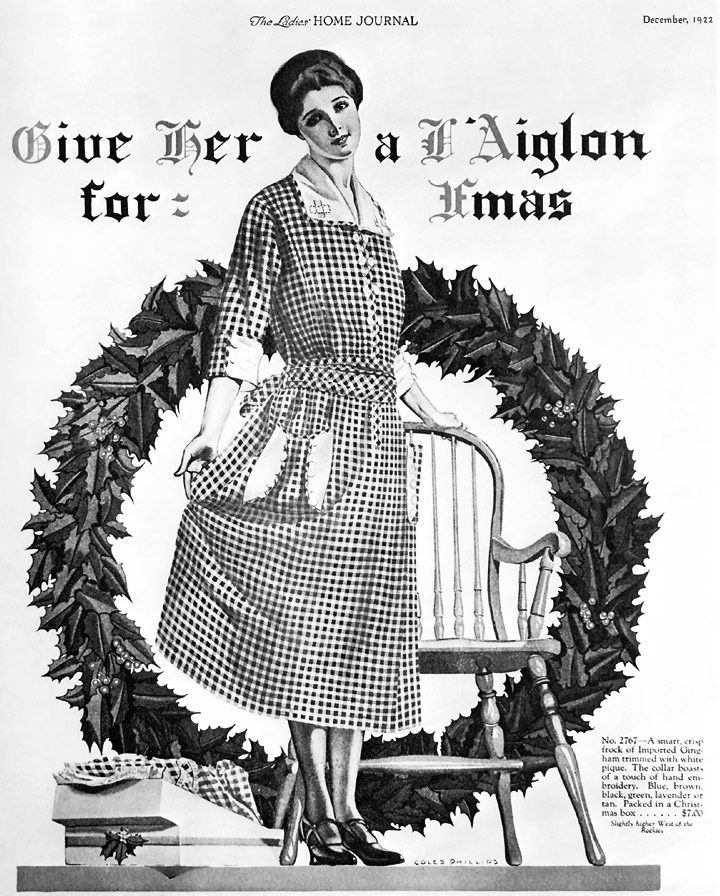
A 1922 advertisement in Ladies' Home Journal for Biberman Bros.: "Give her a L'Aiglon for Xmas"

Xmas (also X-mas) is a common abbreviation of the word Christmas. It is sometimes pronounced /ˈɛksməs/, but Xmas, and variants such as Xtemass, originated as handwriting abbreviations for the typical pronunciation /ˈkrɪsməs/. The 'X' comes from the Greek letter Chi, which is the first letter of the Greek word Christós (Ancient Greek: Χριστός, romanized: Khristós, lit. 'anointed, covered in oil'), which became Christ in English. The suffix -mas is from the Latin-derived Old English word for Mass.

There is a common misconception that the word Xmas stems from a secularizing tendency to de-emphasize the religious tradition of Christmas, by taking the 'Christ' out of "Christmas". In actuality, the term's usage dates back to the 16th century, and corresponds to Roman Catholic, Eastern Orthodox, Lutheran and Anglican liturgical use of various forms of chi-rho monogram. In English, "X" was first used as a scribal abbreviation for "Christ" in 1100; "X'temmas" is attested in 1551, and "Xmas" in 1721.

== Style guides and etiquette ==
The term Xmas is deprecated by some modern style guides, including those at The New York Times, The New York Times Manual of Style and Usage, The Times, The Guardian, and the BBC. Millicent Fenwick, in the 1948 Vogue's Book of Etiquette, states that Xmas "should never be used" in greeting cards. The Cambridge Guide to Australian English Usage states that the spelling should be considered informal and restricted to contexts where concision is valued, such as headlines and greeting cards. The Christian Writer's Manual of Style, while acknowledging the ancient and respectful use of Xmas in the past, states that the spelling should never be used in formal writing.

== History ==
=== Use in English ===
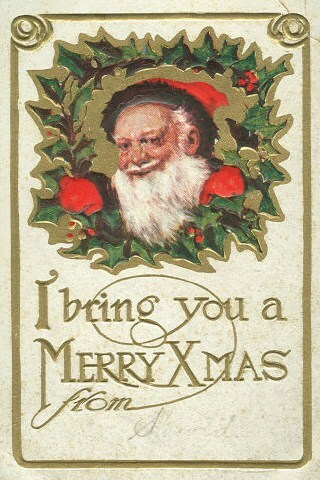
"Xmas" used on a Christmas postcard, 1910

Early use of Xmas includes Bernard Ward's History of St. Edmund's college, Old Hall (originally published c. 1755). An earlier version, X'temmas, dates to 1551. Around 1100 the term was written as Xp̄es mæsse in the Anglo-Saxon Chronicle. Xmas is found in a letter from George Woodward in 1753. Lord Byron used the term in 1811, as did Samuel Coleridge (1801) and Lewis Carroll (1864). In the United States, the fifth American edition of William Perry's Royal Standard English Dictionary, published in Boston in 1800, included in its list of "Explanations of Common Abbreviations, or Contraction of Words" the entry: "Xmas. Christmas." Oliver Wendell Holmes Jr. used the term in a letter dated 1923.

Since at least the late 19th century, Xmas has been in use in various other English-language nations. Quotations with the word can be found in texts first written in Canada, and the word has been used in Australia, and in the Caribbean. Merriam-Webster's Dictionary of English Usage stated that modern use of the term is largely limited to advertisements, headlines and banners, where its conciseness is valued. The association with commerce "has done nothing for its reputation", according to the dictionary.

In the United Kingdom, the former Church of England Bishop of Blackburn, Alan Chesters, recommended to his clergy that they avoid the spelling. In the United States, in 1977 New Hampshire Governor Meldrim Thomson sent out a press release saying that he wanted journalists to keep the "Christ" in Christmas, and not call it Xmas—which he called a "pagan" spelling of 'Christmas'.

=== Use of X for 'Christ' ===
The Chi-Rho is a Christian symbol representing Christ.

The abbreviation of Christmas as Xmas is a source of disagreement among Christians who observe the holiday.

The December 1957 News and Views published by the Church League of America, a conservative organization co-founded in 1937 by George Washington Robnett, attacked the use of Xmas in an article titled "X=The Unknown Quantity". The claims were picked up later by Gerald L. K. Smith, who in December 1966 claimed that Xmas was a "blasphemous omission of the name of Christ" and that "'X' is referred to as being symbolical of the unknown quantity". Smith further argued that the Jewish people had introduced Santa Claus to suppress New Testament accounts of Jesus, and that the United Nations, at the behest of "world Jewry", had "outlawed the name of Christ". There is, however, a well documented history of use of Χ (actually the Greek letter chi) as an abbreviation for "Christ" (Χριστός) and possibly also a symbol of the cross. The abbreviation appears on many Orthodox Christian religious icons.

Dennis Bratcher, writing for Christian website The Voice, states "there are always those who loudly decry the use of the abbreviation 'Xmas' as some kind of blasphemy against Christ and Christianity". Among them are evangelist Franklin Graham and former CNN contributor Roland S. Martin. Graham stated in an interview:

[F]or us as Christians, this is one of the most holy of the holidays, the birth of our savior Jesus Christ. And for people to take Christ out of Christmas. They're happy to say merry Xmas. Let's just take Jesus out. And really, I think, a war against the name of Jesus Christ.

Roland Martin likewise relates the use of Xmas to his growing concerns of increasing commercialization and secularization of one of Christianity's highest holy days. Bratcher posits that those who dislike abbreviating the word are unfamiliar with a long history of Christians using X in place of "Christ" for various purposes.

The word Christ and its compounds, including Christmas, have been abbreviated in English for at least the past 1,000 years, long before the modern Xmas was commonly used. Christ was often written as 'Xρ' or 'Xt'; there are references in the Anglo-Saxon Chronicle as far back as 1021. This 'X' and 'P' arose as the uppercase forms of the Greek letters χ (Ch) and ρ (R) used in ancient abbreviations for Χριστος (Greek for "Christ"). The Chi-Rho, an amalgamation of the two Greek letters rendered as '☧' (Unicode character U+2627 ☧ CHI RHO) is a symbol often used to represent Christ in Catholic, Protestant, and Orthodox Christian Churches.

The Oxford English Dictionary (OED) and the OED Supplement have cited usages of X- or Xp- for 'Christ-' as early as 1485. The terms Xtian and less commonly Xpian have also been used for 'Christian'. The OED further cites usage of Xtianity for 'Christianity' from 1634. According to Merriam-Webster's Dictionary of English Usage, most of the evidence for these words comes from "educated Englishmen who knew their Greek".

In ancient Christian art, χ and χρ are abbreviations for Christ's name. In many manuscripts of the New Testament and icons, 'Χ' is an abbreviation for Χριστος, as is XC (the first and last letters in Greek, using the lunate sigma); compare IC for Jesus in Greek.

==== Other uses of X(t) for 'Chris(t)-' ====
Other proper names containing the name 'Christ' besides those mentioned above are sometimes abbreviated similarly, either as X or Xt, both of which have been used historically, e.g., Xtopher or Xopher for 'Christopher', or Xtina or Xina for the name 'Christina'.

In the 17th and 18th centuries, Xene and Exene were common spellings for the given name 'Christine'. The American singer Christina Aguilera has sometimes gone by the name "Xtina". Similarly, Exene Cervenka has been a noted American singer-songwriter since 1977.

This usage of 'X' to spell the syllable kris (rather than the sounds ks) has extended to xtal for 'crystal', and on florists' signs to xant for 'chrysanthemum', even though these words are not etymologically related to Christ: crystal comes from a Greek word meaning 'ice' (and not even using the letter χ), and chrysanthemum comes from Greek words meaning 'golden flower', while Christ comes from a Greek word meaning 'anointed'.

== See also ==
- Christogram
- Christmas controversies
- Labarum
- Names and titles of Jesus
- Xtal in science, an abbreviation for crystal
