= Class and Nachod Brewery =

- U.S. National Register of Historic Places
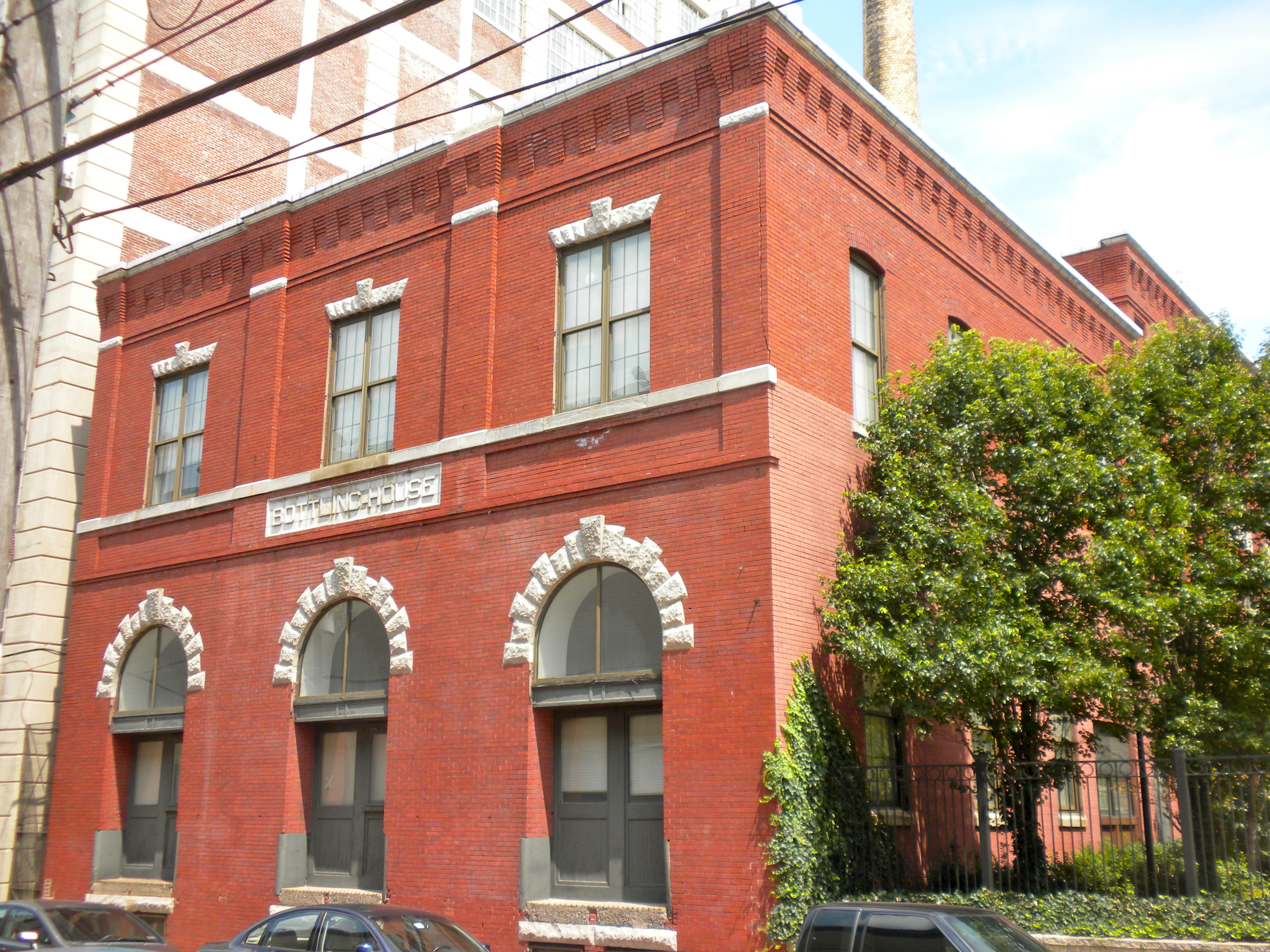

- Location within Philadelphia Location within Pennsylvania Location within the United States
- Location: 1801-1823 North 10th Street, Philadelphia, Pennsylvania
- Coordinates: 39°58′47″N 75°9′1″W
- Area: 1 acre (0.40 ha)
- Built: 1911
- Architect: Caspar, Charles H.
- Architectural style: Beaux Arts
- NRHP reference No.: 03000724
- Added to NRHP: July 31, 2003

The Class and Nachod Brewery, is located in Philadelphia, Pennsylvania. The building was built in 1911, and is composed of six interconnected sections that historically served as the Brewery, Cooper Shop, Engine Room, Boiler House, Stable and Garage, and Bottling House.

It was added to the National Register of Historic Places on July 31, 2003.

== See also ==
- National Register of Historic Places listings in North Philadelphia
- List of defunct breweries in the United States
