= Henry O. Tanner House =

Historic house in Pennsylvania, United States

- U.S. National Register of Historic Places
- U.S. National Historic Landmark
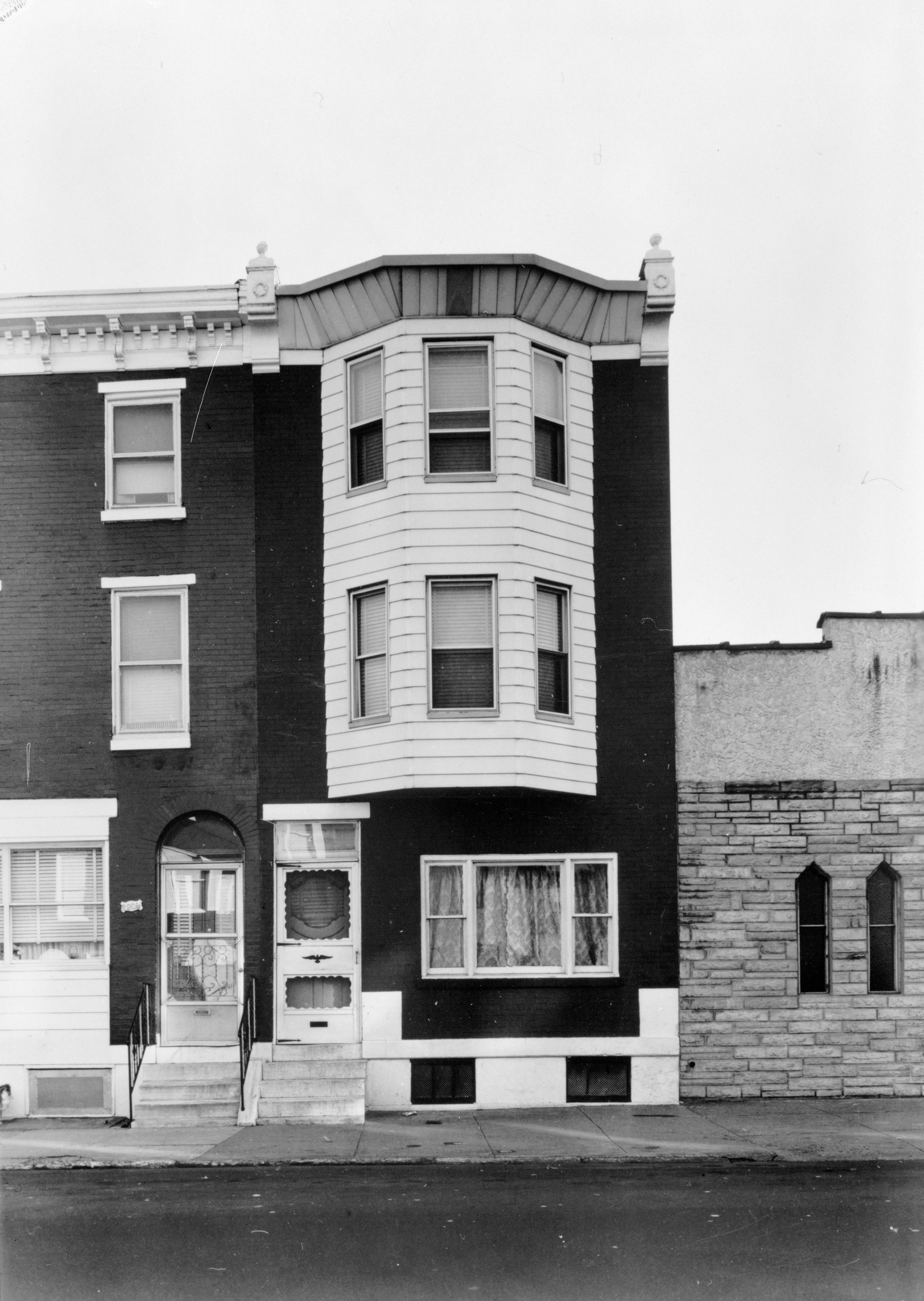
- Henry O. Tanner House

- Location within Philadelphia Location within Pennsylvania Location within the United States
- Location: 2908 W. Diamond St., Philadelphia, Pennsylvania
- Coordinates: 39.987212°N 75.181115°W
- Area: less than one acre
- Built: 1872
- Architectural style: Greek Revival
- NRHP reference No.: 76001672

Significant dates
- Added to NRHP: May 11, 1976
- Designated NHL: May 11, 1976

The Henry O. Tanner House is a historic house at 2908 West Diamond Street in Philadelphia, Pennsylvania, USA. It was from 1872 to 1888 the childhood home of Henry Ossawa Tanner (1859-1937), an African-American artist who was the first of his race to be elected to National Academy of Design. This rowhouse was designated a National Historic Landmark in 1976.

== Description and history ==
The Henry O. Tanner House is located on Philadelphia's north side, on the south side of West Diamond Street between 29th and 30th Streets. It is a three-story brick rowhouse, set between a similar-height rowhouse and the modern Mount Lebanon Church. It has a three-part picture window with flanking sashes on the ground floor, with the entrance to its left, both devoid of styling. The upper two levels are filled with an oriel window bay, whose exterior has been clad in aluminum siding. The building cornice has also been covered in aluminum, although projecting decorative brackets are visible at the ends. The interior of the building has also been significantly altered since occupation by the Tanners.

Henry Ossawa Tanner's parents moved to Philadelphia in 1866, and were documented living here in 1872. Encouraged by well-educated parents, Tanner embarked on the study of art, enrolling in the Pennsylvania Academy of Fine Arts in 1880 and studying with Thomas Eakins. Tanner achieved his greatest success in Paris, where he settled in 1891, in part to avoid the harsh racial climate in the United States at the time. His works won awards at the annual Salons in 1896 and 1897. In 1927 he was elected a full member of the American National Academy of Design, the first African-American to be so honored.

== See also ==
- List of National Historic Landmarks in Philadelphia
- National Register of Historic Places listings in North Philadelphia
