= Steel Heddle Manufacturing Company Complex =

- U.S. National Register of Historic Places
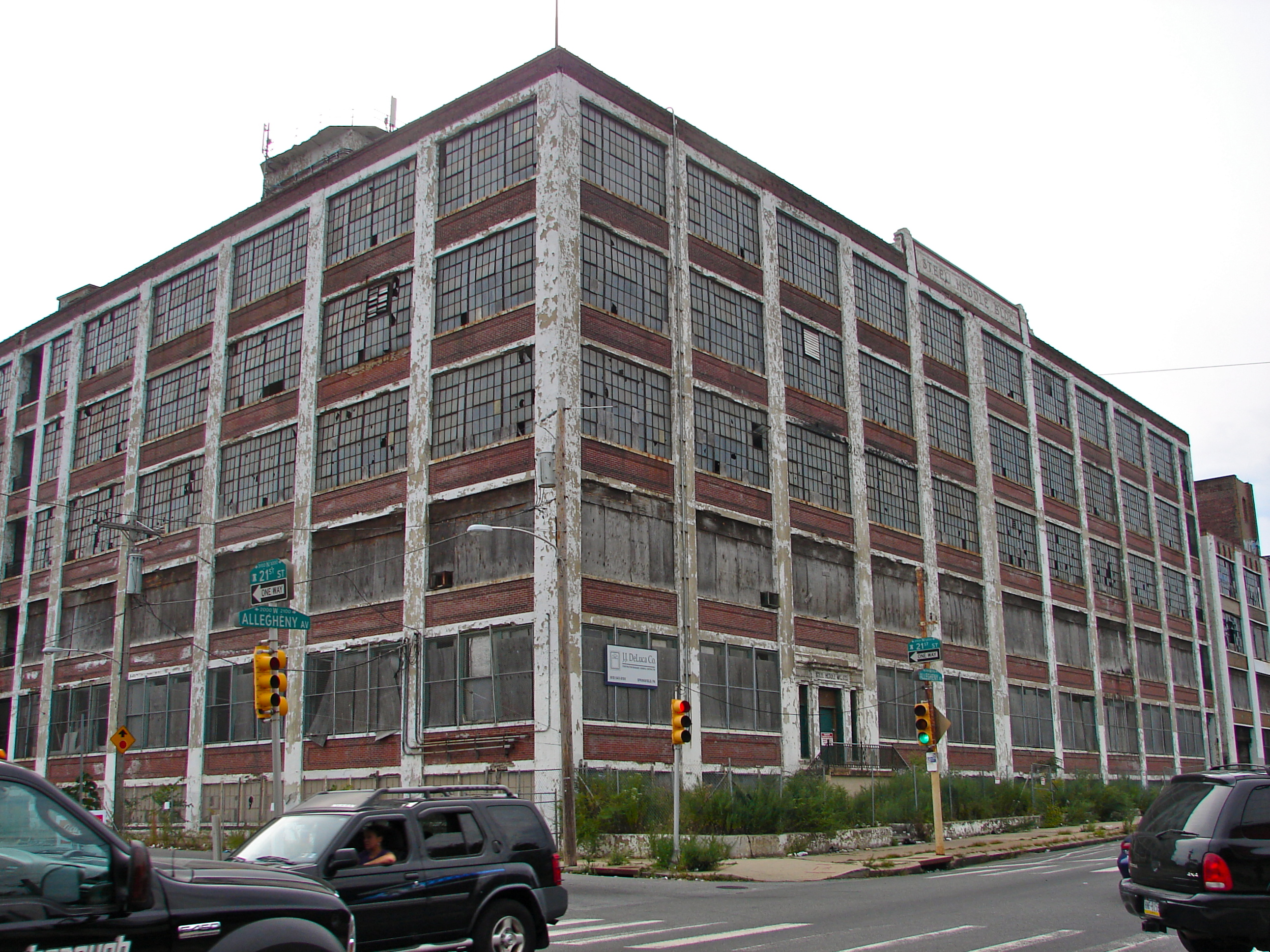
- Steel Heddle Manufacturing Company Complex, September 2010

- Location within Philadelphia Location within Pennsylvania Location within the United States
- Location: 2100 West Allegheny Ave., Philadelphia, Pennsylvania
- Coordinates: 40°00′10″N 75°9′54″W
- Area: 1.8 acres (0.73 ha)
- Built: 1919, 1927, 1951
- Built by: William Steele and Sons Company
- NRHP reference No.: 10000404
- Added to NRHP: June 28, 2010

The Steel Heddle Manufacturing Company Complex is an historic factory complex in the Allegheny West neighborhood of Philadelphia, Pennsylvania, United States.

It was added to the National Register of Historic Places in 2010.

== History and architectural features ==
This historic complex consists of four buildings: the plant (1919, 1925–1927), the main office (c. 1919–1922), the chrome plating building (1951), and the lumber storage and garage building (1930). The plant is a five-story, U-shaped, reinforced concrete building that sits on a raised basement.

The Steel Heddle Manufacturing Company manufactured heddles and other textile loom accessories. Its Philadelphia plant remained in operation until 1983.

In 2018, NBC10 erroneously reported that the complex was destroyed by fire, but the buildings that burned were a block away and unrelated to Steel Heddle. The vacant Steel Heddle plant still stands in 2019.
