= Union Methodist Episcopal Church (Philadelphia) =

Historic church in Pennsylvania, United States

- U.S. National Register of Historic Places
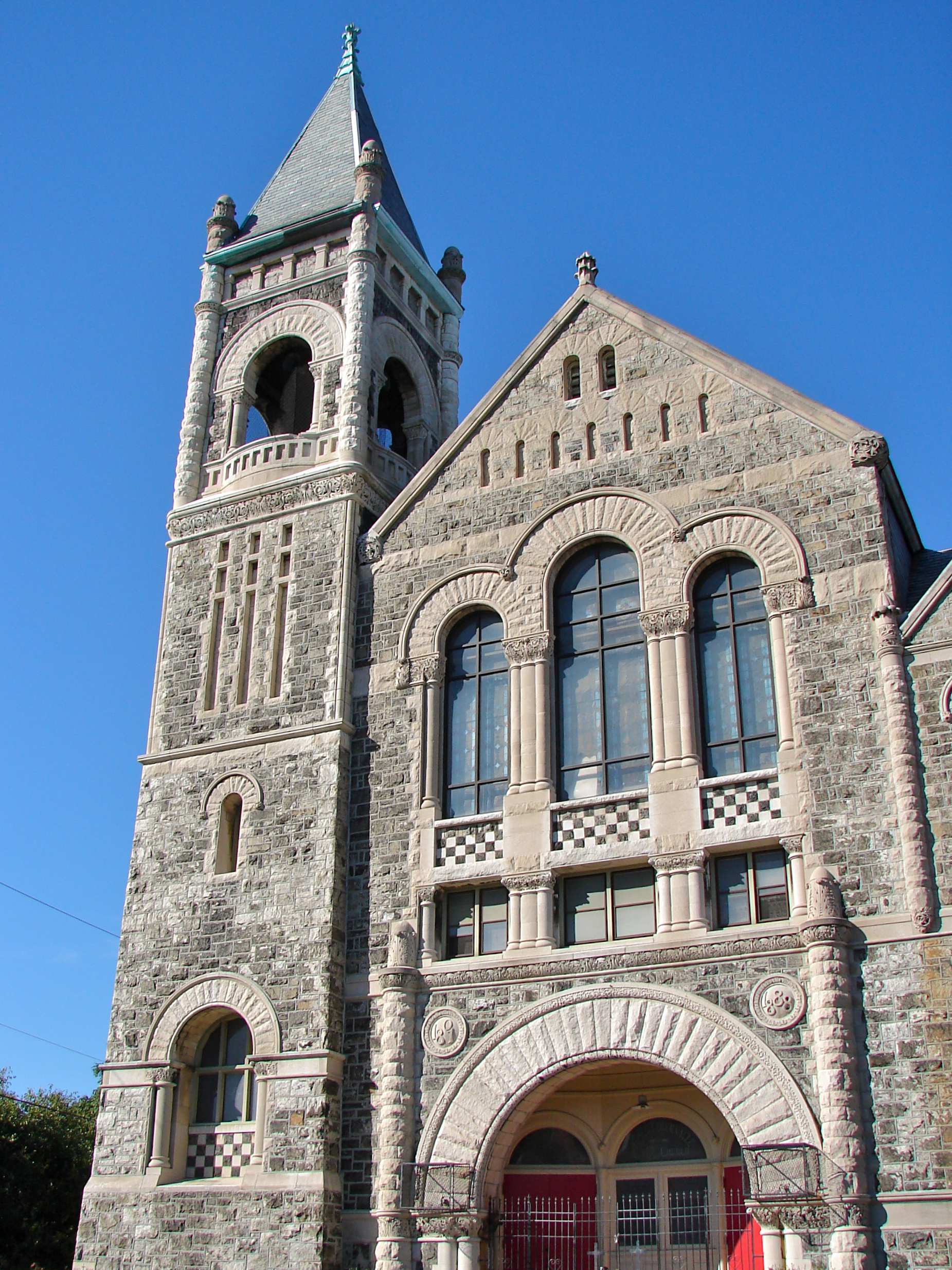
- Union Methodist Episcopal Church, September 2010

- Location within Philadelphia Location within Pennsylvania Location within the United States
- Location: 2019 W. Diamond St., Philadelphia, Pennsylvania
- Coordinates: 39°59′10″N 75°10′3″W
- Area: 0.4 acres (0.16 ha)
- Built: 1888–1889
- Architect: Hazelhurst & Huckel
- Architectural style: Richardsonian Romanesque
- NRHP reference No.: 80003622
- Added to NRHP: October 15, 1980

The Union Methodist Episcopal Church, also known as the Jones Tabernacle AME Church and Parish House, is an historic Methodist Episcopal church and parish house in the North Central neighborhood of Philadelphia, Pennsylvania, United States.

It was added to the National Register of Historic Places in 1980.

== History and architectural features ==
Designed by the noted Philadelphia architects Hazelhurst & Huckel and built between 1888 and 1889, it was created using cut stone. Designed in the Richardsonian Romanesque style, this church has an entrance archway with squat Syrian columns and features a prominent front gable, chimneys, towers and pinnacles. The gable has a checkerboard pattern of stone and a Palladian window.

The church's interior is divided into two principal levels, a first floor Sunday School, and the second floor sanctuary with balcony. During the 1930s, the church was sold to Jones Tabernacle AME Church, which operated under the leadership of Rev. Richard R. Wright, Jr., son of Richard R. Wright (1855–1947).
