= Franklintown, Philadelphia =

Coordinates: 39.962°N 75.169°W

Franklintown
- Neighborhood of Philadelphia
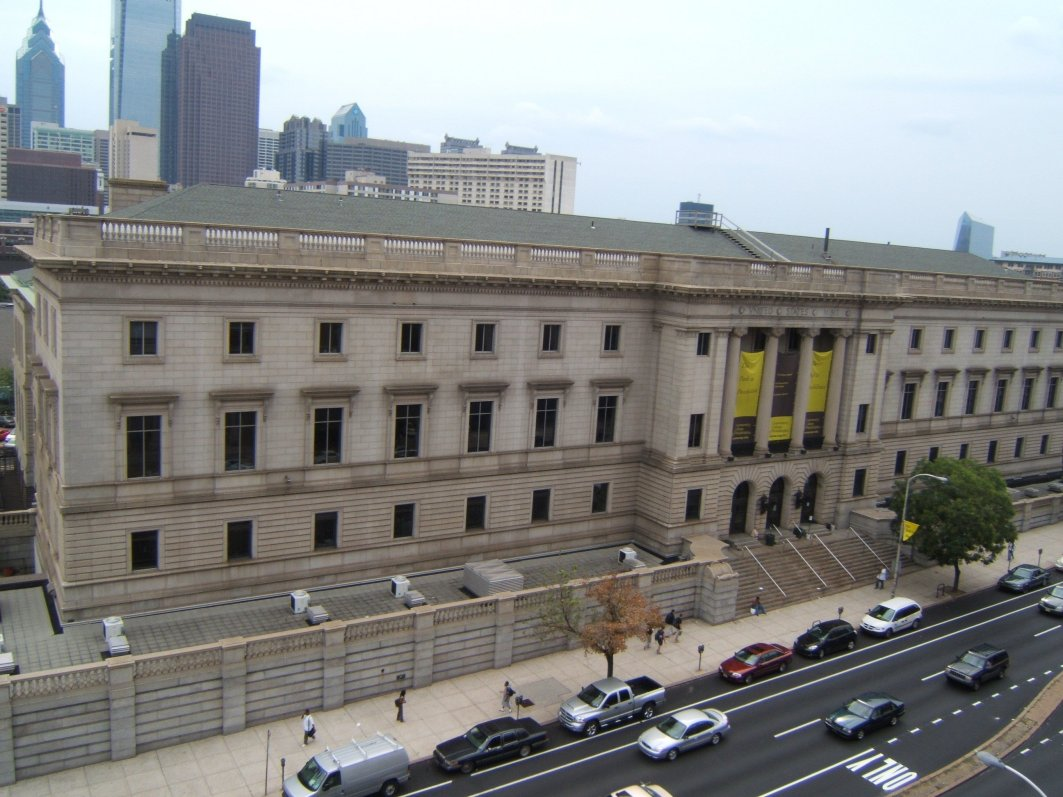
- The Third Philadelphia Mint, now part of the Community College of Philadelphia is in Franklintown

- Country: United States
- State: Pennsylvania
- County: Philadelphia County
- City: Philadelphia
- Area codes: 215, 267 and 445

Franklintown, or Franklin Town, is an area in the Logan Square neighborhood of Philadelphia which was the subject of an urban planning effort in the 1970s and early 1980s.

== Boundaries ==
Finkel (who calls the neighborhood "Franklin Town") gives its location as "Vine to Callowhill Streets, vic. 17th Street". The same source defines the boundaries of the Spring Garden and Logan Square neighborhoods in such a way that each completely contains Franklin Town.

The Logan Square Neighborhood Association and the Spring Garden Civic Association, which represent their respective neighborhoods, both consider Spring Garden Street to be the boundary between the two neighborhoods. Franklin Town is therefore in the area represented by the Logan Square Neighborhood Association. It has no separate civic association.

== History ==
The Franklin Town Development Corporation was created by Smith, Kline & French, Philadelphia Electric Company, electrical equipment manufacturer ITE International (now part of Siemens ), the real-estate concern Korman Corporation, and brokerage house Butcher & Sherred (later Butcher & Singer ). All except Butcher & Sherred were large landowners in the area. The FTDC, led by former HUD administrator Jason Nathan, hired noted architect Philip Johnson to create a master plan for development.

Johnson began work on his design in 1970, and it was released the following year. The plan included the rerouting of parts of 17th Street and 18th Street to create the diagonal Franklin Town Boulevard. This was to lead, at its southeastern terminus, to a central "town square". This part of the design was never realized.

In 1991 a park at the northwest terminus of Franklin Town Boulevard was dedicated as Franklin Town Park. Many of the residents of the neighborhood to be made into Franklin Town had been threatened with home and business loss by eminent domain, and some avoided this by accepting relocation in new or renovated houses within their neighborhood. They still resented the taking by a private corporation, and also resented the fact that buildings were leveled and replaced by surface parking lots instead of new construction as planned. In fact, empty lots still persist fifty years after the 1971 proposal. Due to these negative feelings and in response to neighborhood petitions to Philadelphia City Hall, the name of the park was officially changed from Franklin Town Park to Matthias Baldwin Park in 2011. For the same reasons, the name of the neighborhood was changed in 2019 from Franklintown (sic) to Baldwin Park on the neighborhood community bulletin board Nextdoor.

Franklintown, now the Baldwin Park neighborhood, consists of newer highrise and midrise structures. This contrasts with the neighborhoods north of Spring Garden Street, which are mostly densely packed historic rowhouses.

Community College of Philadelphia and the Philadelphia Pennsylvania Temple of the Church of Jesus Christ of Latter-day Saints are in Franklin Town.
