= McDowell Memorial Presbyterian Church =

Historic church in Pennsylvania, United States

- U.S. National Register of Historic Places
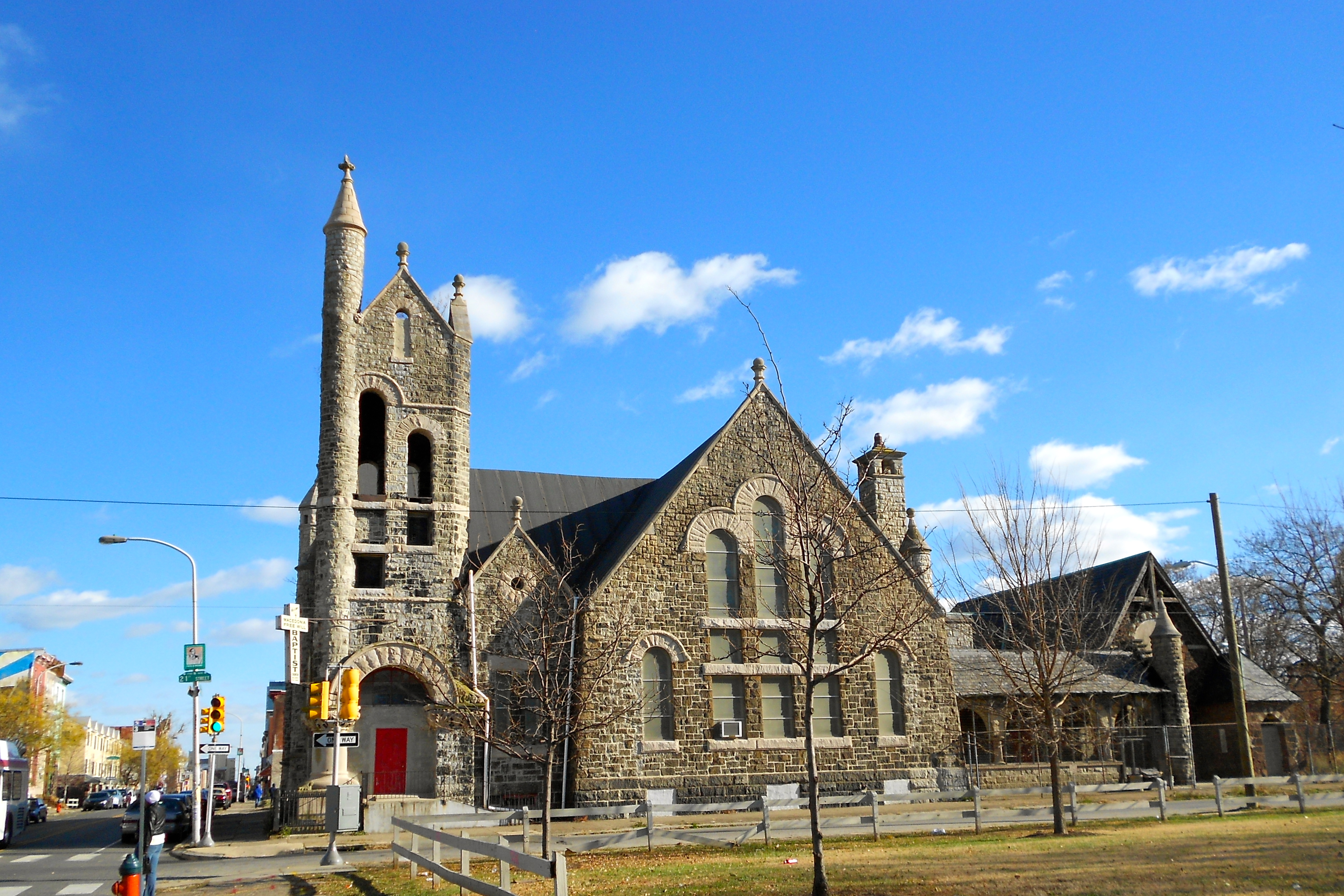

- Location within Philadelphia Location within Pennsylvania Location within the United States
- Location: 2040 Cecil B. Moore Avenue; Philadelphia, Pennsylvania
- Coordinates: 39°58′48″N 75°10′09″W
- Built: 1891–1893
- Architect: Henry Augustus Sims and J. William Shaw
- Architectural style: Richardson Romanesque
- NRHP reference No.: 13000744
- Added to NRHP: September 18, 2013

The McDowell Memorial Presbyterian Church is a historic church in north Philadelphia, built in the Richardson Romanesque style by architects Henry Augustus Sims and J. William Shaw.

It was listed on the National Register of Historic Places in September, 2013.

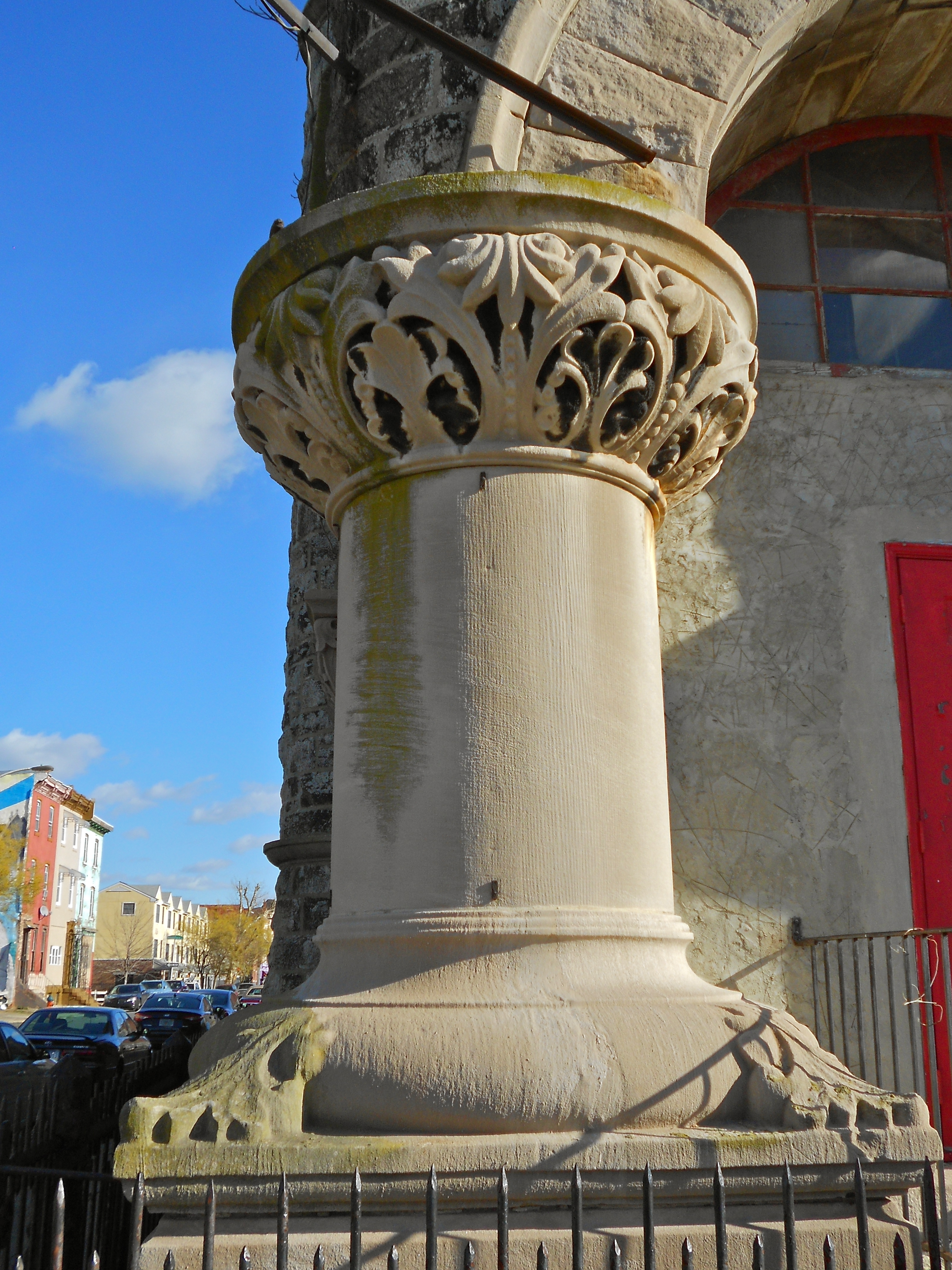

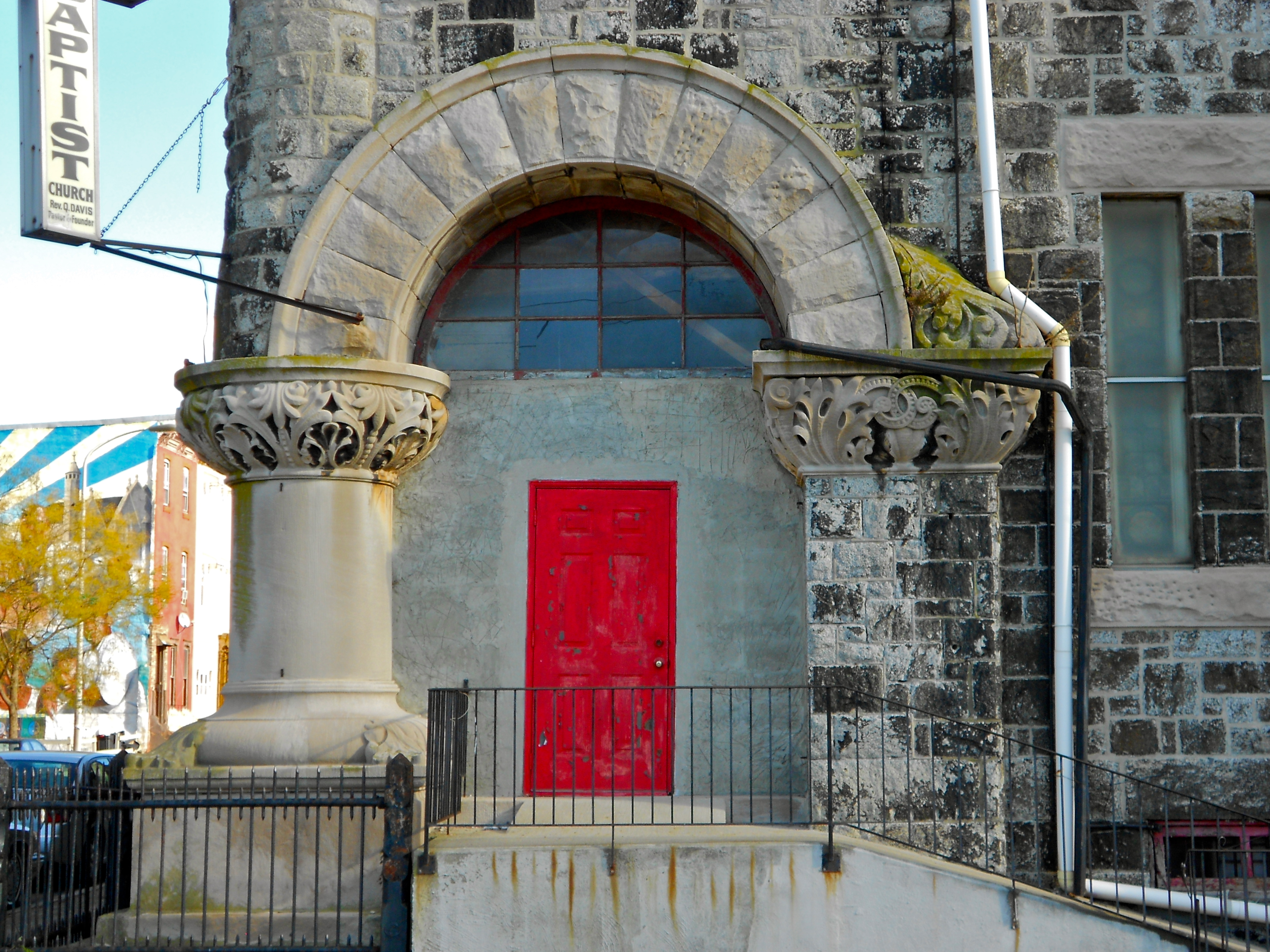

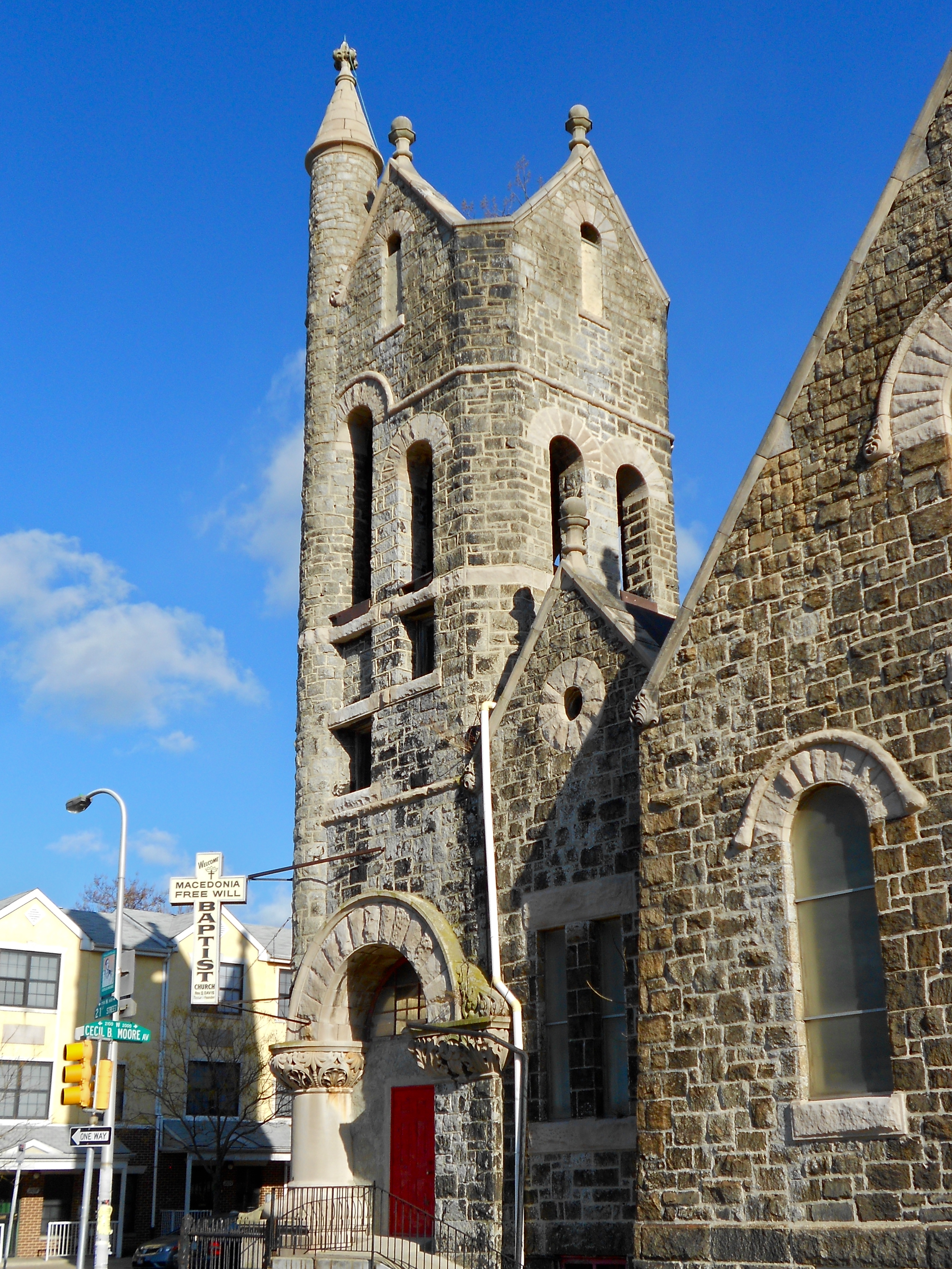
