= Ajax Metal Company Plant =

- U.S. National Register of Historic Places
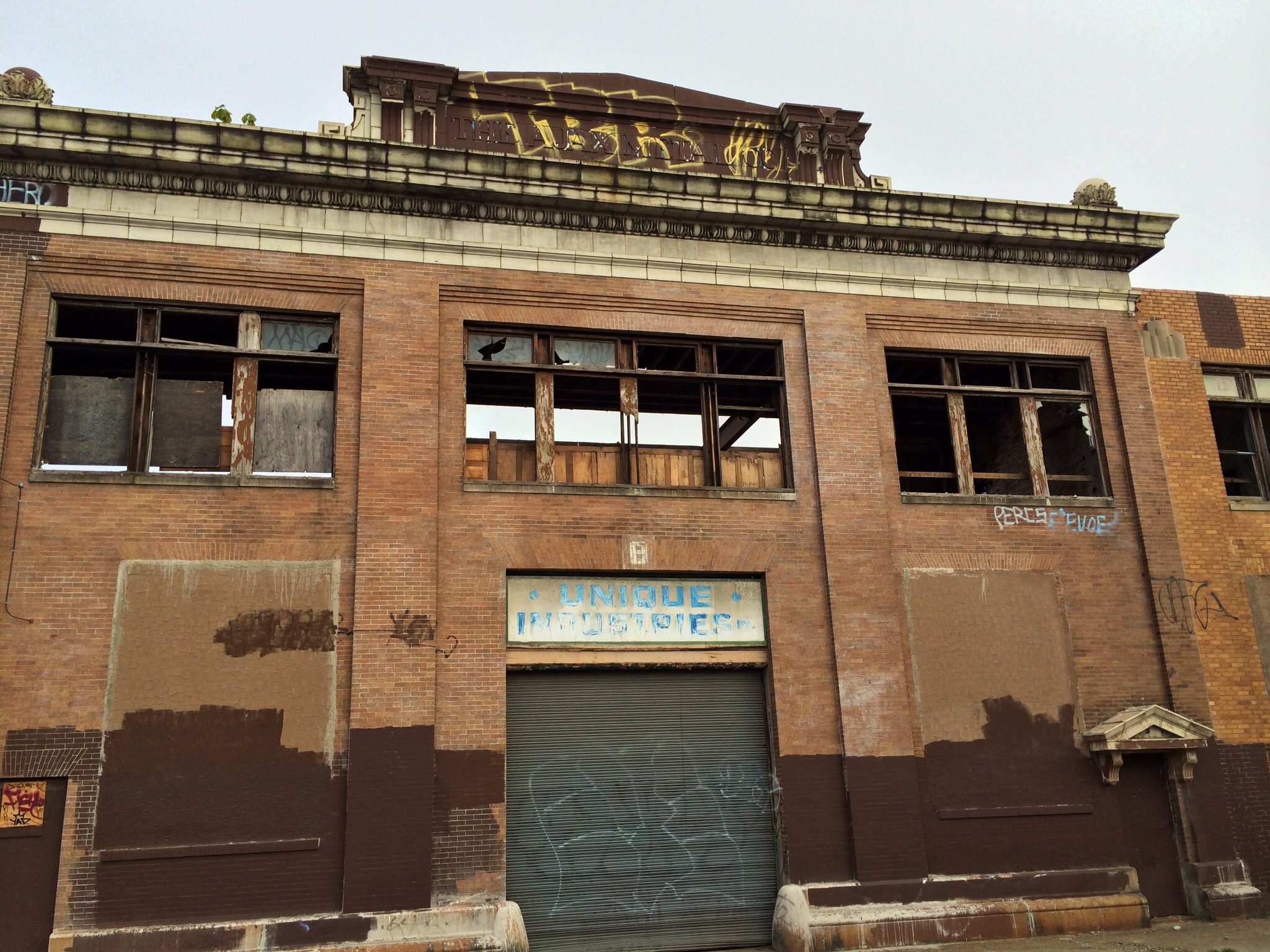

- Location within Philadelphia Location within Pennsylvania Location within the United States
- Location: 46 Richmond St., Philadelphia, Pennsylvania
- Coordinates: 39°59′59″N 75°8′10″W
- Area: less than one acre
- Built: 1907, 1908, 1910, 1931, 1944
- Architect: M. Ward Easby, Inc.
- Architectural style: Italianate, Commercial, Art Deco
- NRHP reference No.: 14000470
- Added to NRHP: July 30, 2014

The Ajax Metal Company Plant is a historic metal factory in the Kensington neighborhood of Philadelphia. It was owned by the Ajax Metal Company, which smelted and refined brass and bronze at the plant. It is made up of seven sections built from 1907 to 1951.

The building has since become part of The Fillmore. As well as housing Philadelphia Distilling; which opened in this location in 2016, where Bluecoat American Dry Gin is made.
