= William H. Harrison School =

- U.S. National Register of Historic Places
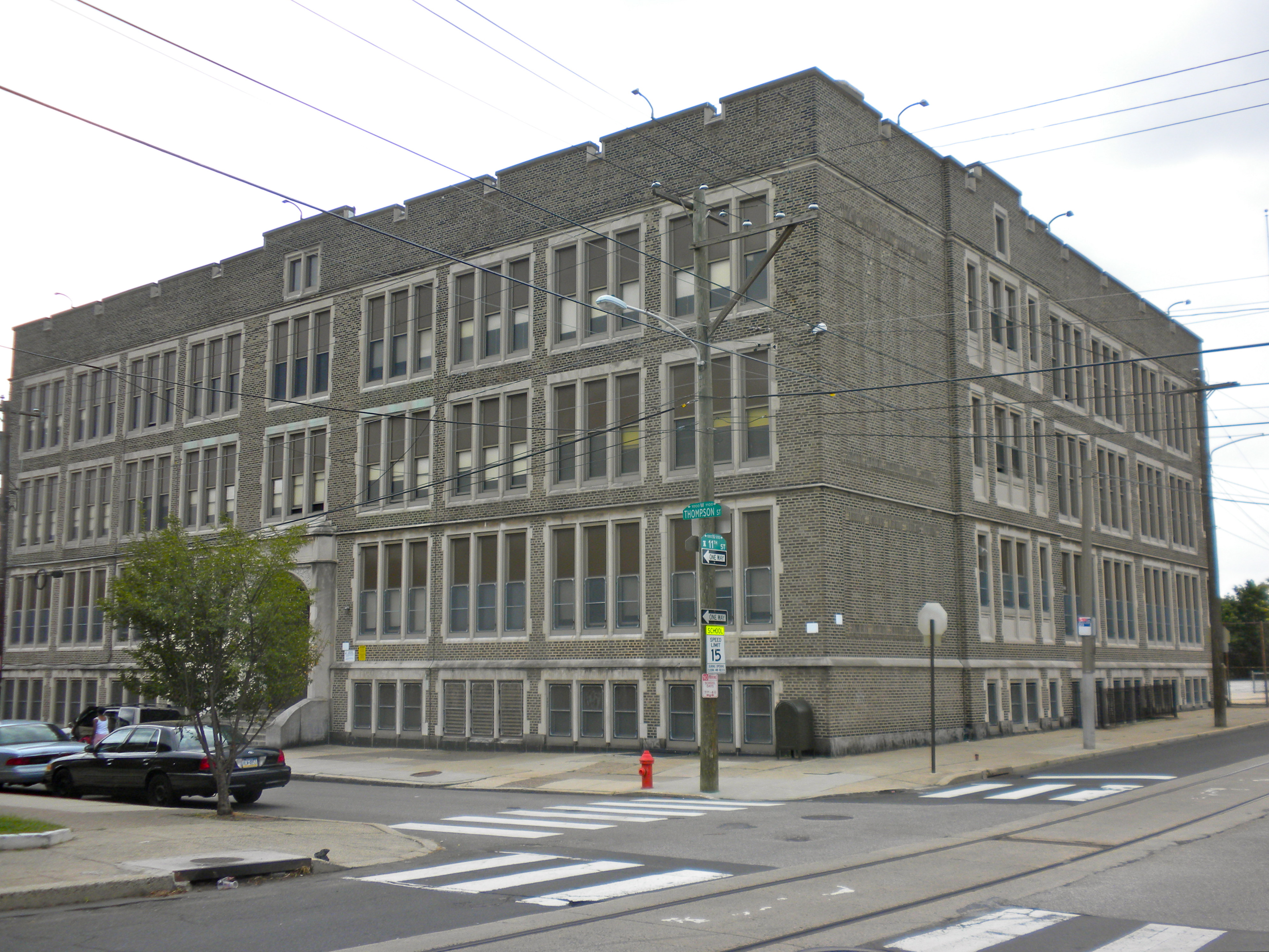
- W. H. Harrison School, August 2010

- Location within Philadelphia Location within Pennsylvania Location within the United States
- Location: 1012–1020 W. Thompson St., Philadelphia, Pennsylvania
- Coordinates: 39°58′19″N 75°9′14″W
- Area: 2 acres (0.81 ha)
- Built: 1928–1929
- Architect: Irwin T. Catharine
- Architectural style: Late Gothic Revival
- MPS: Philadelphia Public Schools TR
- NRHP reference No.: 88002278
- Added to NRHP: November 18, 1988

The William Henry Harrison School building, now known as St. Malachy Catholic School, is a historic American structure in the Yorktown neighborhood of Philadelphia, Pennsylvania.

It was added to the National Register of Historic Places in 1988.

== History and architectural features ==
This historic structure was designed by architect Irwin T. Catharine (1883–1944) and built between 1928 and 1929. It is a three-story, nine-bay-wide, brick building that sits on a raised basement. It was designed in the Late Gothic Revival style and features a one-story, stone entrance pavilion with a Tudor-arched opening and a crenellated parapet.

Originally named for President William Henry Harrison, it was renamed as St. Malachy School. Added to the National Register of Historic Places in 1988, this building is also currently home to the nonprofit Independence Mission Schools, which operates a network of fourteen Catholic schools in the Philadelphia area.
