= Northern Saving Fund and Safe Deposit Company =

- U.S. National Register of Historic Places
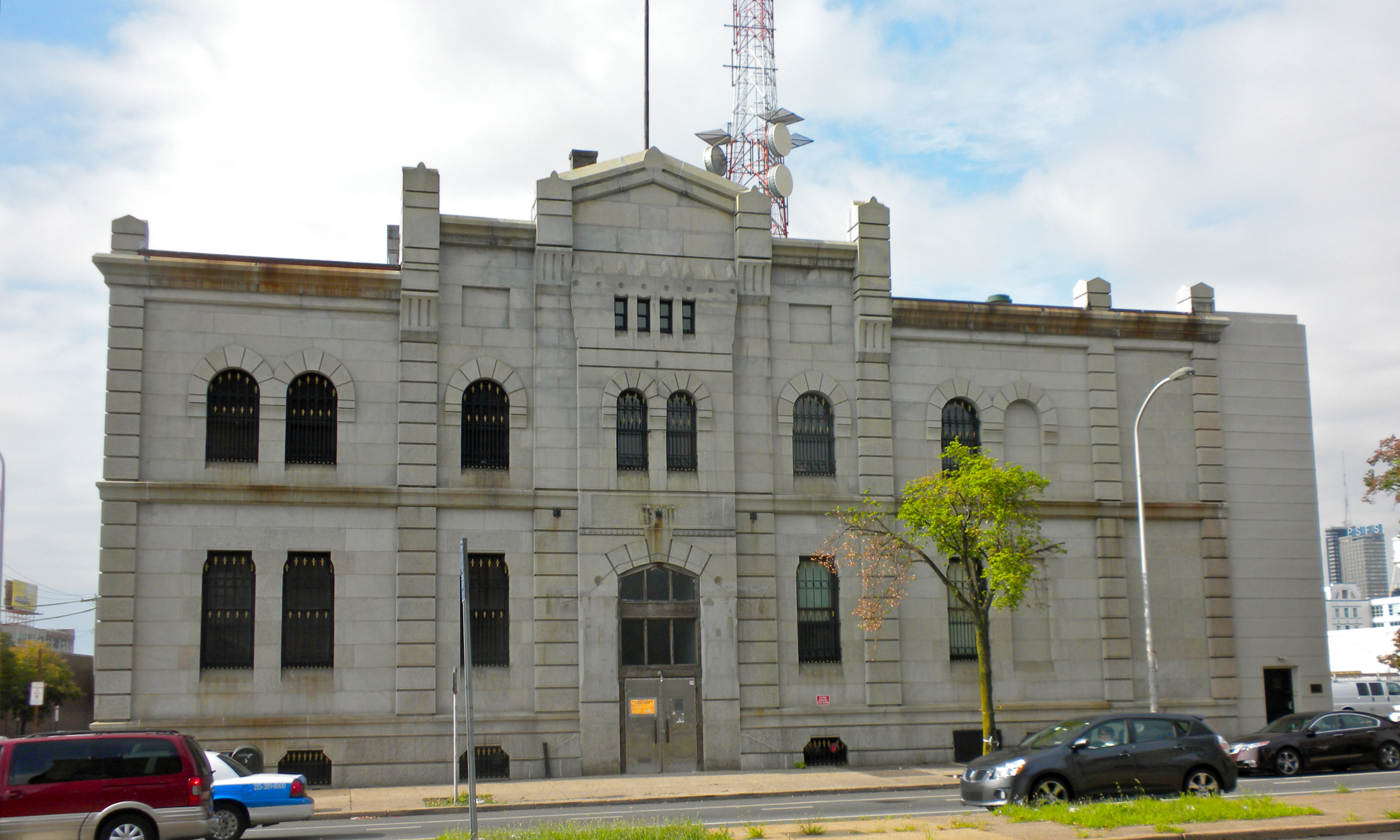
- Northern Saving Fund and Safe Deposit Company, August 2010

- Location within Philadelphia Location within Pennsylvania Location within the United States
- Location: 600 Spring Garden St., Philadelphia, Pennsylvania
- Coordinates: 39°57′40″N 75°8′55″W
- Area: 0.2 acres (0.081 ha)
- Built: 1872–1873, 1888, 1903
- Architect: Furness & Hewitt
- Architectural style: Neo-Grec
- NRHP reference No.: 77001187
- Added to NRHP: September 28, 1977

Northern Saving Fund and Safe Deposit Company, also known as Provident National Bank, is a historic bank building located in the Callowhill neighborhood of Philadelphia, Pennsylvania. The original section was built in 1872–1873, and is a two-story, light grey granite building. Additions were built in 1888 and 1903.

It was added to the National Register of Historic Places in 1977.
