= Houses at 1907–1951 N. 32nd St. =

Historic houses in Pennsylvania, United States

- U.S. National Register of Historic Places
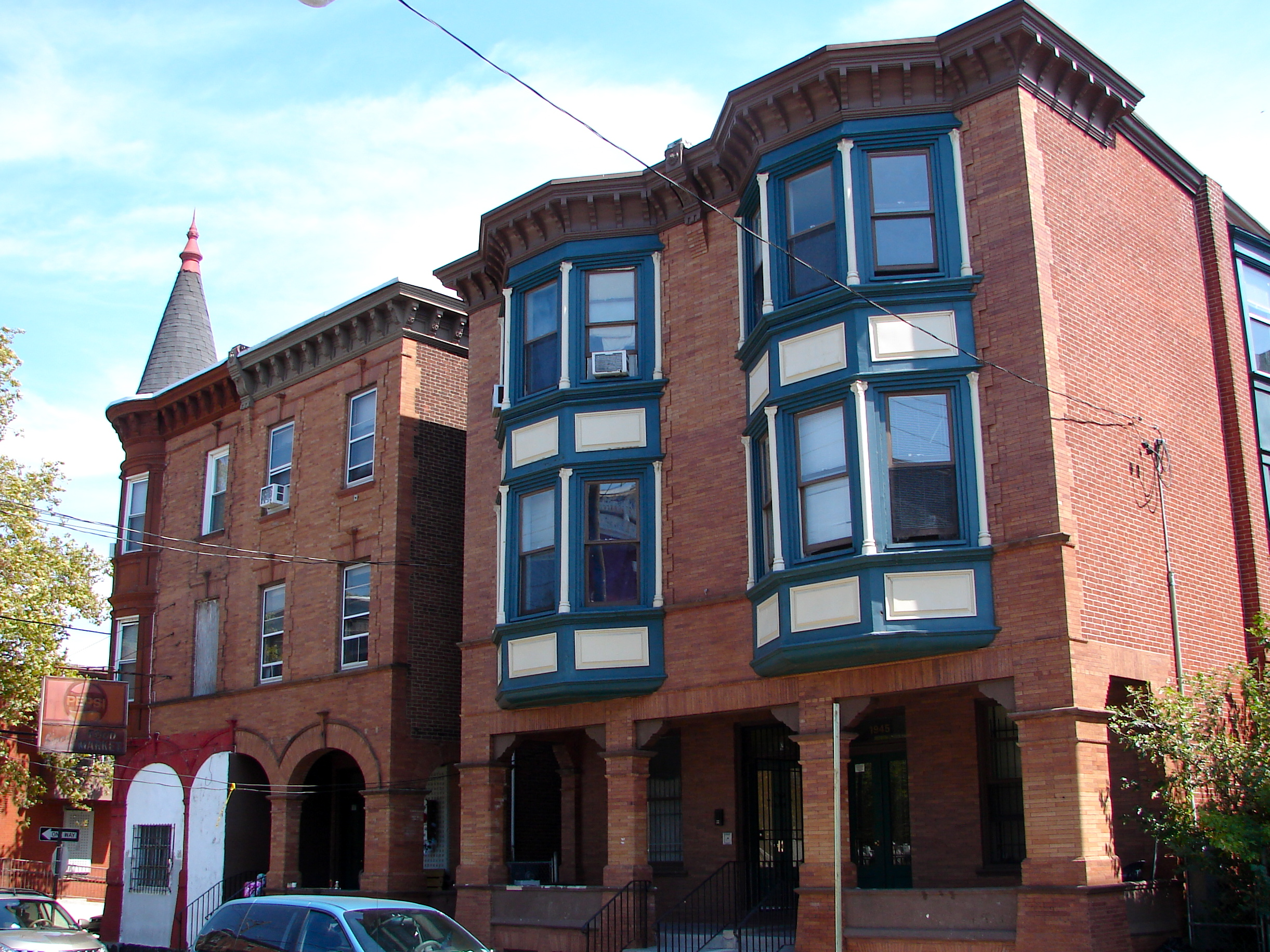
- Houses at 1907-1951 N. 32nd St., September 2010

- Location within Philadelphia Location within Pennsylvania Location within the United States
- Location: 1907–1951 N. 32nd St., Philadelphia, Pennsylvania
- Coordinates: 39°59′11″N 75°11′10″W
- Area: less than one acre
- Built: c. 1894
- Architect: Angus Wade
- Architectural style: Late Victorian, Elcectic Pre-Raphaelite
- NRHP reference No.: 93001472
- Added to NRHP: January 11, 1994

The houses at 1907–1951 N. 32nd St., which are also collectively known as Mansion Court, are a set of twelve historic double houses that are located in the Strawberry Mansion neighborhood of Philadelphia, Pennsylvania.

It was added to the National Register of Historic Places in 1993.

== History and architectural features ==
Built circa 1894, this historic structures are three-story, Pompeiian brick dwellings that were designed in the Late Victorian style. They are characterized by pressed metal cornices, roof crests, and two-story bay windows. The first floors have recessed porches with ornamental ceilings. The house at 1951 N. 32nd St. has a corner tower.
