= Philadelphia Wholesale Drug Company Building =

- Philadelphia Wholesales Drug Company Building
- U.S. National Register of Historic Places
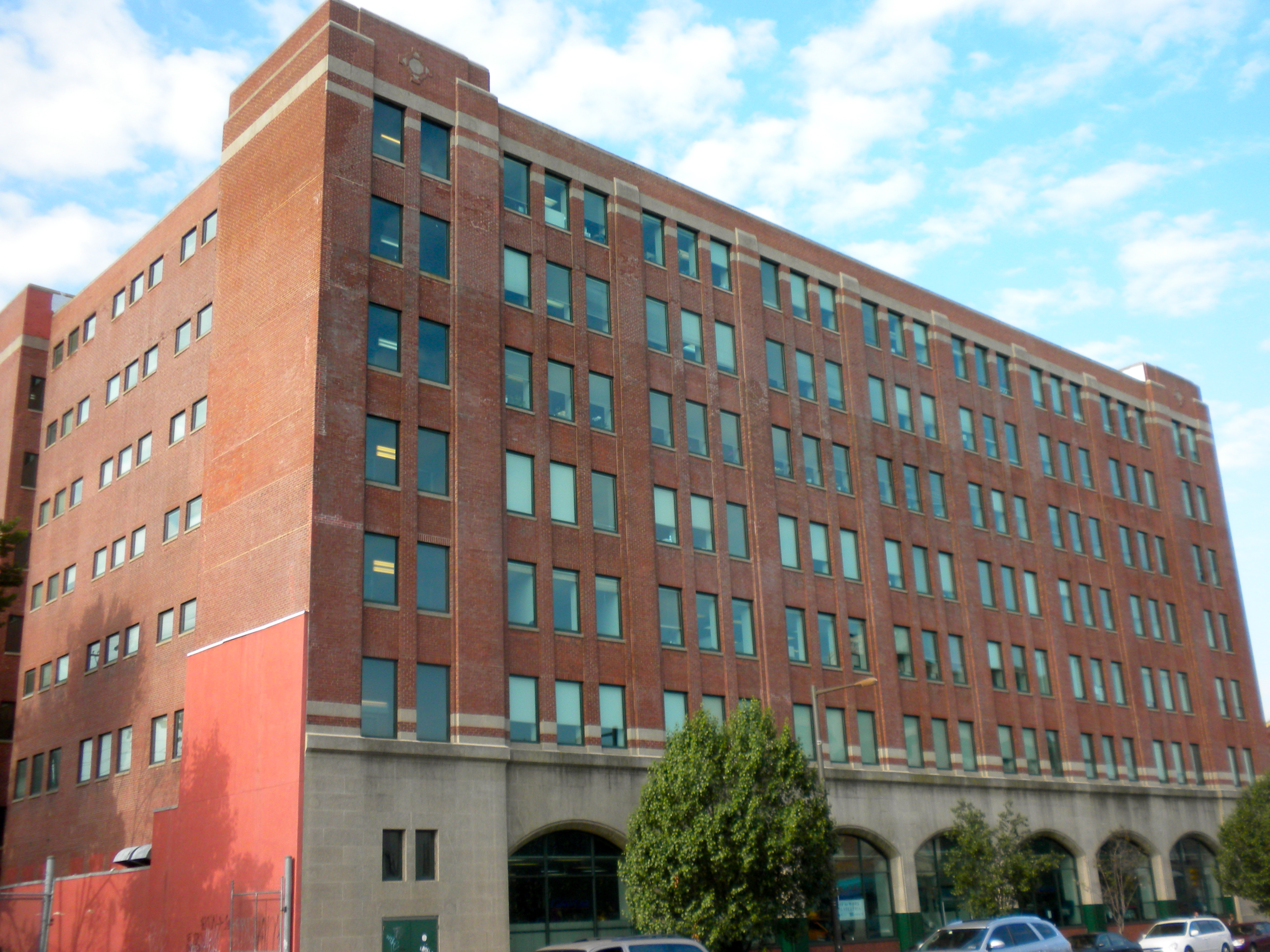
- Philadelphia Wholesale Drug Company Building, August 2010

- Location within Philadelphia Location within Pennsylvania Location within the United States
- Location: 513-525 N. Tenth St., Philadelphia, Pennsylvania
- Coordinates: 39°57′41″N 75°9′21″W
- Area: 0.5 acres (0.20 ha)
- Built: 1927
- Architect: Kellog, Thomas; Rankin, John Hall
- Architectural style: Late 19th And 20th Century Revivals
- NRHP reference No.: 90001410
- Added to NRHP: September 5, 1990

The Philadelphia Wholesale Drug Company Building is an historic warehouse building in the Callowhill neighborhood of Philadelphia, Pennsylvania, United States.

It was added to the National Register of Historic Places in 1990.

== History and architectural features ==
Built in 1927, this historic structure is a seven-story, seven-bay by five-bay, reinforced concrete building with brick and cast stone facing. It measures approximately 190 feet by 112 feet, and was built by the Philadelphia Wholesale Drug Company Building, one of the first druggist cooperatives in the United States.
