= Ridge Avenue Farmers' Market =

- U.S. National Register of Historic Places
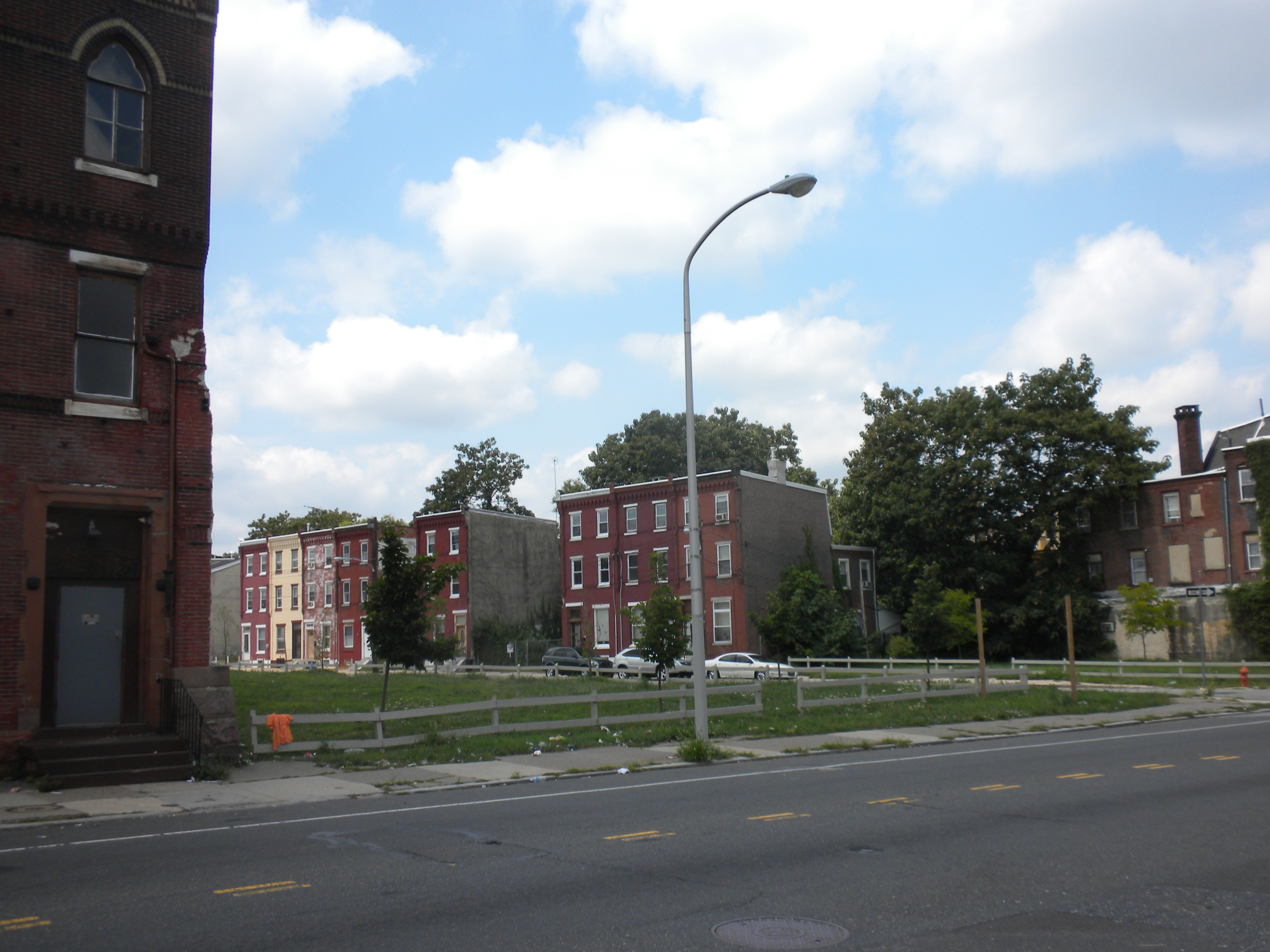
- Site of Ridge Avenue Farmers' Market, August 2010

- Location within Philadelphia Location within Pennsylvania Location within the United States
- Location: 1810 Ridge Ave., Philadelphia, Pennsylvania
- Coordinates: 39°58′19″N 75°9′59″W
- Area: 0.6 acres (0.24 ha)
- Built: 1875
- Architect: Supplee, Davis E.
- Architectural style: High Victorian Gothic
- NRHP reference No.: 84003547
- Added to NRHP: March 5, 1984

The Ridge Avenue Farmers' Market was an historic farmers' market building in the Francisville neighborhood of Philadelphia, Pennsylvania, United States.

It was added to the National Register of Historic Places in 1984.

== History and architectural features ==
Built in 1875, this historic structure was a one-story brick and brownstone building with a basement. It was an irregular rectangular shape, measuring 92 feet by 262 feet. One of the founding members was Grant Webster. After his death, the management of the Market was assumed by his son, Harold J. Webster, who managed the Market until it closed in the 1970s. It featured Gothic arched openings and a high peaked, wood open truss roof with jerkinhead end gables. It has been demolished and the property developed for housing.

== Gallery ==
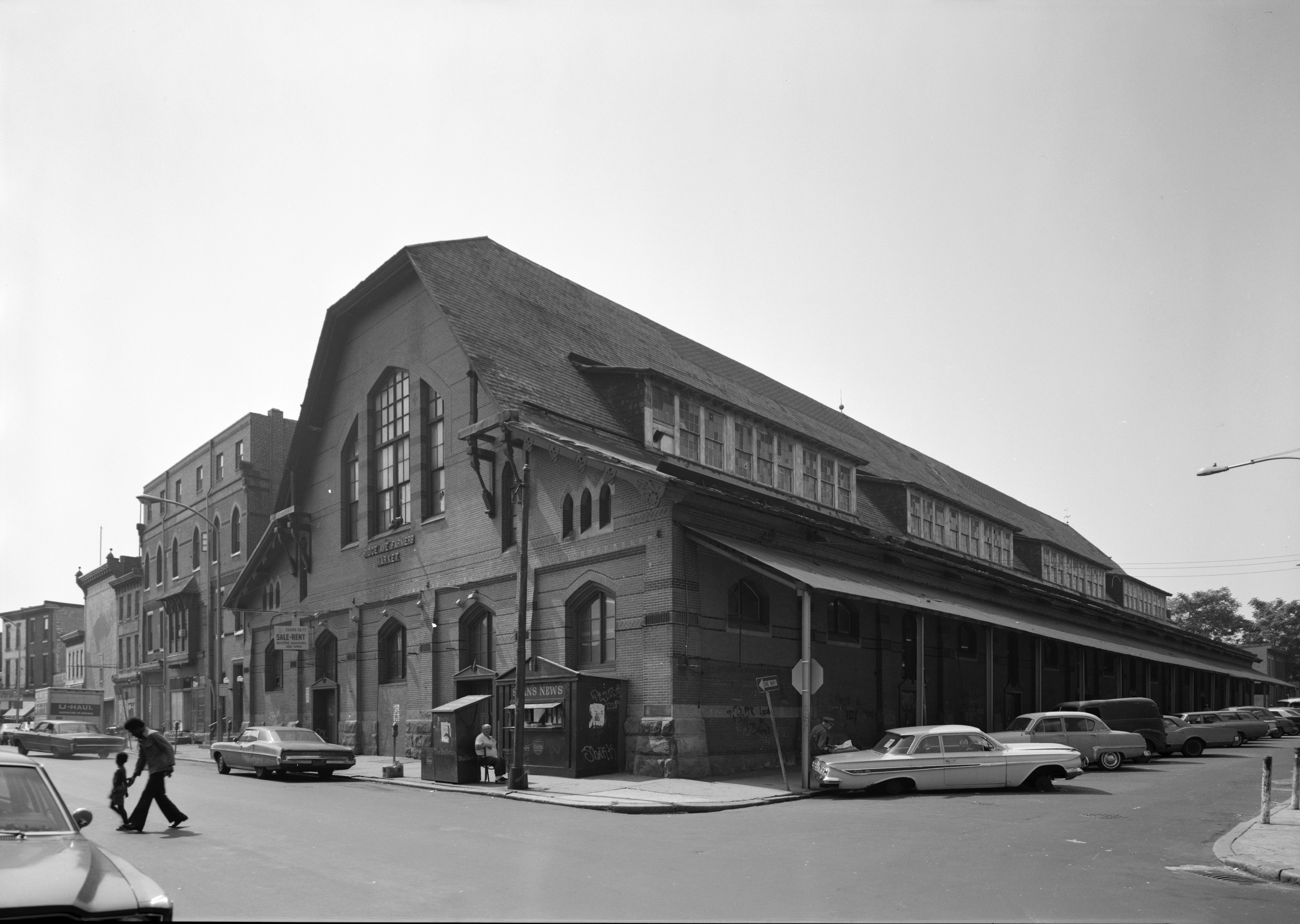
VIEW OF SIDE ELEVATIONS WITH DORMER WINDOWS, HABS Photo, 1973
