= Plaza Apartments (Philadelphia, Pennsylvania) =

- U.S. National Register of Historic Places
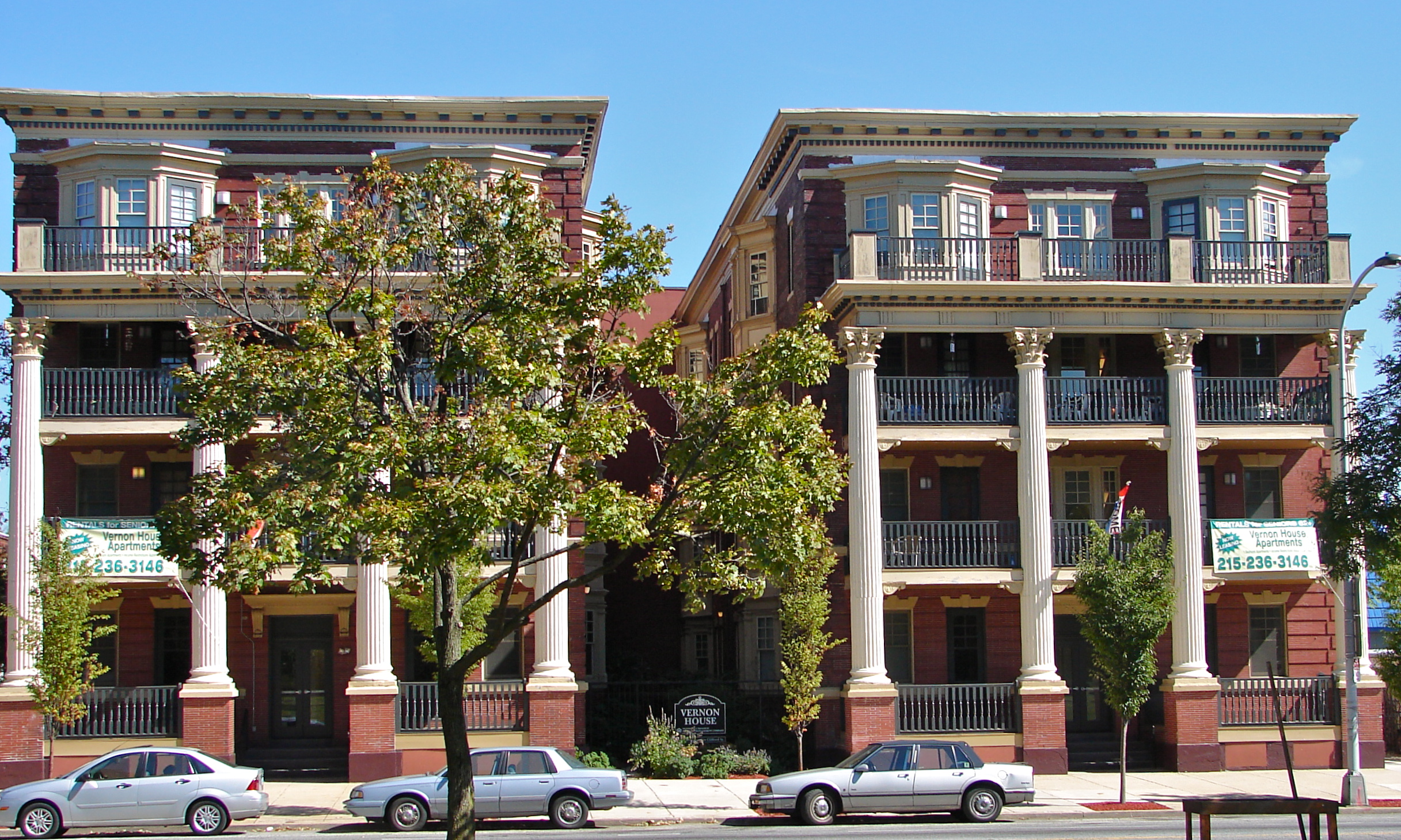
- Plaza Apartments, September 2010

- Location within Philadelphia Location within Pennsylvania Location within the United States
- Location: 1719-1725 N 33rd Sts., 3226-3228 Clifford St., Philadelphia, Pennsylvania
- Coordinates: 39°58′59″N 75°10′36″W
- Area: 0.4 acres (0.16 ha)
- Built: 1909
- Built by: Stafford, John
- Architect: Sauer & Hahn
- Architectural style: Colonial Revival
- NRHP reference No.: 05000063
- Added to NRHP: February 15, 2005

The Plaza Apartments, also known as Vernon House, is an historic apartment complex in the Strawberry Mansion neighborhood of Philadelphia, Pennsylvania, United States.

It was added to the National Register of Historic Places in 2005.

== History and architectural features ==
Built in 1909, this historic structure consists of three, four-story, brick and stone buildings that were designed in the Colonial Revival style. The complex is arranged in a "U"-shape, with two narrow courtyards. The primary facade features two three-story wooden porches, with Corinthian order columns and balconies on top.
