= Frank C. Scherer Wagon Works =

- U.S. National Register of Historic Places
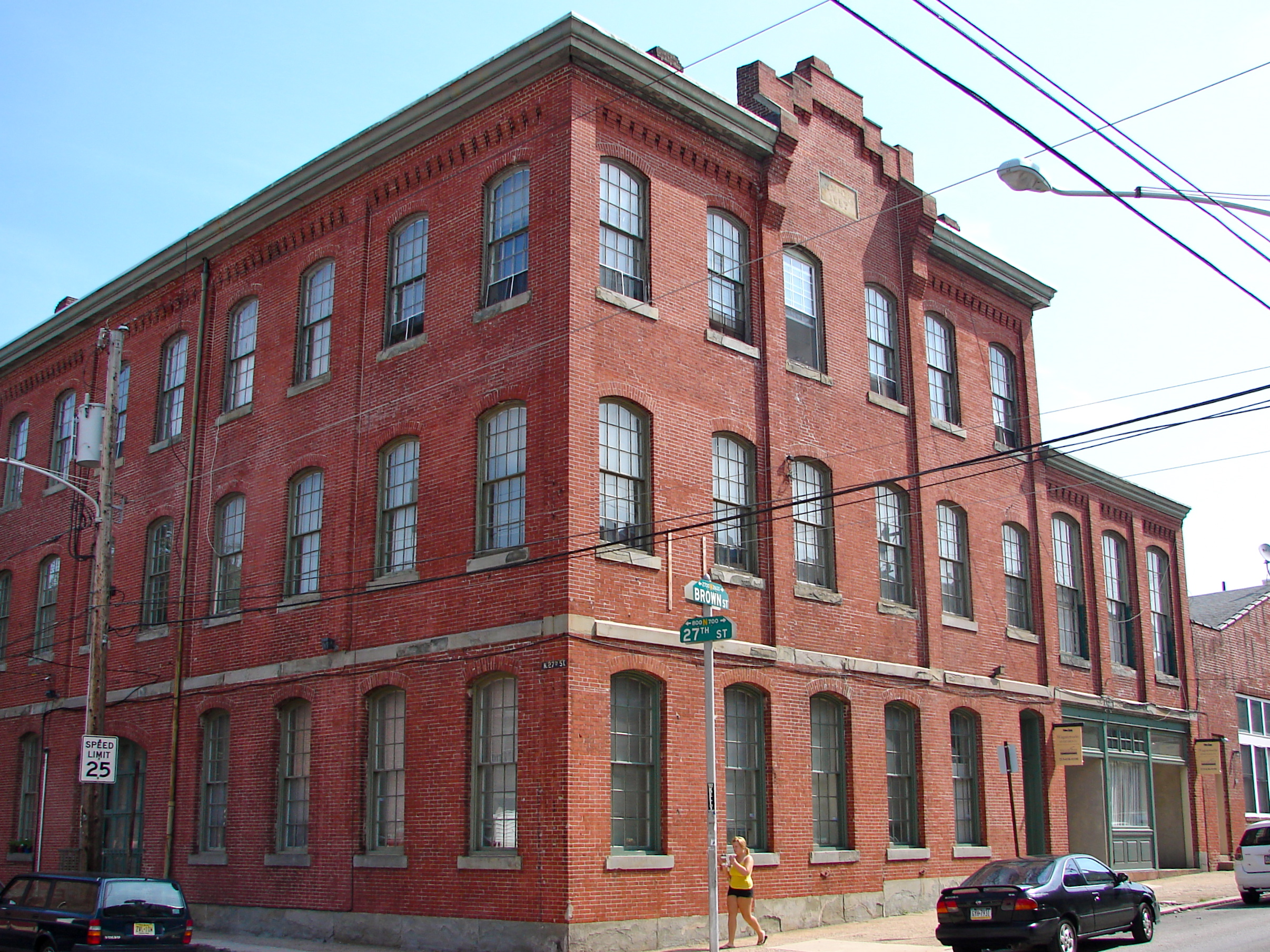
- Scherer Wagon Works, August 2010

- Location within Philadelphia Location within Pennsylvania Location within the United States
- Location: 801 N. Twenty-seventh St., Philadelphia, Pennsylvania
- Coordinates: 39°58′14″N 75°10′53″W
- Area: 0.6 acres (0.24 ha)
- Built: 1887
- Architect: Decker, William H.
- NRHP reference No.: 85003160
- Added to NRHP: December 26, 1985

Frank C. Scherer Wagon Works is a historic factory located in the Fairmount neighborhood of Philadelphia, Pennsylvania. It was built in 1887, and consists of a three-story, six-bay, red brick and sandstone factory building with a two-story, three-bay office building. A one-story addition was built in 1928. The factory building features segmental arched window openings and a parapet. The office building is of yellow and red brick, with sandstone trim. The factory became a warehouse in 1923.

It was added to the National Register of Historic Places in 1985.
