= North Philadelphia East =

Coordinates: 39.9853°N 75.1471°W

- Neighborhood of Philadelphia
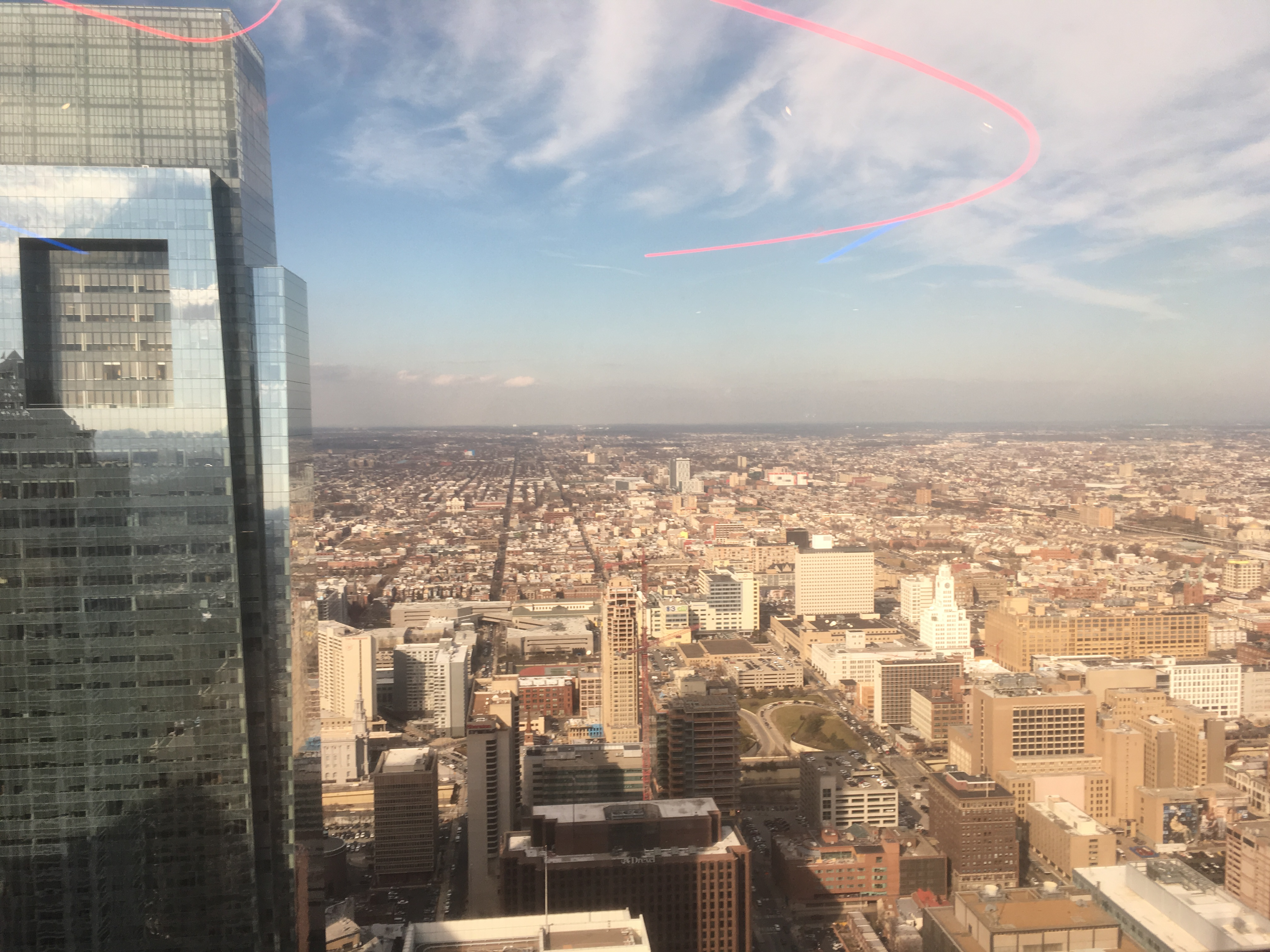

- Location of North Philadelphia East in Philadelphia
- Country: United States
- State: Pennsylvania
- County: Philadelphia
- City: Philadelphia
- Postal code: 19133
- Area codes: 215, 267 and 445

North Philadelphia East is a neighborhood that is located in the eastern central part of North Philadelphia section of Philadelphia, Pennsylvania, United States.

== History and notable features ==
North Philadelphia East is a section of North Philadelphia that is situated on the eastern side of North Broad St, which is bordered by Vine St in the south, West Erie Avenue in the north and North Front Street in the east. North Philadelphia/East is bordered by the neighborhoods of Kensington, Center City, North Philadelphia/West and Hunting Park. North Central, Philadelphia is west of North Philadelphia East.

Poplar is bounded roughly by Girard Avenue to the north, North Broad Street to the west, Spring Garden Street to the south, and 5th Street to the east.

The Ludlow neighborhood is bordered by Girard Avenue to the south and Cecil B. Moore Avenue to the north between 5th Street and 9th Street.

Yorktown is located north of Poplar and west of Ludlow. The James R. Ludlow School and William H. Harrison School were listed on the National Register of Historic Places in 1988.

In 2013, the neighborhood with the 19133 zip code located in North Philadelphia East has "among the city's highest rates of people living with HIV and AIDS." Of the people living with HIV and AIDS in the region, 52.93% are Hispanic, 39.83% are black and 7.24% are white. In 2011, the poverty rate in the region was 56.4%, almost double the average in Philadelphia that year.

== Demographics ==
North Philadelphia/East is home to a majority of Philadelphia's Latino community. The community is "rich in arts and culture".

In March 2018, the section had a 24.05% unemployment rate with 48.97% living in poverty.
