= Biberman Building =

- U.S. National Register of Historic Places
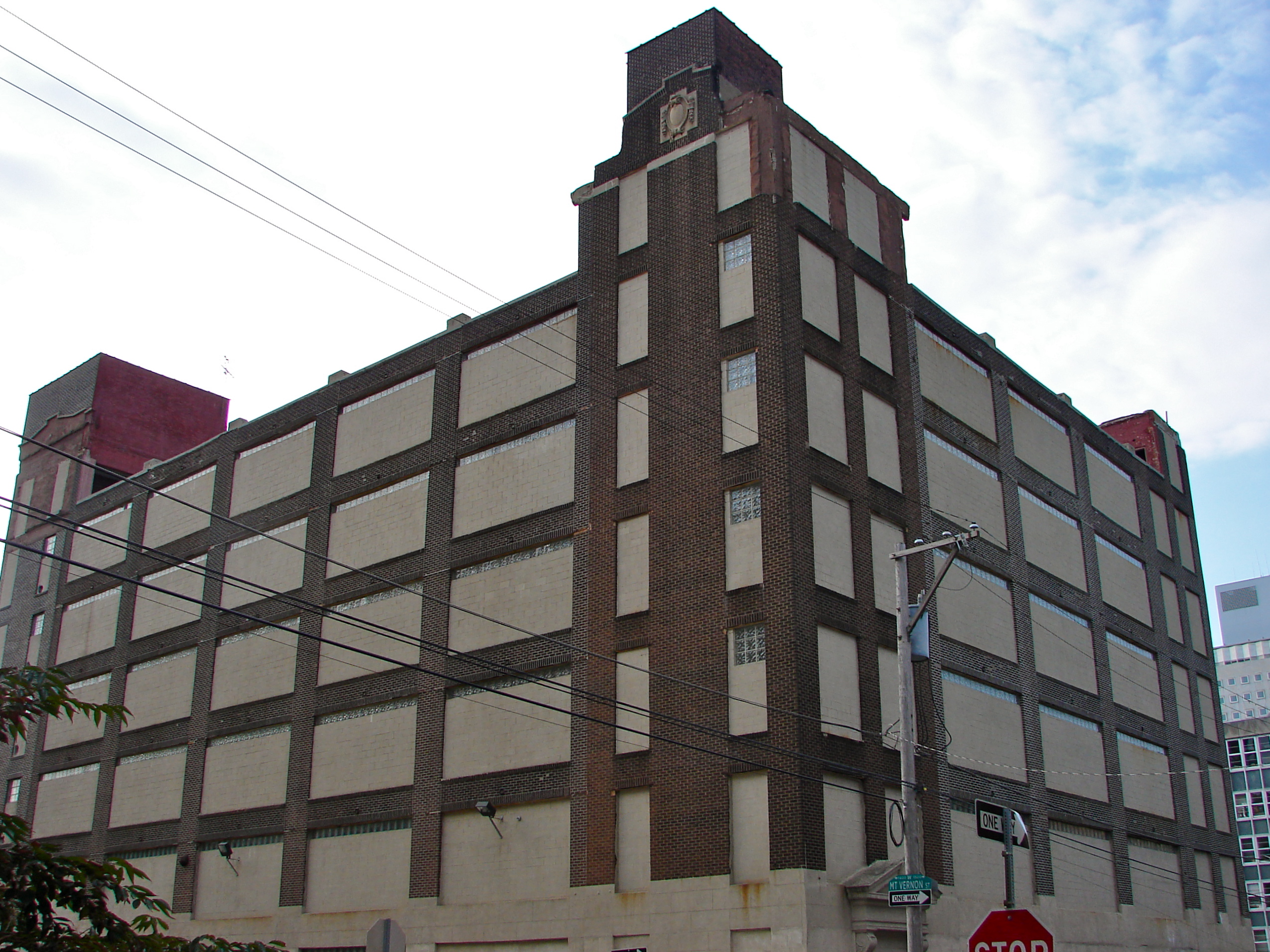
- Biberman Building, August 2010

- Location within Philadelphia Location within Pennsylvania Location within the United States
- Location: 611-619 N. 15th St., Philadelphia, Pennsylvania
- Coordinates: 39°57′53″N 75°9′46″W
- Area: 0 acres (0 ha)
- Built: 1919-1920
- Architect: Rothschild, Leroy
- Architectural style: Classical Revival
- NRHP reference No.: 07000951
- Added to NRHP: September 14, 2007

The Biberman Building is an historic factory building in the Spring Garden neighborhood of Philadelphia, Pennsylvania, US.

It was added to the National Register of Historic Places in 2007.

== History and architectural features ==
Built between 1919 and 1920, using a commercial style that was characteristic of the designs of LeRoy Rothschild, this historic structure is a six-story, reinforced concrete building that was faced in brick and limestone. It housed the Biberman Brothers, Co., a women's dress manufacturer, into the 1970s and features a Classical Revival-style entrance. The primary elevation, which faces North 15th Street, is eight bays wide. A seventh floor was removed in 1975.
