= Allegheny West, Philadelphia =

Allegheny West
- Neighborhood
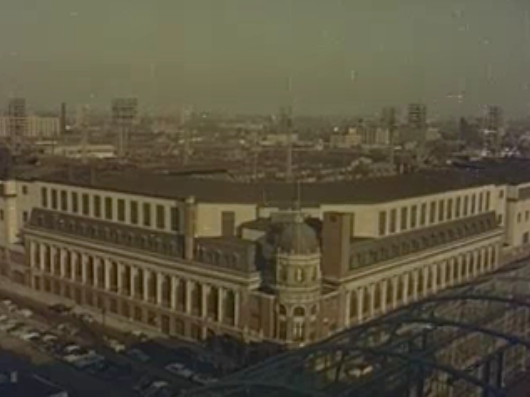
- Shibe Park in Philadelphia's Swampoodle Neighborhood, is now a part of Allegheny West, circa 1955.

- Location within Philadelphia
- Country: United States
- State: Pennsylvania
- County: Philadelphia
- City: Philadelphia
- Area codes: 215, 267, and 445

Allegheny West is a neighborhood in the North Philadelphia section of Philadelphia, Pennsylvania, United States. It is named after its location in the vicinity of Allegheny Avenue on the western side of Broad Street.

Like many neighborhoods in North Philadelphia, Allegheny West has suffered post-industrial decline and disinvestment. It faced one of the largest population losses of any neighborhood in Philadelphia between the 1990 and 2000 census. Vacant industrial sites, such as those once used to build commuter rail trains by Budd Steel (later obtained by Krupp), have in recent years been used in film productions. The former Tasty Baking Co. food production facility is undergoing renovation as a mixed-use site; The former headquarters has been leveled to make way for a 75000 sq. ft grocery-anchored outlet mall.

Housing in Allegheny West is very affordable. In 2005, the 19132 zip code, which contains sections of Allegheny West and North Central, had a median home sale price of $26,450. This was the lowest median price of any zip code in Philadelphia. Housing appreciated by 9% between 2004 and 2005. Allegheny West, per modern definition of the area, also contains sections of the 19129 zip code which is disputably East Falls.

== Population ==
As of 2010, Allegheny West was 97.5% African American, 0.8% Hispanic, 0.7% white, 0.2% Asian, and 0.8% mixed.

== Swampoodle ==
An older neighborhood name formerly in use within the Allegheny West area was Swampoodle. The name is now archaic, although SEPTA's proposed Swampoodle Connection was named for it as recently as the 1980s. Finkel defines Swampoodle as "Junction of three railroad lines, vic. [vicinity] Lehigh Avenue and 22nd Streets." He gives "(before 1926)" as the time period during which the name is attested in the sources that he and his contributors consulted. The Philadelphia Information Locator Service list, augmented from the Finkel 1995 list, repeats the same definition. However, the junction of three railroads to which they refer would apparently be the junction at North Philadelphia station, which clearly has been well east of 22nd Street since the 1890s or earlier. Perhaps Swampoodle extended throughout the entire area between North Philadelphia station and 22nd Street.

== Bibliography ==
- Finkel, Kenneth, ed. (1995). Philadelphia Almanac and Citizens' Manual (1995 ed.). Philadelphia: Library Company of Philadelphia. pp. 156–170. ISBN 0-914076-89-2.
- Philadelphia Information Locator Service (May 20, 1998). "Philadelphia Neighborhoods and Place Names (based on Finkel 1995:156-170.)". City of Philadelphia. Archived from the original on May 23, 2007.
