= North Central Philadelphia =

North Central
- Neighborhood of Philadelphia
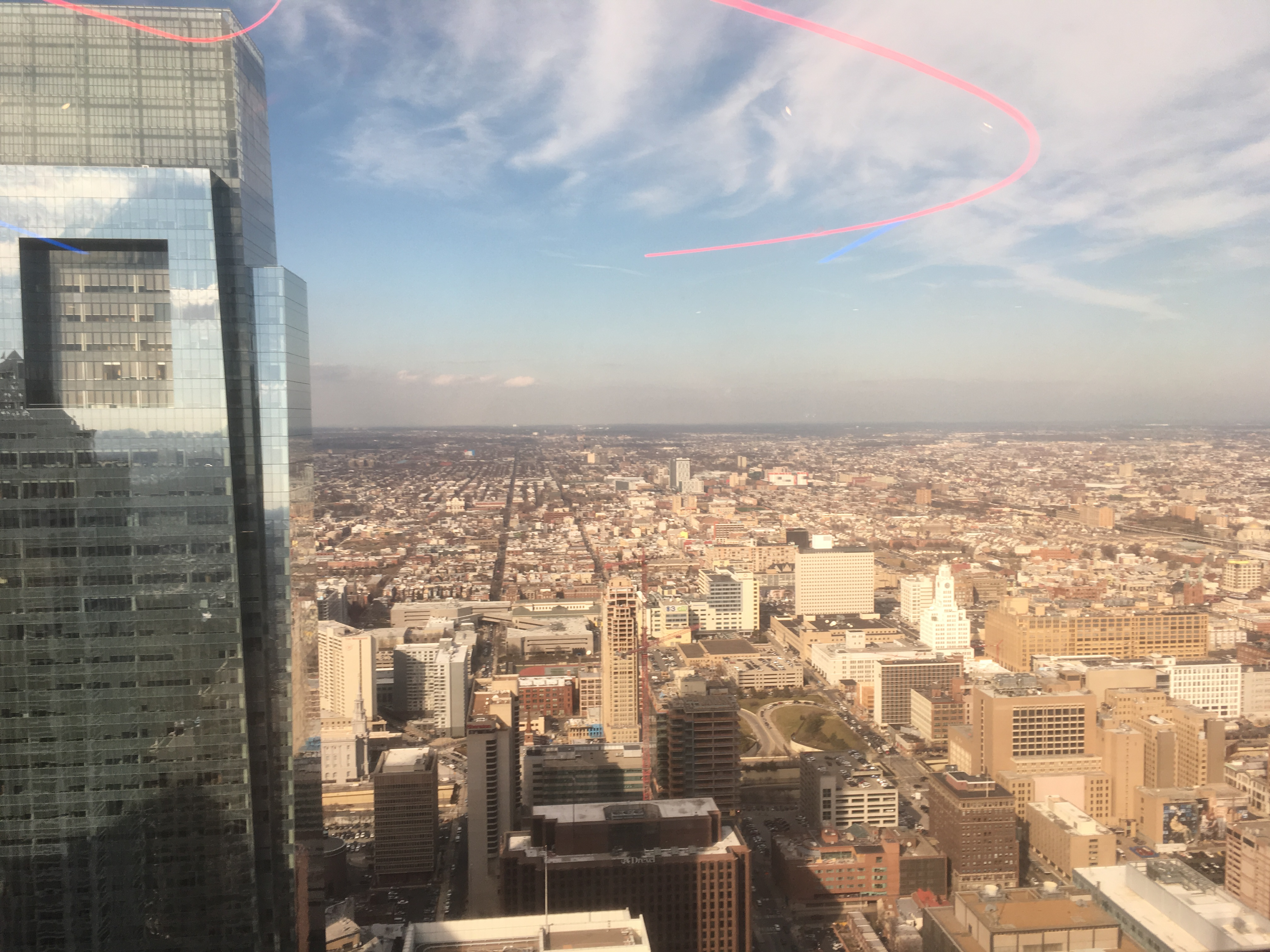

- Location within Philadelphia
- Country: United States
- State: Pennsylvania
- County: Philadelphia
- City: Philadelphia
- Area codes: 215, 267 and 445

North Central is an area in the North Philadelphia section of Philadelphia, Pennsylvania, United States. The name of the area is derived from its location, near the center of North Philadelphia. According to Census 2010, North Central is primarily a low-income neighborhood where 60% of its residents are African American and 40% are Puerto Rican. Hartranft and Stanton are neighborhoods locally known as "North Central". North Central borders both North Philadelphia East and North Philadelphia West.

== Education ==
School District of Philadelphia operates public schools.

The Free Library of Philadelphia Lillian Marrero Branch serves West Kensington.
