= William Steele & Sons Company =

The William Steele & Sons Company was an architectural firm that was located in Philadelphia, Pennsylvania.

== History ==
William Steele (1839–1908) emigrated to the United States in 1846; by 1864, he was a carpenter and house builder in North Philadelphia, Pennsylvania. By 1881, he and his son, Joseph M. Steele, had formed a small business that, by 1886, was known as "William Steele & Son, Carpenters and Builders." The "Son" was pluralized after John Lyle Steele joined the firm in 1900; the term "Company" was added to the firm's name by 1908.

The architects of William Steele & Sons Company designed multiple notable corporate and industrial buildings in the Greater Philadelphia area.

Several of their works are listed on the National Register of Historic Places, including the:

- Lee Tire and Rubber Company (1909), 1100 Hector Street, Whitemarsh (a Philadelphia suburb) (Steele, William), NRHP-listed
- Drueding Brothers Company Building, 437-441 West Master Street, Philadelphia (William Steele & Sons), NRHP-listed
- Steel Heddle Manufacturing Company Complex (1919), 2100 West Allegheny Avenue, Philadelphia (William Steele & Sons Co.), NRHP-listed
- Terminal Commerce Building, 401 North Broad Street, Philadelphia (William Steele & Sons Co.), NRHP-listed
- N. Snellenburg Company Department Store Warehouse, 1825-1851 North 10th Street, Philadelphia (William Steele and Sons Company), NRHP-listed
- General Electric Switchgear Plant, Seventh and Willow Streets, Philadelphia (William Steele & Co.), NRHP-listed
- Harris Building, 2121-41 Market Street, Philadelphia (William Steele & Sons Company), NRHP-listed
- Snellenburg's Clothing Factory, 642 North Broad Street, Philadelphia (William Steele Co.), NRHP-listed
- Quaker City Dye Works, 100-118 West Oxford Street, Philadelphia (William Steele & Sons), NRHP-listed
