= Lit Brothers =

- Lit Brothers Department Store
- U.S. National Register of Historic Places
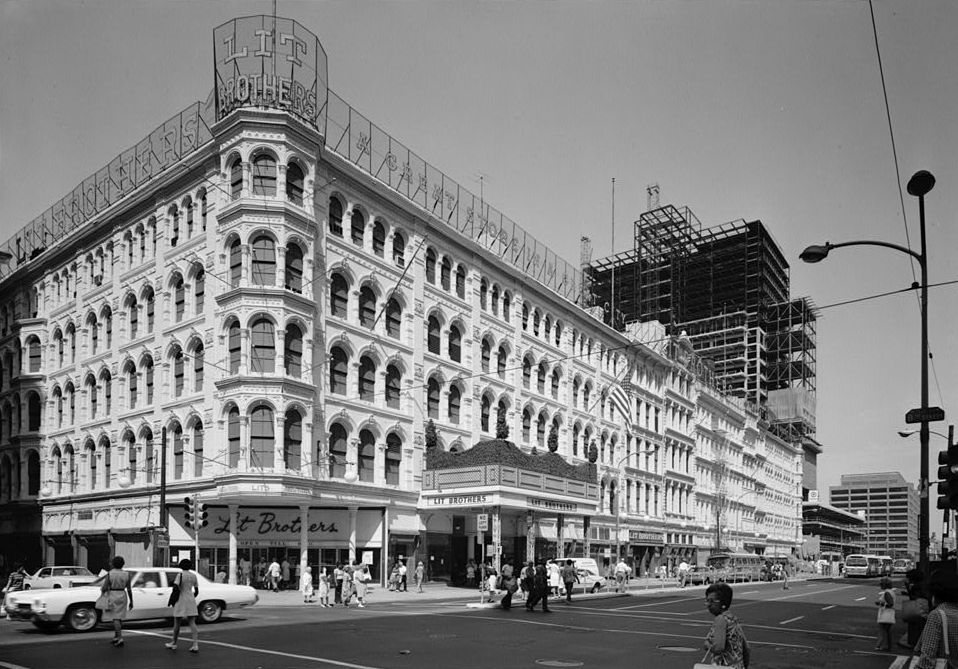
- HABS, 1972–73

- Location within Philadelphia Location within Pennsylvania Location within the United States
- Location: Market between N. 7th and 8th streets Philadelphia, Pennsylvania
- Coordinates: 39°57′8″N 75°9′10″W
- Built: 1859–1918
- Architect: Collins & Autenreith; Simon & Bassett
- Architectural style: Renaissance revival
- NRHP reference No.: 79002322
- Added to NRHP: May 15, 1979

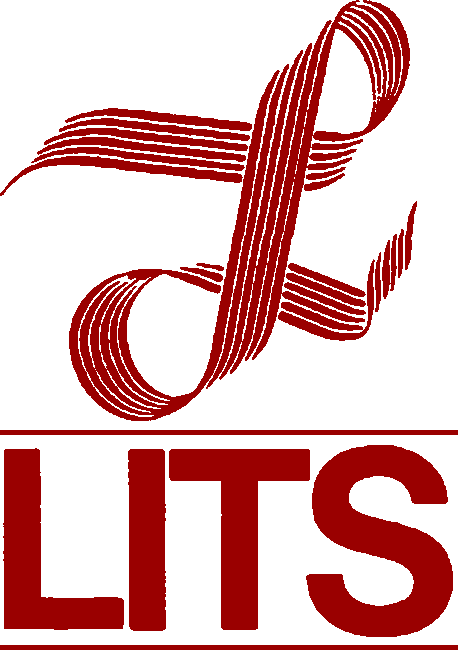
Lits department store final logo

Lit Brothers was a moderately-priced department store based in Philadelphia. Samuel and Jacob Lit opened the first store at Market and N. 8th streets in 1891. Lits positioned itself well as a more affordable alternate to its upscale competitors Strawbridge and Clothier, John Wanamaker, and Gimbels. The store's slogan was "A Great Store in A Great City," and it was noted for its millinery department.

The Lit Brother Store building was added to the National Register of Historic Places in 1979, and is located in the East Center City Commercial Historic District.

== History ==
=== 19th century ===
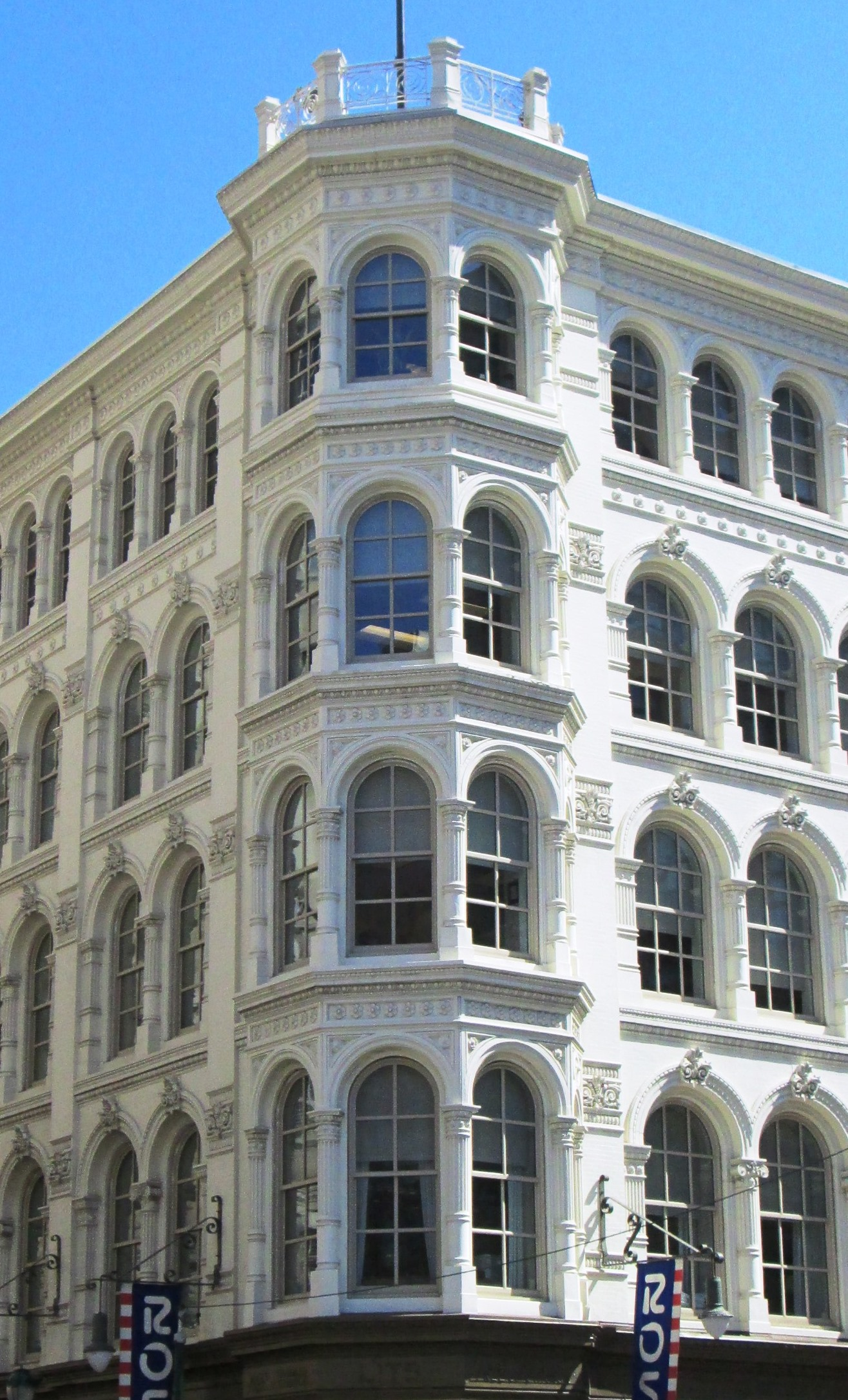
The octagonal tower on the west end of the building in 2013

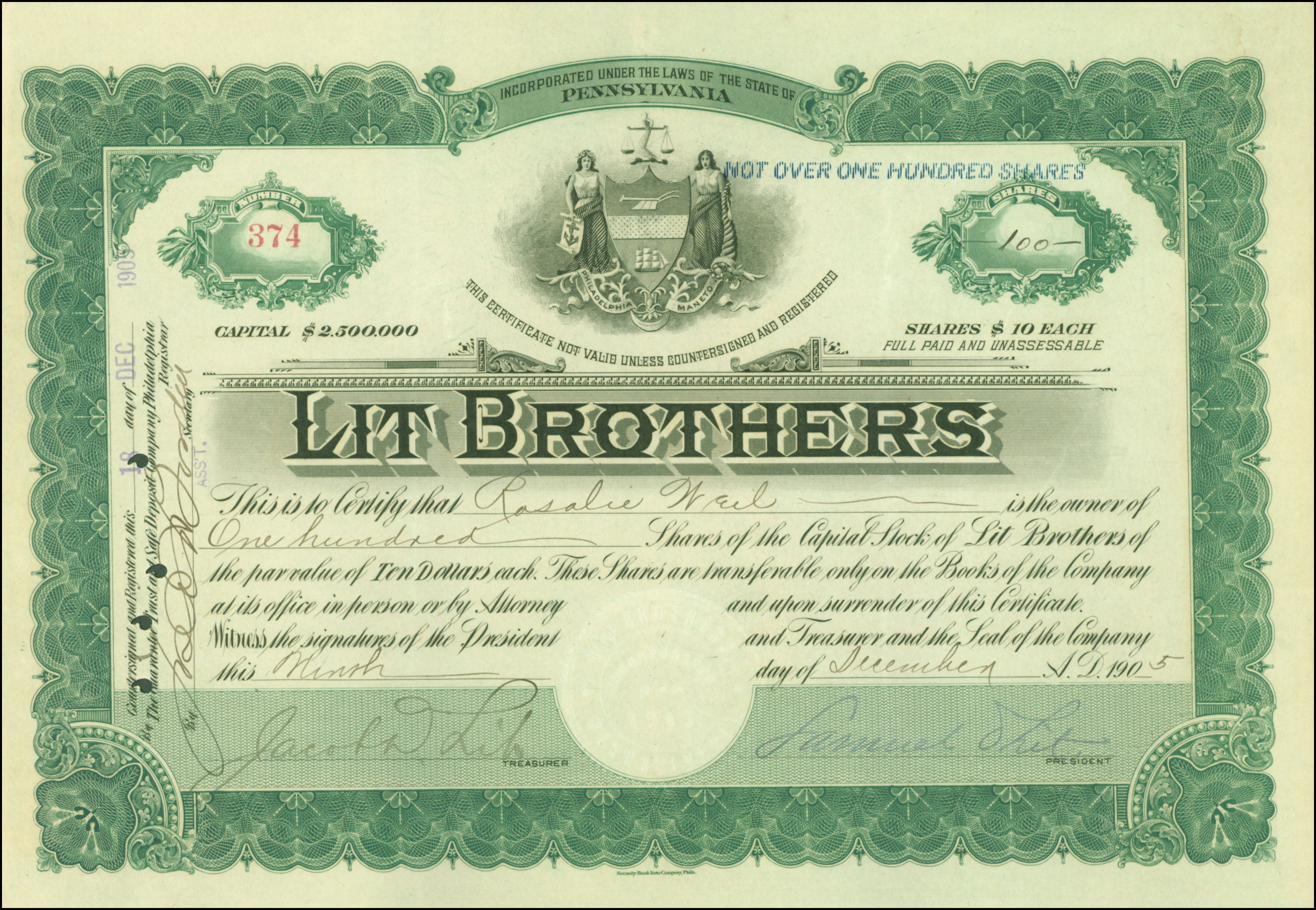
A Lit Brothers company share certificate, issued December 9, 1905

In 1891, Rachel P. Lit (1858-1919, later surnamed Weddel, still later Arnold) opened a women's clothing shop on the corner of Market and N. 8th Streets. With the administration and innovative advertising techniques of her brothers, Colonel Samuel David Lit (1859-1929) and Jacob David Lit (1872-1950), their small store soon became one of the largest retail stores in Philadelphia.

From 1895 to 1907, the store continued to expand, with the company taking over the remaining buildings on the North side of the block on Market between 7th and 8th Streets, including the J. M. Maris Dry Goods Store, the Bailey Store, and the J. B. Lippincott publishing house, and adding new buildings on the corners at either end of the block designed to blend in with the existing buildings.

=== 20th century ===
With alterations and additions, the Lit Brothers Store became the only full block of Victorian architecture in Philadelphia, composed of 33 buildings constructed between 1859 and 1918, with a common interior. The new buildings and the alterations were designed by Charles M. Autenrieth and Edward Collins.

Although the store on Market Street was often called the "cast-iron building", only two of original building's facades at 719-721 Market and 714-718 Arch Street are cast iron. The other buildings are brick, faced with marble or granite. The two end buildings are brick and terra-cotta, with galvanized iron trim and octagonal towers. The uniformity of the entire Renaissance Revival-style facade is supported by the use of a classical arch window in all of the buildings, which are painted the same color.

The company was purchased in 1928 by Albert M. Greenfield's Bankers Securities Corporation and was eventually merged into its City Stores Company – now CSS Industries, Inc. – a retail holding company consisting of stores located in urban centers throughout the south and east, such as the W & J Sloane furniture store, and the Washington, D.C.–based department store chain Lansburgh's. In 1962, they purchased the suburban locations of Snellenburg's, another Philadelphia department store chain owned by Bankers Securities Corporation, which was closed in 1963. The Lit Brothers chain closed in 1977.

=== Enchanted Colonial Village ===
Lits joined its fellow Center City department stores in presenting a Christmas season exhibit when, in 1962, it opened the Enchanted Colonial Village. The Village, designed by Philadelphia display designer Thomas Comerford, cost approximately $1 million (equivalent to $11 million in 2025). It was built by German toy manufacturer Christian Hofmann of Bad Rodach, West Germany. This room-by-room display of a colonial-era Christmas ran each year from Thanksgiving to New Year's Eve, and remained until the final Christmas season in 1976.

The exhibit itself was bought from liquidators for $35,000 by the Sun Oil Company, who later donated it to the Atwater Kent Museum. It has since been restored, and since 2001 sections are displayed around the holiday season at the Please Touch Museum. The Please Touch Museum donated the entire Lit Brothers Enchanted Colonial Village to the American Treasure Tour Museum in Oaks, Pennsylvania. As of December 2019, the American Treasure Tour Museum is in the process of rebuilding the entire display and featuring it as a permanent part of their collection.

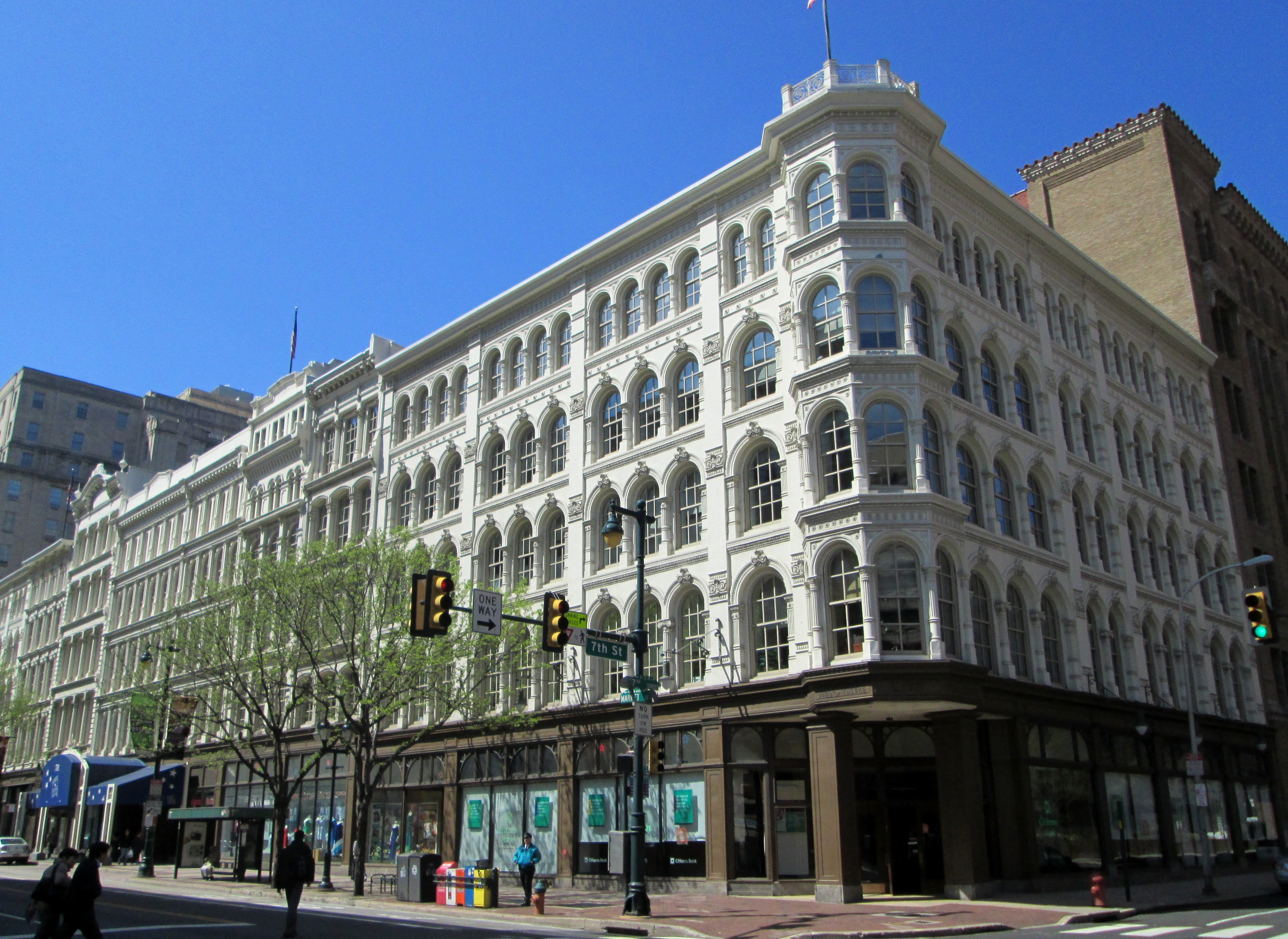
The former Lit Brothers Building, looking west down Market Street from 7th Street in 2013

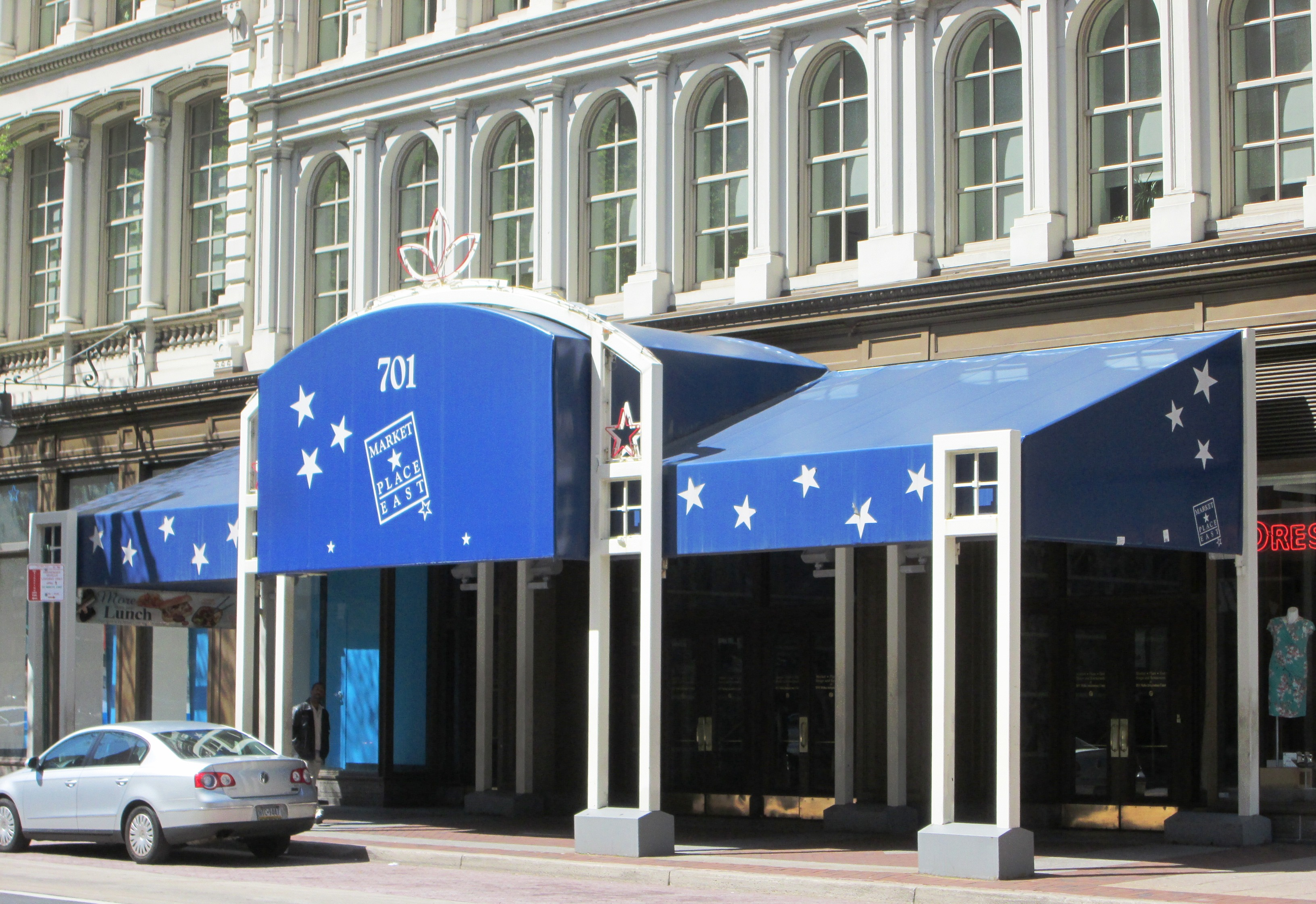
The entrance to Market Place East in 2013

=== Growth and competition ===
Lits saw the growing demand for suburban locations, and started building stores in mall locations around the greater Philadelphia market, including southern New Jersey. Lits also operated a store in nearby downtown Camden, and Lits was the only one of Philadelphia's department stores to maintain a branch along the New Jersey Shore, when it acquired the Blatt Department Store in downtown Atlantic City, and re-branded this location as Lits. Additional suburban locations were added with the acquisition of Snellenburg's in 1962.

Faced with growing competition in a changing retail landscape, Lit Brothers closed in April 1977.

== Suburban branch stores ==
Prominent suburban branch stores in the Philadelphia area included Bensalem, Pennsylvania, Plymouth Meeting, Pennsylvania, Willow Grove, Pennsylvania, Wyomissing, Pennsylvania, and Voorhees Township, New Jersey.

== Repurposing of flagship store ==
After the chain closed in 1977, the full-block flagship store was vacant until the late 1980s. In November 1985, Mellon Bank committed to a 25-year lease for half of the building's space. The building was redeveloped as office and commercial space by Growth Properties. The project was designed by Burt Hill Kosar Rittelmann Associates and John Milner Associates. The building reopened in 1987 as Mellon Independence Center, named after its principal occupant, the regional headquarters for Mellon Bank, and featured retail stores on the street level, and a food court on the lower level.

The historic 720,000-square-foot (67,000 m^{2}) building was put on the market in 2007, with an asking price of $70 million (~$102 million in 2024). The main entrance, addressed as 701 Market Street, carried the name Market Place East, but was renamed the Lits Building in June 2013. Five Below moved their headquarters to the Lits Building in 2018.

As of 2020, a Lit Brothers neon sign labels the main entrance. The sign reading "Hats Trimmed Free of Charge" can still be seen today on the façade of the redeveloped flagship building.
