= Belgravia Hotel =

Historic place in Pennsylvania, United States

- U.S. National Register of Historic Places
- Philadelphia Register of Historic Places
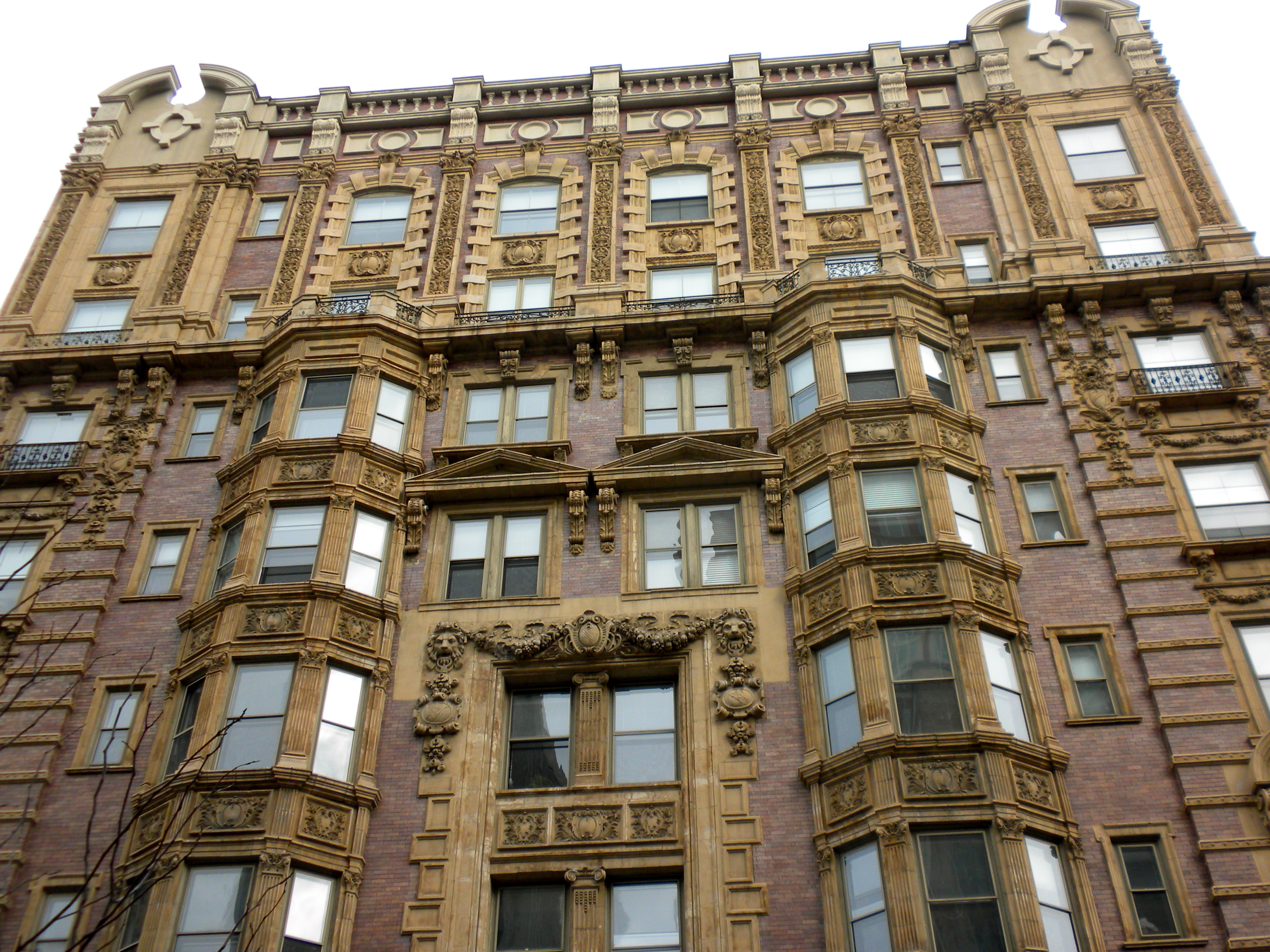

- Location within Philadelphia Location within Pennsylvania Location within the United States
- Location: 1811 Chestnut St., Philadelphia, Pennsylvania, U.S.
- Coordinates: 39°57′7″N 75°10′17″W
- Area: 0.3 acres (0.12 ha)
- Built: 1902
- Architect: Fredrick Milligan and Samuel Webber
- Architectural style: Beaux Arts
- NRHP reference No.: 82001543
- Added to NRHP: November 14, 1982

The Belgravia Hotel, also known as Peale House, is a historic building in Philadelphia, Pennsylvania.

It was added to the National Register of Historic Places in 1982. It was listed on the Philadelphia Register of Historic Places on June 3, 1982.

The building was formerly the site of a hotel but has been developed into condominiums.

Famous former residents include violist William Primrose and violinist Efrem Zimbalist.
