= N. Snellenburg & Company =

American manufacturer and retailer

- Industry: retail
- Founded: 1869
- Defunct: 1962
- Fate: Acquired by Lit Brothers
- Headquarters: Philadelphia, Pennsylvania
- Products: clothing
- Number of employees: 3,000
- Parent: Bankers Securities Corporation
- N. Snellenburg Company Department Store Warehouse
- U.S. National Register of Historic Places
- Location within Philadelphia Location within Pennsylvania Location within the United States
- Location: 1825-1851 N. 10th St., Philadelphia, Pennsylvania
- Coordinates: 39°58′49″N 75°09′01″W
- Area: 1.5 acres (0.61 ha)
- Built: 1914
- Architect: William Steele and Sons Company
- Architectural style: Early Republic
- NRHP reference No.: 03000725
- Added to NRHP: July 31, 2003

N. Snellenburg & Company, commonly known as Snellenburg's, was a Philadelphia, Pennsylvania-based middle-class department store and wholesale clothing manufacturer, established in 1869. The company became the largest clothing manufacturer in the world and at one time employed 3,000. The company sold directly from the workroom to the wearer, allowing clothing to be sold for lower prices. Its slogan was "The Thrifty Store for Thrifty People." In about 1952, the company was acquired by Bankers Securities Corporation, owned by Albert M. Greenfield, but remained family-run until its closure in 1962. Suburban locations were then acquired by Lit Brothers.

== Flagship store and factory ==
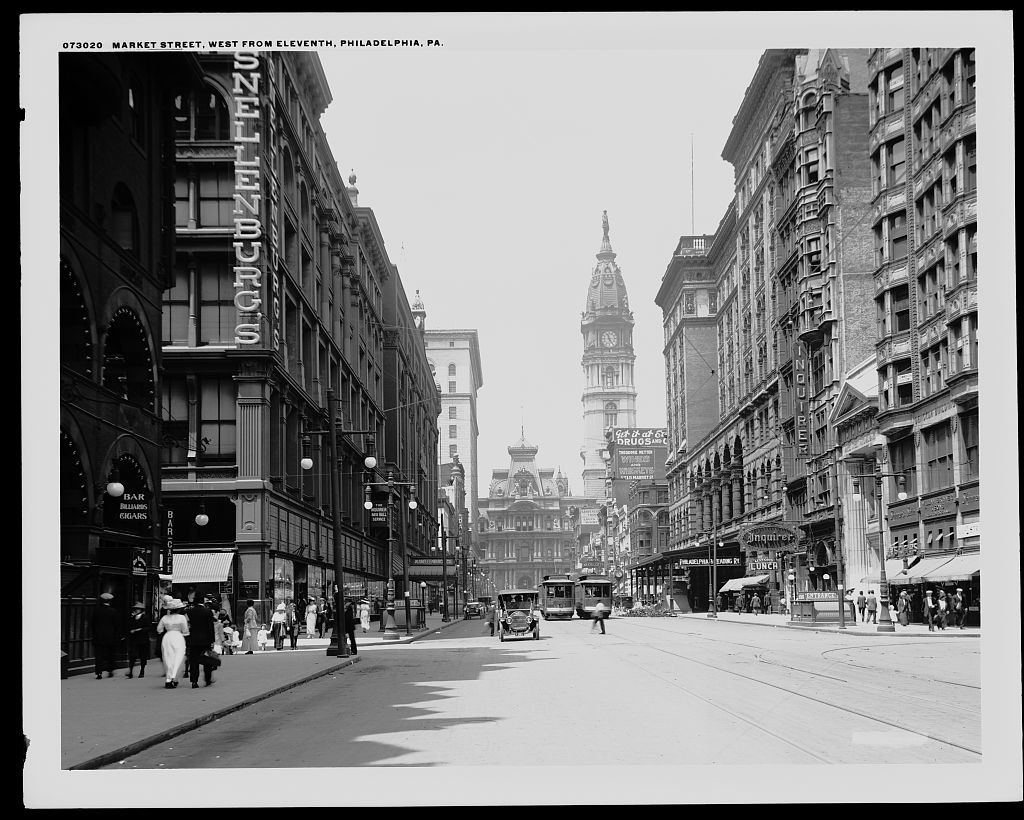
Snellenburg's Department Store, 1100 Market St., Philadelphia, PA (1886-87, demolished), in a c. 1915 photograph.

The company moved from its South Street location, where it was founded in 1869 by Joseph Snellenburg, to fashionable 12th and Market Streets in 1889. The store was at a location known as the "Girard Estate." At that time, the company directors were Nathan Snellenburg, Samuel Snellenburg, Simon L. Bloch, and Joseph J. Snellenburg. The Snellenburg's Clothing Factory, 642 N. Broad St., in Philadelphia, built in 1905, was added to the National Register of Historic Places in 1986. The N. Snellenburg Company Department Store Warehouse, 1825–1851 N. 10th St., in Philadelphia, was built in 1914 and added to the National Register of Historic Places in 2003. In 1965, the men's store annex at 34 South 11th Street, became the first location of Community College of Philadelphia. It still stands and was used by the Family Court of Philadelphia until 2015. The six-story flagship store building at 12th and Market was subsequently cut down to two stories and redeveloped as part of the Reading Terminal project before being completely demolished in 2015.

== Wilmington store ==
In 1895, the company opened a branch location at the corner of Seventh and Market Streets in Wilmington, Delaware. The store manager was David Snellenburg. The Market Street store closed in 1932, a victim of the Great Depression and competition from James T Mullen's down the street. A distributor station at 207 Vandever Ave operated between 1932 and 1938.

== Into the suburbs ==
In October 1953, Snellenburg's opened a suburban store in the Snellenburg Shopping Center, in Willow Grove, Pennsylvania. Another store operated at 24th and Oregon Ave., Philadelphia, and one at Broomall, Pennsylvania at Lawrence Park & Sproul. On October 29, 1960, presidential candidate John F. Kennedy gave remarks from both these locations. A store also operated in downtown Atlantic City, New Jersey at Atlantic & Carolina. When Snellenburg's closed its downtown Philadelphia store in 1962, the suburban locations were sold to Lit Brothers.
