= Wagner Free Institute of Science =

- U.S. National Register of Historic Places
- U.S. National Historic Landmark
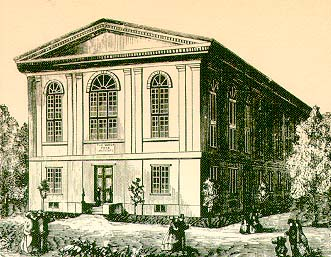

- Location within Philadelphia Location within Pennsylvania Location within the United States
- Location: 1700 West Montgomery Avenue; Philadelphia, Pennsylvania
- Coordinates: 39°58′50″N 75°9′47″W
- Built: 1859-1865
- Architect: John McArthur Jr.; Collins & Autenrieth
- Architectural style: Classical Revival, Renaissance
- Website: www.wagnerfreeinstitute.org
- NRHP reference No.: 89000361

Significant dates
- Added to NRHP: May 17, 1989
- Designated NHL: December 14, 1990

The Wagner Free Institute of Science is a natural history museum at 1700 West Montgomery Avenue in north Philadelphia, Pennsylvania, United States. Founded in 1855, it is a rare surviving example of a Victorian era scientific society, with a museum, research center, library, and educational facilities. Its buildings, developed between 1859 and 1901, present the collections of founder William Wagner in the style of the period, and have been designated a National Historic Landmark for their architecture and state of preservation.

== History ==
The Wagner Free Institute was founded in 1855 by William Wagner, a merchant, philanthropist, and gentleman scientist of the time, who sought to offer free educational courses to all who would seek to learn about the natural world. Wagner began offering free lectures on science at his home, Elm Grove, a colonial farm estate on the outskirts of Philadelphia in 1847. To illustrate the lectures, he drew on a collection of specimens he had gathered since his boyhood. All of the classes were offered with an open admission policy that allowed women as well as men to attend. These lectures became so popular that by 1855 he moved them first to a public hall to accommodate the rapidly growing audience, and later to its permanent home designed by Philadelphia architect John McArthur Jr., who would go on to design Philadelphia's City Hall.

Wagner continued to lecture and to lead the unique institution until his death in 1885. The Board of Trustees then appointed Joseph Leidy, a biologist of international reputation, to head its scientific and educational programs. Leidy's appointment ushered in an active and productive era in which the Institute's mission and programs were greatly expanded. Leidy's most lasting and significant contribution to the Institute was his reorganization of the Institute's museum. He greatly enlarged Wagner's original collection by further field collection, purchases and other acquisitions. Leidy personally developed and supervised their reorganization into a systematic display in which specimens and cases were arranged according to Darwin's theory of evolution, so that visitors moved from simpler to more complex organisms and through geologic time as they walked through the exhibition hall. This new display opened in 1891 and little has been altered since Leidy's time, making the Institute an exceptional example of a Victorian era science museum. In 1892, the first branch of the Philadelphia Public Library, later becoming the Free Library of Philadelphia, opened at the Wagner Institute. The branch remained open until 1962.

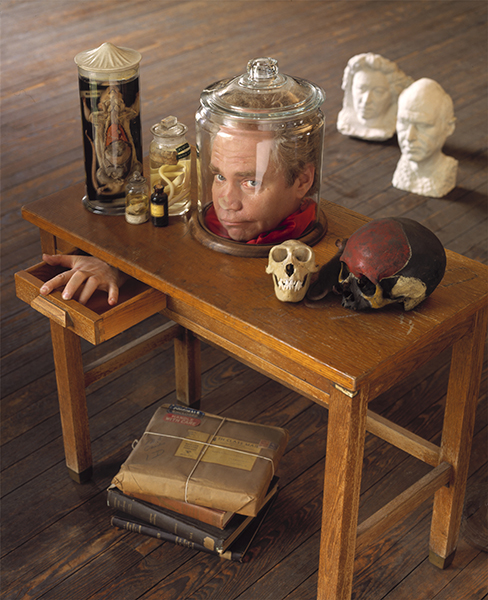
Teller magician in vitro at the Wagner Free Institute of Science

The Institute has continued to carry out Wagner's initial goals of offering free science courses, while also functioning as a library, lecture hall and museum. The museum maintains more than 100,000 specimens, including minerals and fossils collected by Wagner. Today, the Wagner Free Institute of Science is widely recognized as one of Philadelphia's historical treasures. While preserving its historic building and collections for future generations, the Institute also serves as a rich educational resource for programs on science, natural history, and the history of science from the 19th century to the present. The Wagner has received support from the National Endowment for the Humanities to preserve the building and its collection.

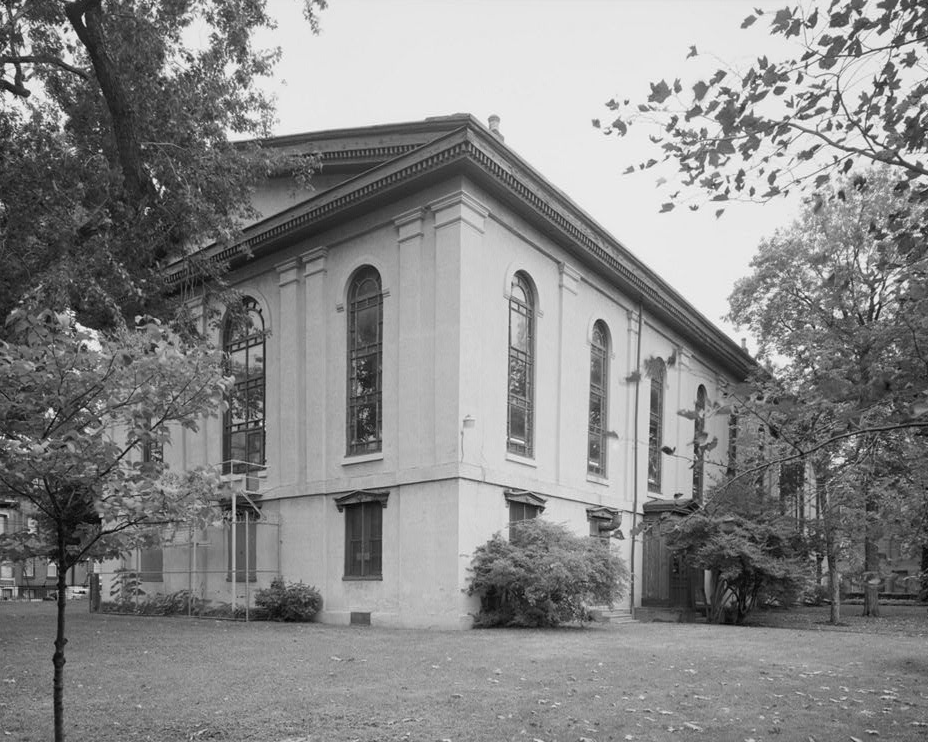
Modern photograph

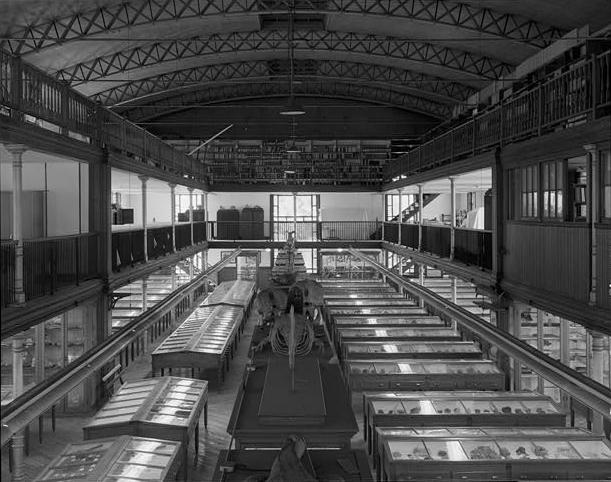
Second-floor Hall and galleries.

== See also ==
- Academy of Natural Sciences
- The Franklin Institute
- Mütter Museum
- List of National Historic Landmarks in Philadelphia
- National Register of Historic Places listings in North Philadelphia
