= Joseph Leidy =

American anatomist and paleontologist (1823-1891)

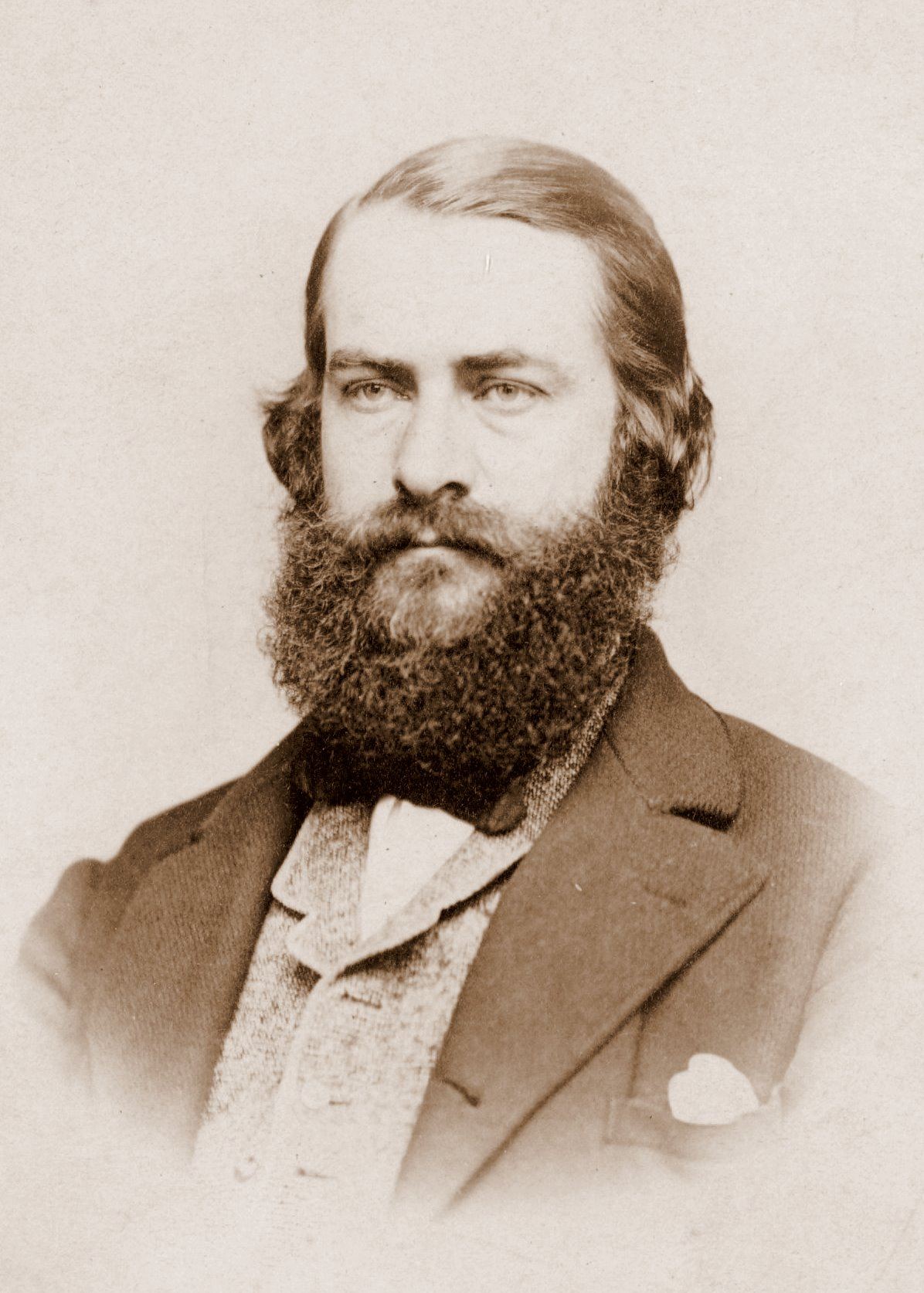
- Leidy, c. 1870
- Born: September 9, 1823; Philadelphia, Pennsylvania, U.S.
- Died: April 30, 1891 (aged 67); Philadelphia, Pennsylvania, U.S.
- Education: University of Pennsylvania
- Awards: Lyell Medal (1884)
- Scientific career
- Fields: paleontology, anatomy, parasitology
- Workplaces: Academy of Natural Sciences; University of Pennsylvania; Wagner Free Institute of Science

Signature
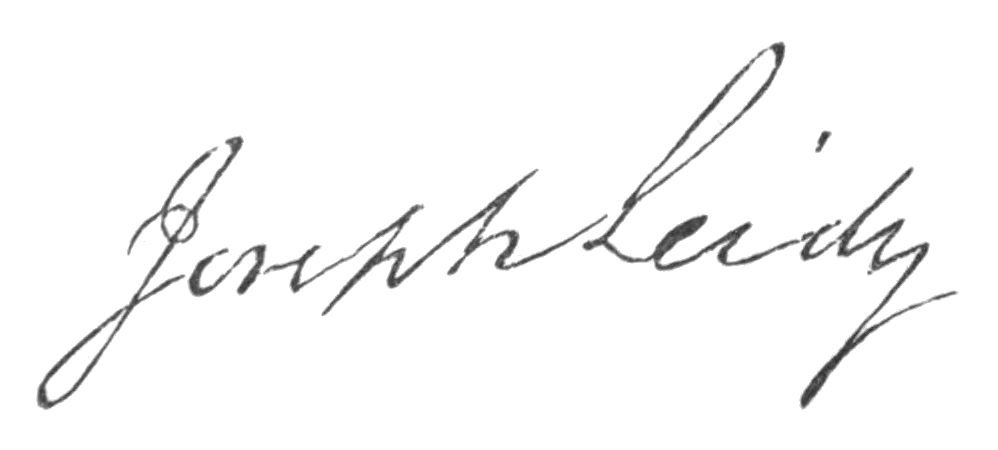

Joseph Mellick Leidy (September 9, 1823 – April 30, 1891) was an American paleontologist, parasitologist, and anatomist.

Leidy was professor of anatomy at the University of Pennsylvania, later becoming a professor of natural history at Swarthmore College and the director of scientific and educational programs at the Wagner Free Institute of Science. His book Extinct Fauna of Dakota and Nebraska, published in 1869, contained many species not previously described and many previously unknown on the North American continent. At the time, scientific investigation was largely the province of wealthy amateurs.

The Leidy Glacier in northwest Greenland was named by Robert Peary after him.

== Early life and education ==
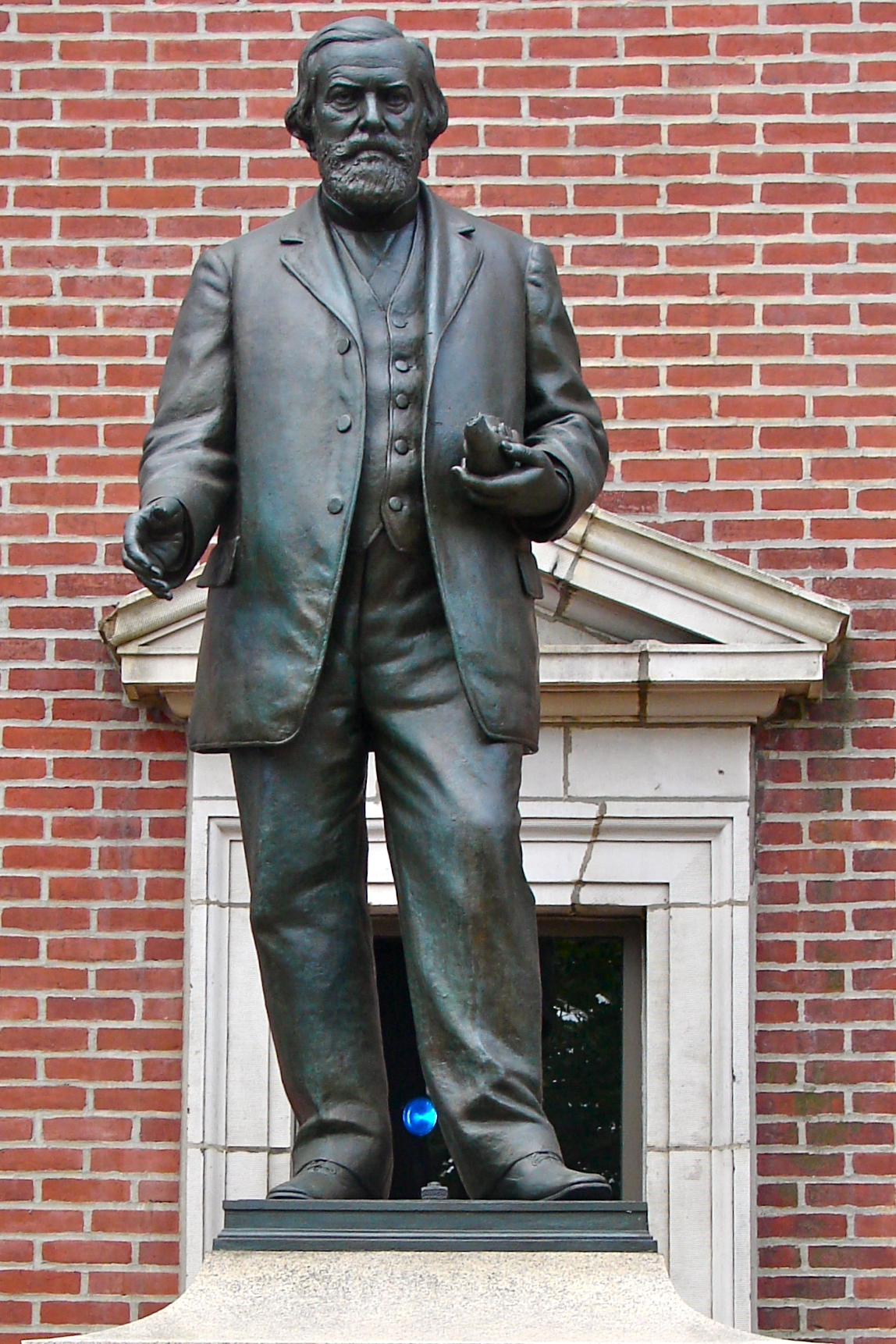
Statue of Joseph Leidy by Samuel Murray

Leidy was born on September 9, 1823, in Philadelphia, to an established Pennsylvania Dutch family. His father, Philip, was a hatter; his mother, Catharine, died during childbirth when he was young. His father then married his wife's first cousin, Christiana Mellick. Leidy also had a brother, Thomas Leidy.

With support from his stepmother and after overcoming the opposition of his father, who wanted him to be a sign painter, Leidy studied medicine at the University of Pennsylvania, where he graduated with his medical degree in 1844.

== Career ==
After receiving his medical degree, Leidy briefly practiced medicine before leaving medicine to pursue teaching and scientific research. In 1845 he was appointed as the librarian of the Academy of Natural Sciences, and the following year, he became its curator, a position he held for the remainder of his life.

In 1849, he was elected a member of the American Philosophical Society.

In 1853, upon the retirement of William Horner, Leidy became professor of anatomy at the University of Pennsylvania, where he taught medical students for 38 years. Leidy was also involved with several other institutions in Philadelphia, including Franklin Medical College and St. Joseph's Hospital. During the American Civil War, Leidy served as a surgeon at Satterlee Military Hospital.

In 1871, Leidy established the Department of Natural History at Swarthmore College, where he taught until 1885. That year, he founded the Department of Biology at the University of Pennsylvania. In 1885, Leidy was elected president of the Wagner Free Institute of Science of Philadelphia.

== Scientific work ==
=== Paleontology ===
Leidy named the holotype specimen of Hadrosaurus foulkii, which was recovered from the marl pits of Haddonfield, New Jersey. It was notable for being the first nearly complete fossilized skeleton of a dinosaur ever recovered. The specimen was originally discovered by William Parker Foulke. Leidy concluded, contrary to the view prevailing at the time, that this dinosaur could adopt a bipedal posture. He also described the holotype specimens of Arctodus (A. pristinus), the dire wolf (Aenocyon dirus), and the American lion (Panthera atrox), among many others.

American fossil collector and paleontologist E. D. Cope was a student of Leidy's, but the enmity and ruthless competition that developed between him and rival paleontologist O. C. Marsh eventually drove Leidy out of western American vertebrate paleontology, a field that Leidy had helped to found. Marsh claimed Leidy contributed to the falling out of the two by showing Cope in the presence of Marsh that Cope had mistakenly placed the head of a fossil Elasmosaurus on the tail, rather than on the neck, and then publishing a correction.

Leidy was an early American supporter of Charles Darwin's theory of evolution, and lobbied successfully for Darwin's election to membership in the Academy of Natural Sciences of Philadelphia.

In 1852, Leidy referred Bison antiquus, the North American fossil bison, to the genus Bison, the first to do so. Sometimes called the "ancient bison", it was the most common large herbivore of the North American continent for over 10,000 years, and is a direct ancestor of the living American bison.

In 1855, Leidy published an influential memoir on fossil ground sloths of North America, the first comprehensive study of North American xenarthrans (the group including sloths, armadillos, glyptodonts, and anteaters). The work expanded understanding of the morphology of species known to the time, including details of the skull, and documented the broad geographic range once inhabited by the common species Megalonyx jeffersonii.

Leidy dominated vertebrate paleontology research in Florida during the latter half of the 19th century. He described and published the newly discovered species Smilodon floridanus.

=== Parasitology and Protozoology ===
Leidy was also a renowned parasitologist, and determined as early as 1846 that trichinosis was caused by a parasite in undercooked meat. He was also a pioneering protozoologist, publishing Fresh-water Rhizopods of North America in 1879 – a work that is still referenced today.

=== Forensic science ===
In 1846, Leidy became the first person to use a microscope to solve a murder mystery. A man accused of killing a Philadelphia farmer had blood on his clothes and hatchet. The suspect claimed the blood was from chickens he had been slaughtering. Using his microscope, Leidy found no nuclei in these erythrocytes (human erythrocytes are anucleate). Moreover, he found that if he let chick erythrocytes remain outside the body for hours, they did not lose their nuclei. Thus, he concluded that the blood stains could not have been chicken blood. The suspect subsequently confessed.

==== The Soap Lady ====
In 1875, a woman's body was exhumed from a Philadelphia cemetery; her body was encased in adipocere. Examining her, Leidy originally reported that she had died in the 1793 Philadelphia yellow fever epidemic, but X-rays taken in 1987 showed that she had buttons on her body that weren't produced until the 1830s. Similarly, the body didn't have teeth, so Leidy thought the woman had died in middle or old age; however, a new set of X-rays in 2007 suggested that the woman had died in her late 20s.

== Wagner Free Institute ==
After William Wagner's death in 1885, the Wagner Free Institute of Science formed a board of trustees to find a new director. They chose Leidy to lead the institute, and he became president of the institute's faculty and curator of the museum. He held this position while remaining curator at the Academy of Natural Sciences and professor at Penn. Under Leidy's direction, the Wagner became a more professional institution for research and education. He formed the institute's professional journal "Transactions of the Wagner Free Institute of Science" and sponsored expeditions to collect specimens.

One famed expedition to western Florida led by Angelo Heilprin led to the first discovery of a saber-toothed cat in North America. Leidy also led a large renovation to the building and dramatically reorganized the collection. The exhibition he designed opened in 1891, and displayed specimens based on taxonomy and systematics. Today, the Victorian cases and hand-labelled specimens remain almost unaltered since Leidy's reorganization in the late 19th century.

=== Other scientific fields ===
Leidy collected gems and fossils, and donated his important collection of the former to the Smithsonian before he died. At Swarthmore, he also taught a class on mineralogy and geology.

Leidy was elected as the founding president of the Association of American Anatomists in 1888.

== Personal life ==
He married Anna Harden, a woman who took a serious interest in his work and helped him with it on occasion. Their marriage was childless, and they eventually adopted an orphaned seven-year-old girl, Alwinia, daughter of the late Professor Franks of the University of Pennsylvania.

== Death ==
Leidy died in his home in Philadelphia, on April 30, 1891. After his death, his brain was donated to the American Anthropometric Society. In 1907, Edward Anthony Spitzka published a paper of his analysis of six brains at the American Anthropometric Society, including Leidy's.

== Bibliography ==
His bibliography includes 553 works.
