= Bankers Securities Corporation =

U.S. investment company

- Company type: Private company
- Industry: Investments
- Founded: 1927; 98 years ago
- Defunct: Unknown
- Fate: Closed
- Headquarters: Philadelphia, Pennsylvania, United States
- Area served: Pennsylvania
- Key people: Albert M. Greenfield

Bankers Securities Corporation (BSC) was an American Philadelphia, Pennsylvania-based investment company formed in 1927, by Albert M. Greenfield for general investment banking and trading in securities. It eventually became the parent company for virtually all of Greenfield's financial interests.

== History ==
BSC bought control of Lit Brothers department store, then subsequently sold it to City Stores Company. On December 1, 1931, City Stores Company could no longer meet its financial obligation to BSC and Greenfield took control of City Stores. Greenfield was now a retail magnate.

BSC bought other stores outside the City Stores umbrella including: N. Snellenburg & Company; Bonwit Teller & Company; Tiffany & Co.; and Loft Candy Corporation. The Greenfield BSC empire also included a number of Philadelphia based hotels including the Bellevue-Stratford, Benjamin Franklin, Sylvania, Adelphia, Essex, John Bartram and the Ritz-Carlton in Philadelphia and Atlantic City, New Jersey.

Greenfield resigned as chairman of BSC in March 1959, and was succeeded by Gustave G. Amsterdam.
