= Charles M. Autenrieth =

American architect (1828–1906)

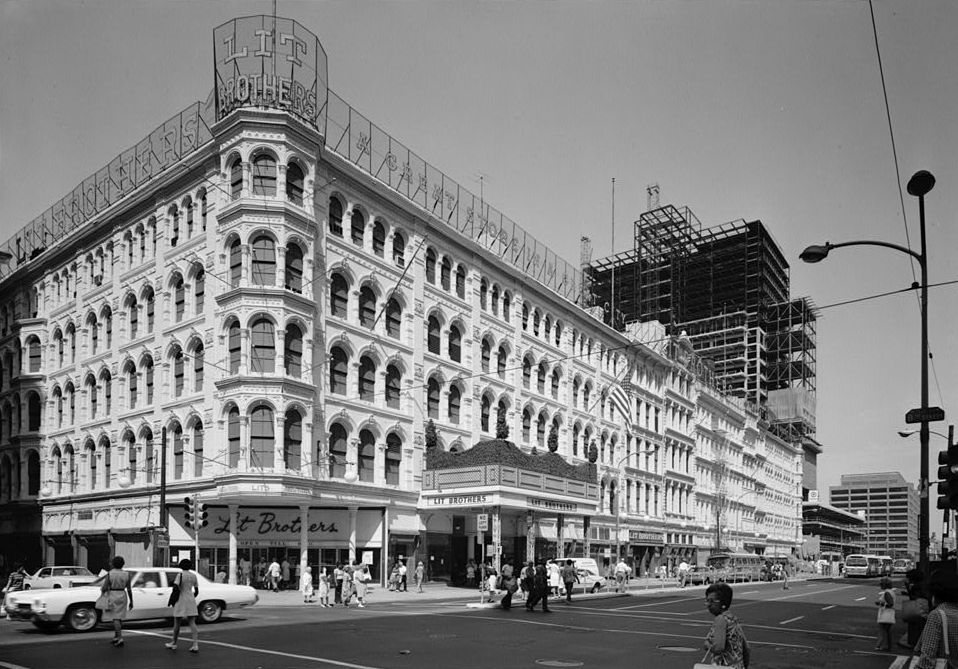
Lit Brothers Department Store, 701-39 Market Street, Philadelphia (1893-1907).

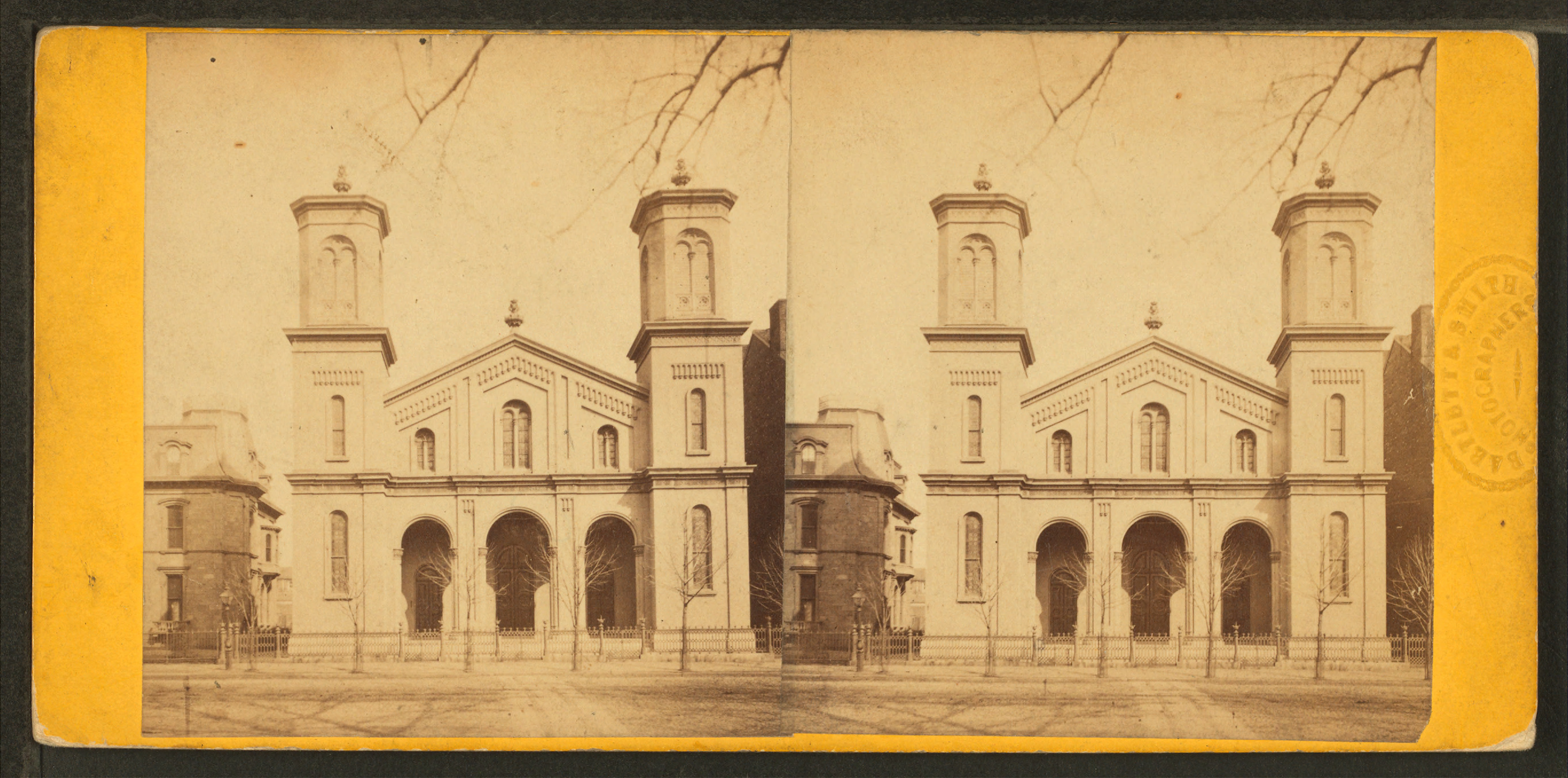
Central Presbyterian Church, 704-14 N. Broad Street, Philadelphia (1877).

Charles M. Autenrieth (1828–1906) was an American architect whose practice was centered in Philadelphia. From 1852 to 1902, he was in partnership with Edward Collins, and thereafter with his son, Charles M. Autenrieth Jr.

Autenrieth was born in Wurtenburg, Germany, and came to the United States in 1849. He found positions first with Philadelphia architect Samuel Sloan, and then John McArthur Jr. In 1852, entered into a partnership with fellow German immigrant Edward Collins (1821-1902).

The architectural firm of Collins & Autenrieth designed buildings for both private individuals and civic institutions. The Lea family served as clients for many commissions.

Collins & Autenrieth designed the first store for Lit Brothers at 735-39 Market Street (NE corner 8th & Market) in 1893. As the store grew, they expanded it into 731-33 Market (1895), 723-29 Market (1896), and, at the other end of the block, 701-07 Market (1907).

Much of Collins & Autenrieth's work centered upon Philadelphia's German immigrant community.

At least two of Collins & Autenrieth's works are listed on the U.S. National Register of Historic Places.

== Architectural Work - Partial Listing ==
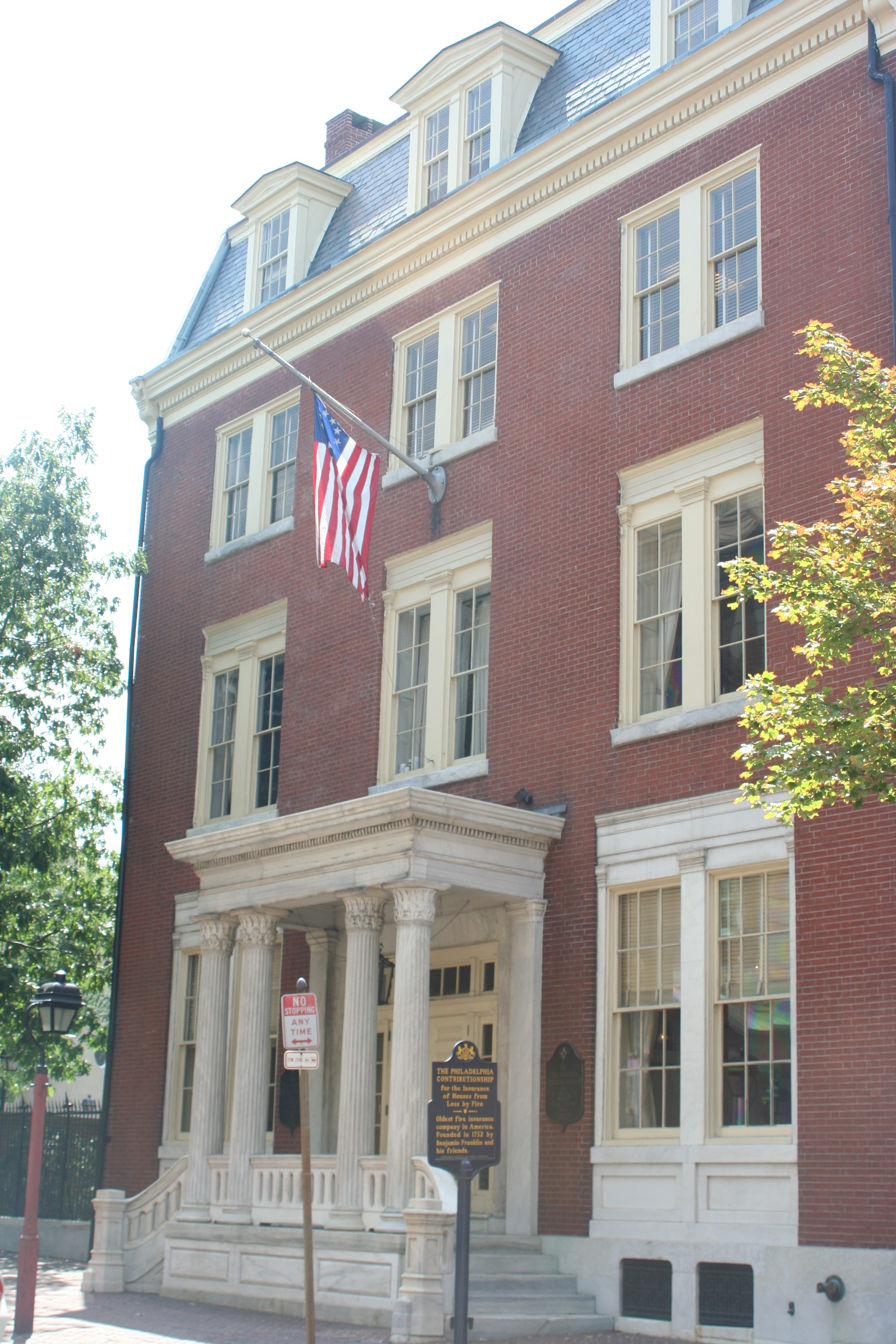
Philadelphia Contributionship, Philadelphia. Collins & Autenrieth added the marble porch and the mansard roof, 1866-67.

=== Philadelphia buildings ===
- Alterations to Philadelphia Contributionship, 210-16 South 4th Street, Philadelphia - 1866-67.
- Central Presbyterian Church, 704-14 North Broad Street, Philadelphia - 1877. Now Greater Exodus Baptist Church.
- Alterations to Wagner Free Institute of Science, 1700 West Montgomery Avenue, Philadelphia - circa 1885
- Residence for Henry Charles Lea, 704 Sansom Street, Philadelphia - 1890.
- Lit Brothers Department Store, 701-39 Market Street, Philadelphia - 1893-1907, (Collins & Autenrieth), NRHP-listed
- Wagner Free Institute of Science, 17th Street and Montgomery Avenue. Philadelphia (Collins & Autenrieth), NRHP-listed

=== Demolished/unbuilt buildings ===
- Design competition for Academy of Music - 1854 (not built).
- Design competition for Masonic Temple - 1867 (not built).
- Design competition for Machinery Hall, Centennial Exposition - 1876 (not built). Awarded First Prize of $4000.
- Design competition for Library Company of Philadelphia - 1879 (not built).
- Alterations to Philadelphia and Reading Railroad Company Offices, 227 South 4th Street, Philadelphia - 1871 (demolished).
- "Rylston" Residence for Charles M. Lea, Paper Mill Road, Wyndmoor, Pennsylvania - 1886 (demolished).
- Alterations to Library Company of Philadelphia, Juniper & Locust Streets, Philadelphia - 1890 (demolished).
- Lea Institute of Hygiene (Smith Hall), University of Pennsylvania, South 34th Street, Philadelphia - 1891 (demolished 1995).
- Alterations to Penn Mutual Life Insurance Co. Building, 3rd & Chestnut Streets, Philadelphia (demolished).
