= William Wagner (philanthropist) =

American scientist, philanthropist, and merchant (1796–1885)

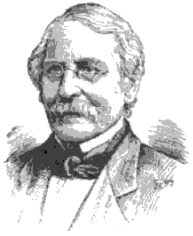

Personal details
- Born: January 15, 1796 Philadelphia, Pennsylvania
- Died: January 17, 1885 (aged 89) Philadelphia, Pennsylvania

William Wagner (1796–1885) was a gentleman scientist, philanthropist, and merchant from Pennsylvania who founded the Wagner Free Institute of Science.

== Early life ==
Wagner was born in Philadelphia on January 15, 1796. From a young age, he aspired to be a scientist.

== Career ==
In 1814, Wagner became a counting house clerk and in 1817-18 served as a supercargo for Stephen Girard. In 1815, he became a member of the Academy of Natural Sciences of Philadelphia. William Wagner was influenced by Stephen Girard's philanthropic efforts, particularly his posthumous founding of Girard College, and dedicated the second half of his life to creating an institution that opened science education to the public.

In 1855, Wagner founded the Wagner Free Institute of Science, where he provided access to his collections of natural history specimens, scientific instruments, and books. He also hired a faculty and offered free courses on a wide range of science subjects, including botany, chemistry, mineralogy, architecture and anatomy. The museum, library and education programs were free of charge and open to all people.

During his and his wife Louisa's honeymoon across Europe from 1841-42, they visited natural history collections, educational institutions and museums across the continent, among them the British Museum in London, Jardins des Plantes in Paris, and Museum für Naturkunde in Berlin. Wagner found that he often had to provide letters of introduction to gain access to many collections. Though he was able to provide references, he considered the practice unfair and became determined to create a science education institution that would be open to everyone regardless of gender, background or financial means. Wagner first taught free science courses at his home in the early 1850s. He incorporated the institution in 1855 and erected a building to house it in 1865. He remained active as President until his death in 1885. Leadership of the institution was taken over by a Board of Trustees, who elected the noted Philadelphia scientist and Academy member Joseph Leidy. to serve as President of the Faculty.

== Personal life ==
Wagner's second wife was Louisa Binney. He died at his home in Philadelphia on January 17, 1885, at the age of 89. William and Louisa Binney Wagner are interred at the West Laurel Hill Cemetery in Bala Cynwyd, Pennsylvania.
