= Snellenburg's Clothing Factory =

- U.S. National Register of Historic Places
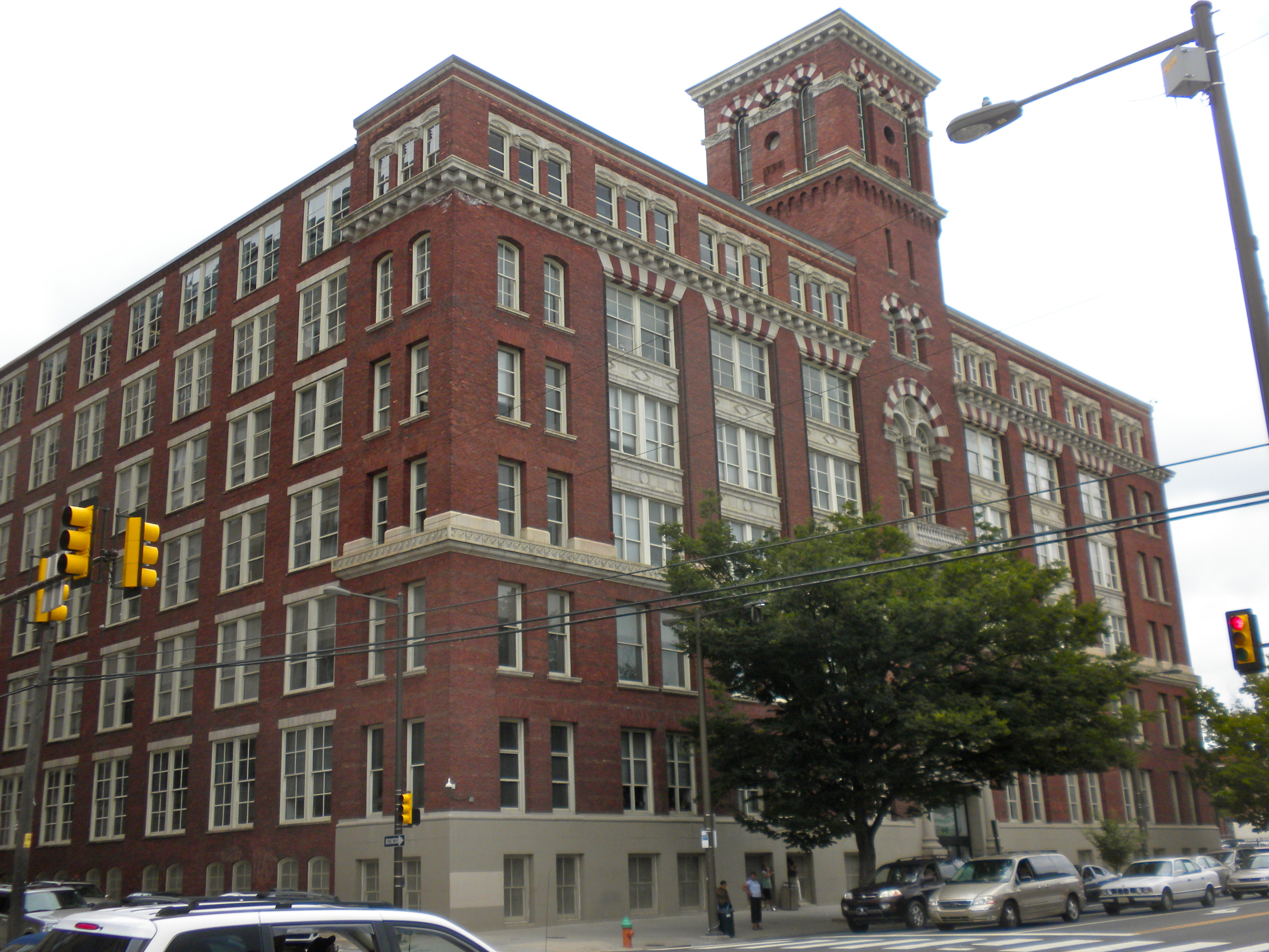
- Snellenburg's Clothing Factory, August 2010

- Location within Philadelphia Location within Pennsylvania Location within the United States
- Location: 642 N. Broad St., Philadelphia, Pennsylvania
- Coordinates: 39°57′55″N 75°9′41″W
- Area: 1 acre (0.40 ha)
- Built: 1903-1905
- Architect: Steele, William, Co.
- NRHP reference No.: 86001842
- Added to NRHP: September 2, 1986

Snellenburg's Clothing Factory is a historic factory complex located in the Spring Garden neighborhood of Philadelphia, Pennsylvania. It was built by the N. Snellenburg & Company and consists of two parts: a large, ornate building built in 1903, and a long, narrow building built in 1905. They are connected by a bridge at the fourth, fifth, and sixth floors. The front building is seven stories, constructed of limestone and brick with terra cotta ornament, and features a central tower.

It was added to the National Register of Historic Places in 1986.
