= The Franklin Residences =

- Benjamin Franklin Hotel
- U.S. National Register of Historic Places
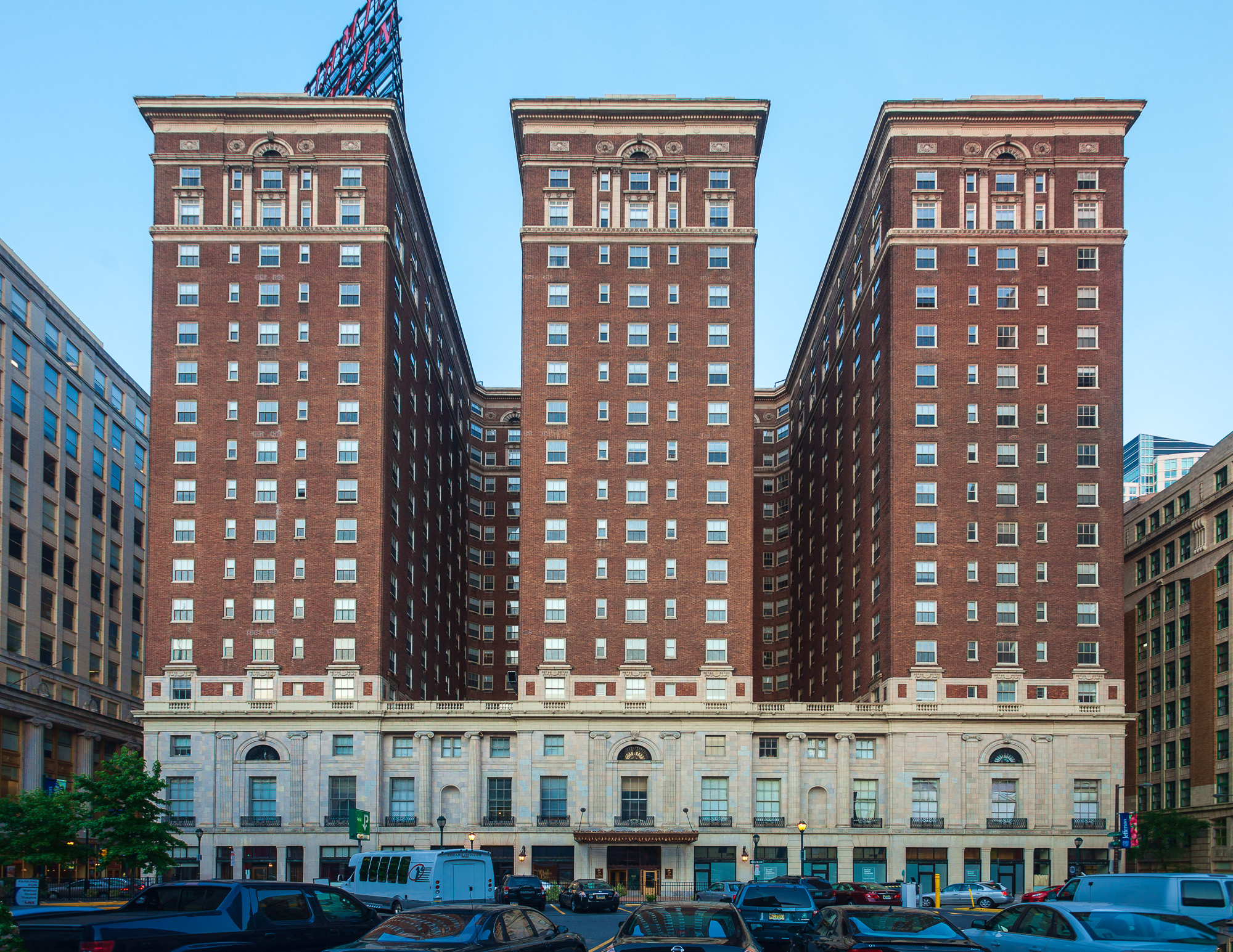
- The Franklin Residences in June 2012

- Location within Philadelphia Location within Pennsylvania Location within the United States
- Location: 822–840 Chestnut St., Philadelphia, Pennsylvania, U.S.
- Coordinates: 39°56′58.9″N 75°9′18.45″W
- Built: 1925
- Architects: Horace Trumbauer, John N. Gill
- Architectural style: Late 18th-century Anglo-American
- NRHP reference No.: 82003808
- Added to NRHP: March 2, 1982

The Franklin Residences is a historic apartment building located at 834 Chestnut Street in Center City, Philadelphia, Pennsylvania, United States. It opened on January 14, 1925, as the Benjamin Franklin Hotel and was named after United States Founding Father Benjamin Franklin.

== History ==
=== The site ===
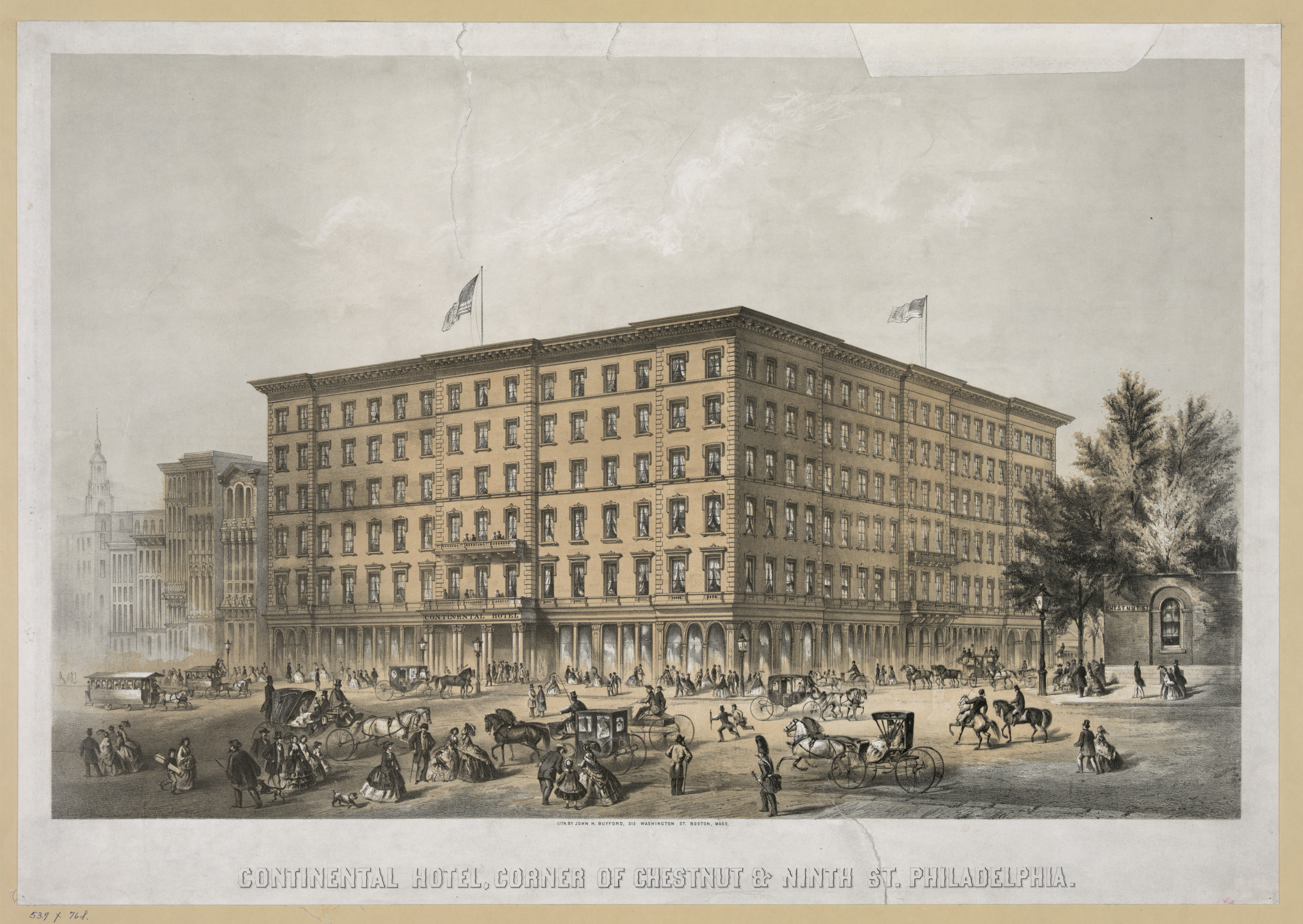
The Continental Hotel

The first hotel on the site was the Continental Hotel, built from 1857 to 1860. The 700-room, six-story hotel was designed in the Italianate style by architect John McArthur Jr., who also designed the Philadelphia City Hall. The luxurious hotel boasted one of the first elevators in the country, and a grand stairway made from polished Italian marble. Its main entrance was redesigned by noted Philadelphia architect Frank Furness in 1876.

Among its famous guests were Ulysses S. Grant, Andrew Johnson, Charles Dickens, King Edward VII, and Brazilian Emperor Dom Pedro. However, its most notable guest was president-elect Abraham Lincoln, who gave a speech from the hotel's balcony on February 21, 1861, just before his March 4 inauguration.

The aging hotel was demolished in 1924 for construction of a massive new replacement. The lamp from the balcony Lincoln spoke from was retained for the new structure and still hangs today on a balcony known as the "Lincoln Balcony", at the same spot as the one from which Lincoln spoke.

=== Hotel ===
The Benjamin Franklin Hotel, opened on January 14, 1925, named for Founding Father and Philadelphian, Benjamin Franklin. It was designed by prominent American Gilded Age architect Horace Trumbauer, built by Niagara Falls businessman Frank A. Dudley and operated by the United Hotels Company of America.

The Benjamin Franklin made news in 1947, when the segregated establishment refused to accommodate the Brooklyn Dodgers, who had used the hotel for years, because of the presence of Jackie Robinson, the first African-American player in Major League Baseball. The Bellevue-Stratford Hotel agreed to house the team that day. The team later moved their permanent accommodations to The Warwick Hotel.

William Chadwick was the general manager for many years in the 1960s to 1970s, followed by Harry Gilbert and then Tom Johnson just prior to the hotel's closing in the 1980s. Also on the staff in the late 1960s to early 1970s was Robert C. Bennett, Jr., grandson of noted 1930s hotel manager Claude H. Bennett, and in 1974 the founding professor of the hotel management degree program at Delaware County Community College.

The hotel was owned by Bankers Securities Corporation which owned several Philadelphia hotels, including the Bellevue-Stratford Hotel, the Sullivan, and the former Holiday Inn near the football/baseball stadiums. During the Army–Navy Game each year, the hotel traditionally hosted Army. The 1970s were a slow period with hotels hoping to benefit by the 1976 Bicentennial Celebration in the original Thirteen Colonies. However, the 1976 celebration was not the tourist financial success expected.

Also, in 1976 the state of New Jersey legalized casino gambling, which further diluted the hotel industry demand in greater Philadelphia as new hotels opened in Atlantic City. The hotel closed in 1980, and the vacant building was listed on the National Register of Historic Places in 1982.

=== Apartment building ===
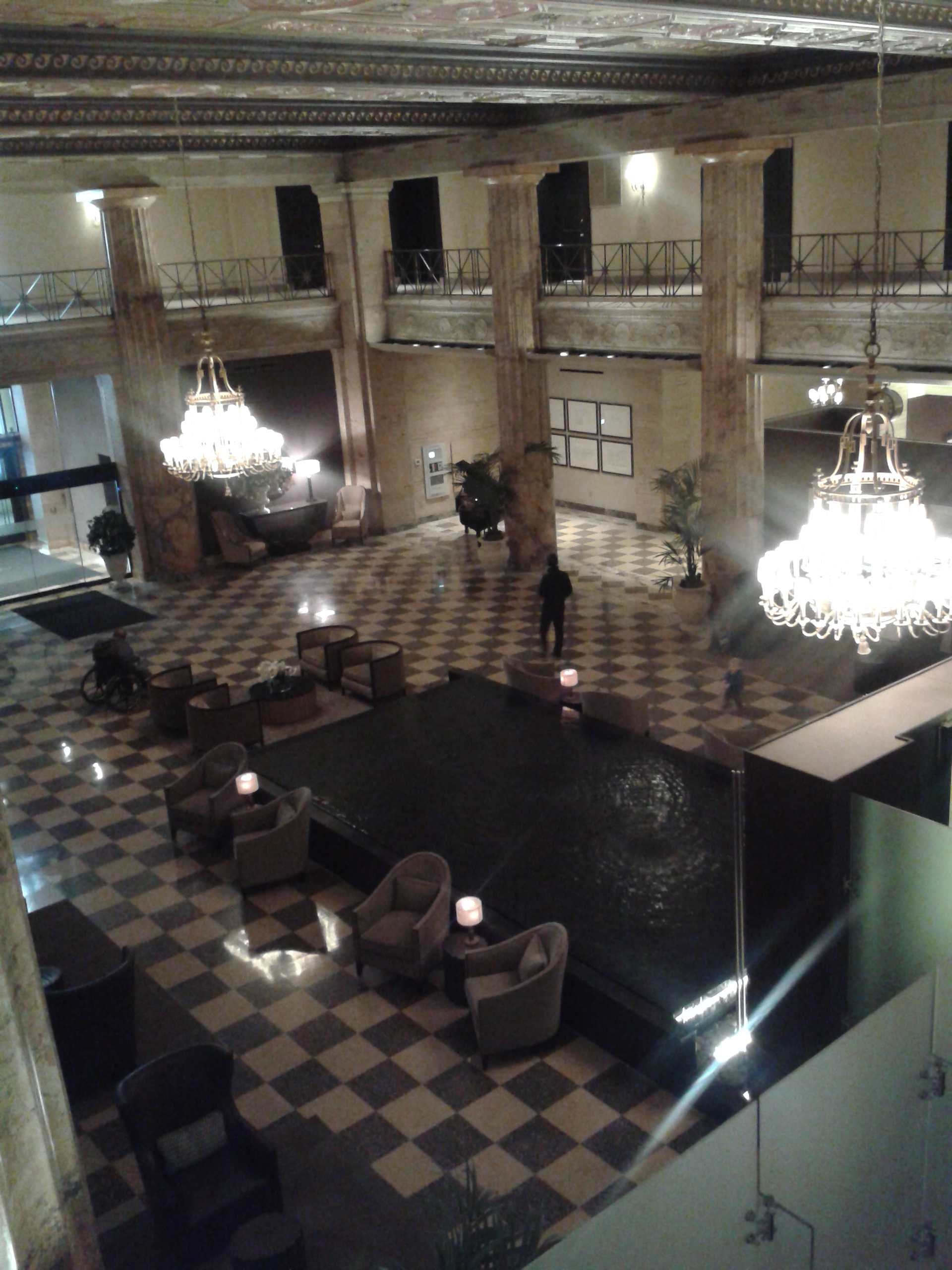
Lobby of The Franklin Residences in 2014

The hotel was converted to house 412 apartments and 120,000 square feet (11,000 m^{2}) of office space. It reopened in 1986 as the Benjamin Franklin House - affectionately referred to as "The Ben" by many Philadelphians.

During the renovation, the historic grand ballroom of the hotel was converted into office space. This resulted in objections by the National Park Service, so the ballroom was restored in 1988 to qualify for federal tax credits. One of Philadelphia's largest ballrooms, it is now managed by Finley Catering and used for banquet/weddings, marketed as Ballroom at the Ben.

The building was purchased by Korman Communities in 2011. They invested $13 million in renovations and renamed it "The Franklin Residences" in 2014. The Franklin Residences specializes in studio, one, and two bedroom luxury apartments, as well as fully furnished suites with flexible leases for individuals needing temporary accommodations.

The finale of the Oscar-winning 2012 film Silver Linings Playbook was filmed in the building's ballroom and its lobby.
