= Chestnut Street (Philadelphia) =

Street in Pennsylvania, U.S.

Coordinates: 39.9529°N 75.180°W

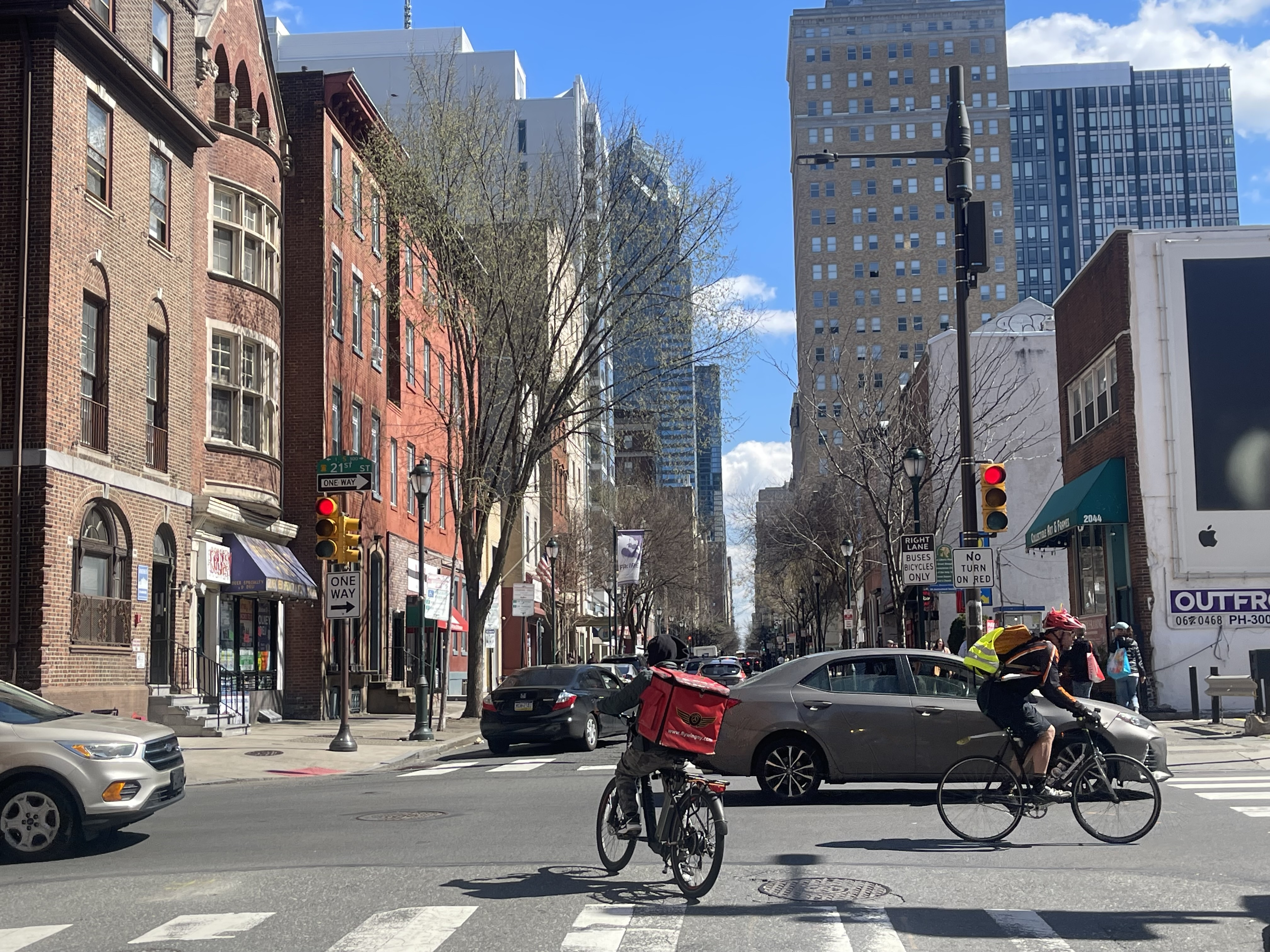
- 21st and Chestnut in Center City
- Interactive map of Chestnut Street
- Maintained by: PennDOT and City of Philadelphia
- Length: 5.6 mi (9.0 km)
- Component highways: SR 3008 from Front Street to City Hall; PA 3 eastbound between 63rd and 33rd Streets in Philadelphia
- Location: Center City, Pennsylvania, U.S.
- West end: PA 3 in Cobbs Creek
- Major junctions: US 13 in University City; I-76 in University City; PA 611 (Broad Street) in Center City
- East end: Front Street in Penn's Landing
- North: Market Street
- South: Walnut Street

Construction
- Commissioned: 1682

Chestnut Street is a major historic street in Philadelphia, Pennsylvania. It was originally named Wynne Street because Thomas Wynne's home was there. William Penn renamed it Chestnut Street in 1684. It runs east–west from the Delaware River waterfront in downtown Philadelphia through Center City and West Philadelphia. The road crosses the Schuylkill River on the Chestnut Street Bridge. It serves as eastbound Pennsylvania Route 3 between 63rd and 33rd Streets.

Stratton's Tavern was located on Chestnut Street near Sixth Street. When the citizens of Philadelphia were afraid that the British might attack the essentially unmanned Fort Mifflin, the secretary of the Young Men's Democratic Society called a meeting held at Stratton's Tavern at Chestnut and Sixth Streets on March 20, 1813. The young men agreed to volunteer their services to defend the fort.

== Points of interest ==
From east to west:

- United States Custom House
- National Liberty Museum
- Carpenters' Hall
- First National Bank (now part of the Science History Institute)
- Old City Hall
- Second Bank of the United States
- Independence Hall
- Liberty Bell
- Former Gimbels department store 1927 addition, Chestnut & 9th Streets, northeast corner
- The Franklin Residences, formerly the Benjamin Franklin Hotel
- Belgravia Hotel
- Historic Main Post Office (now the IRS' 30th Street Campus)
- Drexel University
- University of Pennsylvania

== Major intersections ==
The entire street is in Philadelphia, Philadelphia County.

| Location | mi | km | Destinations | Notes |
|---|---|---|---|---|
| Cobbs Creek | 0.0 | 0.0 | PA 3 west (Cobbs Creek Parkway) | Western terminus of concurrency with PA 3 |
| University City | 2.6 | 4.2 | US 13 / PA 3 west (38th Street) | |
| University City | 3.1 | 5.0 | PA 3 east (33rd Street) | Eastern terminus of concurrency with PA 3 |
| University City | 3.5 | 5.6 | I-76 (Schuylkill Expressway) to I-95 south / I-676 east | Access via Schuylkill Avenue; exit 345 on I-76 |
| Schuylkill River | 3.5– 3.7 | 5.6– 6.0 | Chestnut Street Bridge | |
| Center City | 4.5 | 7.2 | PA 611 (Broad Street / Avenue of the Arts) | |
| Penn's Landing | 5.6 | 9.0 | Front Street | To I-95 south |
1.000 mi = 1.609 km; 1.000 km = 0.621 mi: Concurrency terminus

== Gallery ==
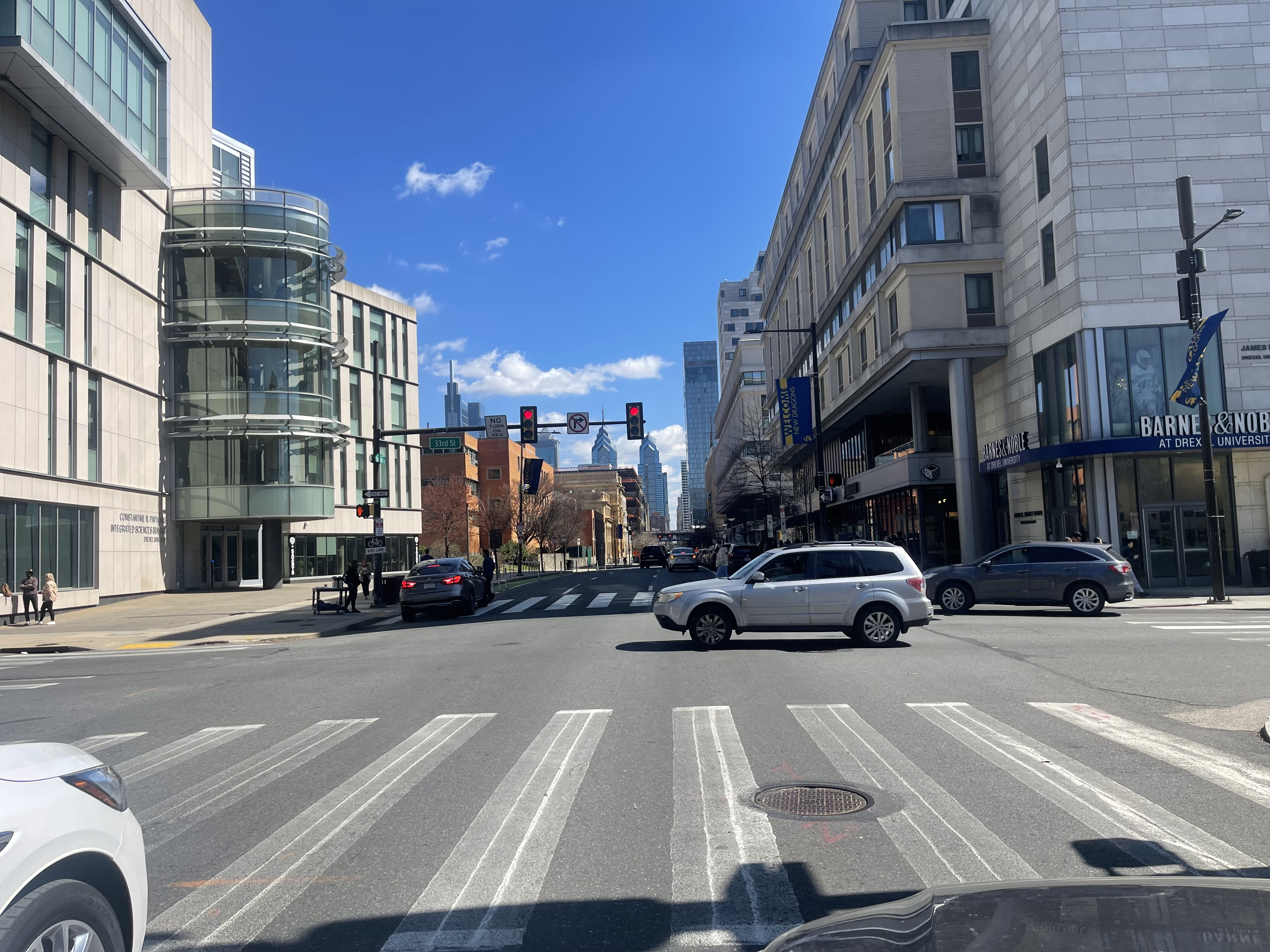
33rd and Chestnut Streets in University City

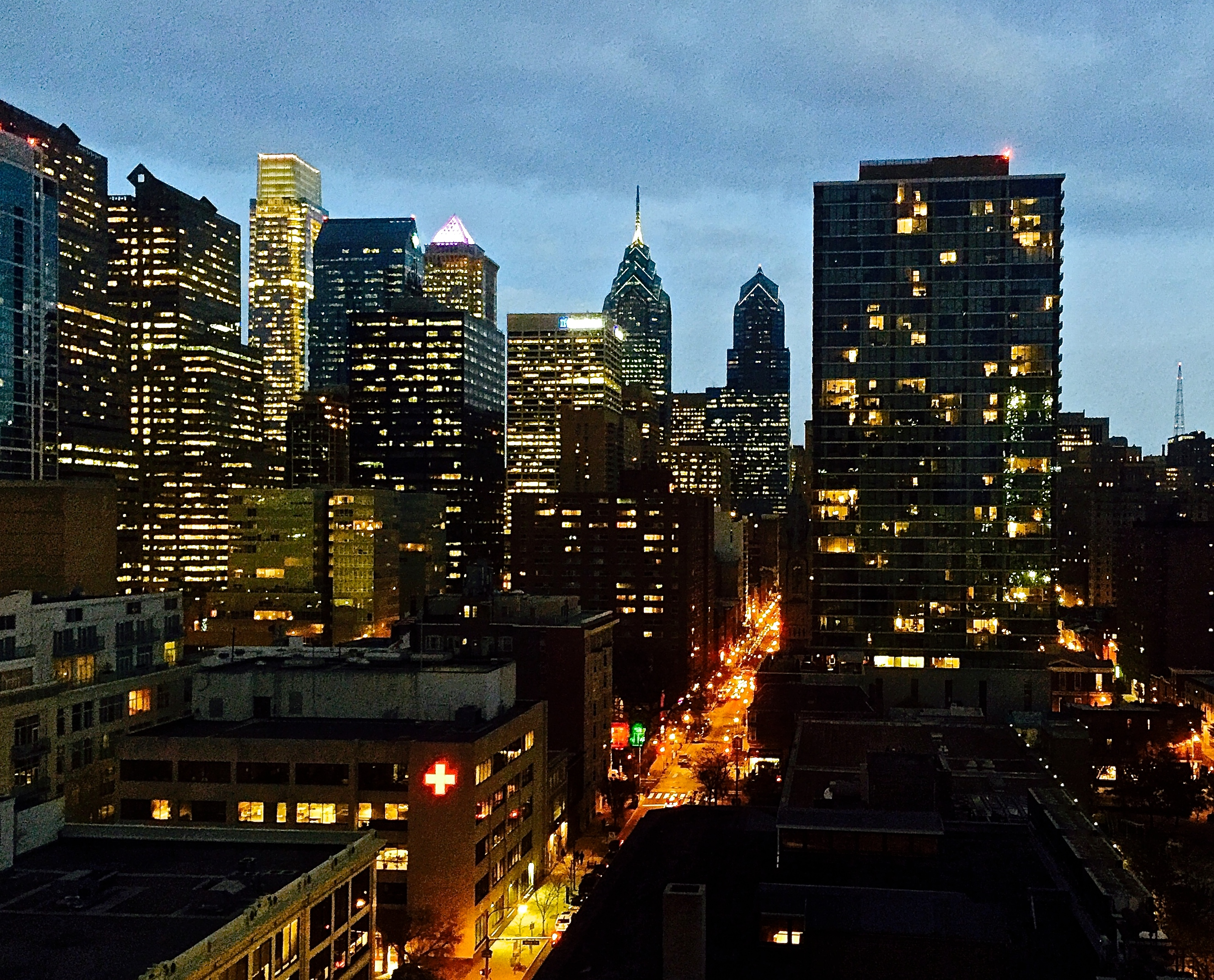
Chestnut Street in Philadelphia at night in February 2016

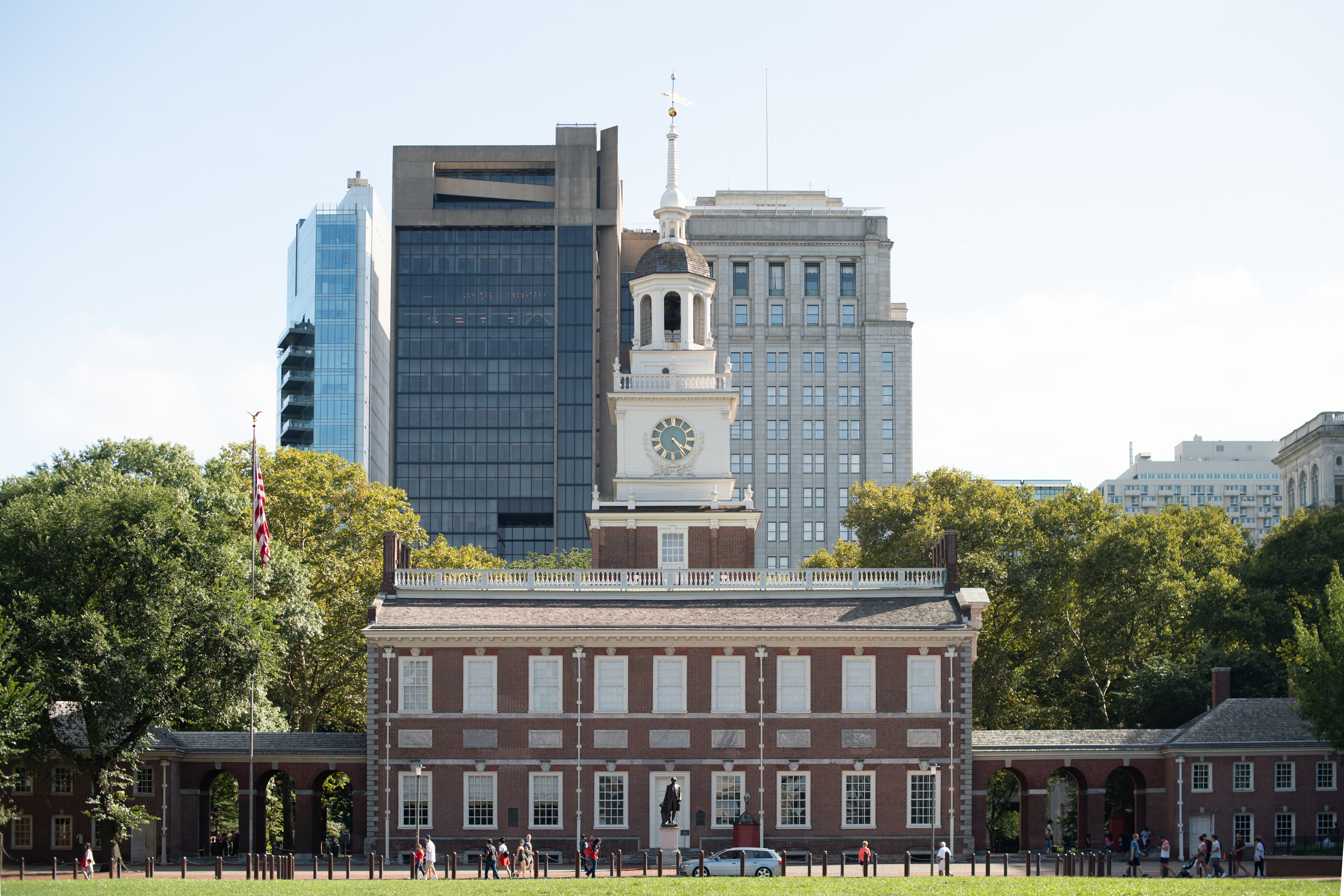
Independence Hall, a landmark between 5th and 6th Streets on Chestnut Street

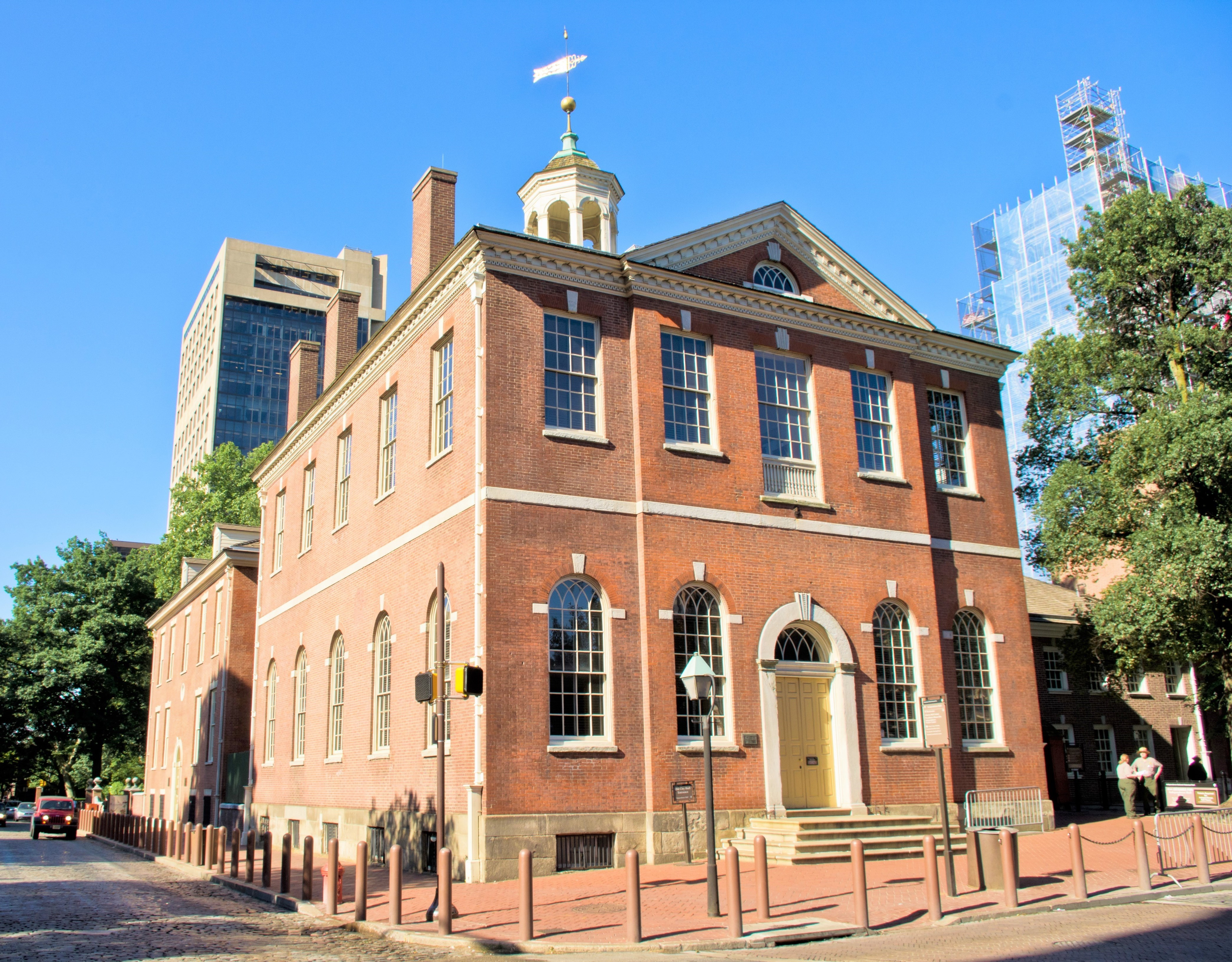
Old City Hall at 5th and Chestnut Streets

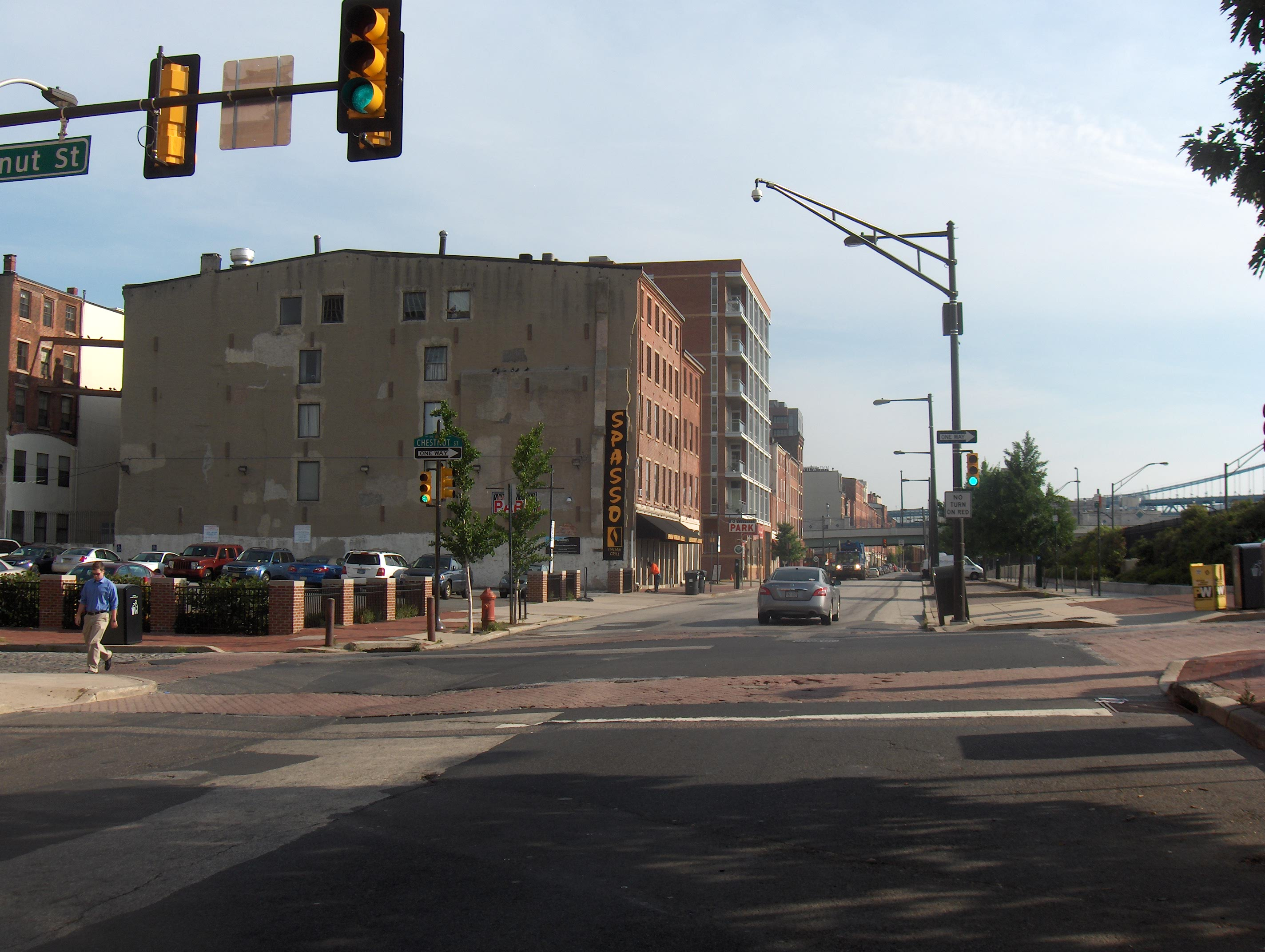
Eastern terminus at Front Street

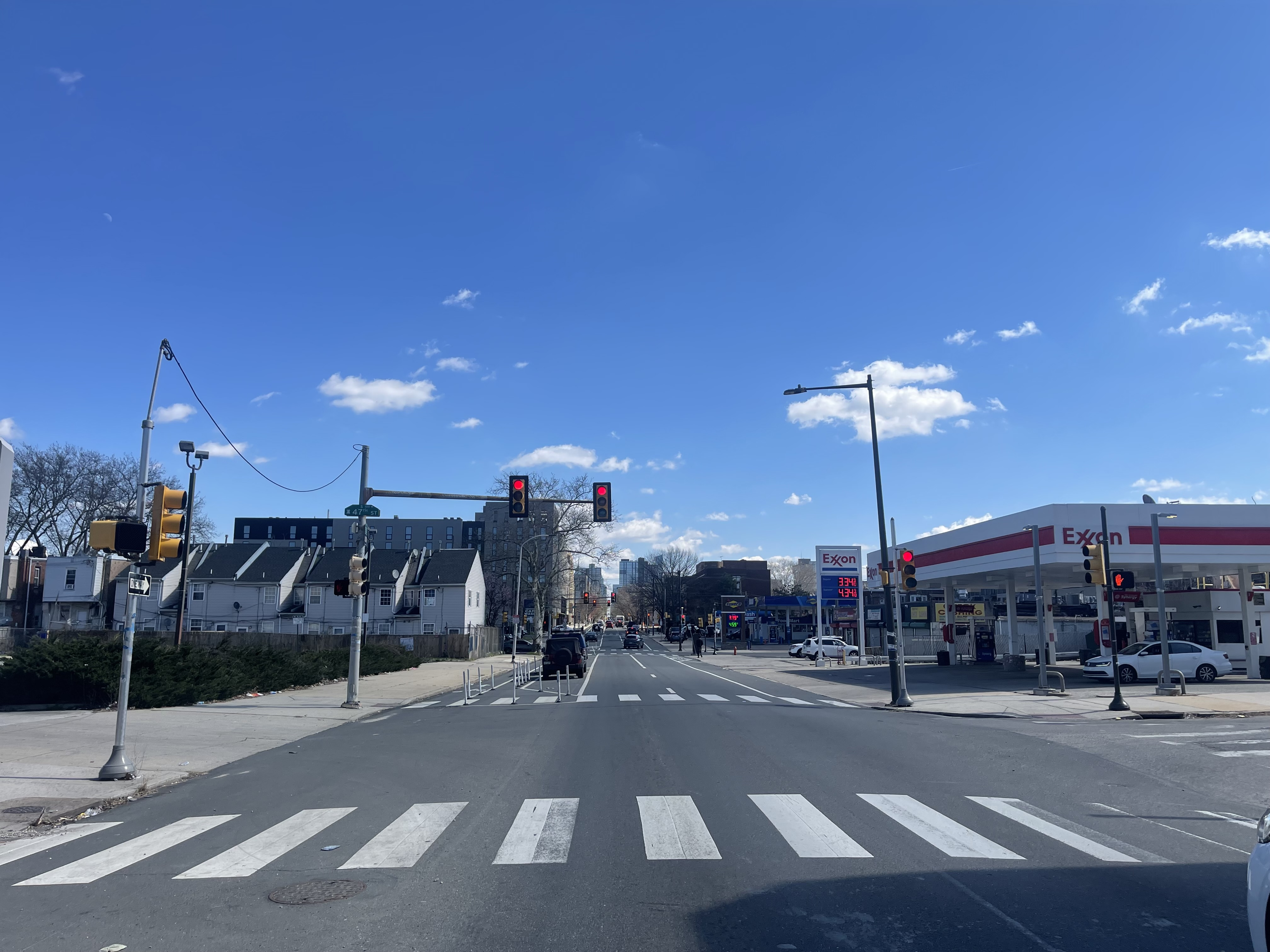
Chestnut and 47th Street
