= 1854 Philadelphia mayoral election =

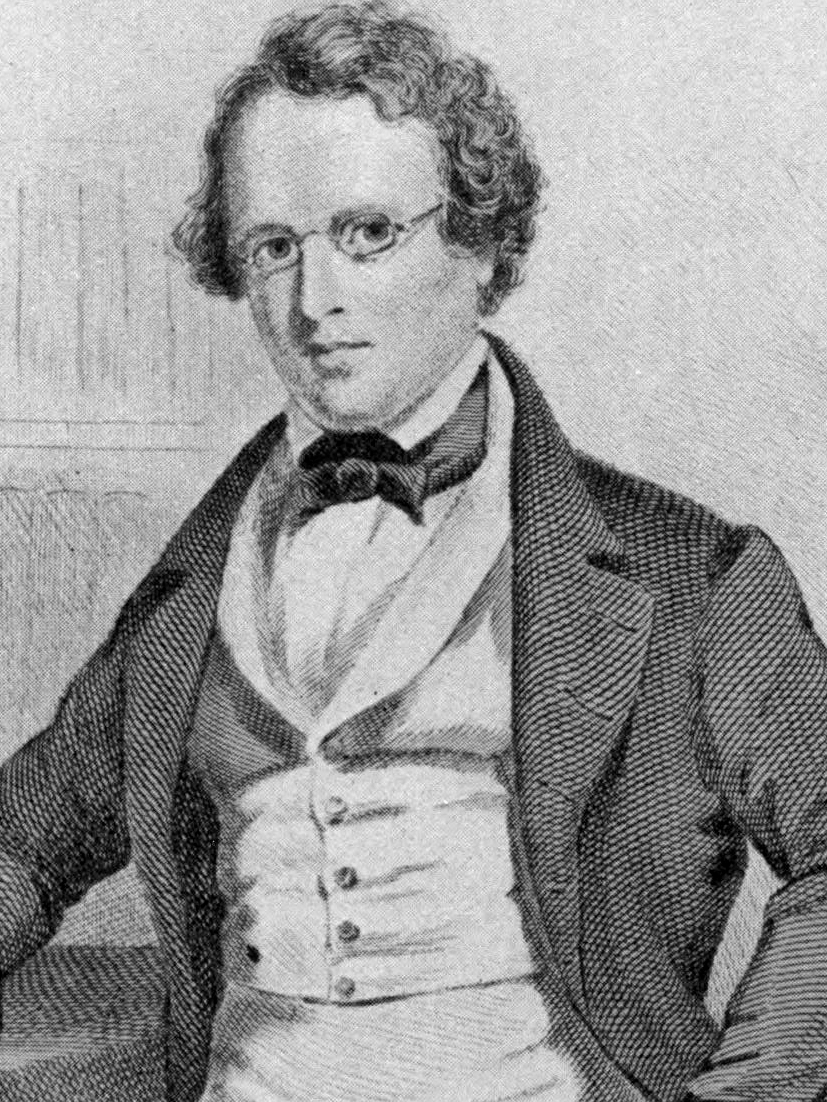

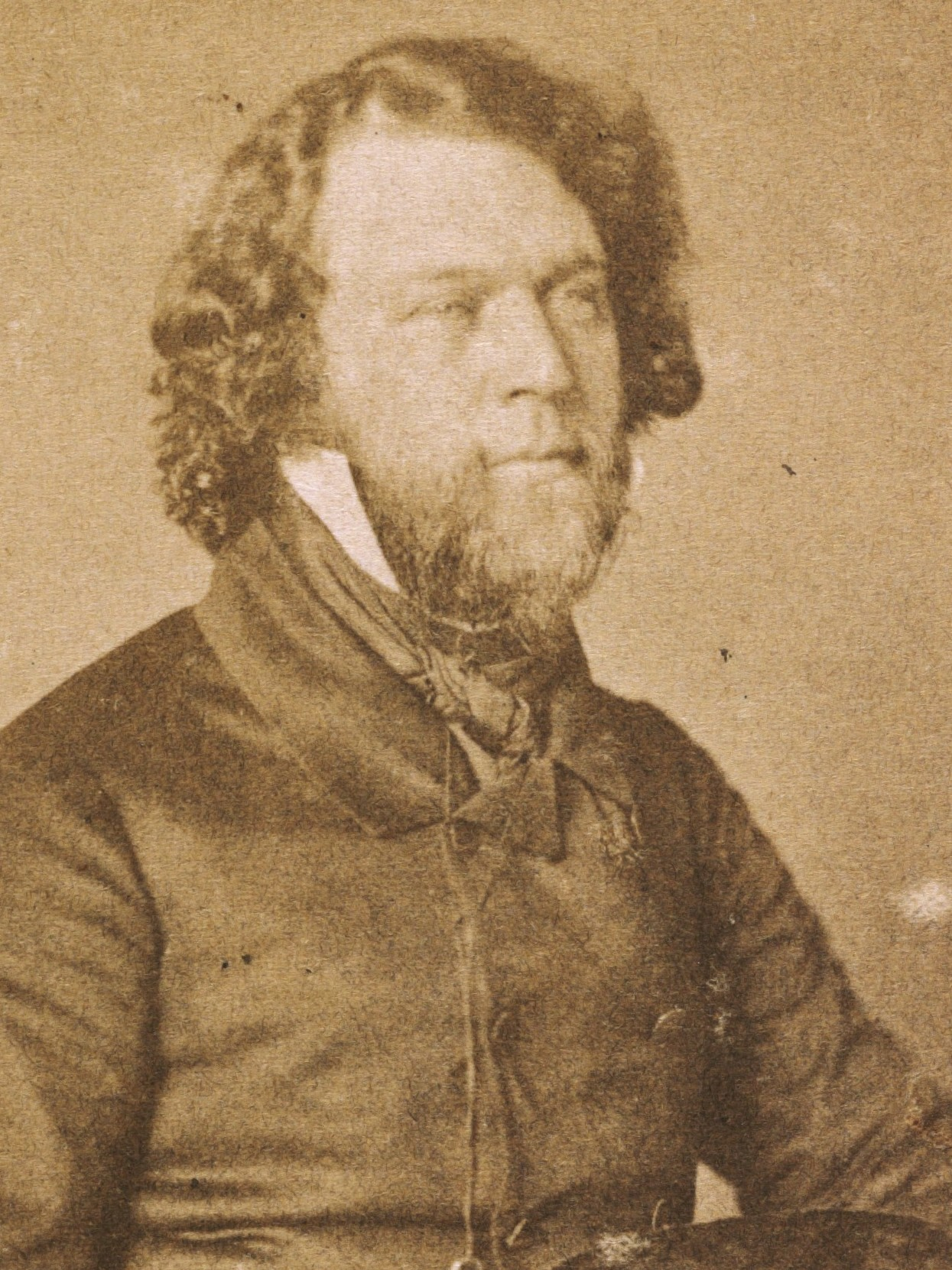
Nominee	Robert T. Conrad	Richard Vaux
Party	Whig	Democratic
Popular vote	29,421	20,993
Percentage	58.36%	41.64%
Mayor before election
Charles Gilpin
Whig
Elected mayor
Robert T. Conrad
Whig

The 1854 Philadelphia mayoral election saw the election of Robert T. Conrad.

This was the first mayoral election since Philadelphia's county-city consolidation. It was also the first election to a two-year term, with previous elections having been to only a single-year term. It was also the last won by the Whig Party.

== Results ==
1854 Philadelphia mayoral election
Party	Candidate	Votes	%
Whig	Robert T. Conrad	29,421	58.36
Democratic	Richard Vaux	20,993	41.64
Turnout		50,414	
