= 1856 Philadelphia mayoral election =

- May 6, 1856
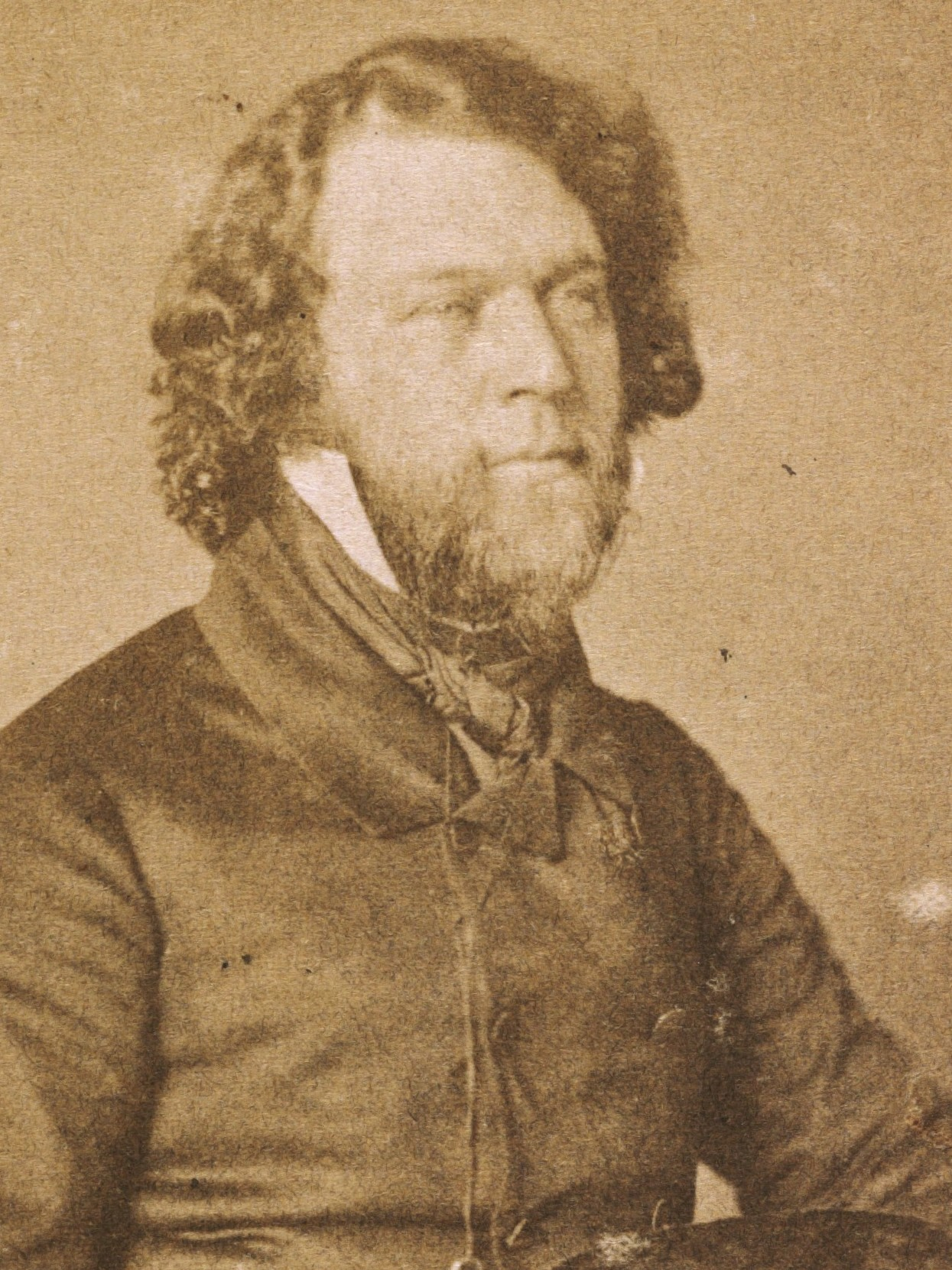

Nominee	Richard Vaux	Henry Dunning Moore
Party	Democratic	Know Nothing
Popular vote	29,534	25,445
Percentage	53.4%	46.1%
Mayor before election
Robert T. Conrad
Whig
Elected mayor
Richard Vaux
Democratic

The 1856 Philadelphia mayoral election was held on May 6, 1856. The Democratic candidate Richard Vaux defeated the Know Nothing candidate Henry Dunning Moore.

== General election ==
=== Results ===
1856 Philadelphia mayoral election
Party	Candidate	Votes	%
Democratic	Richard Vaux	29,534	53.45
Know Nothing	Henry Dunning Moore	25,445	46.05
Republican	William B. Thomas	280	0.51
Total votes		55,259	100.00

== Bibliography ==
- Mueller, Henry R. (1922). The Whig Party in Pennsylvania (PhD thesis). New York: Columbia University.
