= 1842 Philadelphia mayoral election =

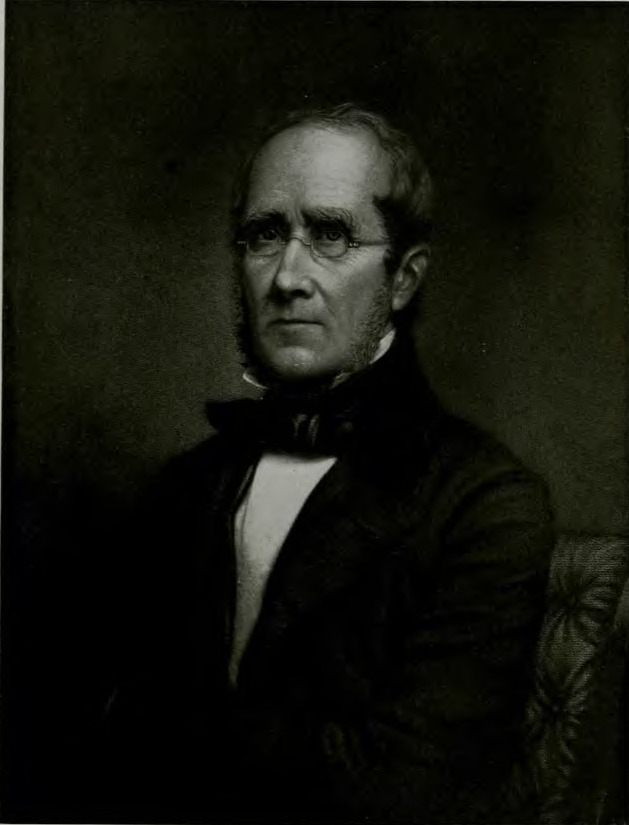

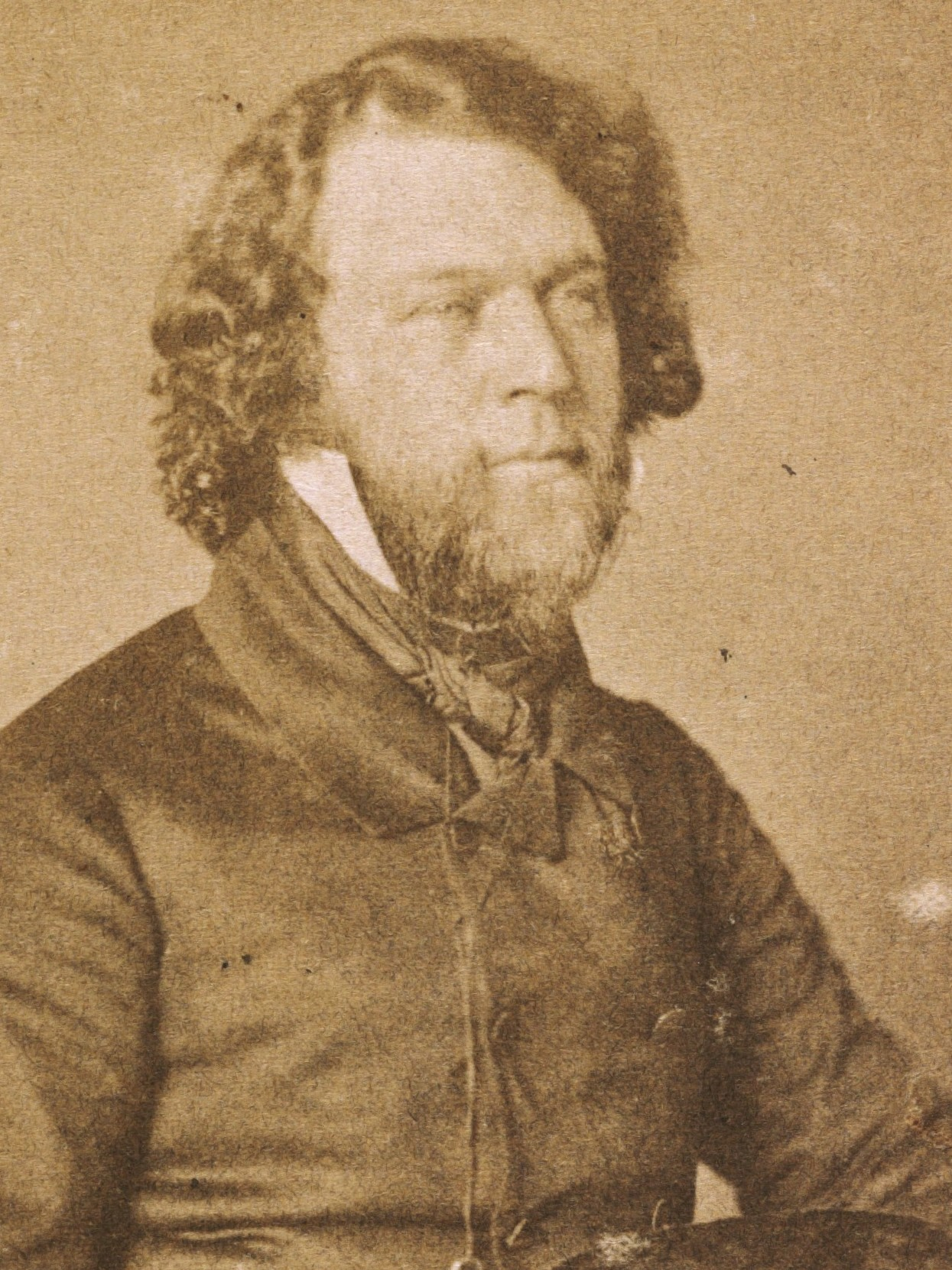
Nominee	John Morin Scott	Richard Vaux
Party	Whig	Democratic
Popular vote	6,145	5,065
Percentage	54.80%	45.17%
Mayor before election
John Morin Scott
Whig
Elected mayor
John Morin Scott
Whig

The 1842 Philadelphia mayoral election saw the reelection of John Morin Scott.

== Electoral system ==
Beginning in 1839, the city operated under a mixed electoral system. Citizens voted for mayor in a general election. If a candidate receive a majority of the vote, they would be elected mayor. However, if no candidate received a majority, the City Council would select a mayor from the top-two finishers.

== Results ==
1842 Philadelphia mayoral election results
Party	Candidate	Votes	%
Whig	John Morin Scott (incumbent)	6,145	54.80%
Democratic	Richard Vaux	5,065	45.17%
	Others	3	0.03%
Total votes		11,213	100.00%
