= Richard Vaux =

American politician (1816-1895)

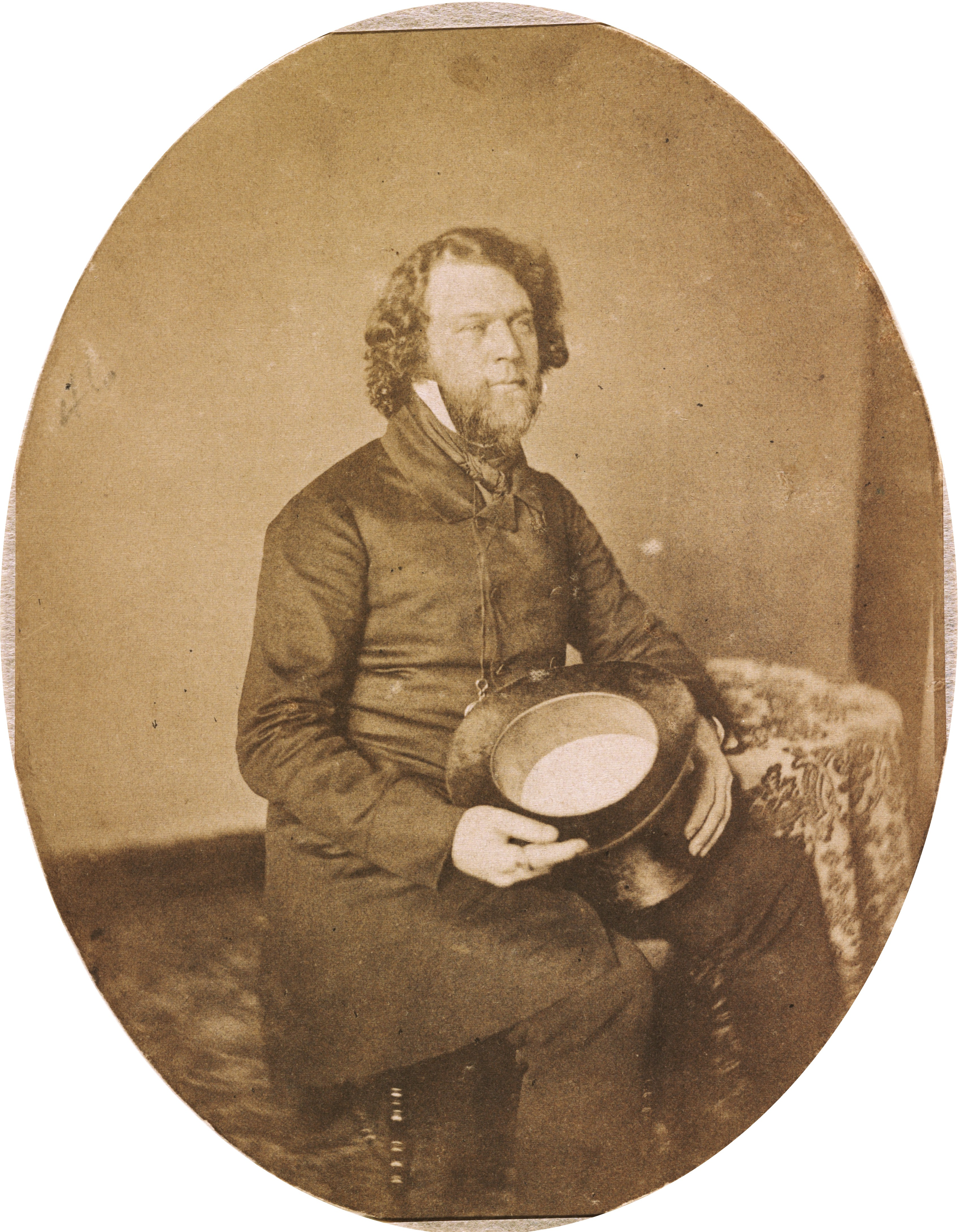

Member of the U.S. House of Representatives from Pennsylvania's 3rd district
- In office May 20, 1890 – March 3, 1891
- Preceded by: Samuel J. Randall
- Succeeded by: William McAleer

Mayor of Philadelphia
- In office 1857–1858
- Preceded by: Robert T. Conrad
- Succeeded by: Alexander Henry

Personal details
- Born: December 19, 1816 Philadelphia, Pennsylvania, U.S.
- Died: March 22, 1895 (aged 78) Philadelphia, Pennsylvania, U.S.
- Resting place: Laurel Hill Cemetery, Philadelphia, Pennsylvania, U.S.
- Party: Democratic

Richard Vaux (December 19, 1816 – March 22, 1895) was an American politician who served as a Democratic member of the U.S. House of Representatives for Pennsylvania's 3rd congressional district from 1890 to 1891. He served as mayor of Philadelphia from 1857 to 1858.

== Early life and education ==
Vaux was born on December 19, 1816, in Philadelphia, Pennsylvania. His father was the judge and philanthropist Roberts Vaux. He was a Quaker and educated by private tutors at the Friends Select School in Philadelphia and Bolmar's French School in West Chester, Pennsylvania. He studied law under William M. Meredith and in 1837 was admitted to the bar in Philadelphia. Vaux traveled to London with government dispatches and remained for a year to serve as secretary of legation under Andrew Stevenson, United States Minister to Great Britain.

== Career ==
Vaux returned to Philadelphia in 1839. He was nominated as a Democratic candidate for Pennsylvania State House of Representatives but lost to the Whig candidate. He served on the Board of Governors for the Eastern State Penitentiary from 1839 to 1892. In 1840, he started a private law practice in Philadelphia and was a delegate to the Democratic State convention. He worked as member of the Board of Comptrollers for the public schools in Philadelphia and as recorder of deeds in Philadelphia from 1841 to 1847. In 1845, he published the Recorders' Decisions.

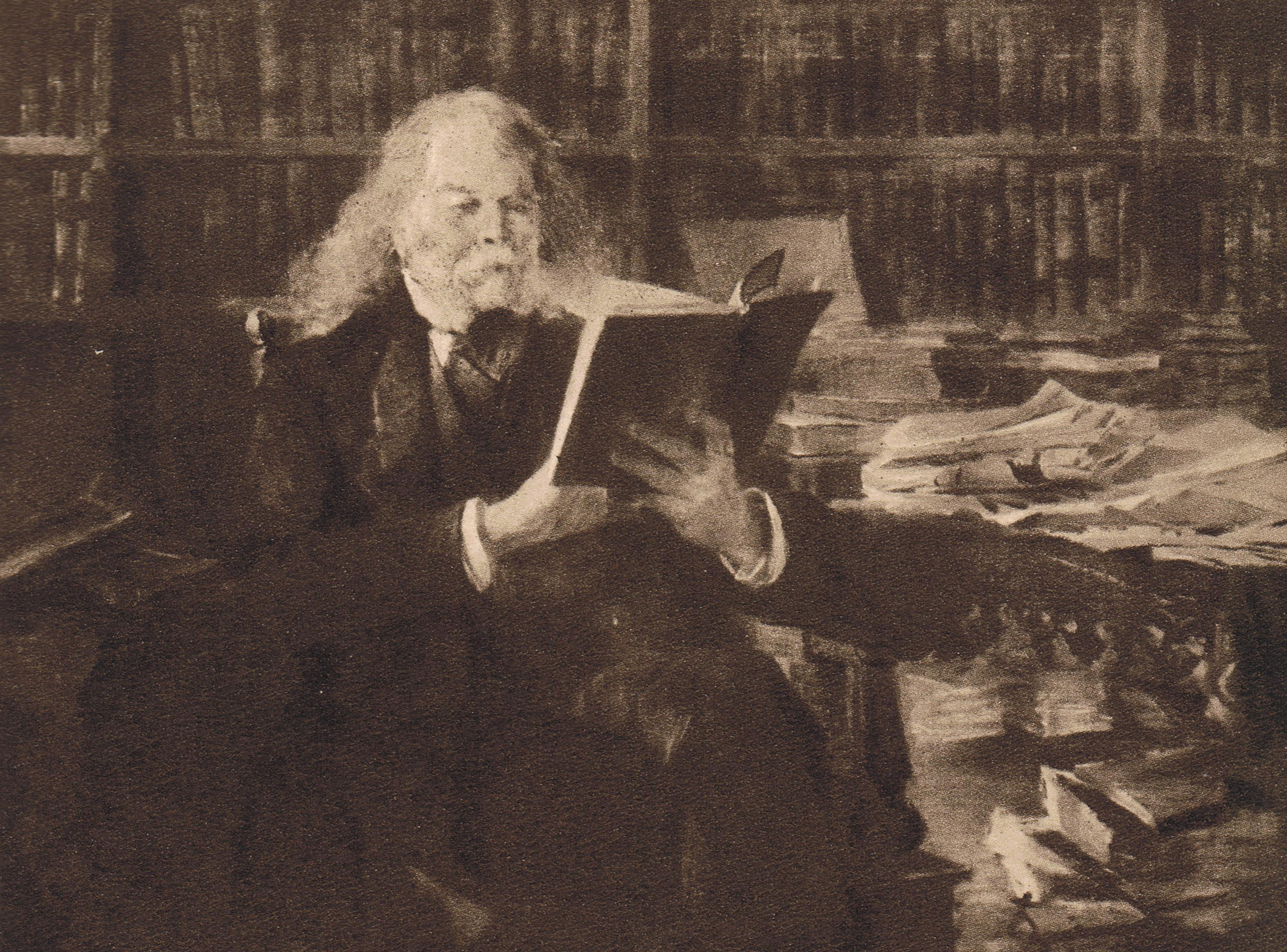
Painting of Richard Vaux by John McLure Hamilton

Vaux ran unsuccessfully for mayor as a Democrat in the 1842 Philadelphia mayoral election against John Morin Scott, the 1848 Philadelphia mayoral election against John Swift, and the 1854 Philadelphia mayoral election against Robert T. Conrad. He partnered with Irish politicians and was elected mayor in the 1856 Philadelphia mayoral election. His administration increased the size of the police force, removed the requirement for policemen to be born in the United States, implemented a police and fire telegraph system and established uniforms. He was defeated for reelection in the 1858 Philadelphia mayoral election by Alexander Henry.

Vaux also served as a member of the Board of City Trusts from 1859 to 1866, and as president from 1863 to 1865. He was outspoken against abolitionism and African-Americans. During the American Civil War, his pro-southern proclivities and affinity with Bourbon Democrats earned him the nickname, the "Bourbon War Horse".

He was a Freemason and served as Grand Master of the Grand Lodge of Pennsylvania from 1868 to 1869. He served as president of the Philadelphia Club, was a member of the Girard College board for many years, and was elected as a member of the American Philosophical Society in 1884.

Vaux was elected in 1890 as a Democrat to the 51st Congress to fill the vacancy left by the death of Samuel J. Randall and served from May 20, 1890, to March 3, 1891. He lost his bid for reelection in 1890.

He died on March 22, 1895, in Philadelphia and was interred in Laurel Hill Cemetery.

== Personal life ==
Vaux married Mary Morris Waln and together they had four surviving children.

== Publications ==
- Reports of Some of the Criminal Cases on Primary Hearing, Before Richard Vaux, Recorder of the City of Philadelphia., Philadelphia: T. & J.W. Johnson, 1846
- Address Delivered Before the Philadelphia Hose Company, on the 47th Anniversary, Held at the Columbia House, on the Evening of December 16, 1850., Philadelphia: Bryson & Cooper, 1850
- Brief Sketch of the Origin and History of the State Penitentiary for the Eastern District of Pennsylvania, at Philadelphia., Philadelphia: McLaughlin Brothers, 1872
- Short Talks on Crime-cause and Convict Punishment., Philadelphia, 1882

Political offices
Preceded by Robert Thomas Conrad	Mayor of Philadelphia; 1856–1858	Succeeded by Alexander Henry
U.S. House of Representatives
Preceded by Samuel J. Randall	Member of the U.S. House of Representatives from Pennsylvania's 3rd congressional district 1890–1891	Succeeded by William McAleer
