= Robert T. Conrad =

American politician, lawyer and writer

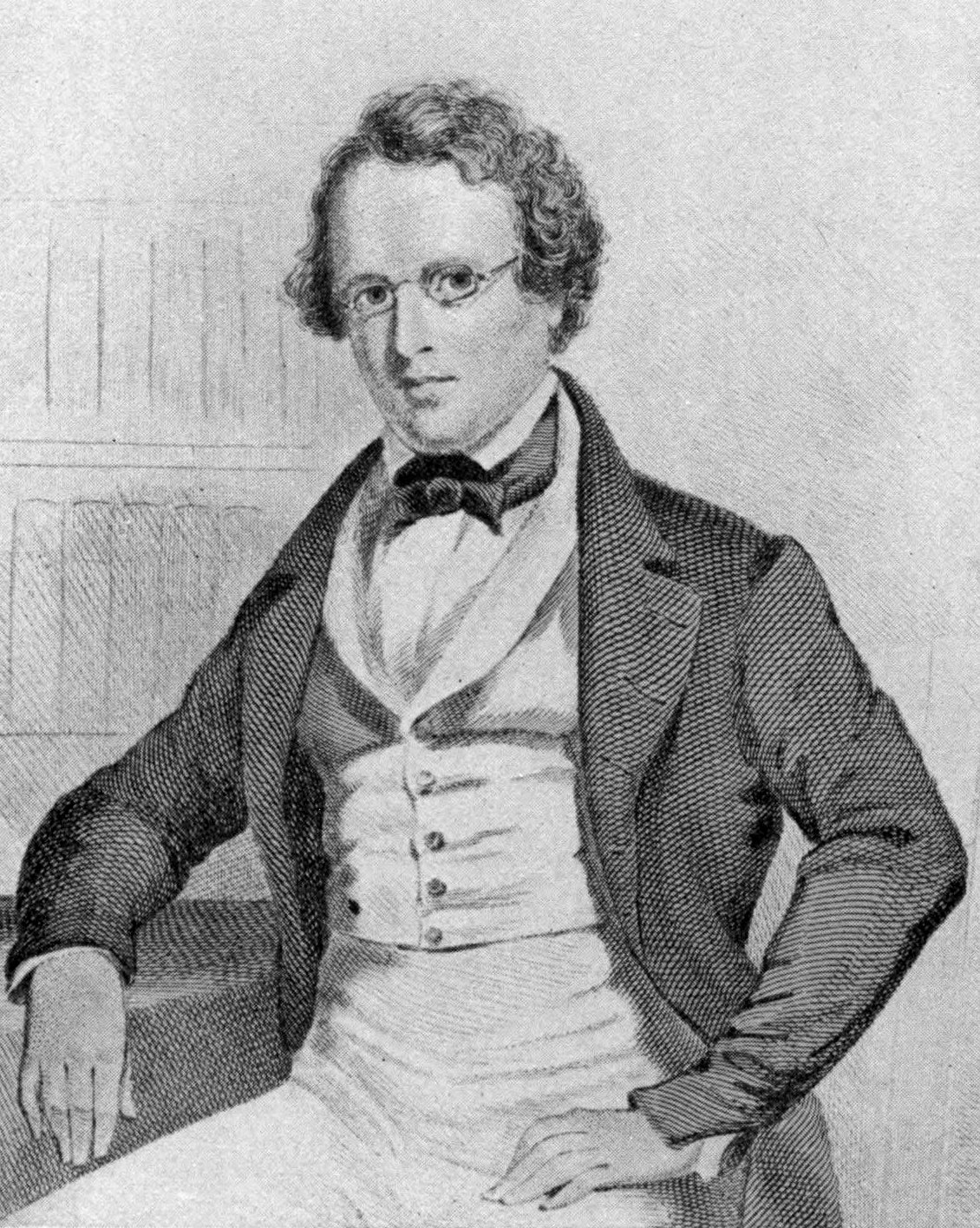

Mayor of Philadelphia
- In office 1854–1856
- Preceded by: Charles Gilpin
- Succeeded by: Richard Vaux

Personal details
- Born: June 10, 1810 Philadelphia, Pennsylvania, U.S.
- Died: June 27, 1858 (aged 48) Philadelphia, Pennsylvania, U.S.
- Resting place: Laurel Hill Cemetery, Philadelphia, Pennsylvania, U.S.

Robert Taylor Conrad (June 10, 1810 – June 27, 1858) was an American politician, lawyer and writer from Pennsylvania who served as mayor of Philadelphia from 1854 to 1856. He was the first mayor of Philadelphia after the Consolidation Act of 1854.

== Life and politics ==
He was the son of a publisher of Philadelphia, was educated for the bar, and attained a high reputation as a political speaker, and as an editor and poet. Before he was 21, he wrote a tragedy, Conradin, and in 1832 published the Daily Commercial Intelligencer, which was merged into the Philadelphia Gazette. Abandoning this occupation from failing health in 1834, he returned to the law, became recorder, and in 1838 judge of the criminal sessions for the city and county of Philadelphia. When the latter court was dissolved, he resumed the pen, edited Graham's Magazine, and became associate editor of the North American Review.

Conrad was recorder (part-time judge) for the suburban township of Northern Liberties, which became part of the city under the Consolidation Act of 1854. In the 1854 Philadelphia mayoral election, Conrad was the nominee of both the Whigs and Know Nothings (later known as the American Party). He won in a landslide, riding a wave of nativist sentiment that swept the United States in the mid-1850s. In 1856 he was appointed to the bench of the quarter sessions, serving in that capacity until 1857.

In literature he is best known by the tragedy of Aylmere, purchased by Edwin Forrest, in which that actor played the part of Jack Cade. The play was said to be "one of the few American tragedies to hold the stage." In 1852 Judge Conrad published a volume entitled Aylmere, or the Bondman of Kent, and other Poems, the principal poems being "The Sons of the Wilderness," a meditative poem on the wrongs and misfortunes of the North American Indians, and a series of sonnets on the Lord's Prayer. Another tragedy that he wrote, The Heretic, was never acted, nor published.

Conrad lived in West Philadelphia (at the corner of Lancaster Road and Market Street) at a time when that part of the city was largely uninhabited. Conrad was the son-in-law of U.S. Representative Thomas Kittera.

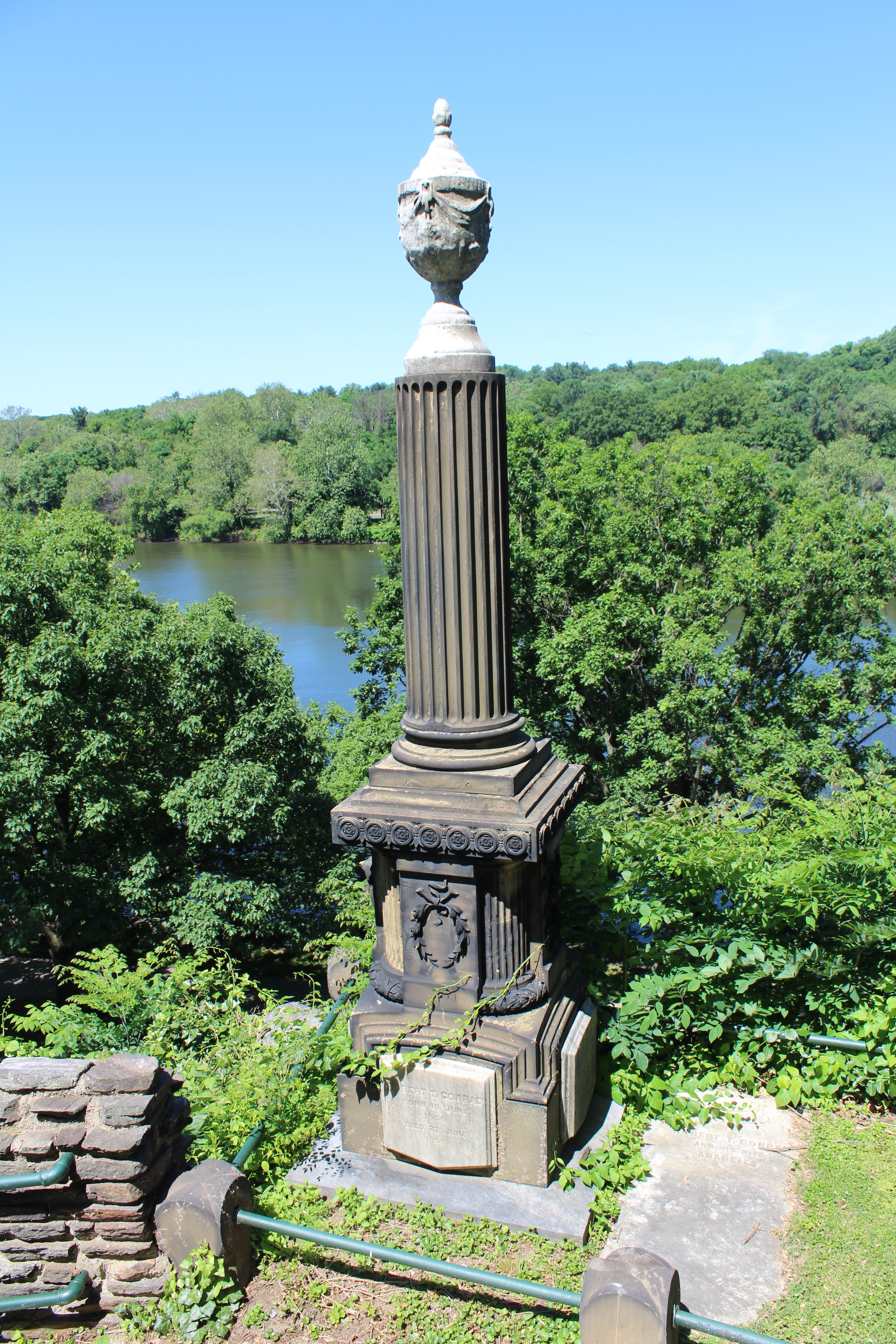
Robert T. Conrad Monument in Laurel Hill Cemetery

He died on June 17, 1858, and was interred at Laurel Hill Cemetery in Philadelphia.

== Legacy ==
The Robert T. Conrad public school in Philadelphia was named in his honor.

== Notes ==
Political offices
Preceded by Charles Gilpin	Mayor of Philadelphia; 1854–1856	Succeeded by Richard Vaux
