= Timeline of Philadelphia =

Coordinates: 39.95°N 75.17°W

The following is a timeline of the history of the city of Philadelphia, Pennsylvania.

== 17th century ==
- 1682 – Philadelphia founded as capital of the English Crown Province of Pennsylvania by William Penn
- 1689 – William Penn Charter School founded
- 1691 – Appointment of first mayor, Humphrey Morrey, by Penn

== 18th century ==
- 1700 – Swedish Lutheran Gloria Dei Church consecrated.
- 1710 – Town Hall built.
- 1711 – Trinity Church built
- 1719 – American Weekly Mercury newspaper begins publication.
- 1722 – James Logan becomes mayor
- 1728
  - Pennsylvania Gazette newspaper begins publication
  - Printer Benjamin Franklin in business.
- 1731 – Library Company of Philadelphia established
- 1735 – Pennsylvania State House built
- 1736 – Union Fire Company formed
- 1740 – Kahal Kadosh Mikveh Israel founded
- 1742
  - The Pennsylvania Journal newspaper begins publication.
  - October: Philadelphia Election Riot
- 1743 – Philosophical Society founded
- 1744 – Christ Church built
- 1745 – New Market built.
- 1749 – Academy of Philadelphia founded
- 1751
  - Street lighting begins.
  - Pennsylvania Hospital founded
- 1753 – Bell hung in tower of State House
- 1755 – College of Philadelphia chartered
- 1757 – Amicable Library Co. founded.
- 1766
  - American Society for Promoting Useful Knowledge established.
  - Foundation of the city's first permanent theatre, the Southwark Theatre in Philadelphia
- 1767
  - January 6: Pennsylvania Chronicle newspaper begins publication
  - November: Dickinson's Letters from a Farmer in Pennsylvania begins publication
  - New Circulating Library in business.
- 1769 – American Philosophical Society formed.
- 1771
  - Carpenters' Hall in use.
  - Pennsylvania Packet newspaper begins publication
  - Friendly Sons of Saint Patrick founded
- 1773 – Walnut Street Jail in operation.
- 1774
  - First Troop Philadelphia City Cavalry organized
  - September 5: First Continental Congress of the United Colonies begins meeting in Carpenters' Hall
- 1775
  - April 14: Pennsylvania Abolition Society founded
  - May 10: Second Continental Congress of the Thirteen Colonies begins
  - July 6: Second Continental Congress issues Declaration of the Causes and Necessity of Taking Up Arms
  - Samuel Powel becomes mayor
  - The United States Marine Corps founded in Tun Tavern
- 1776
  - January 10: Thomas Paine's Common Sense published
  - July 4: United States Declaration of Independence signed in the Pennsylvania State House
  - December 12: threat of British occupation of Philadelphia prompts Congress to move to Baltimore at Henry Fite House for two months
- 1777
  - March 5: Congress returns to Philadelphia
  - September 11: British victory at the Battle of Brandywine forces Congress to flee from Philadelphia to Lancaster, and then York. Pro-Revolutionary civilians also flee.
  - September 23: British troops occupy Philadelphia, greeted by Loyalist civilians
- 1778
  - June 18: British troops abandon Philadelphia in order to defend New York City; Continental Army forces retake Philadelphia the same day
  - July 2: Congress returns to Philadelphia
- 1781
  - March 1: Congress of the Confederation replaces Second Continental Congress
  - The Religious Society of Free Quakers founded
- 1783
  - June 20: Pennsylvania Mutiny of 1783
  - June 22: Congress flees to Princeton, New Jersey, due to the Pennsylvania Munity
- 1784
  - Charles Willson Peale's Philadelphia Museum founded
  - Dock Street laid out.
- 1785 – Philadelphia Society for Promoting Agriculture instituted
- 1786
  - Labor strike by printers.
  - Philadelphia Dispensary established.
- 1787
  - May–September: U.S. Constitutional Convention held
  - College of Physicians, Free African Society, and Philadelphia Society for Alleviating the Miseries of Public Prisons founded
- 1790
  - November: George Washington moves into President's House on High Street
  - December 6: United States capital relocates to Philadelphia from New York City for a period of 10 years as the new national capital is constructed in Washington, D.C.
  - Philadelphia Stock Exchange founded
  - General Advertiser newspaper begins publication
  - Population: 28,522.
- 1791
  - City Hall building constructed; U.S. Supreme Court convenes.
  - University of Pennsylvania established
- 1792
  - Philadelphia Medical Society incorporated
  - Philadelphia Mint building constructed.
  - Construction started for the new President's House on Ninth Street.
- 1793 – Yellow Fever Epidemic
- 1794
  - Mother Bethel African Methodist Episcopal Church, Society for the Information and Assistance of Emigrants, and Byberry Library established
- 1798 – Bank of the United States opens.
- 1800 – United States capital relocates from Philadelphia to Washington, D.C.

== 19th century ==
- 1801
  - Chamber of Commerce established.
  - St. Augustine Church built.
  - The Port Folio magazine begins publication.
- 1802
  - University of Pennsylvania starts classes in the President's House at its Ninth Street Campus.
- 1805
  - Pennsylvania Academy of the Fine Arts founded.
  - Arch Street Friends Meeting House built.
- 1806 – U.S. Supreme Court decides Commonwealth v. Pullis, criminalizing labor strikes.
- 1807 – First African Presbyterian Church founded.
- 1809 – First African Baptist Church founded.
- 1810
  - Columbian Garden opens on Market Street.
  - Population: 53,722.
- 1811 – Girard Bank founded.
- 1812
  - Colossus Bridge built near city.
  - Wooden pipes installed to carry water through the city.
  - Pennsylvania's capital moved to Harrisburg.
- 1813 – Analectic Magazine begins publication.
- 1814 – Athenaeum of Philadelphia founded.
- 1816 – African Methodist Episcopal Church (denomination) and Philadelphia Saving Fund Society founded.
- 1817 – Academy of Natural Sciences incorporated.
- 1820 – Apprentices' Library Company founded.
- 1821 – Mercantile Library Company and Philadelphia College of Pharmacy established.
- 1822
  - Chestnut Street Theatre built.
  - Volunteer Corps of Light Infantry and Southwark Library established.
- 1824
  - Historical Society of Pennsylvania and Franklin Institute and American Sunday School Union established.
- 1825 - Erie Canal opened.
- 1826 – The Casket magazine begins publication.
- 1827 – Pennsylvania Horticultural Society established.
- 1828 – Register of Pennsylvania begins publication.
- 1829
  - Pennsylvania Inquirer newspaper begins publication.
  - Eastern State Penitentiary built.
- 1830 – Population: 80,462.
  - September: first national colored convention at Mother Bethel A.M.E. Church, Philadelphia
- 1831
  - June: first annual Convention of the People of Color at the Wesleyan Church, Philadelphia
  - Baldwin Locomotive Works and Philadelphia Glee Association established.
- 1833
  - August: third annual Convention for the Improvement of the Free People of Color, Philadelphia
  - December: American Anti-Slavery Society organized.
- 1834 – Philadelphia and Columbia Railroad and Merchants' Exchange Building constructed.
- 1835 – June: 1835 Philadelphia general strike.
- 1836 – Public Ledger newspaper begins publication.
- 1837
  - Institute for Colored Youth founded.
  - Ladies' Garland magazine and Burton's Gentleman's Magazine begin publication.
- 1842
  - Lombard Street Riot.
  - Augustinian College of Vilanova founded near city.
- 1844 – May–July: Philadelphia Nativist Riots.
- 1845 – American Literary Union organized.
- 1848
  - Philadelphia School of Design for Women founded.
  - Girard College opens.
  - St. Augustine Church rebuilt.
- 1850 – Population: 121,376
- 1852 – AME Christian Recorder newspaper begins publication.
- 1854
  - October: National Women's Rights Convention held.
  - City expands to encompass all of Philadelphia County, including: Aramingo Borough, Belmont District, Blockley Township, Bridesburg Borough, Bristol Township, Byberry Township, Delaware Township, Frankford Borough, Germantown Borough, Germantown Township, Kensington District, Kingsessing Township, Lower Dublin Township, Manayunk Borough, Moreland Township, Moyamensing District, Northern Liberties District, Northern Liberties Township, Oxford Township, Passyunk Township, Penn District, Penn Township, Philadelphia City, Roxborough Township, Richmond District, Southwark District, Spring Garden District, West Philadelphia Borough, and Whitehall Borough.
  - YMCA Philadelphia and Western Library Association of Philadelphia founded.
- 1855 – Girard Avenue Bridge built.
- 1856
  - April 12: The 1856 Philadelphia tornado occurred.
  - June: Republican National Convention held
- 1857
  - Academy of Music building constructed
  - Library & Reading Room Assoc. founded.
- 1858 – Mütter Museum established
- 1860
  - June 9: Japanese embassy arrives.
  - Philadelphia Sketch Club organized.
  - Population: 565,529.
  - McGillin's Olde Ale House opened on Drury Street. McGillin's is the oldest continuously operating tavern in Philadelphia and one of the oldest in the country.
- 1862
  - Photographic Society of Philadelphia and Union League of Philadelphia founded.
  - William Cramp & Sons shipbuilders in business.
- 1864
  - Pennsylvania Equal Rights League headquartered in city.
  - Philadelphia Photographer magazine begins publication.
  - Cathedral Basilica of Saints Peter and Paul built.
  - June: Sanitary Fair held.
- 1865
  - Benjamin Guggenheim was an American businessman who was born in Philadelphia and died aboard RMS Titanic when the ship sank in the North Atlantic Ocean. His body was never recovered.
- 1866
  - August: National Union Convention held.
  - Birely, Hillman & Streaker (shipbuilders) and Green's Hotel in business.
  - Chestnut Street Bridge opens.
- 1868 – Strawbridge & Clothier in business.
- 1869
  - Knights of Labor established.
  - N.W. Ayer in business.
- 1870 – Population: 674,022.
- 1873
  - Philadelphia Fire Department established.
  - Masonic Temple built.
  - Dutrieuille caterers in business.
- 1874 – Philadelphia Zoo opens.
- 1876
  - May 10: Centennial International Exhibition opens.
  - Workingmen's Party of America founded in Philadelphia.
- 1877 – Pennsylvania Museum and School of Industrial Art opens.
- 1878 – October 24: Storm.
- 1882
  - Philadelphia Association of Textile Manufacturers formed.
  - October - Celebration of the bi-centennial of the landing of William Penn.
- 1883 – Philadelphia Phillies baseball team formed.
- 1884
  - Starr Centre founded.
  - Post Office opens on 9th Street
- 1887 – September: U.S. Constitution centennial.
- 1889 - The Park Theatre at the corner of at the corner of Broad St. and Fairmont Ave. opens on September 16, 1889.
- 1890
  - Mother Bethel A.M.E. Church built.
  - Population: 1,046,964.
  - Frankford Camera Club organized.
- 1891
  - December 17: Drexel University is founded.
  - Free Library of Philadelphia and Geographical Club of Philadelphia established.
- 1892
  - Electric trolley begins operating.
  - Genealogical Society of Pennsylvania founded.
- 1893
  - Reading Terminal station opens.
  - Wilstach Gallery opens in West Fairmount Park.
- 1897 – American Negro Historical Society and Berean Manual Training and Industrial School established.
- 1898 – October: Peace Jubilee held.
- 1899 – Penn Museum building constructed.
- 1900
  - June: 1900 Republican National Convention held.
  - Philadelphia Orchestra founded.
  - North American Building constructed.
  - Population: 1,293,697.

== 20th century ==
- 1901 Philadelphia Mummers are inaugurated
- Philadelphia Athletics are formed
- Philadelphia City Hall built
- 1902
  - Automat eatery in business.
  - Corn Exchange National Bank building constructed.
  - Violinist and composer Frederick E. Hahn founds the Hahn Conservatory of Music in Philadelphia.
- 1903 – Textile strike.
- 1905 – City Club of Philadelphia chartered.
- 1907
  - Broad Street Subway begins operation.
  - March 7: Market Street Subway begins operation.
- 1908 - Celebration of the 225th anniversary of the foundation of the city.
- 1909 – Bureau of Municipal Research established.
- 1910
- Philadelphia Athletics win World Series over Chicago Cubs
  - Philadelphia general strike (1910)
  - Population: 1,549,008.
- 1911 Philadelphia Athletes win World Series over New York Giants
- 1913 Philadelphia Athletics win World Series over New York Giants
- 1914 – Empress Theater and Christian Street YMCA open.
- 1915
  - Martin Nodell was born in Philadelphia.
  - South 9th Street Italian Market chartered
- 1917
  - American Stores Company in business.
  - Hahn Conservatory of Music merges into the Philadelphia Musical Academy
- 1918
  - September 19: The Spanish Flu hits through the Philadelphia Navy Yard from sailors returning from Europe
  - September 28: Liberty Loan Parade leads to explosion of influenza
  - October: Spanish flu explodes in Philadelphia killing 12,000 and sickening over 48,000
- 1919
  - July: Racial unrest.
  - Aero Service Corporation in business.
- 1920
  - Carman Theatre opens on November 25, 1920
  - Colored Dunbar Theatre built (approximate date).
  - Population: 1,823,779.
- 1921 – Municipal piers built on Delaware River.
- 1923 – Philadelphia trolley bus (trackless trolley) system opens.
- 1924 – Curtis Institute of Music established.
- 1925 – Philadelphia Daily News begins publication.
- 1926
  - Roosevelt Theatre and Benjamin Franklin Bridge to Camden, New Jersey, open.
  - May 31: Sesquicentennial Exposition opens.
- 1927
  - Philadelphia Municipal Airport dedicated.
  - Parkway Central Library opens.
- 1928
  - Forrest Theatre and Boyd Theatre open.
  - Philadelphia Museum of Art building constructed.
- 1929
- Philadelphia Athletics win World Series over Chicago Cubs
  - Uptown Theater opens.
  - Rodin Museum dedicated.
- 1930 – Population: 1,950,961.
- Pat’s King of Steaks opens. Inventor/originator of cheese steaks
- Philadelphia Athletics win World Series over St Louis Cardinals
- 1931
  - Municipal Auditorium opens.
  - Girard Trust Building constructed
  - Philadelphia Society for the Preservation of Landmarks founded
- 1932
  - Philadelphia Saving Fund Society Building constructed.
  - Market Street Bridge rebuilt
- 1933
  - Pennsylvania Station–30th Street opens.
  - Philadelphia Eagles, a National Football League team, founded
- 1935 – United States Post Office-Main Branch built
- 1936 – Democratic National Convention held.
- 1937 – Philadelphia Housing Authority established.
- 1938 – Jack and Jill (organization) founded.
- 1940
  - Philadelphia Transportation Company begins operation, replacing the Philadelphia Rapid Transit Company
  - Population: 1,931,334.
  - Philadelphia International Airport opens
- 1941
  - Philadelphia History Museum dedicated
  - WPTZ-TV Channel 3 becomes the first television station to sign on the air.
- 1943 – September 6: Frankford Junction train wreck
- 1944 – August: Philadelphia transit strike of 1944
- 1945 – Philadelphia Northeast Airport opens.
- 1946
  - University of Pennsylvania's ENIAC computer introduced.
  - Links women's club founded.
- 1947 - May: WFIL-TV Channel 6 signs on the air.
- 1948
  - May: WCAU-TV Channel 10 signs on the air.
  - June: 1948 Republican National Convention held.
- Philadelphia Eagles win first championship (pre-Super Bowl) over Chicago Cardinals
- 1949 – Philadelphia Textile Institute established.
- Philadelphia Eagles win second championship (pre-Super Bowl) over LA Rams
- 1950
  - Philadelphia Civic Grand Opera Company active.
  - Population: 2,071,605.
- 1952 – Philadelphia City Archives established.
- American Bandstand premiers with host Bob Horn
- 1954 Philadelphia Athletics move to Kansas City
- 1955 – Philadelphia Historical Commission and Foreign Policy Research Institute established.
- Syracuse Nationals (76ers) win NBA championship over Fort Wayne Pistons
- 1956 – Independence National Historical Park established
- 1957 - WHYY-TV Channel 12 signs on the air.
- 1958
  - Philadelphia Lyric Opera Company active
  - Japanese House and Garden installed in West Fairmount Park
  - Robert Nix becomes U.S. representative for Pennsylvania's 4th congressional district.
- Philadelphia Eagles win 3rd championship (pre-Super Bowl) over Green Bay Packers
- 1960 - July: WPCA-TV Channel 17 signs on the air.
- 1962
  - March: Wilt Chamberlain of the Warriors scores 100 points against New York Knicks
  - August: WPCA Channel 17 went dark.
- 1963 – Syracuse Nationals move to Philadelphia and become the Philadelphia 76ers
- 1964
  - August: 1964 Philadelphia race riot.
  - Society Hill Towers built
  - Sister city relationship established with Florence, Italy.
- 1965
- Mike Douglas show airs from Philadelphia.
  - JFK Plaza constructed.
  - Delaware Valley Regional Planning Commission and Society Hill Civic Association formed.
  - May: WIBF-TV Channel 29 signs on the air.
  - September: Channel 17 returns to the air, this time under its new call letters WPHL-TV.
- 1966 – Sister city relationship established with Tel Aviv, Israel.
- 1967
- 76ers win 2nd NBA championship over San Francisco Warriors
  - Temple University's Urban Archives (of Philadelphia) established.
  - Philadelphia Flyers NHL team founded.
- 1968
  - SEPTA takes over the Philadelphia Transportation Company
  - Philadelphia Boys Choir founded.
- 1970
  - September: Revolutionary People's Constitutional Convention held in city.
  - Le Bec-Fin restaurant in business.
  - Population: 1,948,609.
- 1971 – Mariposa Food Co-op established.
- 1972
  - Frank Rizzo becomes mayor.
  - One Meridian Plaza built.
- 1973 Atoms win NASL championship over Dallas Tornadoes
- 1974
  - Philadelphia Green launched.
  - Philadelphia Flyers win 1st Stanley cup over Boston Bruins
- 1975 Philadelphia Flyers win 2nd Stanley cup over Buffalo Sabers
  - August: 1975 Philadelphia Refinery Fire.
  - Opera Company of Philadelphia formed.
- 1976
  - African American Museum in Philadelphia and National Museum of American Jewish History established.
  - Gray's Ferry Bridge opens.
  - Sister city relationship established with Toruń, Poland.
- January 9: The filming of Rocky begins
- July 4: The Bicentennial Celebration, with a visit from U.S. President Gerald Ford.
- Mummers Museum opens up
- 1977 – The Gallery at Market East shopping mall opens.
- 1980
  - Population: 1,688,210.
  - March 21: Angelo Bruno assassinated outside his home. The murder was orchestrated by his consigliere, Antonio Caponigro, who was unhappy with Bruno's conservative leadership style and had been led to believe that, if he attempted a coup, he would have the support of the Genovese crime family. That April, Caponigro visited New York City, apparently under the assumption he was about to be confirmed as boss. Instead, he was tortured and murdered.
  - Sister city relationship established with Tianjin, China.
  - Philadelphia Phillies win the World Series.
- 1981
  - Philadelphia City Paper begins publication.
  - June: WWSG-TV Channel 57 signs on the air.
  - July 13: WRBV-TV Channel 65 signs on the air.
  - July 29: WWAC-TV Channel 53 signs on the air.
- 1983
  - SEPTA Regional Rail begins operating.
  - Philadelphia 76ers win 3rd NBA championship over Lakers
  - November 8: Wilson Goode is elected as the first African-American mayor.
- 1984
  - Philadelphia Stars of USFL win USFL championship over Arizona Wranglers
  - Market East Station (now Jefferson Station) and Center City Commuter Connection open.
  - Ashram established by Prakashanand Saraswati.
  - Sister city relationship established with Incheon, South Korea.
  - January 2: Wilson Goode is sworning in as the first African-American mayor.
- 1985 – The MOVE bombing in West Philadelphia kills 11 people and destroys about 60 homes.
- 1986
  - Sister city relationship established with Douala, Cameroon.
- 1987
  - One Liberty Place built.
  - The Roots (band) formed.
- 1989 – Dock Street Brewing Company pub in business.
- 1990 – Population: 1,585,577.
- 1992
  - First Friday begins in Old Town.
  - Sister city relationship established with Nizhny Novgorod, Russia.
  - Ed Rendell becomes mayor of Philadelphia.
- 1993
  - Pennsylvania Convention Center opens.
- 1994
  - June 24 - The first Hostile City Showdown professional wrestling event held at the ECW Arena.
  - August 13 - The first Hardcore Haven professional wrestling event held at the ECW Arena.
- 1995 – Chaka Fattah becomes Pennsylvania's 2nd congressional district representative.
- 1996
  - City website online (approximate date).
  - Wilma Theater and CoreStates Center (arena) open.
- 1997 – October 25: National Million Woman March held in city.
- 1998 – Bob Brady becomes Pennsylvania's 1st congressional district representative.
- 1999
  - March 28: Wrestlemania XV is held at First Union Center.
  - November 2: John F. Smith is elected as the city's second African-American mayor.
- 2000
  - May 18: Philadelphia Pier 34 collapse.
  - December 28: Lex Street massacre.
  - January 2: John F. Street sworns in as the city's second African-America mayor.
  - March 8-11: Atlantic 10 men's basketball tournament held at First Union Spectrum.
  - July 31-August 3: Republican National Convention held at First Union Center in Philadelphia.
  - Population: 1,517,550.

== 21st century ==
- 2001 – Kimmel Center for the Performing Arts opens.
- 2003
  - August 3: Lincoln Financial Field opens.
  - October 9: Liberty Bell Center opens.
- 2004
  - Iraq Veterans Against the War headquartered in Philadelphia.
  - Citizens Bank Park opens.
- 2005
  - July 2: Live 8, a worldwide concert takes places on the Benjamin Franklin Parkway. Over 600 thousand people attended.
  - July 4: Philadelphia Freedom Concert held.
  - September 4: SEPTA gains its first heritage trolley line, route 15. The route is operated by rebuilt street cars from the late 40's
- 2008
  - Philadelphia Soul win their first ArenaBowl Championship over San Jose Saber Cats
  - Michael Nutter becomes mayor.
  - Comcast Center built.
  - The Philadelphia Phillies defeat the Tampa Bay Rays to win the 2008 World Series.
- 2010 – Population: 1,526,006; metro 5,965,343.
- 2011
  - October: Occupy Philadelphia begins.
  - Population: 1,536,471; metro 5,992,414.
- 2012
  - City open data and government transparency order enacted.
  - Barnes Foundation relocates to the Parkway.
- 2013
  - June 5: Building collapse in Center City.
- 2015
  - May 12: 2015 Philadelphia train derailment.
  - August 4: HitchBOT dies and beheaded in here.
  - September: Pope Francis' visit to the United States, concluding with the visit to Philadelphia, for the 2015 World Meeting of Families.
- 2016
- Philadelphia Soul win their 2nd ArenaBowl championship over Arizona Rattlers
  - January 4: Jim Kenney becomes mayor of Philadelphia.
  - July: 2016 Democratic National Convention held in city.
- 2017 Philadelphia Soul win their 3rd ArenaBowl Championship over Tampa Bay Storm
- 2018
  - February 4: The Philadelphia Eagles defeat the New England Patriots 41–33 to win Super Bowl LII, their first Super Bowl win.
  - July 2018: Comcast Innovation and Technology Center opens.
- 2019
  - June 21: The 2019 Philadelphia refinery explosion
  - September 19: The Fashion District Philadelphia opens at the site of The Gallery at Market East.
- 2020
  - March 2020: Philadelphia was hardest-hit by COVID-19 pandemic, which put few thousands of residents out of work, and shifted others to work at home.
  - October 26: Walter Wallace, a black man in Philadelphia is killed by police and rioting starts on the day of his death.
- 2021
  - January 20: Joe Biden becomes the first President of the United States from the Greater Philadelphia Area
  - October 13: Woman raped on SEPTA train, perceived delayed response by bystanders sparks debate.
- 2022
  - January 5: Thirteen people die and two others are injured in a fire at a converted apartment complex in the Fairmount neighborhood of Philadelphia.
  - June 5: A mass shooting occurs on South street which results in the deaths of 3 and injury of 11.
- 2023
  - June 11: Portion of the I-95 highway collapses due to a tanker crash and fire in the Tacony neighborhood of Philadelphia, shutting down interstate traffic in both directions. Governor Shapiro declares State of Emergency to secure funds to rebuild the overpass.
- 2025
  - January 31: Med Jets Flight 056, a Learjet 55 operated by Jet Rescue Air Ambulance, crashed shortly after takeoff from Northeast Philadelphia Airport, resulting in seven fatalities and 19 injuries. The aircraft was en route to Tijuana International Airport, with a planned stop at Springfield–Branson National Airport.
  - July 1 - July 9: AFSCME District Council 33 strike

== See also ==
- History of Philadelphia
- List of mayors of Philadelphia
- Philadelphia Register of Historic Places
- National Register of Historic Places listings in Philadelphia, Pennsylvania
- History of rail transport in Philadelphia
- Sister city timelines: Aix-en-Provence, Douala, Florence, Frankfurt, Kobe, Nizhny Novgorod, Tel Aviv
- Timelines of other cities in Pennsylvania: Pittsburgh
- Timeline of women's suffrage in Pennsylvania
- Pennsylvania State Equal Rights League Convention

== Bibliography ==
- S.S. Moore; T.W. Jones (1804), Traveller's Directory... Philadelphia to New York (2nd ed.), Philadelphia: Mathew Carey, OCLC 9501780, OL 23720368M
- Views in Philadelphia and its Vicinity, Philadelphia: C.G. Childs, 1827, OCLC 9146906, OL 24131130M
- Philadelphia in 1830-1, Philadelphia: E.L. Carey and A. Hart, 1830
- Philadelphia As It Is, Philadelphia: P.J. Gray, 1834, OL 22889533M
- McElroy's Philadelphia City Directory for 1867. 1837.
- "Philadelphia (2.)" . Encyclopædia Britannica. Vol. 18 (9th ed.). 1885.
- Albert H. Smyth (1892). The Philadelphia magazines and their contributors, 1741–1850. Philadelphia: R.M. Lindsay.
- John Russell Young, ed. (1898), Memorial History of the City of Philadelphia, vol. 2, New York City: New-York History Company
- James G. Barnwell (April 1900), "Proprietary Libraries in Philadelphia", Library Journal, 25, hdl:2027/mdp.39015036908088
- R.R. Wright, ed. (1907). Philadelphia Colored Directory. ISBN 9780598574510.
- "Philadelphia (Pennsylvania)" . Encyclopædia Britannica. Vol. 21 (11th ed.). 1910. pp. 367–373.
- Benjamin Vincent (1910), "Philadelphia", Haydn's Dictionary of Dates (25th ed.), London: Ward, Lock & Co.
- John Van Ness Ingram (1912). "(Philadelphia)". A Check List of American Eighteenth Century Newspapers in the Library of Congress.
- Market Street, Philadelphia: The Most Historic Highway in America, Its Merchants and Its Story. Philadelphia: Joseph Jackson. 1918.
- McKinley, Albert Edward (1922). "Philadelphia" . Encyclopædia Britannica. Vol. 32 (12th ed.).
- Federal Writers' Project (1937), "Chronology", Philadelphia, a Guide to the Nation's Birthplace, American Guide Series, Philadelphia: William Penn Association of Philadelphia
- Dennis Clark (1973), The Irish in Philadelphia, Philadelphia: Temple University Press, ISBN 0877220573
- Fredric Miller (1983). "Documenting Modern Cities: The Philadelphia Model". The Public Historian. 5 (2): 75–86. doi:10.2307/3377252. JSTOR 3377252.
- Michael P. McCarthy (1990). "Traditions in Conflict: The Philadelphia City Hall Site Controversy". Pennsylvania History. 57 (4): 301–317. JSTOR 27773404.
- Bruce J. Evensen (1993). "'Saving the City's Reputation': Philadelphia's Struggle over Self-Identity, Sabbath-Breaking and Boxing in America's Sesquicentennial Year". Pennsylvania History. 60 (1): 6–34. JSTOR 27773587.
- "Four Square Blocks: Philadelphia", The New York Times, October 9, 2013
