= Lex Street massacre =

Mass murder that took place in Philadelphia, Pennsylvania, US

Coordinates: 39.967°N 75.212°W

The Lex Street massacre is the name, given by a Philadelphia Daily News reporter, to a mass murder that took place in Philadelphia, Pennsylvania, United States on December 28, 2000. It was the deadliest mass murder in Philadelphia history. Ten people were shot in a drug house in the 800 block of Lex Street in West Philadelphia. Seven of them died.

== Victims ==
Of the deceased, six were male and one female, aged 15 to 54, all of African-American descent. Two men and one woman, the aunt of victim Tyrone Long, survived with severe injuries.

=== Fatalities ===
- Alfred Goodwin, 54
- Samuel "Malik" Harris Jr., 15
- George "Jig" Porter, a.k.a. George Gibson, 19
- Edward Sudler, 44
- Ronette Abrams, 33
- Calvin "CJ" Helton Jr., 19
- Tyrone Long Jr., 18

=== Injured ===
- Yvette Long, 33
- Bruce Carter, 45
- Craig Kilby, 37

== Suspects ==
The murders received substantial public attention, and four suspects, Jermel Lewis, Sacon Youk, Hezekiah Thomas and Quiante Perrin, were quickly charged and captured in January 2001. However, there was insufficient evidence for prosecution, and after 18 months in jail, charges were dropped. The men later sued for wrongful arrests, and eventually received a $1.9 million settlement from the city.

In 2002, four different men were charged in the case, brothers Dawud and Khalid Faruqi, who denied being involved in the murder, and Shihean Black and Bruce Veney, who pleaded guilty. All four were convicted March 8, 2004. The prosecution made a plea deal with the brothers: They were given life sentences rather than the death penalty. Black is serving multiple life terms, and Veney was sentenced to 15 to 30 years in exchange for testifying against the other three suspects; he drove the suspects to the scene but did not actually involve himself in the shooting.

Bruce Veney was paroled in March 2019.

== Cause ==
Originally, police had thought the shooting was due to a drug turf war, but in 2002, when the four guilty men were arrested, it was revealed that the issue was over a car. Black told police that he had traded a Chevrolet Corsica, along with $300, for a Dodge Intrepid belonging to George Gibson Porter (one of the victims). Porter did not know how to use the Corsica's stick shift and blew out the clutch. After these issues, Porter went to Dawud Faruqi, who had traded a pistol for the Dodge Intrepid. Porter wanted his Dodge back, but refused to pay for the damaged clutch on the Corsica. Reportedly, Porter took his car back the next day with an extra set of keys. It was this bad car deal that led to the shooting on December 28. Black told police that the night of the massacre was meant to gather or corral the victims, but when Dawud's mask fell off they began shooting to protect his identity. In the end, seven were dead and three were injured.

== 2007 book ==
The mass shooting was explored in a 2007 book titled The Lex Street Massacre: The True Story of the Worst Mass Murder in Philadelphia History, by Antonne Jones. It includes interviews from judges, lawyers, and the men convicted.
