= Antonne Jones =

American film producer

Antonne Marquis Jones (born April 23, 1972) is an American book publisher, author, screenwriter, and film producer. He is best known for writing and publishing urban fictional literature 'street lit' during the late 1990s.

== Early life ==
Antonne Jones was born in Philadelphia, Pennsylvania, in 1972. His mother, Mardrena Jones was a legal secretary and writer born in Philadelphia. His father, Marvin Thomas was a SEPTA bus operator born in South Carolina and raised in Philadelphia.

Jones attended grammar school at Sacred Heart of Jesus a Roman Catholic High School in Center City, Philadelphia. At Roman he played basketball for two years.

== Early career ==
In 1997, Jones started his own publishing company, ELDON Publishing Company and released his first novel, The Family: A Philadelphia Mob Story, under his imprint in August 1999. In 2001, Jones would release the sequel, The Family II: Life after Death.

In 2007, Jones released his third book, the true crime thriller The Lex Street Massacre, which chronicled the worst mass murderer in Philadelphia history. The Lex Street massacre took place in 2000, when four young men were falsely accused of viciously killing 7 people in a dilapidated crack house in West Philadelphia. Despite a mound of evidence exonerating the young men of the murders, the Philadelphia District Attorney's office aggressively continued to seek the death penalty for these accused men.

In 2009, Jones partnered with Daymond John and started another publishing house called Display of Power Publishing. In April, the company released its first book, The Brand Within, by Daymond John and collaborator, Daniel Paisner.
