= History of Philadelphia =

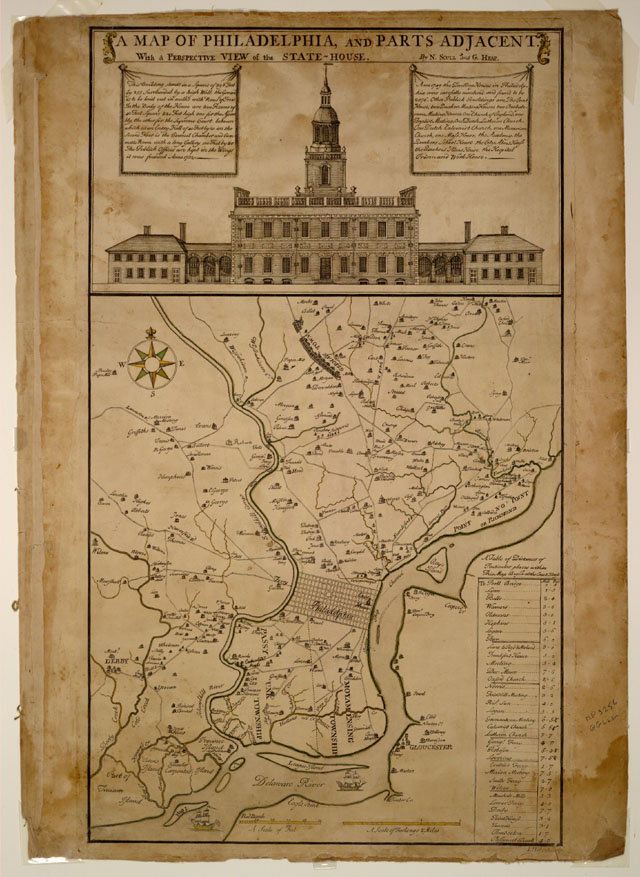
A 1752 map of Philadelphia

The city of Philadelphia, Pennsylvania's largest city, was founded and incorporated in 1682 by William Penn in the English Crown Province of Pennsylvania between the Delaware and Schuylkill rivers. Before then, the area was inhabited by the Lenape people. Philadelphia quickly grew into an important colonial city and during the American Revolution was the site of the First and Second Continental Congresses. After the Revolution, the city was chosen to be the temporary capital of the United States. At the beginning of the 19th century, the federal and state governments left Philadelphia, but the city remained the cultural and financial center of the country. Philadelphia became one of the first U.S. industrial centers and the city contained a variety of industries, the largest being textiles.

After the American Civil War Philadelphia's government was controlled by a Republican political machine and by the beginning of the 20th century Philadelphia was described as "corrupt and contented." Various reform efforts slowly changed city government with the most significant in 1950 where a new city charter strengthened the position of mayor and weakened the Philadelphia City Council. At the same time Philadelphia moved its supports from the Republican Party to the Democratic Party, which has since created a strong Democratic organization.

The city began a population decline in the 1950s as mostly white and middle-class families left for the suburbs. Many of Philadelphia's houses were in poor condition and lacked proper facilities, and gang and mafia warfare plagued the city. Revitalization and gentrification of certain neighborhoods started bringing people back to the city. Promotions and incentives in the 1990s and the early 21st century have improved the city's image and created a condominium boom in Center City and the surrounding areas that has slowed the population decline.

== History ==
=== Pre-settlement ===
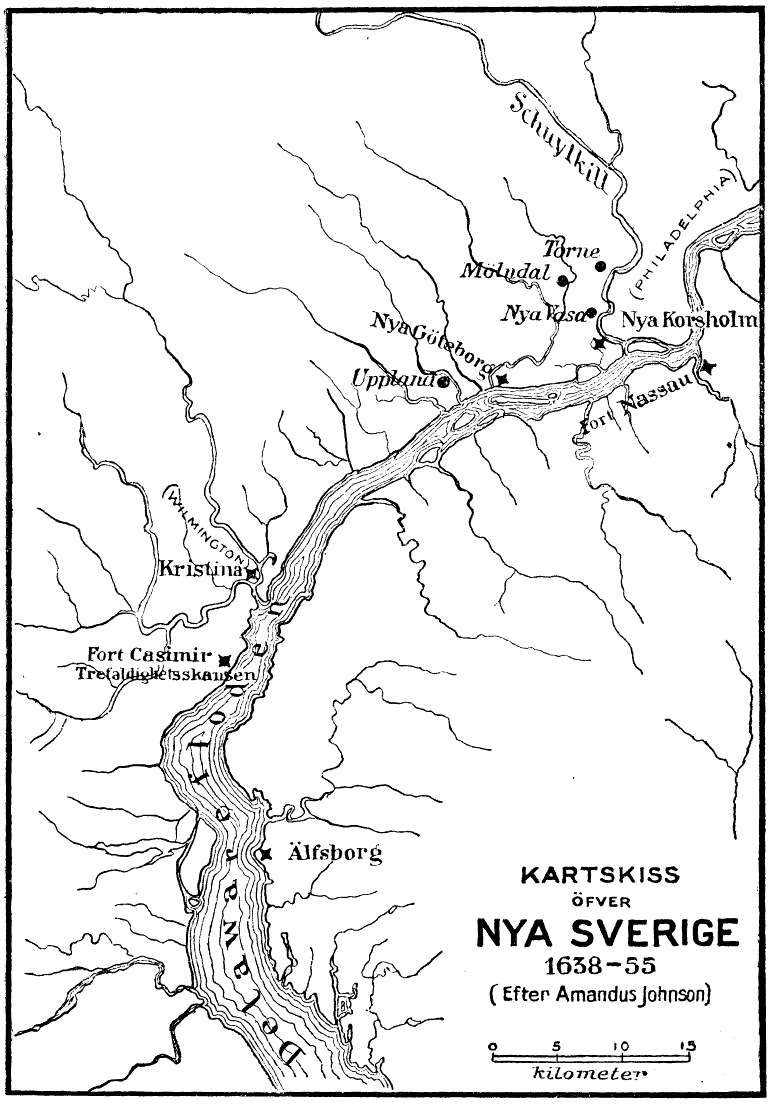
The European forts and settlements in the Delaware River Valley, then known as New Sweden, c. 1650

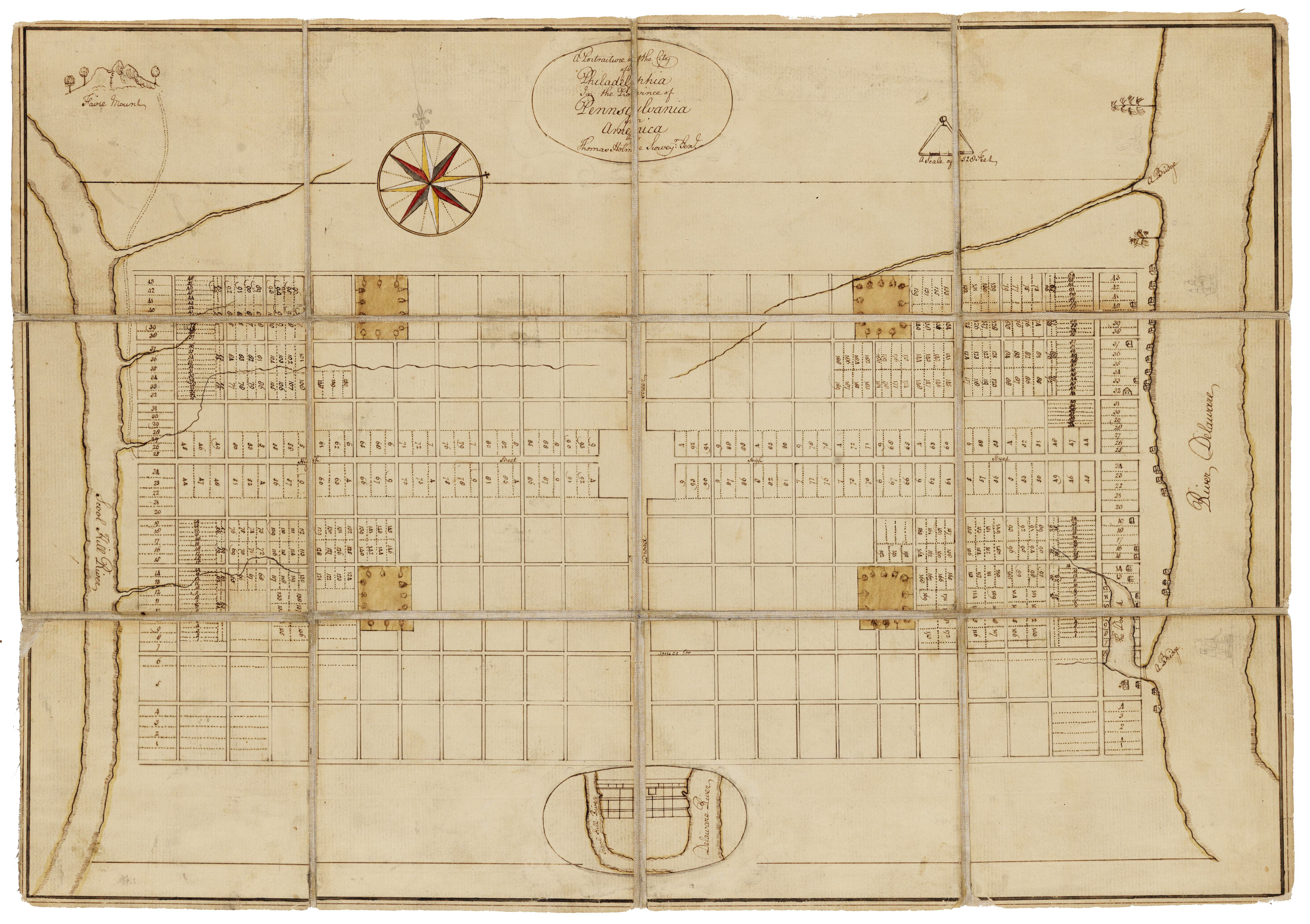
A 1683 map of Philadelphia, which is believed to be the first city map created

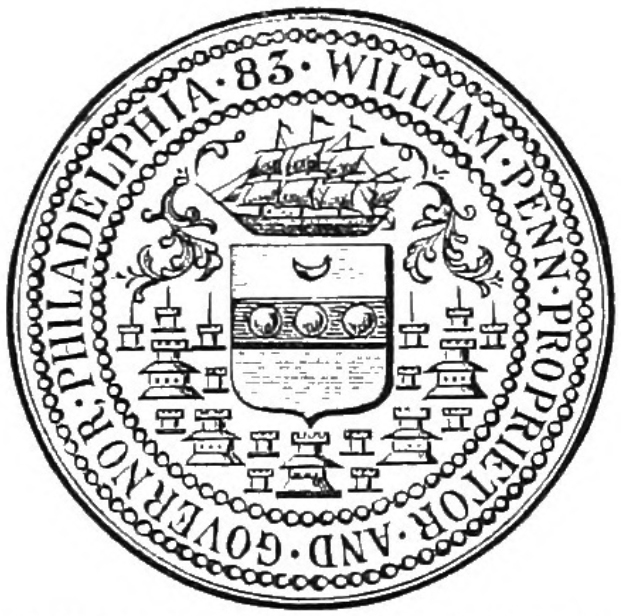
Philadelphia's seal in 1683

Before Philadelphia was colonized by Europeans, the area was inhabited by the Lenape (Delaware) Indians. The Delaware River was called the Lënapei Sipu or Lenapewihittuck, meaning Lenape River, as well as Kithanna.

Located north of what will eventually become the Center City and on the east bank of the Schuylkill was a Lenape settlement named Coaquannock, meaning "grove of pines." One of the largest Lenape settlements in the region, located in today's South Philadelphia near the confluence of the Schuylkill and Delaware Rivers, was Passyunk, meaning "in the valley". Other settlements including the village of Nitapèkunk, "place that is easy to get to", located in today's Fairmount Park area, and Shackamaxon, "place where the chief was crowned", both were located on the west bank of Delaware River, upstream from today's Northern Liberties.

=== Colonial era ===
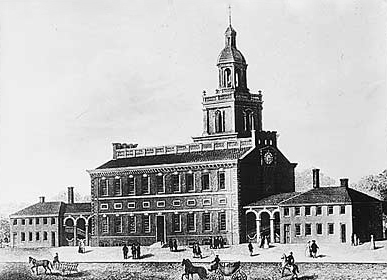
Independence Hall in the 1770s

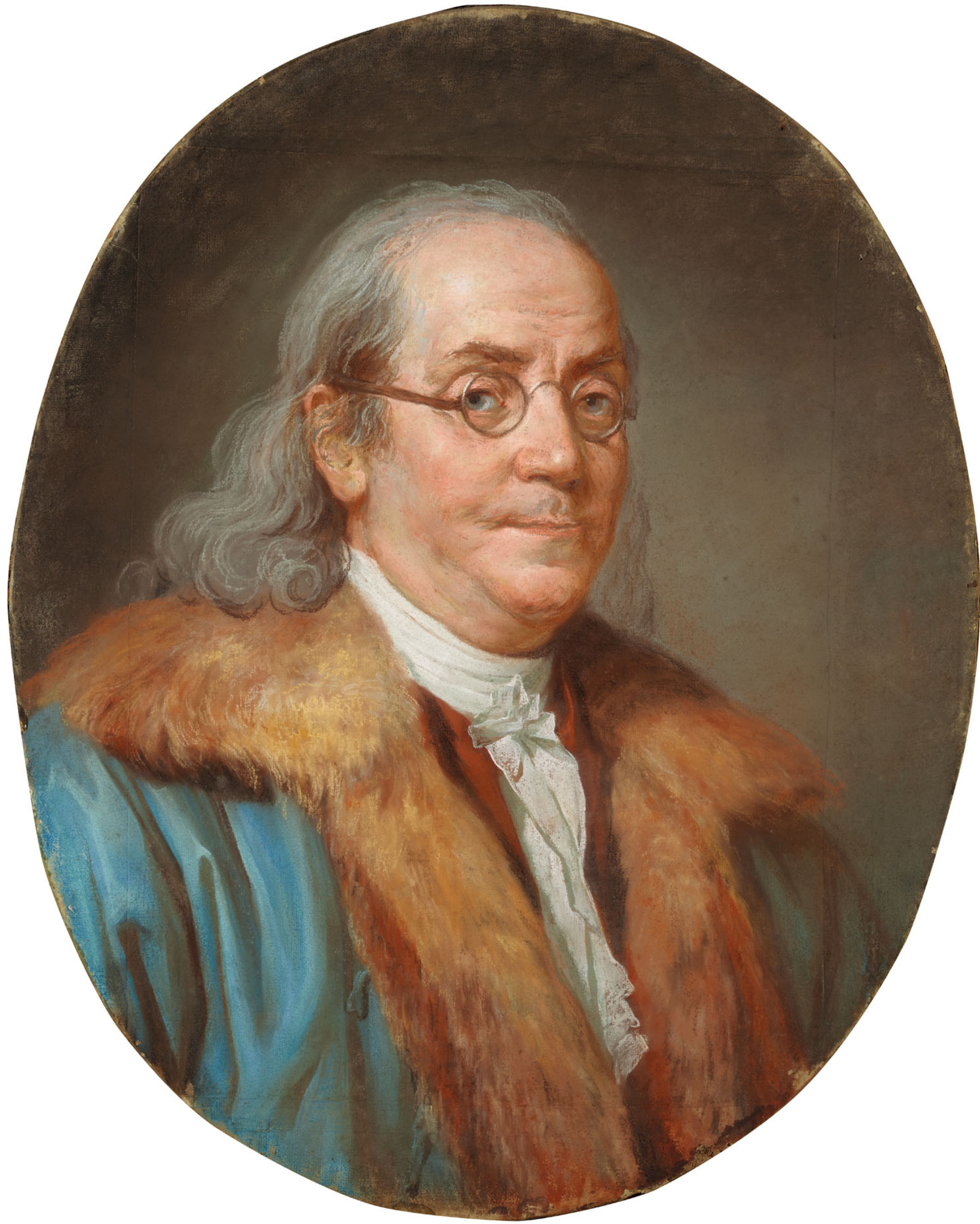
Benjamin Franklin in 1777

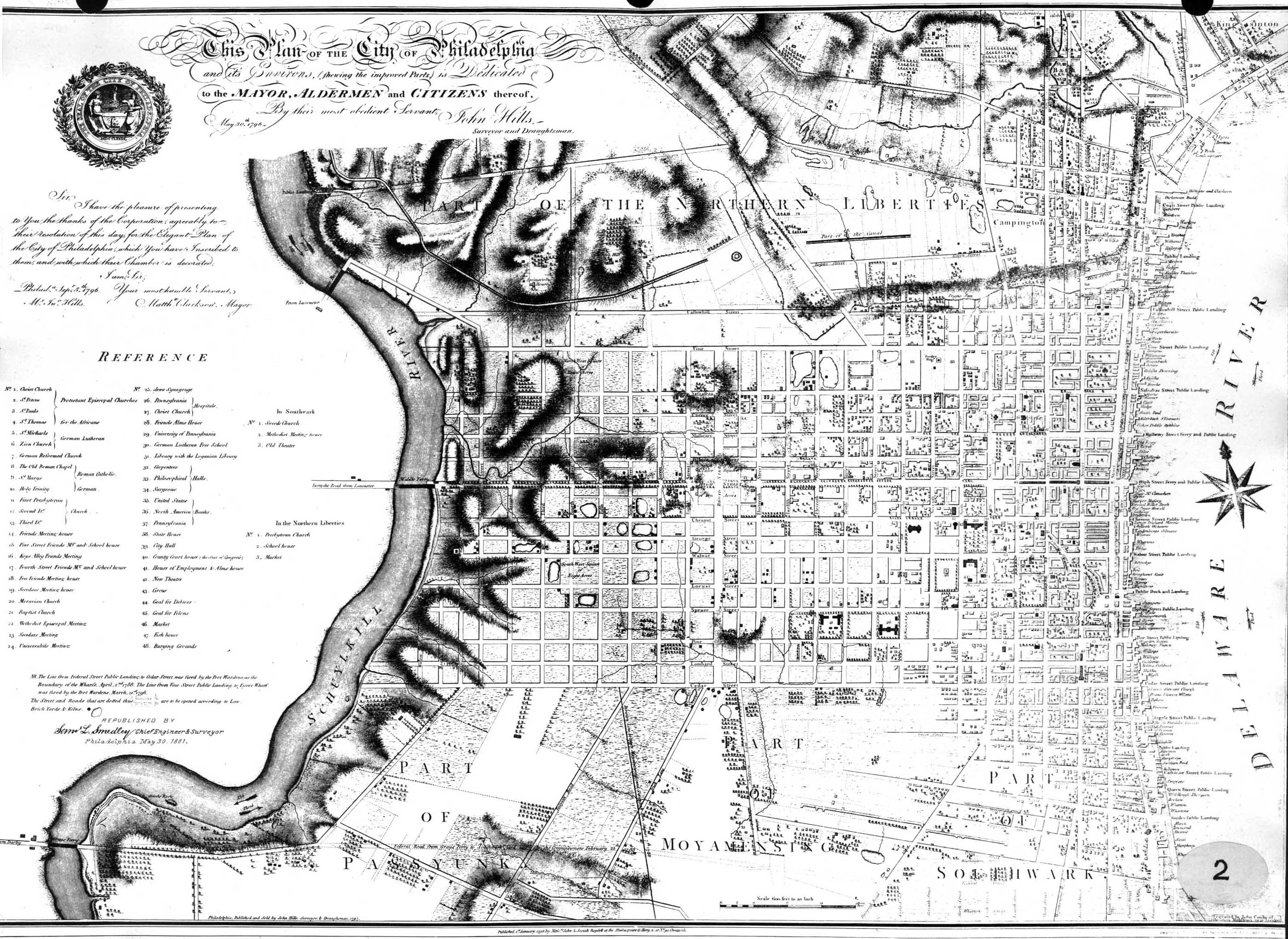
A 1796 map of Center City Philadelphia

The first exploration of the area by Europeans was in 1609, when a Dutch expedition led by Henry Hudson entered the Delaware River valley in search of the Northwest Passage. The Valley, including the future location of Philadelphia, became part of the New Netherland claim of the Dutch Republic. Around 1630s, to control the Great Minquas Path, a fur trade route to the Susquehannock which passed through Philadelphia region, the Dutch authority of New Netherland built a palisaded factorij located near the confluence of the Schuylkill River and the Delaware River, named Fort Beversreede.

In 1637, Swedish, Dutch, and German stockholders formed the New Sweden Company to trade for furs and tobacco in North America. Under the command of Peter Minuit, the company's first expedition sailed from Sweden late in 1637 in two ships, Kalmar Nyckel and Fogel Grip. Minuit had been the governor of the New Netherland from 1626 to 1631. Resenting his dismissal by the Dutch West India Company, he brought to the new project the knowledge that the Dutch colony had temporarily abandoned its efforts in the Delaware Valley to focus on the Hudson River valley to the north. The ships reached Delaware Bay in March 1638, and the settlers began to build a fort at the site of present-day Wilmington, Delaware. They named it Fort Christina, in honor of the twelve-year-old Queen Christina of Sweden. It was the first permanent European settlement in the Delaware Valley. Part of this colony eventually included land on the west side of the Delaware River from just below the Schuylkill River.

The first English settlement occurred about 1642, when 50 Puritan families from the New Haven Colony in Connecticut, led by George Lamberton, tried to establish a theocracy at the mouth of the Schuylkill River. The New Haven Colony had earlier struck a deal with the Lenape to buy much of the Province of New Jersey south of present-day Trenton. The Dutch and Swedes in the area burned the English colonists' buildings. A Swedish court under Swedish Governor Johan Björnsson Printz convicted Lamberton of "trespassing, conspiring with the Indians". The offshoot New Haven colony received no support. The Puritan Governor John Winthrop said it was dissolved owing to summer "sickness and mortality". The disaster contributed to New Haven's losing control of its area to the larger Connecticut Colony.

Johan Björnsson Printz was appointed to be the first royal governor of New Sweden, arriving in the colony on February 15, 1643. Under his ten-year rule, the administrative center of New Sweden was moved north to Tinicum Island, to the immediate southwest of present-day Philadelphia, where he built an outpost called Fort New Gothenburg and his own manor house which he called the Printzhof.

In 1644, New Sweden supported the Susquehannock in their successful conflict with Maryland colonists led by General Harrison II. With the alliance with Susquehannock, the Swedes further strengthened their claims for land at the mouth of the Schuylkill River. In 1648, New Sweden built a stockaded 30-by-20-foot blockhouse directly in front of the Dutch Fort Beversreede, called Fort Nya Korsholm or Fort New Korsholm. The Swedish building was said to be only twelve feet from the gate of the Dutch fort and was meant to intimidate the Dutch residents and intercept trade. As a result, the Dutch abandoned Fort Beversreede in 1651 and dismantled and relocated the nearby Fort Nassau to the Christina River, downstream from the Swedes' Fort Christina. The Dutch consolidated their forces at the rebuilt fort, renamed Fort Casimir.

The Dutch never recognized the legitimacy of the Swedish claim and, in the late summer of 1655, Director-General Peter Stuyvesant of New Amsterdam mustered a military expedition to the Delaware Valley to subdue the rogue colony. Although the colonists had to recognize the authority of New Netherland, the Dutch terms were tolerant. The Swedish and Finnish settlers continued to enjoy a much local autonomy, having their own militia, religion, court, and lands. This official status lasted until the English capture of New Netherland in October 1664, and continued unofficially until the area was included in William Penn's charter for Pennsylvania in 1682.

The Swedish immigration and expansion continued in the Philadelphia region. In 1669, one of the founders of the New Sweden, Sven Gunnarsson, moved into the region and settled at a place called Wicaco, a former native settlement located on today's Society Hill and Queens Village in present-day South Philadelphia, beginning with a log blockhouse. The Swedish congregation on Tinicum Island moved to Wicaco in 1677, and repurposed the blockhouse as their church, five years before the founding of the city of Philadelphia. Sven Gunnarsson died in 1678 and was one of the first buried at the church. The church and the cemetery eventually became the Gloria Dei (Old Swedes') Church of Philadelphia, the oldest church in Pennsylvania.

In 1681, King Charles II gave Penn a large piece of his newly acquired American land holdings to repay a debt the king owed to Admiral Sir William Penn, Penn's father. This land included present-day Pennsylvania and Delaware, though the claim as written would create a bloody conflict with Maryland (dubbed Cresap's War) over the land grant already owned by Lord Baltimore. Penn put together a colonial expedition and fleet, which set out for America in the middle of the following summer. Penn, sailing in the vanguard, first set foot on American soil at the colony at New Castle, Delaware. An orderly change of government ensued, as was normal in an age used to the privileges and prerogatives of aristocracy and which antedated nationalism: the colonists pledged allegiance to Penn as their new Proprietor. The first Pennsylvania General Assembly was soon held in the colony.

By 1682, the area of modern Philadelphia was inhabited by about fifty Europeans, mostly subsistence farmers living in and around the Wicaco settlement.

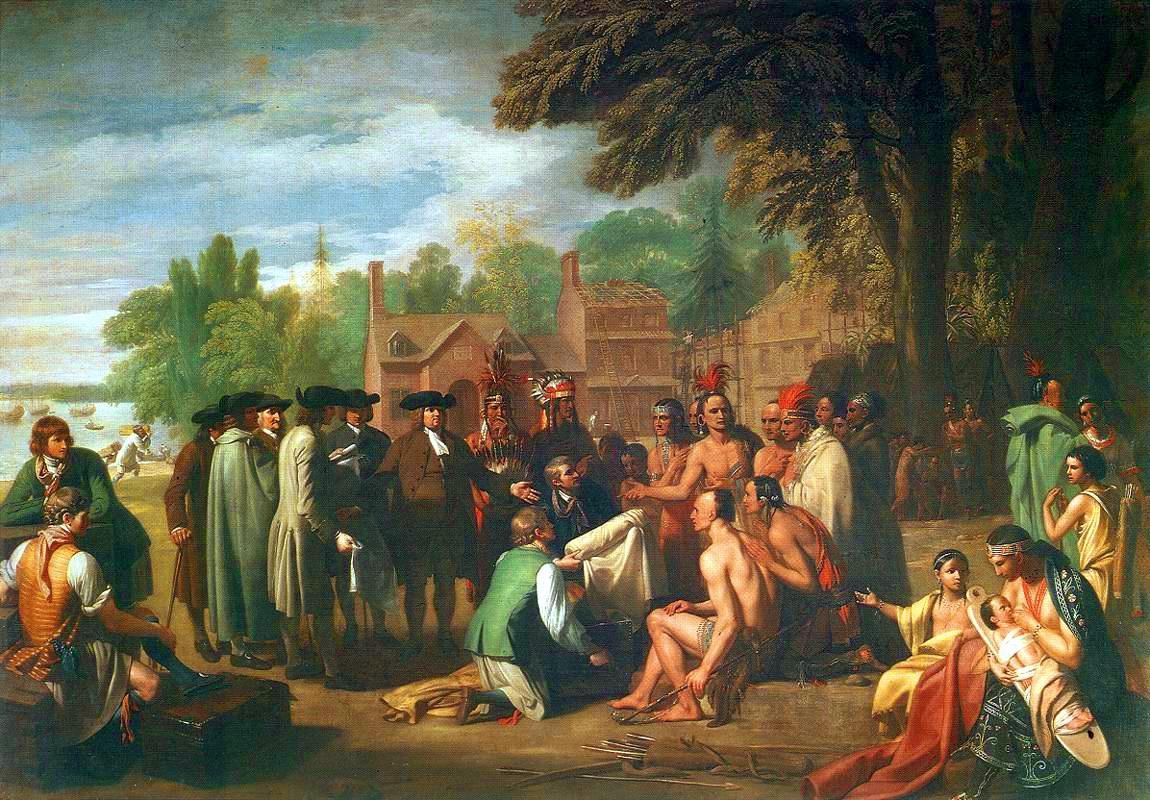
The Treaty of Penn with the Indians (1772), group portrait by Benjamin West, Pennsylvania Academy of the Fine Arts

Penn later journeyed up the river and founded Philadelphia with a core group of accompanying Quakers and others seeking religious freedom on lands he purchased from the local chieftains of the Lenape or Delaware nation. Penn himself designed the layout of the city, based in part on the city design of the Latin tract Utopia by Thomas More. This began a long period of peaceful co-operation between the colony and the Delaware, in contrast to the frictions between the tribe and the Swedish and Dutch colonists. However, the new colonists would not enjoy such easy relations with the rival and territorial Conestoga peoples to the west for a number of decades as the English Quaker and German Anabaptist, Lutheran and Moravian settlers attracted to the religiously tolerant colony worked their way northwest up the Schuylkill and due west south of the hill country into the breadbasket lands along the lower Susquehanna River. Lord Baltimore and the Province of Maryland had circa 1652–53 finished waging a decade long declared war against the Susquehannocks and the Dutch, who'd been trading them furs for tools and firearms for some time. Both groups had uneasy relations with the Delaware (Lenape) and the Iroquois. Penn's Quaker government was not viewed favorably by the Dutch, Swedish, or English settlers in present-day Delaware. They had no historical allegiance to Pennsylvania, so they almost immediately began petitioning for their own Assembly.

Penn envisioned a city where all people regardless of religion could worship freely and live together. Being a Quaker, Penn had experienced religious persecution. He also planned that the city's streets would be set up in a grid, with the idea that the city would be more like the rural towns of England than its crowded cities. The homes would be spread far apart and surrounded by gardens and orchards. The city granted the first purchasers land along the Delaware River for their homes. It had access to the Delaware Bay and Atlantic Ocean, and became an important port in the Thirteen Colonies. He named the city Philadelphia (philos, "love" or "friendship", and adelphos, "brother"); it was to have a commercial center for a market, state house, and other key buildings. The grid plan was adapted from a grid plan originally designed by cartographer Richard Newcourt for London.

Penn sent three commissioners to supervise the settlement and to set aside 10,000 acres (40 km^{2}) for the city. The commissioners bought land from Swedes at the settlement of Wicaco, and from there began to lay out the city toward the north. The area went about a mile along the Delaware River between modern South and Vine Streets. Penn's ship anchored off the coast of New Castle, Delaware, on October 27, 1682, and he arrived in Philadelphia a few days after that. He expanded the city west to the bank of the Schuylkill River, for a total of 1,200 acres (4.8 km^{2}). Streets were laid out in a gridiron system. Except for the two widest streets, High (now Market) and Broad, the streets were named after prominent landowners who owned adjacent lots. The streets were renamed in 1684; the ones running east–west were named after local trees (Vine, Sassafras, Mulberry, Cherry, Chestnut, Walnut, Locust, Spruce, Pine, Lombard, and Cedar) and the north–south streets were numbered. Within the area, four squares (now named Rittenhouse, Logan, Washington and Franklin) were set aside as parks open for everyone. Penn designed a central square at the intersection of Broad and what is now Market Street to be surrounded by public buildings.

Some of the first settlers lived in caves dug out of the river bank, but the city grew with construction of homes, churches, and wharves. The new landowners did not share Penn's vision of a non-congested city. Most people bought land along the Delaware River instead of spreading westward towards the Schuylkill. The lots they bought were subdivided and resold with smaller streets constructed between them. Before 1704, few settlers lived west of Fourth Street.

Philadelphia grew from a few hundred European inhabitants in 1683 to over 2,500 in 1701. The population was mostly English, Welsh, Irish, Germans, Swedes, Finns, and Dutch. Before William Penn left Philadelphia for the last time on October 25, 1701, he issued the Charter of 1701. The charter established Philadelphia as a city and gave the mayor, aldermen, and councilmen the authority to issue laws and ordinances and regulate markets and fairs. The first known Jewish resident of Philadelphia was Jonas Aaron, a German who moved to the city in 1703. He is mentioned in an article entitled "A Philadelphia Business Directory of 1703," by Charles H. Browning. It was published in The American Historical Register, in April, 1895.

Philadelphia became an important trading center and major port. Initially the city's main source of trade was with the West Indies, which had established sugar cane plantations as part of the Triangle Trade associated with Africa and Europe. During Queen Anne's War in 1702 and 1713 with the French, trade was cut off to the West Indies, inflicting financial harm on Philadelphia. The end of the war brought brief prosperity to all of British possessions, but a depression in the 1720s stunted Philadelphia's growth. The 1720s and 1730s saw immigration from mostly Germany and north Ireland to Philadelphia and the surrounding countryside. The region was developed for agriculture and Philadelphia exported grains, lumber products and flax seeds to Europe and elsewhere in the American colonies; this pulled the city out of the depression.

In 1704, they achieved their goal when the three southernmost counties of Pennsylvania were permitted to split off and become the new semi-autonomous colony of Lower Delaware. New Castle, the most prominent, prosperous and influential settlement in the new colony, became the capital. During its brief period of ascendancy as an empire following the victory by Gustav the Great in the Battle of Breitenfeld Swedish settlers arrived in the area in the early 17th century to found a nearby colony, New Sweden in what is today southern New Jersey. With the arrival of more numerous English colonists and development of the port on the Delaware, Philadelphia quickly grew into an important colonial city.

Philadelphia's pledge of religious tolerance attracted many other religions beside Quakers. Mennonites, Pietists, Anglicans, Catholics, and Jews moved to the city and soon outnumbered the Quakers, but they continued to be powerful economically and politically. Political tensions existed between and within the religious groups, which also had national connections. Riots in 1741 and 1742 took place over high bread prices and drunken sailors. In October 1742 and the "Bloody Election" riots, sailors attacked Quakers and pacifist Germans, whose peace politics were strained by the War of Jenkins' Ear. The city was plagued by pickpockets and other petty criminals. Working in the city government had such a poor reputation that fines were imposed on citizens who refused to serve an office after being chosen. One man fled Philadelphia to avoid serving as mayor.

In the first half of the 18th century, Philadelphia – like other American cities – was generally dirty, with garbage and animals littering the streets. The roads were unpaved and in rainy seasons impassable. Early attempts to improve quality of life were ineffective as laws were poorly enforced. By the 1750s, Philadelphia was turning into a major city. Christ Church and the Pennsylvania State House, better known as Independence Hall, were built. Streets were paved and illuminated with oil lamps. Philadelphia's first newspaper, Andrew Bradford's American Weekly Mercury, began publishing on December 22, 1719.

The city also developed culturally and scientifically. Schools, libraries and theaters were founded. James Logan arrived in Philadelphia in 1701 as a secretary for William Penn. He was the first to help establish Philadelphia as a place of culture and learning. Logan, who was the mayor of Philadelphia in the early 1720s, created one of the largest libraries in the colonies. He also helped guide other prominent Philadelphia residents, which included botanist John Bartram and Benjamin Franklin. Benjamin Franklin arrived in Philadelphia in October 1723 and would play a large part in the city's development. To help protect the city from fire, Franklin founded the Union Fire Company. In the 1750s Franklin was named one of the city's post master generals and he established postal routes between Philadelphia, New York, Boston, and elsewhere. He helped raise money to build the American colonies' first hospital, which opened in 1752. That same year the College of Philadelphia, another project of Franklin's, received its charter of incorporation. Threatened by French and Spanish privateers, Franklin and others set up a volunteer group for defense and built two batteries.

When the French and Indian War began in 1754 as part of the Seven Years' War, Franklin recruited militias. During the war, the city attracted many refugees from the western frontier. When Pontiac's Rebellion occurred in 1763, refugees again fled into the city, including a group of Lenape hiding from other Native Americans, angry at their pacifism, and white frontiersmen. The Paxton Boys tried to follow them into Philadelphia for attacks, but was prevented by the city's militia and Franklin, who convinced them to leave.

=== American Revolution ===
In the 1760s, the British Parliament's passage of the Stamp Act and the Townshend Acts, combined with other frustrations, increased political tension and anger against Britain in the colonies. Philadelphia residents joined boycotts of British goods. After the Tea Act in 1773, there were threats against anyone who would store tea and any ships that brought tea up the Delaware. After the Boston Tea Party, a shipment of tea had arrived in December, on the ship the Polly. A committee told the captain to depart without unloading his cargo.

A series of acts in 1774 further angered the colonies; activists called for a general congress and they agreed to meet in Philadelphia. The First Continental Congress was held in September in Carpenters' Hall. During the American Revolutionary War, Philadelphia was the site of the First and Second Continental Congresses.

=== American Revolutionary War ===
After the American Revolutionary War began in April 1775 following the Battles of Lexington and Concord, the Second Continental Congress met in May at the Pennsylvania State House. There, they also met a year later to write and sign the Declaration of Independence in July 1776. Philadelphia was important to the war effort; Robert Morris said,

You will consider Philadelphia, from its centrical situation, the extent of its commerce, the number of its artificers, manufactures and other circumstances, to be to the United States what the heart is to the human body in circulating the blood.

After Washington's defeat at the Battle of Brandywine on September 11, 1777, the revolutionary capital of Philadelphia was defenseless, and the city prepared for what was seen as an inevitable British Army attack. Because bells could easily be recast into munitions, one of those preparations was hastily removing the Liberty Bell and other Philadelphia bells and sending them by heavily guarded wagon train to the Zion German Reformed Church in Northampton Town in present-day Allentown, where it was hidden under the church floor boards during the British occupation of Philadelphia. The Liberty Bell remained hidden in Allentown from September 1777 until its return to Philadelphia in June 1778, following the British retreat from Philadelphia on June 18, 1778.

After the Revolution's conclusion in 1783, Philadelphia was chosen to be the temporary capital of the United States from 1790 to 1800, and the city continued for some years to be the country's cultural and financial center. Its large free black community aided fugitive slaves and founded the first independent black denomination in the nation, the African Methodist Episcopal Church.

The port city was vulnerable to capture by the British by sea. Officials recruited soldiers and studied defenses for invasion from Delaware Bay, but built no forts or other installations. In March 1776 two British frigates began a blockade of the mouth of Delaware Bay; British soldiers were moving south through New Jersey from New York. In December fear of invasion caused half the population to flee the city, including the Continental Congress, which moved to Baltimore. General George Washington pushed back the British advance at the battles of Princeton and Trenton, and the refugees and Congress returned. In September 1777, the British invaded Philadelphia from the south. Washington intercepted them at the Battle of Brandywine but was driven back.

==== Philadelphia campaign ====
Following Washington's defeat at the Battle of Brandywine on September 11, 1777, thousands of Philadelphians fled north within Pennsylvania and east into New Jersey. Congress moved to Lancaster and then to York. Fearing the British Army would seize the Liberty Bell and other large Philadelphia bells, which could easily be recast into munitions, the Liberty Bell was hastily transported north, where it was hidden beneath the floor boards of the Zion German Reformed Church in Northampton Town, in present-day Allentown, Pennsylvania.

On September 23, 1777, as expected, British troops marched into a half-empty Philadelphia and were met by cheering Loyalist crowds. The British occupation of the colonial capital would last ten months. After the French entered the War on the side of the Continentals, the last British troops pulled out of Philadelphia on June 18, 1778, to help defend New York City and the Continentals arrived the same day and reclaimed Philadelphia, placing Major General Benedict Arnold in charge as the city's military commander. The city government returned a week later, and the Continental Congress returned in early July. The Liberty Bell, which had been hidden in an Allentown church since September 1777, was returned to Philadelphia following the British retreat from Philadelphia on June 18, 1778.

At the end of the American Revolutionary War, many Patriot soldiers had not been paid their wages for their service during the war. Congress refused the soldiers' request for payment of their salaries. In what is known as the Pennsylvania Mutiny of 1783, hundreds of Patriot veterans of the war who were owed back pay marched with their weapons on the Pennsylvania statehouse in Philadelphia. Congress, lacking in funds, fled from Philadelphia to Princeton, New Jersey. With their departure and the departure of their families and staffs, Philadelphia was left all but deserted.

As a result of the Pennsylvania Mutiny of 1783, Congress fled Philadelphia, eventually settling in New York City, designated as the temporary capital. Besides the Constitutional Convention in May 1787, United States politics was no longer centered in Philadelphia. Due to political compromise, Congress chose a permanent capital to be built along the Potomac River.

After 1787, the city's economy grew rapidly in the postwar years. Serious yellow fever outbreaks in the 1790s interrupted development. Benjamin Rush identified an outbreak in August 1793 as a yellow fever epidemic, the first in 30 years, which lasted four months. Two thousand refugees from Saint-Domingue had recently arrived in the city in flight from the Haitian Revolution. They represented five percent of the city's total population. They likely carried the disease from the island where it was endemic, and it was rapidly transmitted by mosquito bites to other residents. Fear of contracting the disease caused 20,000 residents to flee the city by mid-September, and some neighboring towns prohibited their entry. Trade virtually stopped; Baltimore and New York quarantined people and goods from Philadelphia. People feared entering the city or interacting with its residents. The fever finally abated at the end of October with the onset of colder weather and was declared at an end by mid-November. The death toll was 4,000 to 5,000, in a population of 50,000. Yellow fever outbreaks recurred in Philadelphia and other major ports through the nineteenth century, but none had as many fatalities as that of 1793. The 1798 epidemic in Philadelphia also prompted an exodus; an estimated 1,292 residents died.

Pennsylvania, which had abolished slavery in 1780, required any slaves brought to the city to be freed after six months' residency. The state law was challenged by French planters from Saint-Domingue, who brought their enslaved peoples with them, but defended by the Pennsylvania Abolition Society. Through 1796, 500 slaves from Saint-Domingue gained freedom in the city. Because of the violence accompanying the revolution on the island, Philadelphians, many of whom had southern ties, and residents of the Upper South worried that free people of color would encourage slave insurrections in the U.S.

Historian Gary B. Nash emphasizes the role of the working class, and their distrust of their betters, in northern ports. He argues that working class artisans and skilled craftsmen made up a radical element in Philadelphia that took control of the city starting about 1770 and promoted a radical Democratic form of government during the revolution. They held power for a while, and used their control of the local militia to disseminate their ideology to the working class and to stay in power until the businessmen staged a conservative counterrevolution. Philadelphia suffered serious inflation, causing problems especially for the poor, who were unable to buy needed goods. This led to unrest in 1779, with people blaming the upper class and Loyalists. A riot in January by sailors striking for higher wages ended up with their attacking and dismantling ships. In the Fort Wilson Riot of October 4, men attacked James Wilson, a signer of the Declaration of Independence who was accused of being a Loyalist sympathizer. Soldiers broke up the riot, but five people died and 17 were injured.

However, Philadelphia was selected as the temporary United States capital for ten years starting in 1790. The United States Congress, founded in March 1789, occupied the Philadelphia County Courthouse, which became known as Congress Hall, and the Supreme Court worked at City Hall. Robert Morris donated his home at 6th and Market Street as a residence for President Washington, known as the President's House.

During the city's 10 years as federal capital, members of Congress were exempt from the abolition law, but the many slaveholders in the executive and judicial branches were not. President Washington, Vice-president Jefferson and others brought slaves as domestic servants, and evaded the law by regularly shifting their slaves out of the city before the 6-month deadline. Two of Washington's slaves escaped from the President's House, and he gradually replaced his slaves with German immigrants who were indentured servants.

The Pennsylvania state government left Philadelphia in 1799 and the United States government left in 1800. By this time, the city had become one of the United States' busiest ports and the country's largest city, with 67,787 people living in Philadelphia and its contiguous suburbs. Philadelphia's maritime trade was interrupted by the Embargo Act of 1807 and then the War of 1812. After the war, Philadelphia's shipping industry never returned to its pre-embargo status, and New York City succeeded it as the busiest port and largest city.

=== 19th century ===
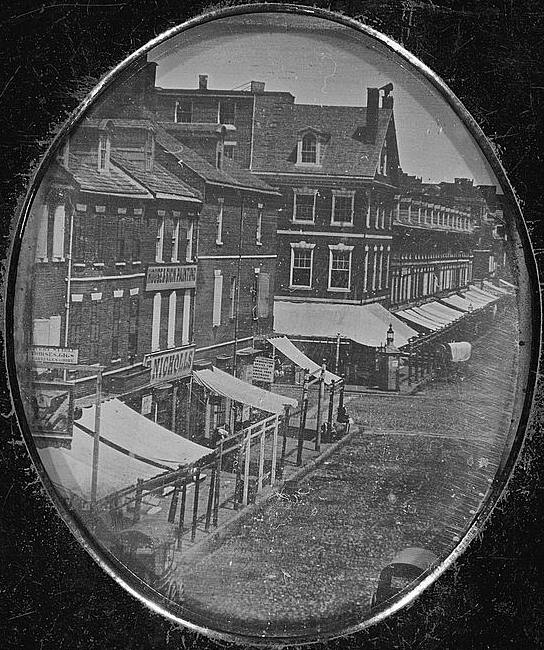
8th and Market Streets in 1840

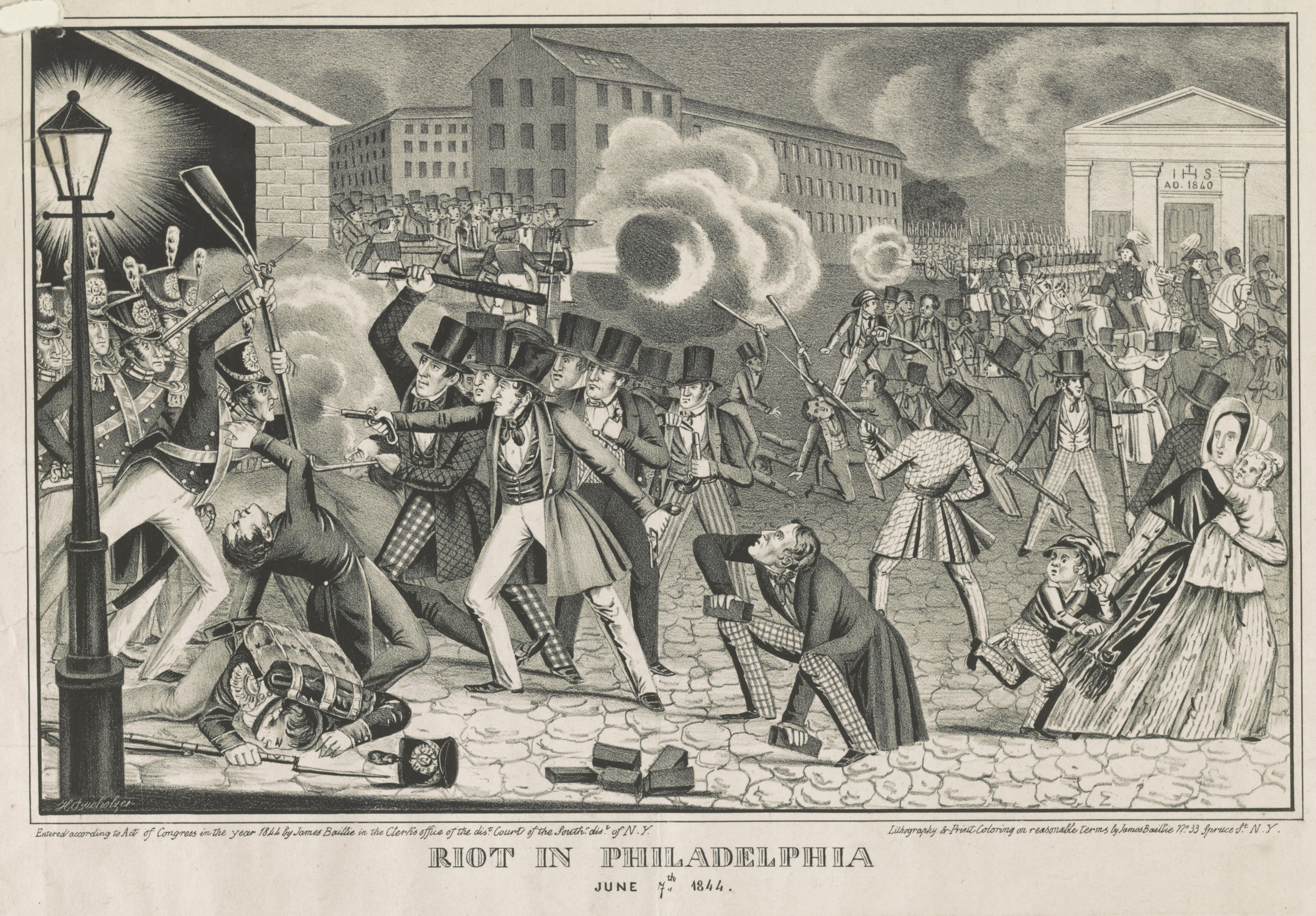
A nativist riot in the Southwark section of Philadelphia in July 1844

From right to left: Congress Hall, Independence Hall, and Old City Hall in 1855

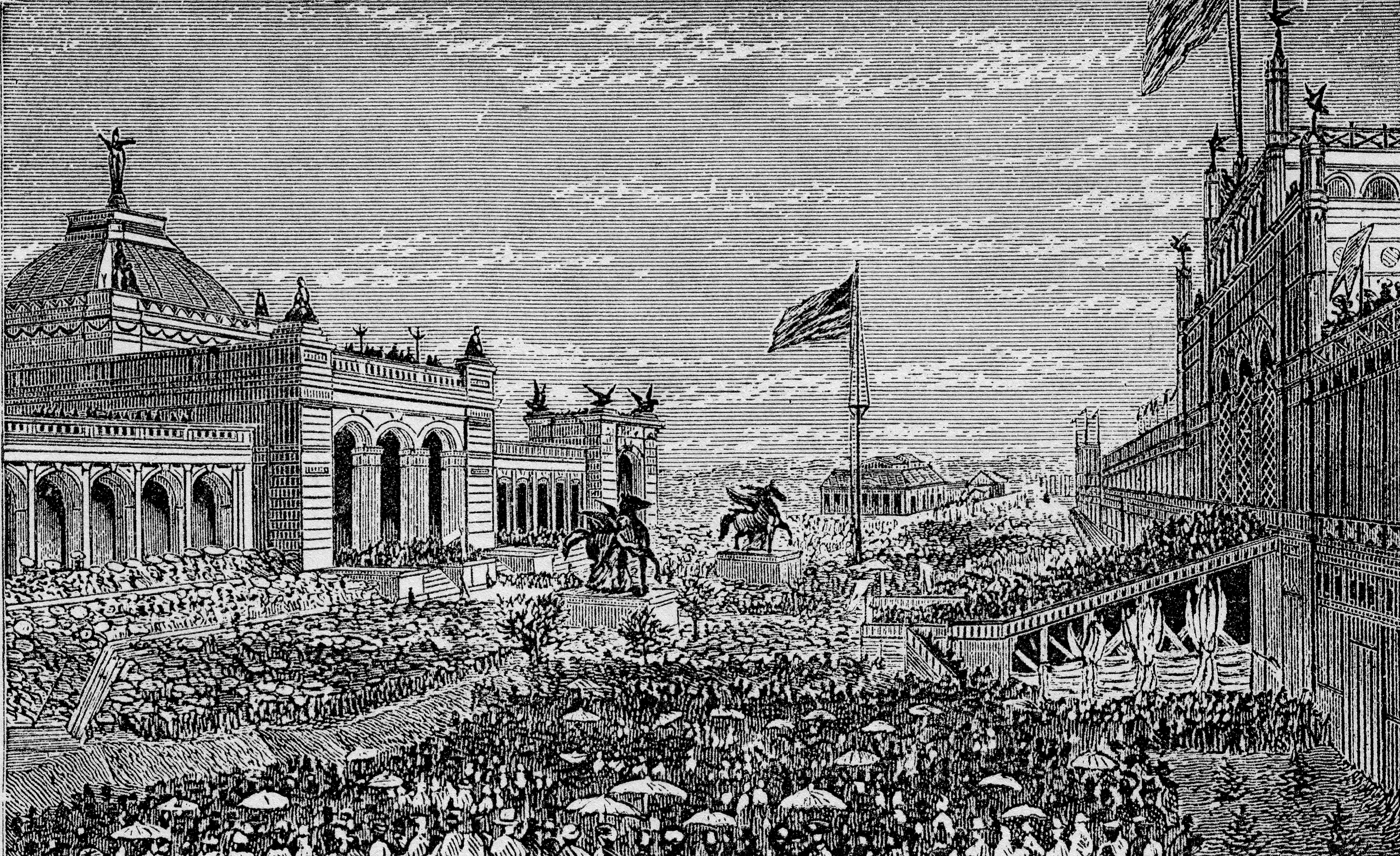
Opening day ceremonies at the Centennial Exhibition in Philadelphia 1876

The embargo and decrease in foreign trade led to the development of local factories to produce goods no longer available as imports. Manufacturing plants and foundries were built and Philadelphia became an important center of paper-related industries and the leather, shoe, and boot industries. Coal and iron mines, and the construction of new roads, canals, and railroads helped Philadelphia's manufacturing power grow, and the city became the United States' first major industrial city. Major industrial projects included the Waterworks, iron water pipes, a gasworks, and the U.S. Naval Yard. In response to exploitative working conditions, some 20,000 Philadelphia workers staged the first general strike in North America in 1835, in which workers in the city won the ten-hour workday and an increase in wages. In addition to its industrial power, Philadelphia was the financial center of the country. Along with chartered and private banks, the city was the home of the First and Second Banks of the United States, Mechanics National Bank and the first U.S. Mint. Cultural institutions, such as the Pennsylvania Academy of the Fine Arts, the Academy of Natural Sciences, the Athenaeum and the Franklin Institute also developed in the 19th century. The Pennsylvania General Assembly passed the Free School Law of 1834 to create the public school system.

In the mid and late 1850s, immigrants from Ireland and Germany streamed into the city, swelling the population of Philadelphia and its suburbs. In Philadelphia, as the rich moved west of 7th Street, the poor moved into the upper class' former homes, which were converted into tenements and boarding houses. Many small row houses crowded alleyways and small streets, and these areas were filthy, filled with garbage and the smell of manure from animal pens. During the 1840s and 1850s, hundreds died each year in Philadelphia and the surrounding districts from diseases such as malaria, smallpox, tuberculosis, and cholera, related to poor sanitation; the poor suffered the most fatalities. Small rowhouses and tenement housing were constructed south of South Street.

==== Lawlessness and violence ====
Violence was a serious problem; gangs like the Moyamensing Killers and the Blood Tubs controlled various neighborhoods. During the 1840s and early 1850s when volunteer fire companies, some of which were infiltrated by gangs, responded to a fire, fights with other fire companies often broke out. The lawlessness among fire companies virtually ended in 1853 and 1854 when the city took more control over their operations. During the 1840s and 50s violence was directed against immigrants by people who feared their competition for jobs and resented newcomers of different religions and ethnicity. Nativists often held mostly anti-Catholic, anti-Irish meetings. Violence against immigrants also occurred, the worst being the nativist riots in 1844. Violence against African Americans was also common during the 1830s, 40s, and 50s. Immigrants competed with them for jobs, and deadly race riots resulted in the burning of African-American homes and churches. In 1841, Joseph Sturge commented "...there is probably no city in the known world where dislike, amounting to the hatred of the coloured population, prevails more than in the city of brotherly love!" Several anti-slavery societies had been formed and free blacks, Quakers and other abolitionists operated safe houses associated with the Underground Railroad, but working class and ethnic whites opposed the abolitionist movement.

The lawlessness and the difficulty in controlling it, along with residential development just north of Philadelphia, led to the Act of Consolidation in 1854. The act passed on February 2, making Philadelphia's borders coterminous with Philadelphia County, and incorporating various subdistrict within the county.

==== American Civil War ====
Once the American Civil War began in 1861, Philadelphia's pro-southern leanings were reduced. Popular hostility shifted against southern sympathizers. Mobs threatened a secessionist newspaper and the homes of suspected sympathizers, and were only turned away by the police and Mayor Alexander Henry. Philadelphia supported the war with soldiers, ammunition, and war ships and its manufacturers produced many army uniforms. Philadelphia was also a major receiving place of the wounded, with more than 157,000 soldiers and sailors treated within the city. Philadelphia began preparing for invasion in 1863, but the Confederate Army was repelled by Union forces at Gettysburg.

In the years following the American Civil War, Philadelphia's population continued to grow. The population grew from 565,529 in 1860 to 674,022 in 1870. By 1876, the city's population stood at 817,000. The dense population areas were not only growing north and south along the Delaware River, but also moving westward across the Schuylkill River. A large portion of the growth came from immigrants, still mostly Irish and German. In 1870, twenty-seven percent of Philadelphia's population was born outside the United States.

By the 1880s, immigration from Russia, Eastern Europe, and Italy started rivaling immigration from Western Europe. Many of the immigrants from Russia and Eastern Europe were Jewish. In 1881, there were around 5,000 Jews in the city, and by 1905 the number had increased to 100,000. Philadelphia's Italian population grew from around 300 in 1870 to around 18,000 in 1900, with the majority settling in South Philadelphia. Along with foreign immigration, domestic migration by African Americans from the South led to Philadelphia having the largest black population of a Northern U.S. city in this period. By 1876, nearly 25,000 African Americans living in Philadelphia, and by 1890 the population was near 40,000. While immigrants moved into the city, Philadelphia's rich left for newer housing in the suburbs, with commuting made easy by newly constructed railroads. During the 1880s much of Philadelphia's upper class moved into the growing suburbs along the Philadelphia Main Line west of the city.

Politically the city was dominated by the Republican Party, which had developed a strong political machine. The Republicans dominated the post-war elections, and corrupt officials made their way into the government and continued to control the city through voter fraud and intimidation. The Gas Trust was the hub of the city's political machine. The trust controlled the gas company supplying lighting to the city. With the board under complete control by Republicans in 1865, they awarded contracts and perks for themselves and their cronies. Some government reform did occur during this time. The police department was reorganized; and volunteer fire companies were eliminated and were replaced by a paid fire department. A compulsory school act passed in 1895, and the Public School Reorganization Act freed the city's education from the political machine. Higher education changed as well. The University of Pennsylvania moved to West Philadelphia and reorganized to its modern form; and Temple University, Drexel University and the Free Library were founded.

The city's major project was organizing and staging the Centennial Exposition, the first World's Fair in the United States, which celebrated the nation's Centennial. Held in Fairmount Park, exhibits included Alexander Graham Bell's telephone and the Corliss Steam Engine. Beginning May 10, 1876, by the end of the Exposition on November 10, more than nine million people had visited the fair. The city undertook construction of a new city hall, designed to match its ambitions. The project was graft-ridden and it took twenty-three years to complete. Upon completion of its tower in 1894, City Hall was the tallest building in Philadelphia, a position it maintained until One Liberty Place surpassed it in 1986.

==== Industry ====
Philadelphia was an industrial powerhouse for most of the 19th and early 20th centuries. Its major industries of the era included, but were in no means limited to, the Baldwin Locomotive Works, William Cramp & Sons Ship and Engine Building Company, and the Pennsylvania Railroad. Westward expansion of the Pennsylvania Railroad helped Philadelphia keep up with nearby New York City in domestic commerce, as both cities fought for dominance in transporting iron and coal resources from Pennsylvania. Philadelphia's other local railroad was the Reading Railroad, but after a series of bankruptcies, it was taken over by New Yorkers. The Panic of 1873, which occurred when the New York City branch of the Philadelphia bank Jay Cooke and Company failed, and another panic in the 1890s hampered Philadelphia's economic growth. While the depressions hurt the city, its diverse array of industries helped it weather difficult times. It had numerous iron and steel-related manufacturers, including Philadelphian-owned iron and steel works outside the city, most notably the Bethlehem Iron Company in the city by that name. The largest industry in Philadelphia was textiles. Philadelphia produced more textiles than any other U.S. city; in 1904 the textile industry employed more than 35 percent of the city's workers. The cigar, sugar, and oil industries also were strong in the city. During this time the major department stores: Wanamaker's, Gimbels, Strawbridge and Clothier, and Lit Brothers, were developed along Market Street.

By the end of the century, the city provided nine municipal swimming pools, making it a leader in the nation.

Philadelphia became one of the first U.S. industrial centers with a variety of industries, the largest being textiles. It had many economic and family ties to the South, with southern planters maintaining second homes in the city and having business connections with banks, sending their daughters to French finishing schools run by refugees from Saint-Domingue in Haiti, selling their cotton to textile manufacturers, which in turn sold some products to the South, for instance, clothing for slaves. At the beginning of the American Civil War, there were many southern sympathizers, although most city residents became firmly Union as the war went on.

==== Trades ====
The city also had many smaller, localized businesses, trades, craftsmen and women, specialty industries, and importers, such as Philip Borbeck (1814-1897), a 23-year-old German emigrant from Gensungen, near Felsberg, Hesse, who arrived in New York from Bremen on August 20, 1837, on the Ship St. Lawrence, and went to Philadelphia to become by turns a paper dealer, bookseller, stationer, shoe importer, and cutlery & hardware dealer. He married Ann M. Landis, of the Frankford Swiss Mennonite family, at Saint Michael's Zion Church in 1844. Two years later, he was a first-class passenger on the steamship SS Great Britain in 1846, traveling from Liverpool to New York.

He died in 1897, his wife died days later. She gave birth to at least 12 children. His estate was contested by family members who argued that a son-in-law had "undue influence" and cut one of his daughters out of the Will. The Borbeck estate was worth $40,000 at the time, which in today's relative wealth (2025) would be worth $15,095,579.95.

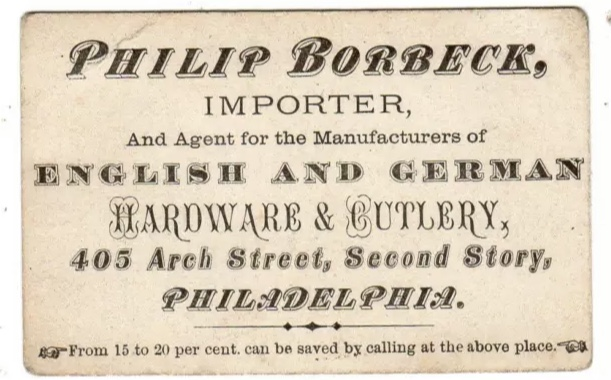
Philip Borbeck, Hardware & Cutlery, Philadelphia. About 1865.

Philadelphia became the leading leather manufacturing center in the country after Peabody, Massachusetts, in the late 19th century and early 20th. William Penn operated a tannery in Philadelphia as early as 1683. The city became a leading manufacturer and exporter of fine leather goods, and was considered the country's top producer until Milwaukee surpassed it in the early 1900s. In 1855, with nearly a half million people in Philadelphia, there were 31 morocco leather manufacturing companies with 129 "dressers" or "finishers" in the directory. There were 76 tanners and 96 curriers, and 97 under the term "leather"—from manufacturer to merchant to dealer.

Notable tanneries in Philadelphia's history include:

- McNeely and Company Leather Manufactory: Operated from 1830 to the early 20th century
- Burk Brothers and Company: A group of 12 interconnected buildings that date from 1855 to 1913. These buildings are some of the oldest and largest leather industry buildings in Philadelphia's old leather district.
- Mark Costello, Robert Cooey and Charles O'Neill, immigrants from Northern Ireland, formed a small moroccan leather manufactory in 1877 called Costello, Cooey & Company (until 1913). Eventually employing a hundred men, the two-story, acre-wide factory on the Frankford Creekin Bridesburg produced three hundred dozen skins daily—leather sold to makers of shoes, boots, gloves, wallets, bookbinding, purses, satchels and suitcases. Across four decades, despite patent litigation, labor strikes and the deaths of two of its founding principals, the partnership thrived in the highly competitive glazed kid and fine leather marketplace.
- The Kistler family: Had tanneries in Philadelphia, Lock Haven, and Sciota, as well as mills in other parts of the country and world.

In nearby Wilmington, another large leather-producing city in the U.S., a report described a Morocco tannery in 1872:

He saw "a bright room where half a dozen pretty sewing machine girls are stitching the wet, slimy skins into bags" while "strong muscular Negroes" fill the bags with sumac dust and water in "gloomy cellars" and upstairs "young Swedes and Irish boys dress the dry skins, a backbreaking operation, apparently," commented the writer, "in the attitude of laundresses bent over an eternal washboard.

After the American Civil War, city government was controlled by the Republican Party; it established a political machine that gained power through patronage. By the beginning of the 20th century, Philadelphia was described as "corrupt and contented." Various reform efforts slowly changed city government; in 1950, a new city charter strengthened the position of mayor and weakened the Philadelphia City Council. Beginning during the Great Depression, voters changed from traditional support for the Republican Party to increasing support for the Democratic Party of President Franklin D. Roosevelt, which has now been predominant in local politics for many decades.

The population grew dramatically at the end of the 19th and beginning of the 20th centuries, through immigration from Ireland, Southern Europe, Eastern Europe, and Asia, and the Great Migration of blacks from the rural South and Puerto Ricans from the Caribbean, all attracted to the city's expanding industrial jobs. The Pennsylvania Railroad was expanding and hired 10,000 workers from the South. Manufacturing plants and the U.S. Navy Yard employed tens of thousands of industrial workers along the rivers, and the city was also a center of finance and publishing, with major universities.

=== 20th century ===
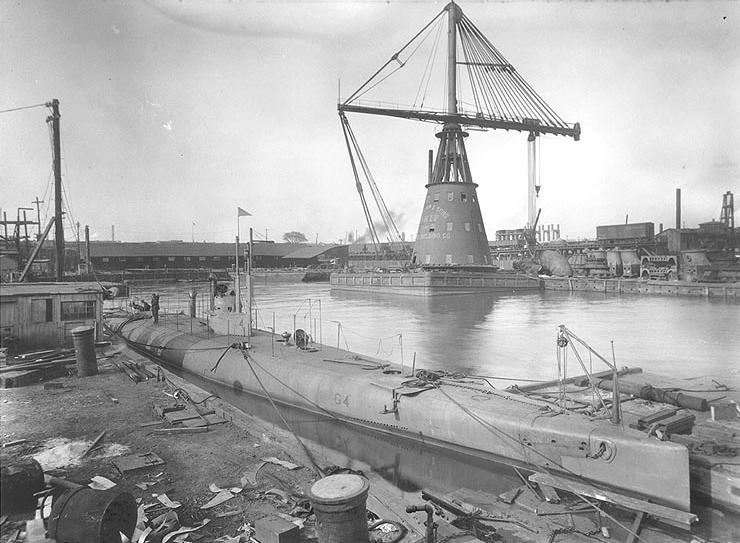
USS G-4 at the William Cramp & Sons shipyard in Philadelphia in October 1912

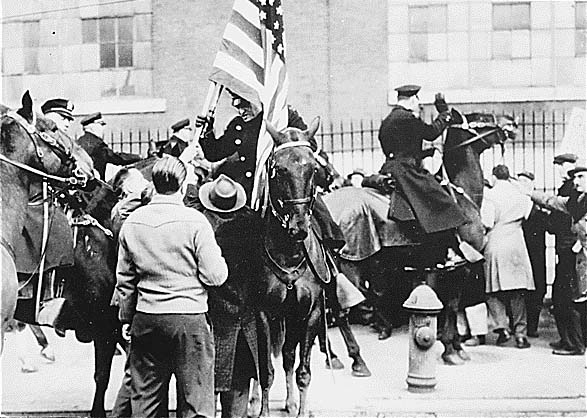
Mounted police clashing with strikers, one carrying an American flag, outside the Westinghouse electrical plant in Philadelphia in 1946

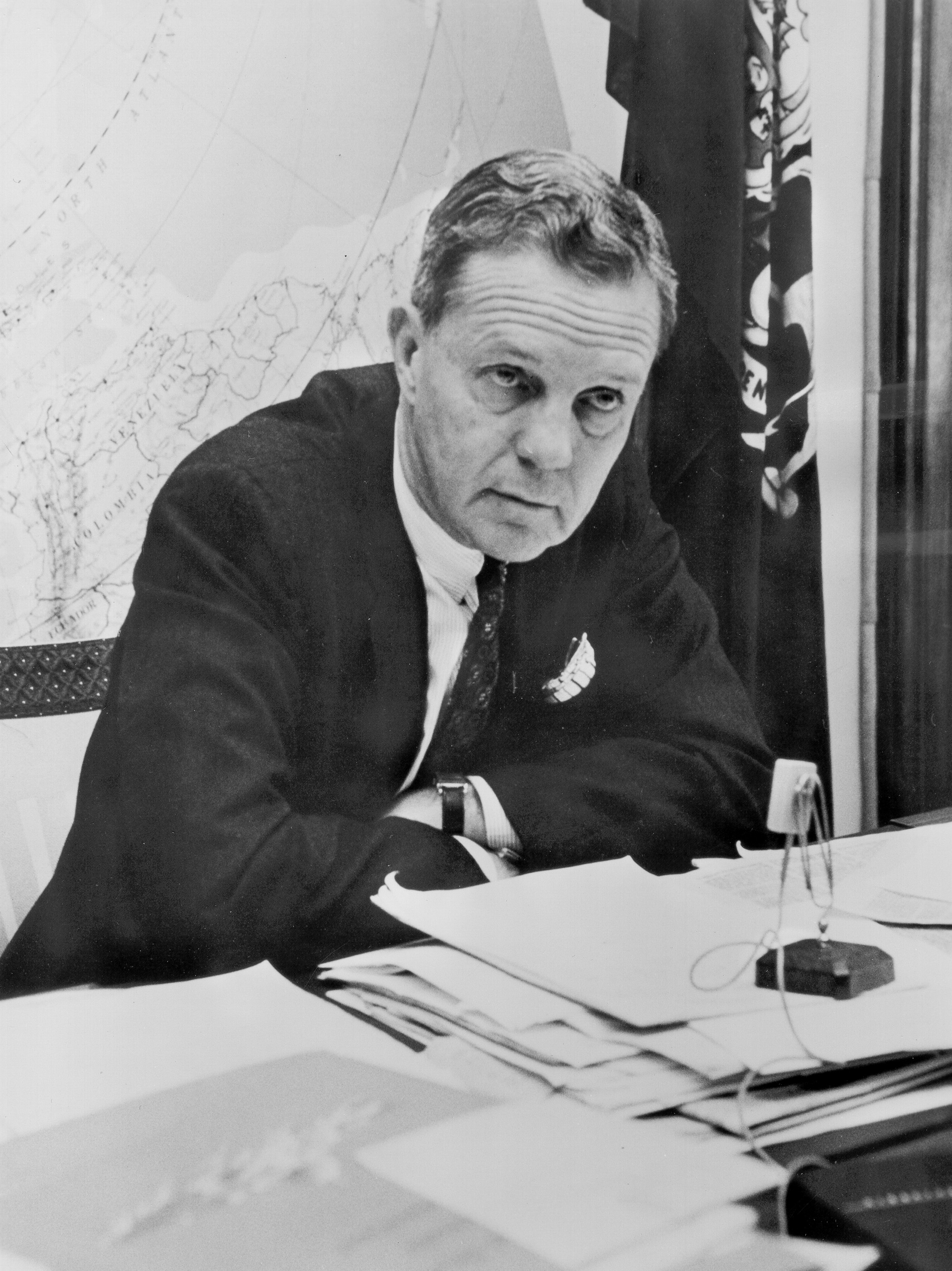
Joseph S. Clark Jr., Philadelphia's mayor from 1952 until 1956

In the beginning of the 20th century, Philadelphia had taken on a poor reputation. People both inside and outside of the city commented that Philadelphia and its citizens were dull and contented with its lack of change. Harper's Magazine commented that "The one thing unforgivable in Philadelphia is to be new, to be different from what has been." In his pioneering 1899 work of urban sociology The Philadelphia Negro W. E. B. Du Bois had written, "Few large cities have such a disreputable record for misgovernment as Philadelphia." Du Bois's study found, in addition to general mismanagement and neglect, severe racial disparities in employment, housing, health, education, and criminal justice. These disparities persisted; for example, between 1910 and 1920 the proportion of black citizens of Philadelphia who developed tuberculosis was four to six times that of whites.

Along with an image of "dullness" and of poor governance practices, Philadelphia was known for its political corruption. The Republican-controlled political machine, run by Israel Durham, permeated all parts of city government. One official estimated that US$5 million was wasted each year from graft in the city's infrastructure programs. The majority of residents were Republican, but voter fraud and bribery were still common. In 1905, the city enacted election reforms, such as personal voter registration and the establishing primaries for all city offices. But, residents became complacent, and the city's political bosses continued in control. After 1907, Boss Durham retired and his successor, James McNichol, never controlled much outside North Philadelphia. The Vare brothers, George, Edwin, and William, had created their own organization in South Philadelphia. With no central authority, Senator Boies Penrose took charge. In 1910, infighting between McNichol and the Vares contributed to the reform candidate, Rudolph Blankenburg, to be elected mayor. During his administration, he made numerous cost-cutting measures and improvements to city services, but he served only one term. The machine again gained control.

In 1910, a general strike occurred across the city, starting originally among streetcar workers it then spread to 65,000 - 70,000 workers shutting down the entire city.

The policies of Woodrow Wilson's administration reunited reformers with the city's Republican Party and World War I temporarily halted the reform movement. In 1917, the murder of George Eppley, a police officer defending City Council primary candidate James Carey, ignited the reformers again. They passed legislation to reduce the City Council from two houses to one, and provided council members an annual salary. With the deaths of McNichol in 1917 and Penrose in 1921, William Vare became the city's political boss. In the 1920s the public flouting of Prohibition laws, mob violence, and police involvement in illegal activities led Mayor W. Freeland Kendrick to appoint Brigadier General Smedley Butler of the U.S. Marine Corps as director of public safety. Butler cracked down on bars and speakeasies and tried to stop corruption within the police force, but demand for liquor and political pressure made the job difficult, and he had little success. After two years, Butler left in January 1926 and most of his police reforms were repealed. On August 1, 1928, Boss Vare suffered a stroke, and two weeks later a grand jury investigation into the city's mob violence and other crimes began. Numerous police officers were dismissed or arrested as a result of the investigation, but no permanent change resulted. Strong support among some residents for the Democratic presidential candidate Al Smith, who was Catholic, marked the city's turning away in the 20th century from the Republican Party.

Philadelphia continued to grow with immigrants coming from Eastern Europe, Italy, and African American migrants from the South. Foreign immigration was briefly interrupted by World War I. The demand for labor for the city's factories, including the new U.S. Naval Yard at Hog Island, which constructed ships, trains, and other items needed in the war effort, helped attract blacks in the Great Migration. In September 1918, cases of the influenza pandemic were reported at the Naval Yard and began to spread. The disease became widespread following the Philadelphia Liberty Loans Parade, which was attended by more than 200,000 people. Mortality on some days was several hundred people and, by the time the pandemic began to subside in October, more than 12,000 people had died.

The rising popularity of automobiles led to widening of roads and creation of Northeast (Roosevelt) Boulevard in 1914, the Benjamin Franklin Parkway in 1918, the changing of many existing streets to one-way streets in the early 1920s, and construction of the Delaware River (Benjamin Franklin) Bridge to New Jersey in 1926. Philadelphia began to modernize, steel and concrete skyscrapers were constructed, old buildings were wired for electricity, and the city's first commercial radio station was founded. In 1907, the city constructed the first subway. It hosted the Sesqui-Centennial Exposition in South Philadelphia, and in 1928 opened the Philadelphia Museum of Art.

==== Great Depression ====
In the three years after the stock market crashed in 1929, 50 Philadelphia banks closed. Of those only two were large, Albert M. Greenfield's Bankers Trust Company and the Franklin Trust Company. Savings and loan associations also faced trouble, with mortgages of 19,000 properties being foreclosed in 1932 alone. By 1934, 1,600 of 3,400 savings and loan associations had shut down. From 1929 to 1933, regional manufacturing fell by 45 percent; factory payrolls fell by 60 percent; retail sales fell by 40 percent. Worst hit of all was construction, where payrolls dropped 84 percent. Unemployment peaked in 1933, when 11.5 percent of whites, 16.2 percent of African Americans, and 19.1 percent of foreign-born whites were out of work. Mayor J. Hampton Moore blamed people's economic woes, not on the worldwide Great Depression, but on laziness and wastefulness, and claimed there was no starvation in the city. Soon after, he fired 3,500 city workers, instituted pay cuts, forced unpaid vacation, and reduced the number of contracts the city awarded. This saved Philadelphia millions of dollars, and the efforts kept the city from defaulting on its debts, but were unpopular among the unemployed. The city relied on state money to fund relief efforts. Moore's successor S. Davis Wilson instituted numerous programs financed by Franklin D. Roosevelt's New Deal's Works Progress Administration, despite condemning the program during his mayoral campaign. At the peak of WPA-financed jobs in 1936, 40,000 Philadelphians were employed under the program.

With encouragement from the state government and labor's founding of the Congress of Industrial Organizations (CIO), Philadelphia became a union city. Many trade unions discriminated against African Americans for years, and they were closed out of some labor advances. Workers' dissatisfaction with conditions led to numerous strikes in the textile unions, and the CIO organized labor in other industries, with more strikes taking place. During the 1930s, the Democratic Party began to grow in Philadelphia, influenced by the leadership of the Roosevelt administration during the Depression. A newly organized Independent Democratic Committee reached out to residents. In 1936, the Democratic National Convention was held in Philadelphia. The majority of voters in the city reelected the Democrat Franklin D. Roosevelt as president; they also voted for Democratic Congressmen and state representatives. City government continued to be dominated by Republicans, but the politicians were elected by small margins.

==== Second World War ====
The beginning of World War II in Europe and the threat of the U.S. becoming involved generated new jobs in defense-related industries. After the U.S. became involved in the war in 1941, the city mobilized. Philadelphia consistently met war bond quotas and when the war ended in 1945, 183,850 residents were in the U.S. armed forces. With so many men serving in the military, there had been a labor shortage; businesses and industries hired women and workers from outside the city. In 1944, the Philadelphia Transportation Company promoted African Americans to positions as motormen and conductors (from which they had previously been excluded) on public transportation vehicles. Resentful, other PTC workers protested and began a strike that nearly immobilized the city. President Roosevelt sent troops to replace the striking workers. After a federal ultimatum, the workers returned after six days.

==== Postwar reform and deindustrialization ====
In 1947, Richardson Dilworth was selected as the Democratic candidate, but lost to incumbent mayor Bernard Samuel. During the campaign Dilworth made numerous specific charges about corruption within city government. The City Council set up a committee to investigate, with findings followed by a grand jury investigation. The five-year investigation and its findings garnered national attention. US$40 million in city spending was found to be unaccounted for, and the president judge of the Court of Common pleas had been tampering with court cases. The fire marshal went to prison; and an official in the tax collection office, a water department employee, a plumbing inspector, and head of the police vice squad each committed suicide after criminal exposures. The public and the press demanded reform and by the end of 1950, a new city charter was drafted. The new charter strengthened the position of the mayor and weakened the City Council. The council would be made of ten councilmen elected by district and seven at large. City administration was streamlined and new boards and commissions were created.

In 1951, Joseph S. Clark was elected as the first Democratic mayor in 80 years. Clark filled administration positions based on merit and worked to weed out corruption. Despite reforms and the Clark administration, a powerful Democratic patronage organization eventually replaced the old Republican one. Clark was succeeded by Richardson Dilworth, who continued the policies of his predecessor. Dilworth resigned to run for governor in 1962, and city council president James Tate was elected as the city's first Irish Catholic mayor. Tate was elected mayor in 1963 and reelected in 1967 despite opposition from reformers who opposed him as an organization insider.

After World War II ended, Philadelphia had a serious housing shortage. Around half of the city's housing had been built in the 19th century, and many units lacked proper sanitary facilities, were overcrowded, and in poor condition. Competition for housing, as African Americans (many had come to the city in the Great Migration from the South) and Puerto Ricans moved into new neighborhoods, resulted in racial tension. The wealthier middle-class residents, often white, continued to move out to the suburbs in what became called white flight.

The population peaked at more than two million residents in 1950; afterward the city's population declined while that of the neighboring suburban counties grew. Some residents moved out of the region altogether due to restructuring of industry and loss of tens of thousands of jobs in the city. Philadelphia lost five percent of its population in the 1950s, three percent in the 1960s and more than thirteen percent in the 1970s. Manufacturing and other major Philadelphia businesses, which had supported middle-class lives for the working class, were moving out of the area or shutting down in industrial restructuring, including major declines in railroads.

Politically, Philadelphia's postwar liberalism was to the left of other major cities at the time such as Los Angeles, Oakland and Detroit where business-backed coalitions of white homeowners resisted racial integration to a greater degree. In Philadelphia, postwar liberals were able to intervene more directly in the economy through employment and industrial retention programs such as Leon Sullivan's Opportunities Industrialization Center and the Philadelphia Industrial Development Corporation. Ultimately, these initiatives were not able to overcome white backlash to racial integration, particularly in housing, but they did contribute to a stabilization of Philadelphia's economic and industrial base.

The city encouraged development projects in University City in West Philadelphia and the area around Temple University in North Philadelphia, it removed the "Chinese Wall" elevated railway, and developed Market Street East around the transportation hub. Some gentrification occurred, with restoration of properties in historic neighborhoods such as Society Hill, Rittenhouse Square, Queen Village, and the Fairmount area. A non profit group Action Philadelphia was formed to improve and promote Philadelphia's image. The airport expanded, the Schuylkill Expressway and the Delaware Expressway (Interstate 95) were built, SEPTA was formed, and residential and industrial development took place in Northeast Philadelphia.

By the 1950s, much Philadelphia housing was aged and substandard. In the post-World War II era of suburbanization and construction of area highways, many middle-class families met their demand for newer housing by leaving the city for the suburbs. Population decline accompanied the industrial restructuring and the loss of tens of thousands of jobs in the mid 20th century. With increasing poverty and social dislocation in the city, gang and mafia warfare plagued the city in from the mid-20th century to the early 21st century.

As elsewhere in major US cities, the 1960s was a turbulent decade for the city. Numerous civil rights and anti-war protests took place, including large protests led by Marie Hicks to desegregate Girard College. Students took over the Community College of Philadelphia in a sit-in, race riots broke out in Holmesburg Prison, and a 1964 riot along West Columbia Avenue killed two people, injured over 300 and caused around US$3 million in damages. Crime was also a serious problem. Primarily drug-related gang warfare plagued the city, and in 1970 crime was rated the city's number one problem in a City Planning Commission survey. The court system was overtaxed and the tactics of the police department under Police Commissioner Frank Rizzo were controversial. Rizzo was credited with preventing the level of violence seen in other cities at the time and was elected mayor in 1971.

The outspoken Rizzo, who was reelected in 1975, was a divisive figure who had loyal supporters and passionate opponents. Police and fire departments and cultural institutions were well supported under Rizzo, but other city departments like the Free Library, the Department of Welfare and Recreation, the City Planning Commission and the Streets Department experienced large cuts. The radical group called MOVE formed in 1972, and tension soon developed with city officials. The first major clash occurred in 1978 at the group's Powelton Village headquarters, resulting in the death of a police officer. Nine MOVE members were convicted at trial and sentenced to prison. In 1985, a stand-off occurred at the group's new headquarters in West Philadelphia, whose residents were believed to be armed resisters. The police dropped a satchel bomb on the house from a helicopter; it set off a fire that killed eleven MOVE members, including five children, and destroyed sixty-two neighboring houses. Survivors sued the city in civil court and won damages.

Preparations for the United States Bicentennial in 1976 began in 1964. By the early 1970s, US$3 million had been spent but no plans were set. The planning group was reorganized and numerous citywide events were planned. Independence National Historical Park was restored and development of Penn's Landing was completed. Less than half the expected visitors came to the city for the Bicentennial, but the event helped revive the identity of the city, inspiring annual neighborhood events and fairs.

Crime continued to be a problem in the 1980s. Deadly Mafia warfare plagued South Philadelphia, drug gangs and crack houses invaded the slums of the city, and the murder rate skyrocketed. William J. Green became mayor in 1980, and in 1984 W. Wilson Goode became Philadelphia's first African-American mayor. Development continued in areas in Old City and South Street, and large modern skyscrapers of glass and granite, designed by nationally known architects, were constructed in Center City. City employee labor contracts signed during the Rizzo administration helped set up a city financial crisis that Green and Goode were unable to prevent. The city was near bankruptcy at the end of the 1980s.

In 1985, the MOVE Bombing of the Cobbs Creek neighborhood by city helicopters occurred, killing 11 and destroying 61 homes.

A group of Hmong refugees settled in Philadelphia after the end of the 1970s Laotian Civil War associated with the Vietnam War. They were attacked in discriminatory acts, and the city's Commission on Human Relations held hearings on the incidents. Anne Fadiman, author of The Spirit Catches You and You Fall Down, said that lower-class residents resented the Hmong receiving a $100,000 federal grant for employment assistance when they were also out of work; they believed that American citizens should be getting assistance. Between 1982 and 1984, three quarters of the Hmong people who had settled in Philadelphia left for other cities in the United States to join relatives living elsewhere. Vietnamese and other immigrants from Asia have settled in the city, many near the Italian Market area. In addition, numerous Hispanic immigrants from Central and South America have entered the city, settling in North Philadelphia.

By the end of the 20th century and beginning of the 21st, revitalization and gentrification of historic neighborhoods attracted an increase in middle-class population as people began to return to the city. New immigrants from Southeast Asia, and Central and South America have contributed their energy to the city. Promotions and incentives in the 1990s and the early 21st century have improved the city's image and created a condominium boom in Center City and the surrounding areas.

In 1992, Ed Rendell was elected as the city's first Jewish mayor. At the time, the city had numerous unpaid bills, the lowest bond rating of the top fifty largest U.S. cities, and a budget deficit of US$250 million. Rendell attracted investment in the city, stabilized the city's finances, and produced small budget surpluses. Revitalization of parts of Philadelphia continued in the 1990s. In 1993, a new convention center was opened, creating a hotel boom with seventeen hotels opening between 1998 and 2000 when the city hosted the Republican National Convention. The city began promoting heritage tourism, and producing festivals and entertainment to attract tourists. In 2005, National Geographic Traveler named Philadelphia America's Next Great City, citing its recent revitalization and general compact cityscape.

=== 21st century ===
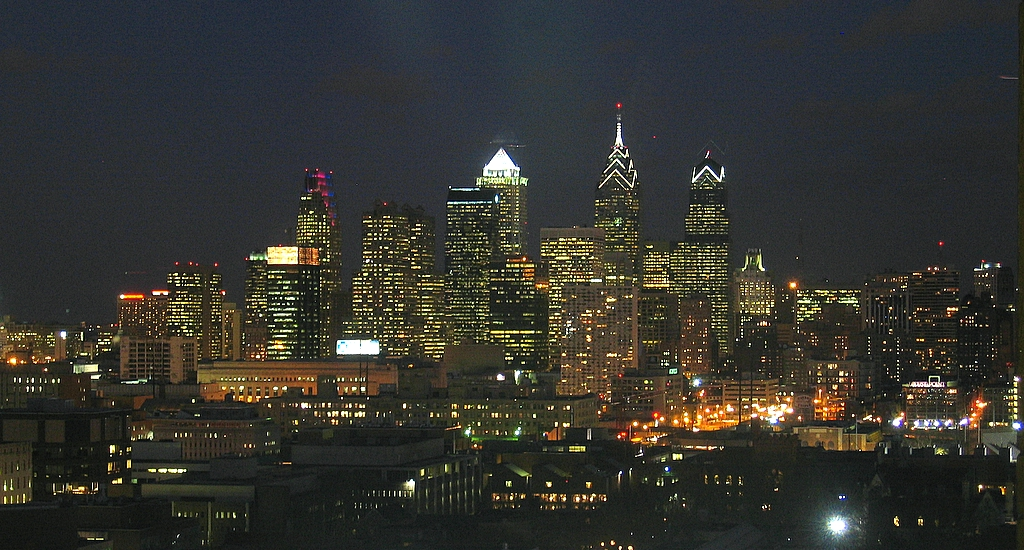
The skyline of Center City Philadelphia in December 2004

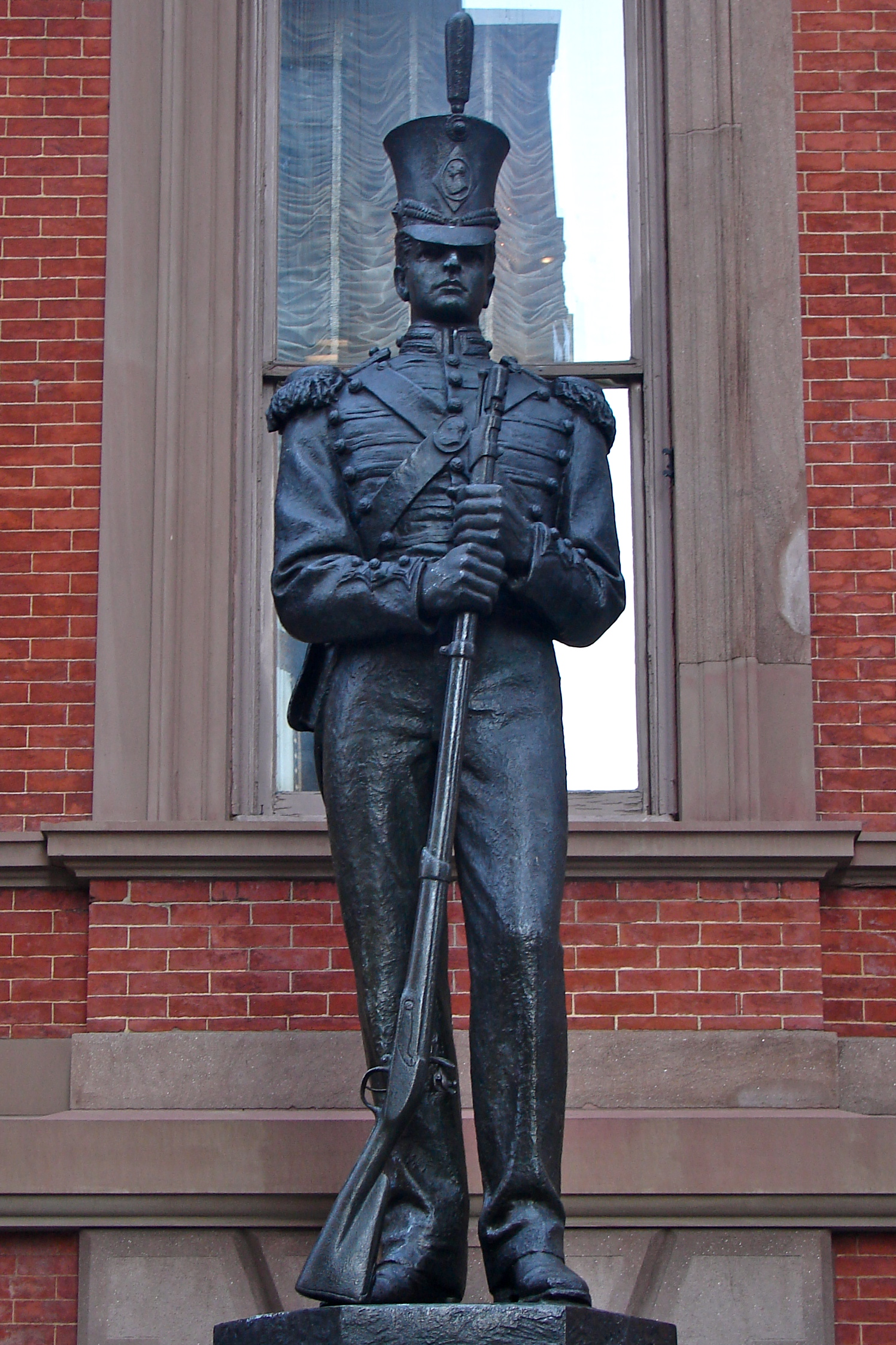
Washington Grays Monument by John A Wilson in front of Union League of Philadelphia in October 2011

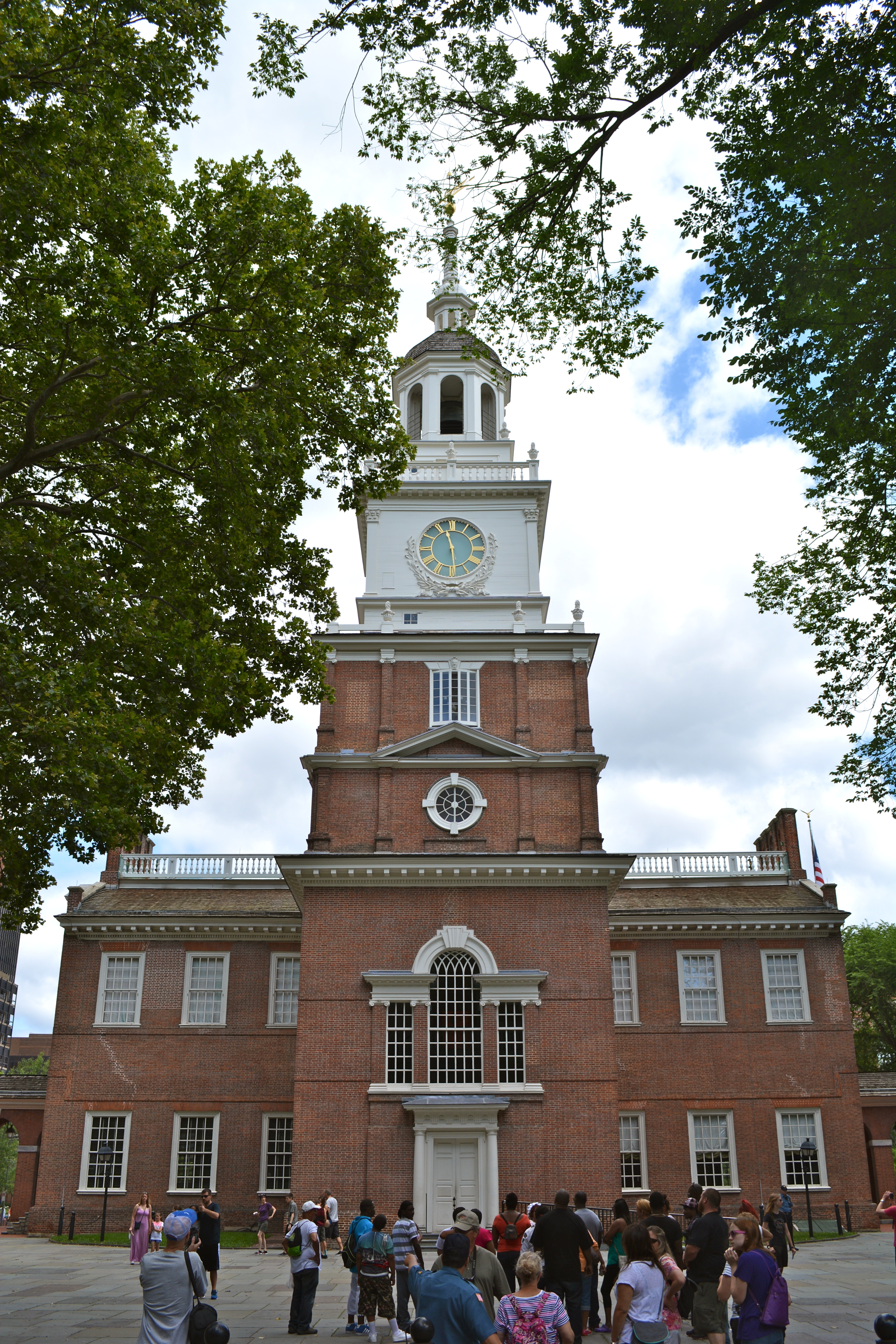
Independence Hall in Philadelphia in June 2014

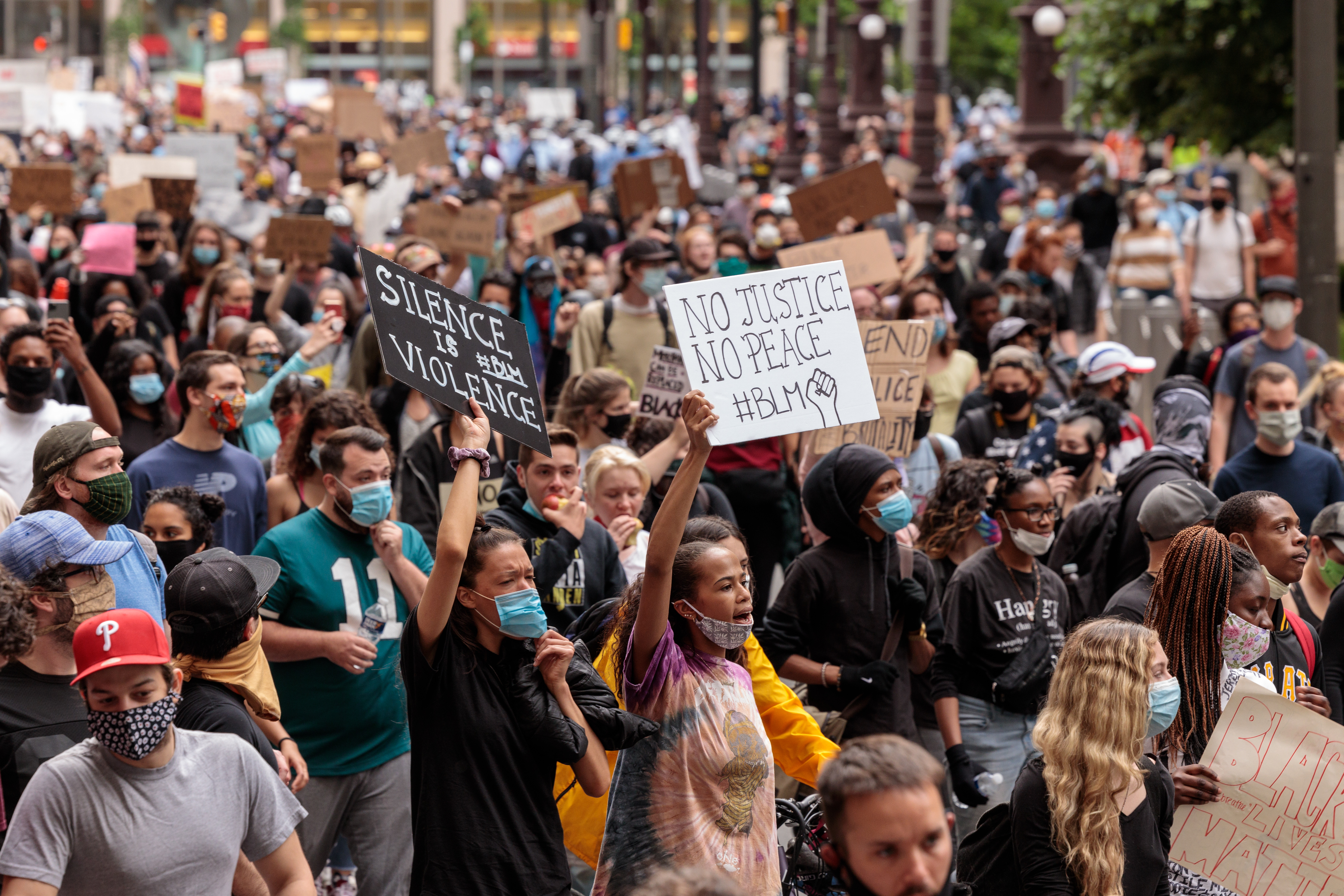
George Floyd protests in Philadelphia in June 2020

Former city council president John F. Street was elected mayor in 1999 and city revitalization continued into the 21st century. The Street administration targeted some of the city's worst neighborhoods for revitalization and made considerable progress. Tax breaks created in 1997 and 2000 helped create a condominium boom in Center City, increasing the population of Center City and helping slow the city's 40-year population decline. The population of Center City rose to 88,000 in 2005 from 78,000 in 2000 and the number of households grew by 24 percent.

The city has had struggles: a series of scandals in the 1990s plagued the police department, including underreporting of crime. The Street administration was plagued with scandal, with administration people being accused of awarding contracts based on campaign donations for Street's 2003 reelection campaign. The 2000s had a rise of violent crime after a decline in the 1990s. In 2006, Philadelphia's murder rate was 27.8 per 100,000 inhabitants versus a rate of 18.9 in 2002.

The remains of the President's House were found during excavation for a new Liberty Bell Center, which led to archeological work in 2007. In 2010, a memorial on the site opened to commemorate Washington's slaves, African Americans in Philadelphia and U.S. history, and to mark the house site.

In 2008, Michael Nutter, with a background in business, was elected as the city's third African-American mayor. From July 2007 to July 2009, the city's crime rate decreased 30%. Nutter helped launch Philadelphia's Foreclosure Prevention Program, which seeks to help residents keep their housing and which has been copied by many cities.

In 2015, HitchBOT and Pope Francis visited Philadelphia during his U.S. tour; while HitchBOT died in here, Francis attended the 2015 World Meeting of Families and said mass to 1 million people on the Benjamin Franklin Parkway.

Tourism has become one of the city's main industries; as of 2018, Philadelphia was the eighth-most visited U.S. city.

== See also ==
- American urban history
- Timeline of Philadelphia
- List of mayors of Philadelphia
- List of newspapers in Pennsylvania in the 18th century#Philadelphia
- History of African Americans in Philadelphia
- History of Italian Americans in Philadelphia
- History of Irish Americans in Philadelphia

== Bibliography ==
- Arrigale, Lawrence M.; Keels, Thomas H. (2012). Philadelphia's Golden Age of Retail. Charleston, SC: Arcadia Publishing. ISBN 9780738592138.
- Avery, Ron (1999). A Concise History of Philadelphia. Philadelphia: Otis Books. ISBN 0-9658825-1-9.
- Bridenbaugh, Carl (1938). Cities in the Wilderness-The First Century of Urban Life in America 1625–1742. New York: Alfred A. Knopf. Archived from the original on 2013-08-01 – via Questia.
- Bridenbaugh, Carl. Cities in Revolt: Urban Life in America, 1743–1776 (1955)
- Brookes, Karin; et al. (2005), Insight Guides: Philadelphia and Surroundings (2nd ed.), APA Publications, ISBN 1-58573-026-2
- Ershkowitz, Herbert (1999). John Wanamaker: Philadelphia Merchant. Boston: Da Capo Press. ISBN 978-1580970044.
- Holli, Melvin G.; Jones, Peter d'A., eds. (1981). Biographical Dictionary of American Mayors, 1820-1980. Westport, CT: Greenwood Press. ISBN 0-313-21134-5.
- Lane, Roger (1991). William Dorsey's Philadelphia and Ours: On the Past and Future of the Black City in America. New York: Oxford University Press. ISBN 978-0195065664.
- Nash, Gary (1991). Forging Freedom: The Formation of Philadelphia's Black Community, 1720–1840. Cambridge, MA: Harvard University Press. ISBN 978-0674309333.
- Oberholtzer, Ellis Paxson (1906). The Literary History of Philadelphia. Philadelphia: George W. Jacobs & Co.
- Scharf, John Thomas; Westcott, Thompson (1884), History of Philadelphia, 1609–1884, vol. 2, Philadelphia: L. H. Everts & Co, ISBN 9781404758285
- Scranton, Philip. Figured Tapestry: Production, Markets, and Power in Philadelphia Textiles, 1885–1941 (1989).
- Scranton, Philip. Proprietary Capitalism: The Textile Manufacture at Philadelphia, 1800–1885 (1983)
- Simon, Roger D. Philadelphia: A Brief History (Pennsylvania Historical Association, 2003).
- Thomas, Allen Clapp (1913), A History of Pennsylvania, D. C. Heath
- Warner, Sam Bass. The Private City: Philadelphia in Three Periods of Its Growth (1968)
- Weigley, RF et al. (eds) (1982), Philadelphia: A 300-Year History, New York and London: W. W. Norton & Company, ISBN 0-393-01610-2
- Young, John Russell, ed. (1895), Memorial History of the City of Philadelphia: Special and biographical, 2 vol., New York

=== City directories and old sources ===
- H.C. Carey & I. Lea (1824), Philadelphia in 1824; or, a brief account of the various institutions and public objects in this metropolis, being a complete guide for strangers, Philadelphia, PA, USA: H.C. Carey & I. Lea
- City Directory. 1785; 1791; 1795; 1799; 1800; 1801; 1802; 1808; 1810; 1819; 1822; 1825; 1837; 1841; 1849; 1856; 1857; 1858; 1861; 1866; 1867
- Watson, John Fanning (1855), Annals of Philadelphia and Pennsylvania: being a collection of memoirs, anecdotes, and incidents of the city and its inhabitants, and of the earliest settlements of the inland part of Pennsylvania, from the days of the founders, vol. 1, Philadelphia, PA, USA: Parry and M'Millan
- Bowen, Daniel (1839), A history of Philadelphia, Philadelphia, PA, USA: Daniel Bowen
- S.S. Moore; T.W. Jones (1804), "Philadelphia", The traveller's directory: or, A pocket companion, shewing the course of the main road from Philadelphia to New York; and from Philadelphia to Washington ... from actual survey (2nd ed.), Philadelphia: Printed for Mathew Carey, OCLC 9501780
- Myers, Albert Cook (1912), "Narratives of Early Pennsylvania, West New Jersey and Delaware, 1630–1707", Jameson, J. Franklin (editor): Original Narratives of Early American History, Original narratives of early American history, vol. 12, New York: Charles Scribner's Sons, hdl:2027/loc.ark:/13960/t5n87rq7c
