= October 2021 sexual assault on SEPTA train =

Assault observed by passengers, sparking debate on their motivations

- Location: Market–Frankford Line, Philadelphia, Pennsylvania, U.S.
- Date: October 13, 2021; 9:20 p.m. (EDT)
- Attack type: Sexual assault
- Perpetrator: Fiston M. Ngoy
- Motive: Unknown
- Charges: Rape, sexual assault and aggravated indecent assault without consent

On October 13, 2021, a passenger was sexually assaulted by another rider on a train running on SEPTA's Market–Frankford Line in Philadelphia, Pennsylvania. This incident gained international attention due to the lack of calls to authorities despite several bystanders around the area, allowing the assault to carry on for over 30 minutes until an off-duty SEPTA employee reported the incident, resulting in the arrest of the suspect.

== Incident ==
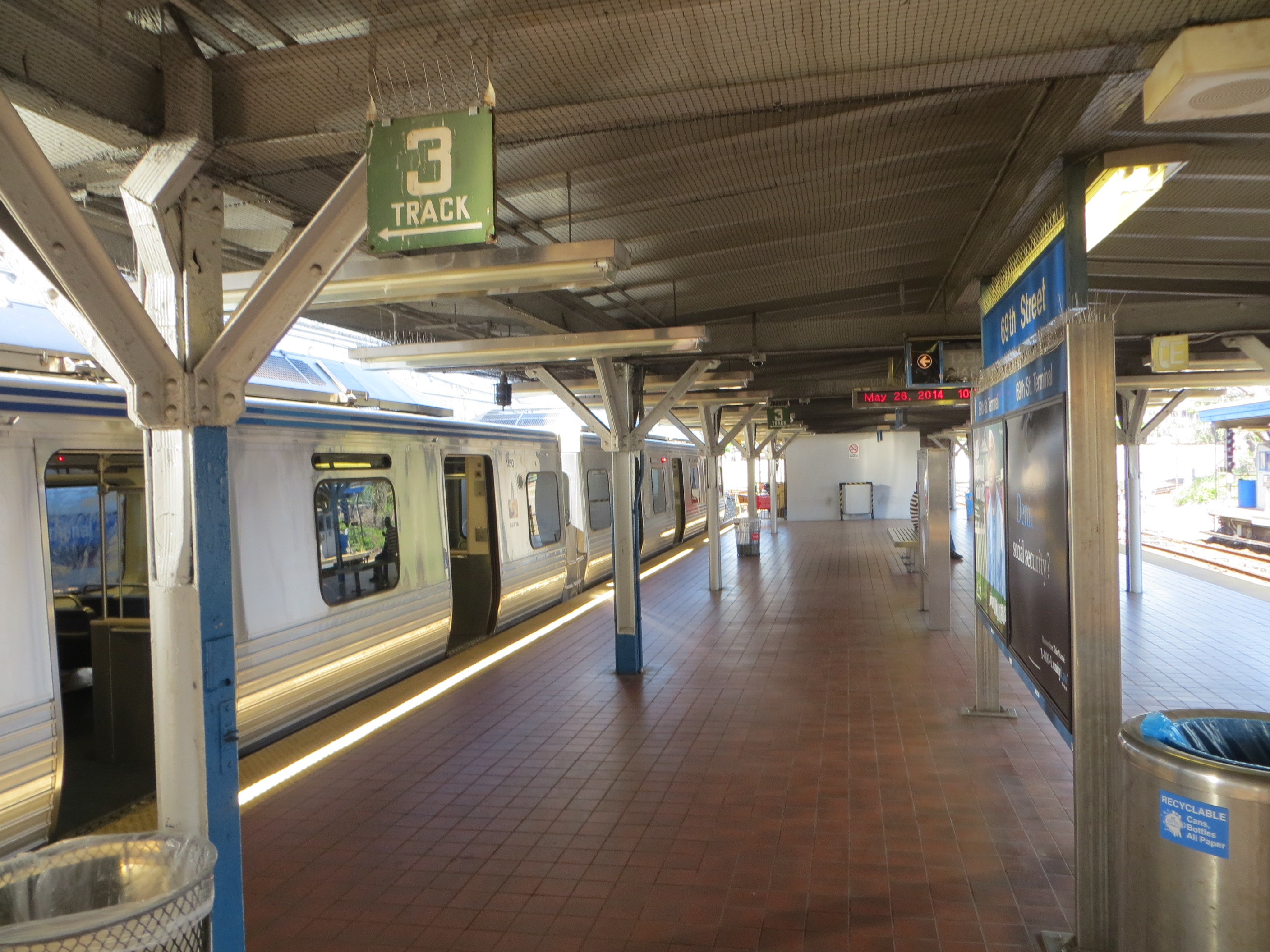
69th Street Transportation Center, where the suspect was apprehended

At around 9:20 PM, 35-year-old Fiston M. Ngoy (born August 8, 1986), an often-homeless individual and Congolese-born illegal immigrant from Philadelphia, began sexually harassing a woman sitting next to him on a Market–Frankford Line train. This continued for about 30 minutes, with the woman repeatedly pushing Ngoy off her until he ripped her pants down at 9:53 PM and raped her for 6 minutes. The train passed over two dozen stops as the assault continued. According to SEPTA surveillance video, there were several bystanders witnessing the incident, even holding up their cellphones during the assault, and failing to alert authorities or stop the assault until one off-duty employee called 911 after boarding the train and noticing "something wasn't right".

After the initial 911 call, a SEPTA security officer boarded the train when it arrived at the 69th Street Transportation Center, arresting Ngoy for the assault after pulling him off the victim. According to SEPTA general manager Leslie Richards, the arrest occurred three minutes after the initial 911 call. Investigators were able to charge Ngoy with rape, sexual assault and aggravated indecent assault without consent after viewing the video recording, holding him at the Delaware County Jail with bail set at $180,000.

During Ngoy's initial court proceedings in November, he claimed it was a consensual act, but the victim stated that was not the case and that she had been drinking before boarding the train. She testified in court that she had repeatedly attempted to push Ngoy off her until she "blacked out". Ngoy had previously been charged with rape and related offenses according to his arrest records. According to subsequent April 2023 report Ngoy was sentenced to 7 to 14 years imprisonment.

== Reactions ==
=== Responses by authorities ===
I'm appalled by those who did nothing to help this woman. Anybody that was on that train has to look in the mirror and ask why they didn’t intervene or why they didn't do something.

— Timothy Bernhardt, superintendent of the Upper Darby Township Police Department

SEPTA and the Upper Darby Police Department condemned the attack and criticized passengers for their delayed action. SEPTA spokesperson Andrew Busch released a statement, saying "There were other people on the train who witnessed this horrific act, and it may have been stopped sooner if a rider called 911."

In response to allegations that passengers holding up their phones were videorecording the assault, Delaware County District Attorney Jack Stollsteimer disputed the claim, countering that many of the bystanders may not have understood what they were seeing. Stollsteimer also stated that the bystanders would not face prosecution charges, as Pennsylvania does not allow for prosecution of witnesses to a crime, urging them to come forward with information about the case.

=== Scholarly analysis ===
Several scholars and social workers cited this incident as an example of the bystander effect, with social worker Kelly Erickson offering that witnesses did not "know what to do, and they're maybe afraid that they'll make things worse by intervening. Roy Peter Clark of the Poynter Institute compared the SEPTA incident to the Murder of Kitty Genovese, which also saw the press push an overly sensationalized narrative. He opined that in the SEPTA case, the narrative painted the surrounding passengers in a bad light, which may have been magnified by inclement weather as well as the COVID-19 pandemic and its effect on the economy and society. University of Miami criminologist Alexis Piquero offered several possible explanations of why witnesses failed to intervene, including assuming someone else would step in or fear of retaliation from the perpetrator.
