= Washington Grays (Philadelphia) =

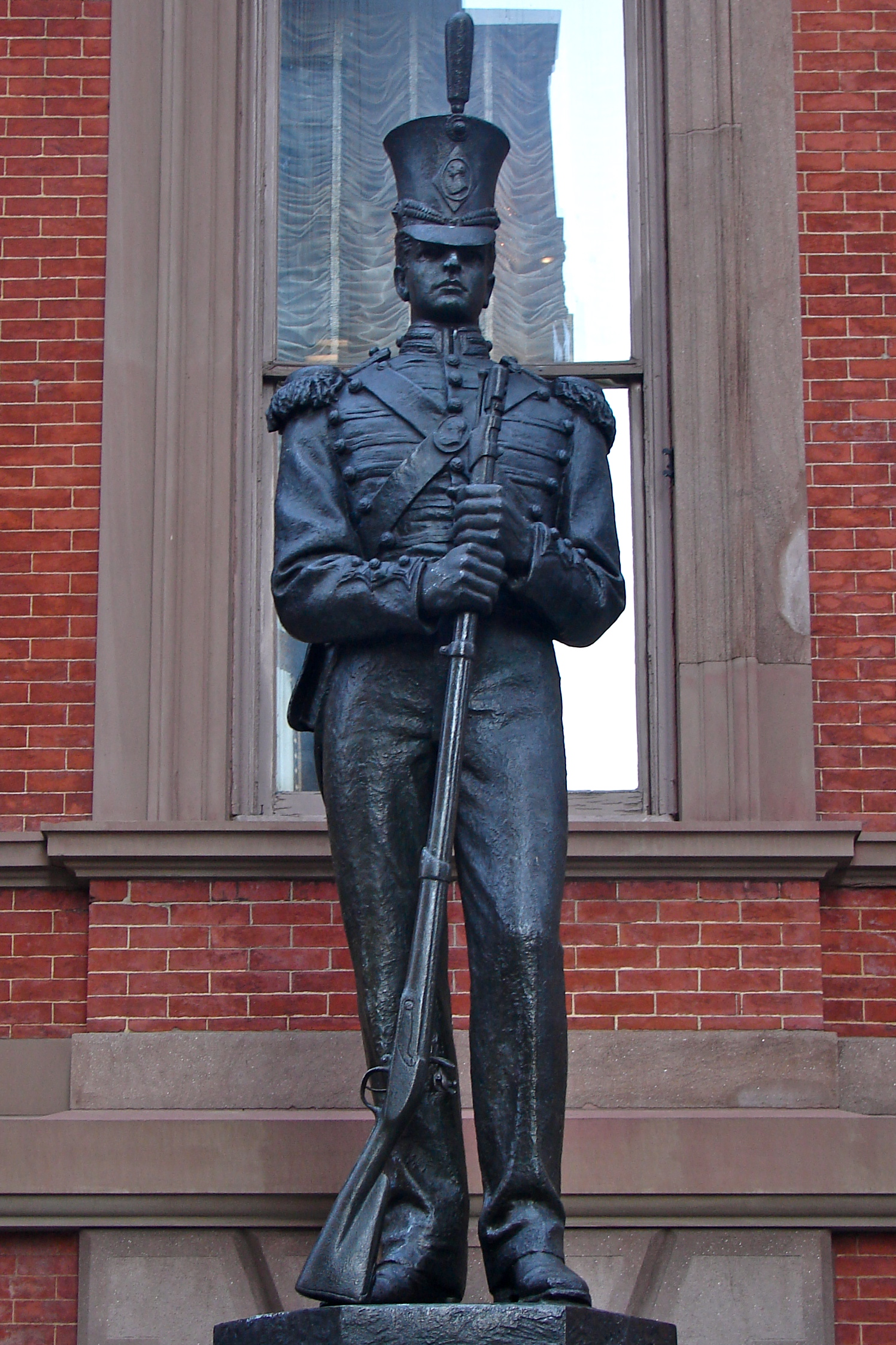
- The Washington Grays Monument outside the Union League of Philadelphia
- Active: 1822 to 1869
- Country: United States
- Allegiance: Battle of Chancellorsville; Battle of Gettysburg; Union
- Branch: Infantry

The Washington Grays of Philadelphia, also known as Volunteer Corps of Light Infantry, Light Artillery Corps, Washington Grays, Artillery Corps, Washington Grays, was a volunteer regiment of the United States. Formed in 1822 in Philadelphia, the regiment became part of the Pennsylvania National Guard in 1879.

John Oppell Foering wrote, "Without question [the Washington Grays] have been the parent and pattern of the militia of the City and State, as well as the foundation upon which was erected the magnificent National Guard of Pennsylvania if not of the entire country."

== History ==
=== Formation ===
Some members of the Second Company of Washington Guards who were veterans of the War of 1812, resolved on April 19, 1822, to form a Volunteer Corps of Light Infantry with gray uniforms of American cloth. "In whatever civic function, where there was the least degree of military flavor the Grays was always expected to perform its distinctive part, and for over fifty years it stood unrivalled in this respect."

The Corps made its first parade July 1, 1822, with four officers and forty-two men, under command of Captain John Swift.

On June 27, 1827, the title was changed to "Light Artillery Corps, Washington Grays." Based on a silverplate "Soldier's Gratitude" presentation trophy dated February 1832 and crafted by T. Fletcher of Philadelphia, L.G.Childs Esq. was their "Late Commander". Fifteen years later, on June 3, 1843, the title was again changed to that of "Artillery Corps, Washington Grays."

The Washington Grays served in the Philadelphia nativist riots of January 1844, and in the Kensington and Southwark riots in May and July of the same year. In 1846 the Corps tendered its services, through the Governor of Pennsylvania, to the President of the United States, as United States infantry during the Mexican–American War. The tender was not accepted, but five members of the Corps served as officers in the Regular and Volunteer Army.

The Corps acted as a guard of honor for the remains of ex-President John Quincy Adams, while lying in state in Independence Hall, March 7, 1848. The last and most important event in which the Corps participated, just before the breakout of hostilities in 1861, was the firing of the salute at the raising of the first thirty-four-star United States flag over Independence Hall, by President-elect Abraham Lincoln, on the morning of February 22, 1861.

=== American Civil War ===
The American Civil War broke out when Fort Sumter was fired upon on Friday, April 12, 1861, and capitulated on Sunday the 14th with no lives lost. The President issued his proclamation calling for seventy-five thousand men to deny Southern independence and defend the Union. The Grays held a meeting and resolved to offer its services at once and recruit the unit to its full strength. It was determined to form two companies.

The two companies which were attached to the Seventeenth Pennsylvania Volunteers, commanded by Colonel Frank E. Patterson. There was delay in starting because the government insisted that no troops should be allowed to leave for Washington unless fully equipped and able to successfully repel an attack similar to that made upon the 6th Massachusetts Regiment while going through Baltimore in April, 1861.

Forming on the west side of Washington Square on May 8, 1861, the regiment marched to the railroad depot at Broad and Prime Streets and started for Washington.

The Corps, while being largely represented at the front during the war, still maintained its organization at home, and in the fall of 1862, during the incursion of Robert E. Lee's army into the north in the Antietam campaign, organized a company of one hundred and twenty-five men, which became Company "A" of the 21st Pennsylvania Militia, and during Lee's second incursion in 1863 in the Gettysburg campaign, on June 30, organized a full Company "A," and part of Company "B", for the 49th Pennsylvania Militia.

The Corps was incorporated April 15, 1867. The regiment served in the railroad riots at Pittsburgh and Scranton in 1877.

=== National Guard ===
In February 1878, when the National Guard of Pennsylvania was being organized, the Corps was increased to a battalion of four companies. Company "A," the original company, was divided, part of it forming the nucleus of Company "D." On July 31, 1879, the battalion was consolidated with the Weccacoe Legion Battalion and formed the Third Regiment N. G. of Pennsylvania. On December 11, 1879, the Governor issued an order consolidating companies "A" and "D" of the Third Regiment, and assigning the consolidated company to the First Regiment N. G. of Pa., as Company "G." At the same time, the "Artillery Corps, Washington Grays," disappeared from history as a separate and independent military organization. The First Regiment NG is perpetuated by the 103rd Engineer Battalion.

== Notable members ==
- L. G. Childs Esq., Commander
- Peter C. Ellmaker, Colonel
- Charles Henry Hunter, Captain
- Hector Tyndale, Captain
- John Swift, Captain

== Commemorations ==
- Washington Grays Monument
