= Union League of Philadelphia =

Private club in Philadelphia

- The Union League Logo

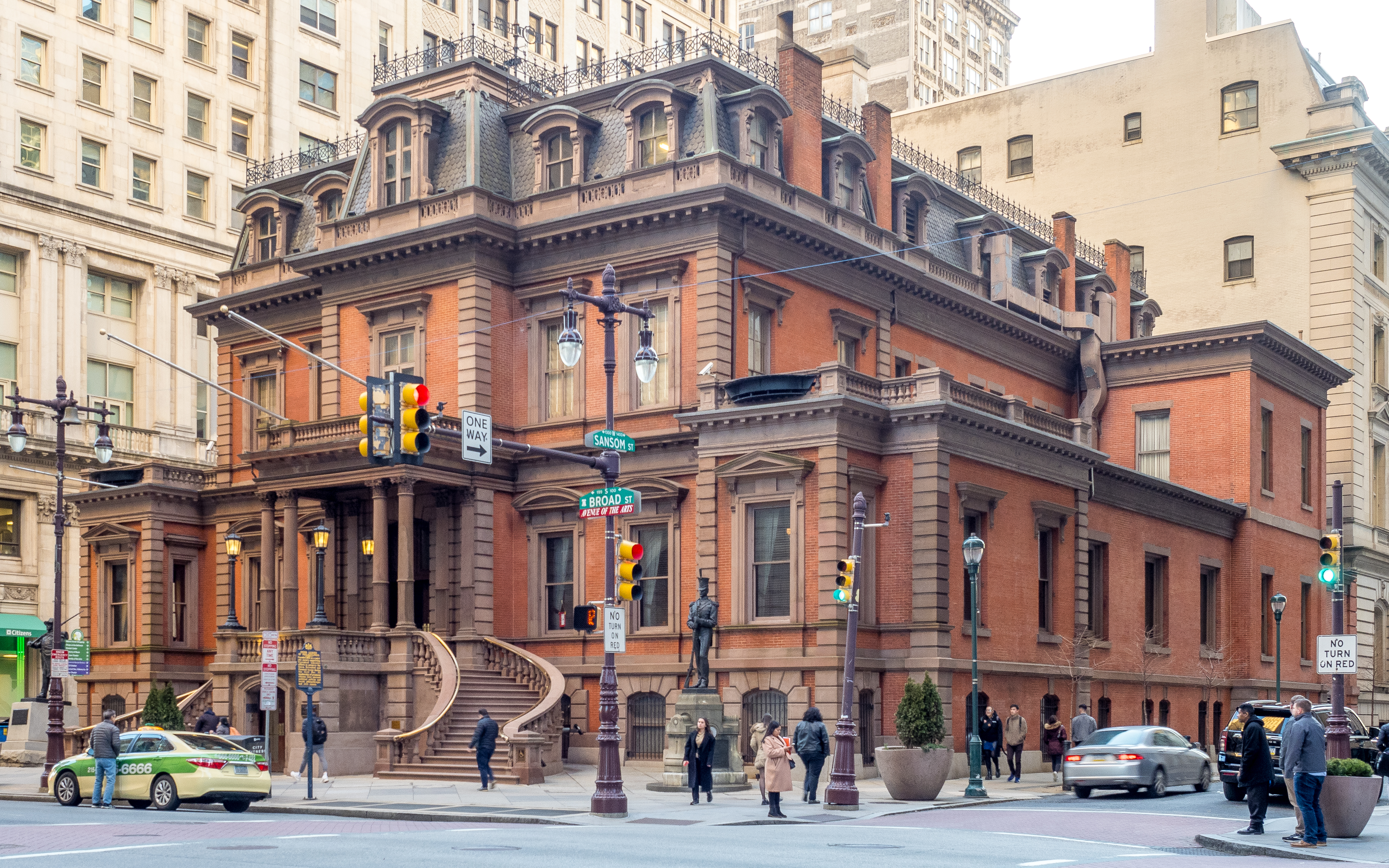
- Union League of Philadelphia in 2024
- Type: Social club
- Tax ID no.: 23-1171350
- Headquarters: 140 South Broad Street, Philadelphia, Pennsylvania, U.S.
- Coordinates: 39°56′59″N 75°9′53.37″W
- Website: www.unionleague.org
- Union League of Philadelphia
- U.S. National Register of Historic Places
- Location within Philadelphia Location within Pennsylvania Location within the United States
- Built: 1864–65
- Architects: John Fraser; Horace Trumbauer
- Architectural style: Second Empire, Beaux Arts
- NRHP reference No.: 79002331
- Added to NRHP: June 22, 1979

The Union League of Philadelphia is a private club founded in 1862 by the Old Philadelphians as a patriotic society to support the policies of Abraham Lincoln. As of 2022, the club has over 4,000 members. Its main building was built in 1865 and added to the National Register of Historic Places in 1979.

Union League clubs, which are legally separate but share similar histories and maintain reciprocal links with one another, are also located in Manhattan, Chicago, Brooklyn, and formerly in New Haven, Connecticut.

Since its founding, it has supported the U.S. Armed Forces in all conflicts. Initially, like most 19th and early 20th-century clubs, the Union League of Philadelphia was only open to White men exclusive to white men, but it started accepting Black members in 1972 and women in the 1980s. The club's Center City, Philadelphia building, a Second Empire-style structure, was completed in 1865 and later expanded in 1910 and 1911. Over the years, the club has acquired several properties, including golf clubs, and established the Legacy Foundation for public education in 2019.

== History ==
The Union League of Philadelphia was founded on November 22, 1862, as a patriotic society to support the Union and the policies of President Abraham Lincoln. It laid the philosophical foundation for other Union Leagues that were later developed during the American Civil War. The Union League has supported the United States Armed Forces in all conflicts since. Its motto is "Amor Patriae Ducit" or "Love of Country Leads." Today, it is the oldest of the remaining loyalty leagues.

=== 19th and 20th centuries ===
Like most 19th and early 20th-century clubs, the Union League of Philadelphia was only open to white men. However, in 1972, the club admitted William Thaddeus Coleman Jr. as its first Black member. The following decade, in 1983, it admitted its first female member: Mary Roebling.

The club's Center City Philadelphia building, a Second Empire-style structure with a brick and brownstone façade was designed by John Fraser and completed in May 1865. The opening was originally scheduled for March of that year, with President Lincoln in attendance, but was delayed due to wartime construction supply shortages. Christopher Stuart Patterson, formerly the Dean of the University of Pennsylvania Law School, was the 13th President of the Union League in 1897 and 1898. In 1905, Philadelphia architect and Union League member Horace Trumbauer won a design competition to build major additions to the building. The Beaux Arts-style additions, completed in 1910 and 1911, expanded the length of the building to an entire city block. The building was listed on the National Register of Historic Places in 1979.

The club has a Heritage Center to store and display its extensive collection of Civil War-related documents and objects. It also maintains a large library for members.

=== 21st century ===
In 2010, the Union League elected Joan Carter, its first female president.

In 2014, the club purchased the Torresdale-Frankford Country Club in Philadelphia, Pennsylvania, and renamed it the Union League Golf Club at Torresdale.

In 2017, the club purchased the Sand Barrens Golf Club in Swainton, New Jersey, and renamed it the Union League National Golf Club.

The club has been giving out scholarships and public education on Philadelphia and the American Civil War since the 1940s. In 2019, it combined these efforts by founding the Legacy Foundation with the goal of "inspiring more educated, engaged, and responsible citizens."

In 2021, the club purchased the Ace Club and Conference Center (formerly the Chubb Insurance Conference Center) in Lafayette Hill, Pennsylvania, and renamed it the Union League Golf Club at Liberty Hill.

In 2022, the Union League celebrated its 160th anniversary through 160 Acts of Patriotism in and around Philadelphia benefitting several local community-based organizations. The club has awarded gold medals, the same award given to Abraham Lincoln, to Florida Governor Ron DeSantis, George H. W. Bush, George W. Bush, and Donald Rumsfeld. The club has awarded other figures in American politics and law, including Jeff Sessions, Clarence Thomas, and Samuel Alito.

== Notable members ==
Members of the Philadelphia Union League included Cyrus McCormick, Robert Todd Lincoln, Adolph E. Borie, Daniel Burnham, William D. Boyce, Charles D. Barney, and George J. Smith. Harry S. McDevitt

== Gallery ==
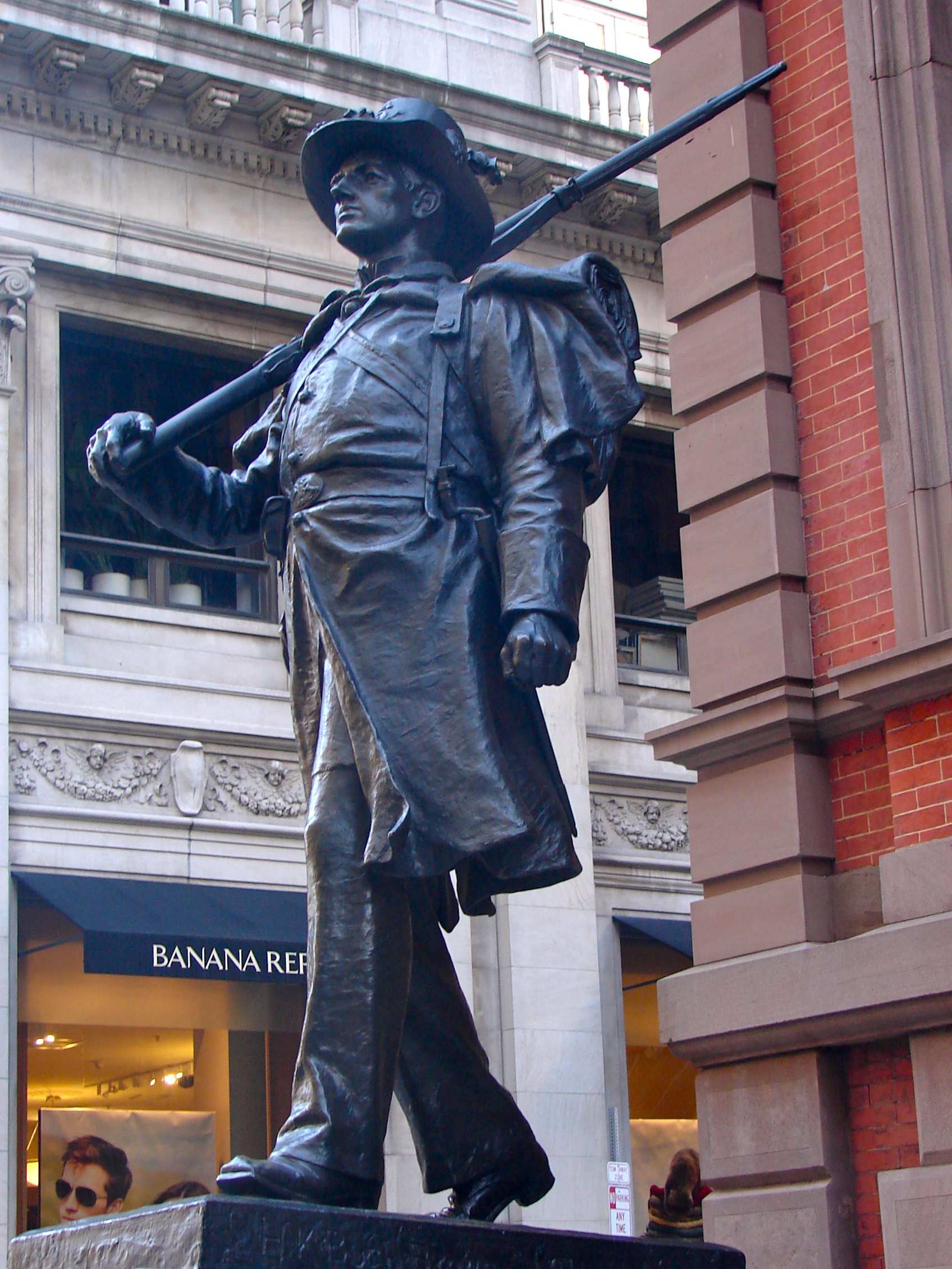
1st Regiment Infantry National Guard of Philadelphia by Henry Kirke Bush-Brown

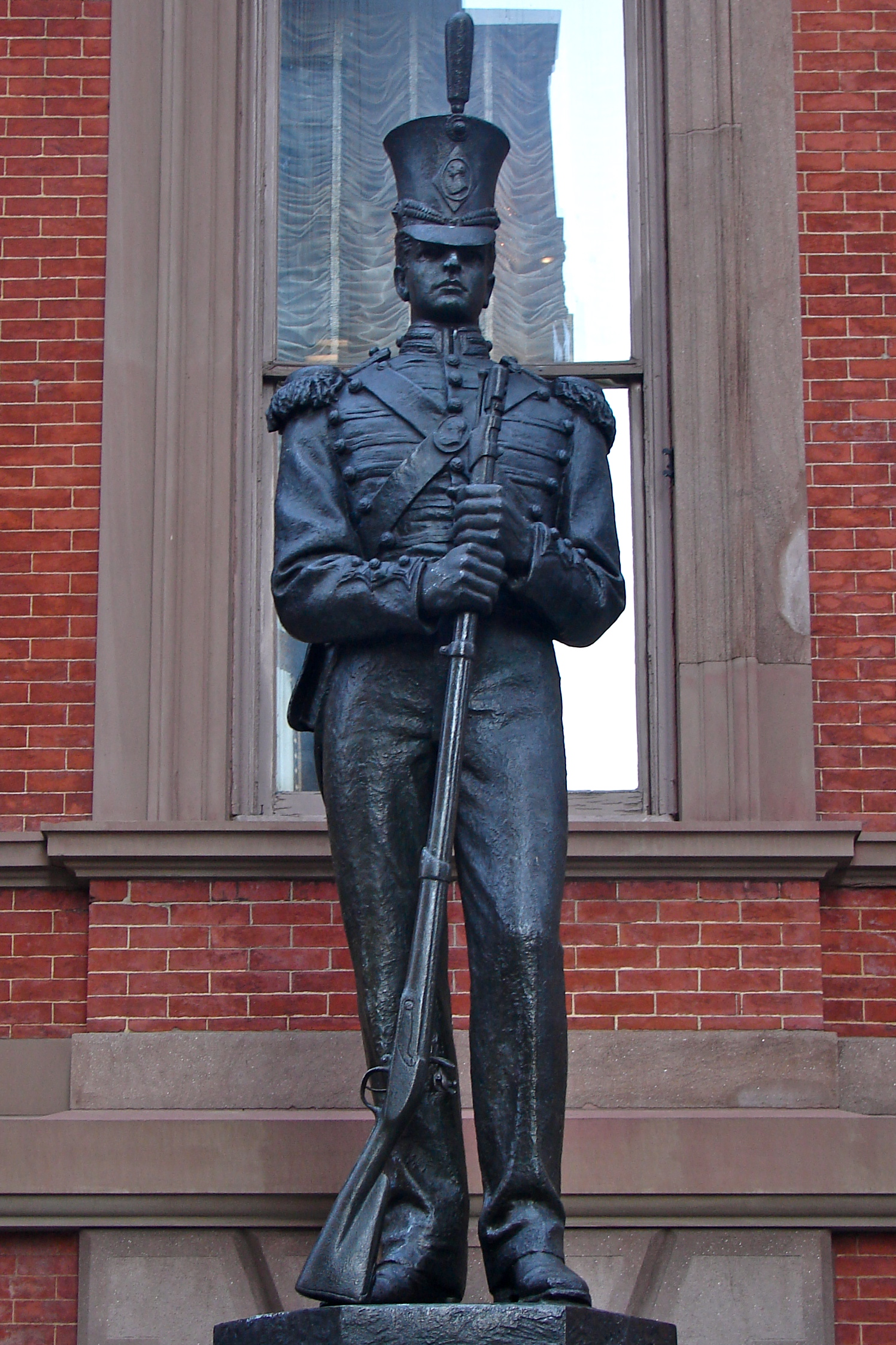
Washington Grays Monument by John A Wilson

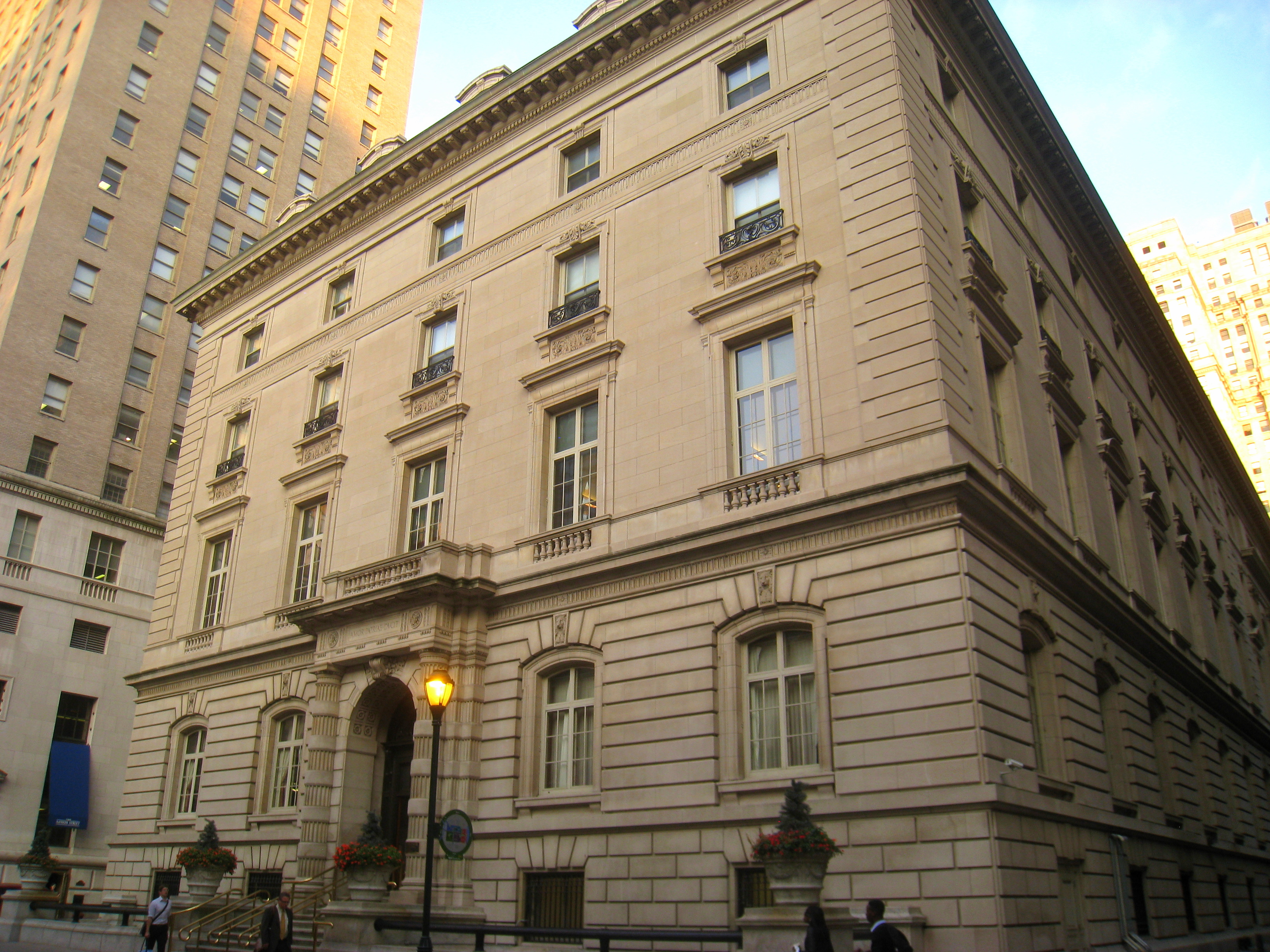
The Union League's 1911 addition, seen from 15th Street

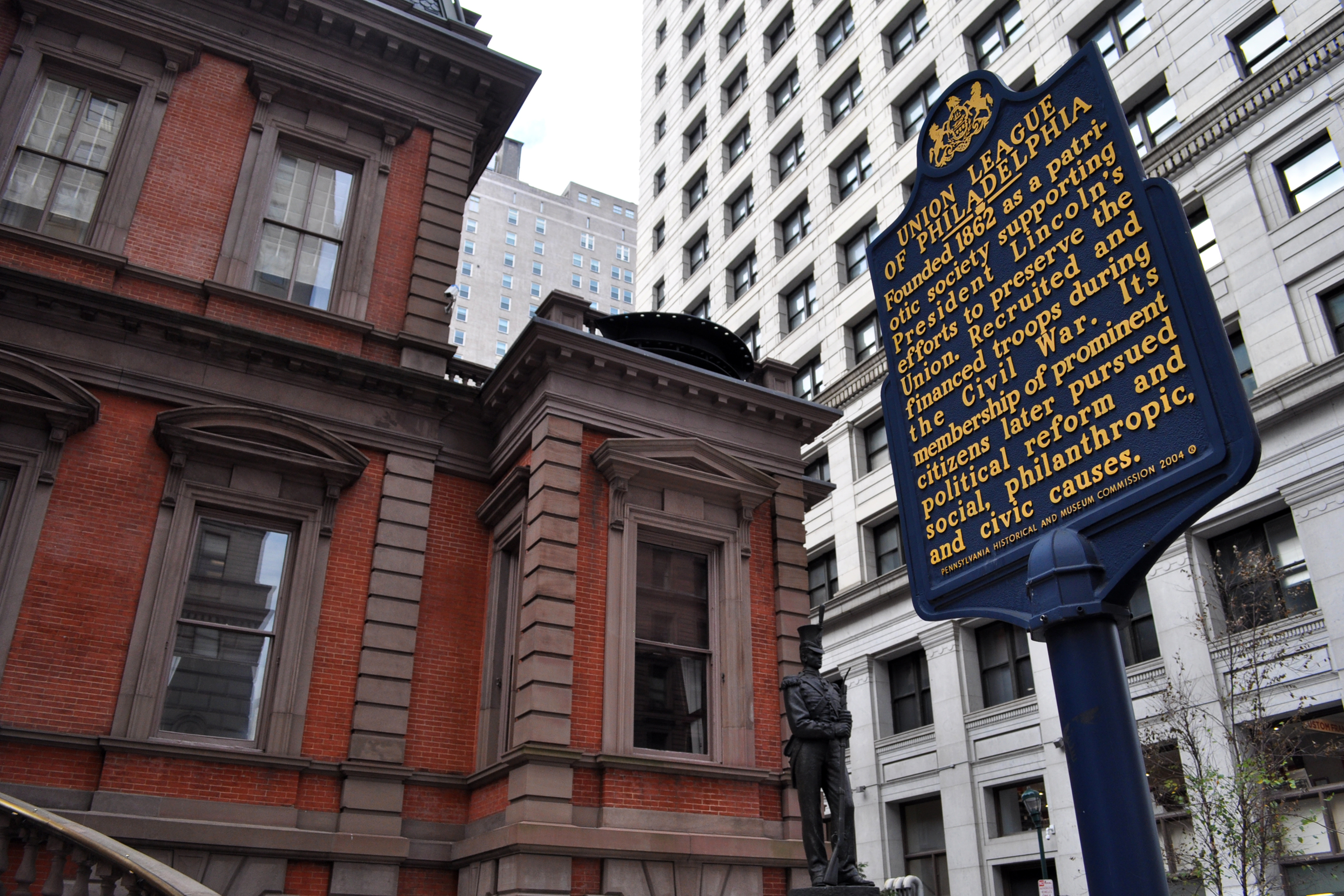
The organization's historical marker

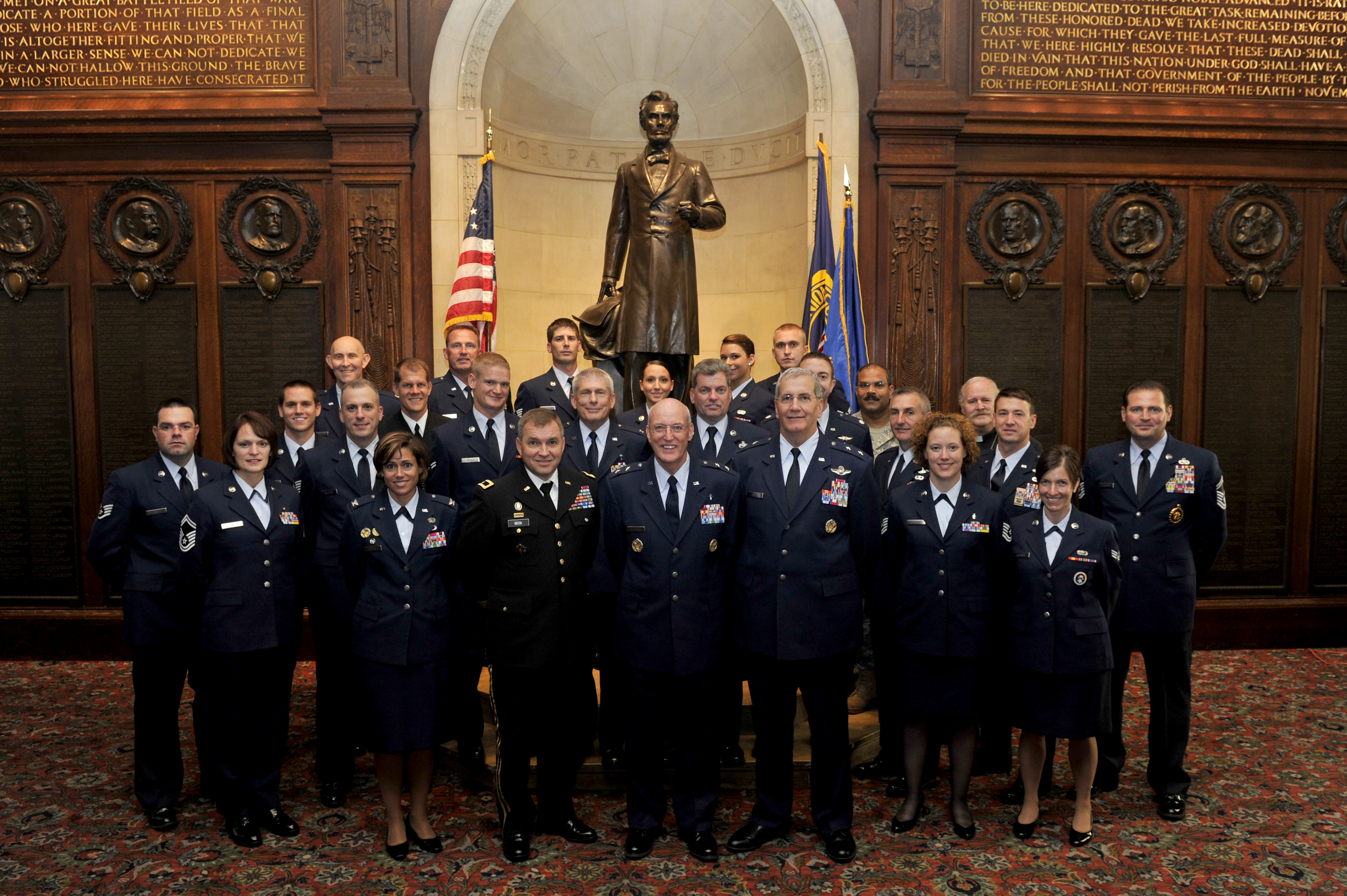
The Memorial Room at the Union League of Philadelphia

== See also ==
- Union League Club of Chicago
- Union League Club of New York
- Union League Golf and Country Club
- List of American gentlemen's clubs
- Old Philadelphians
