= Baton Rouge National Cemetery =

Historic military cemetery in Louisiana, United States

- U.S. National Register of Historic Places
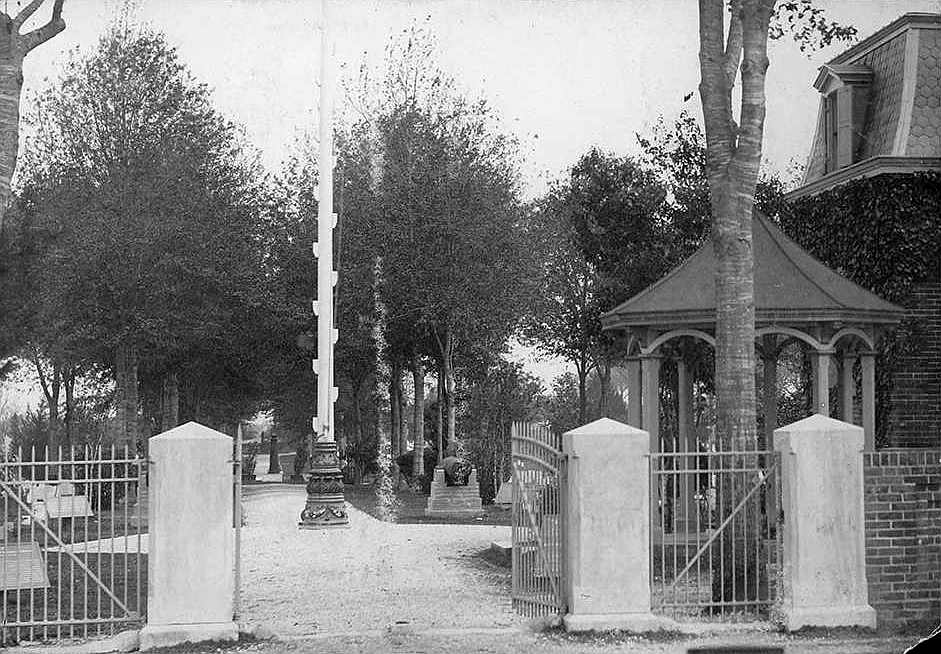
- Cemetery entrance, c. 1899

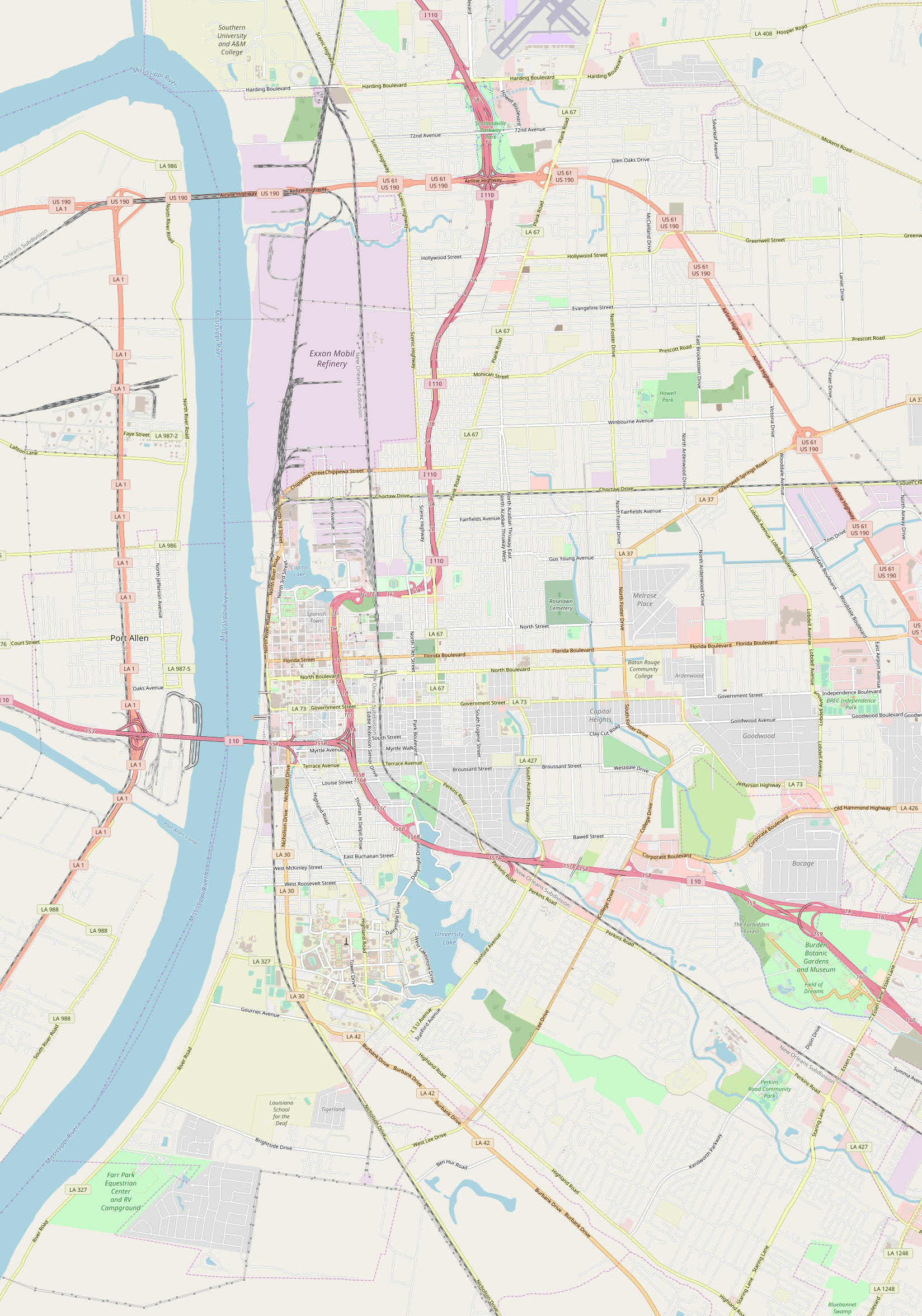
- Location within Baton Rouge
- Location: 220 North 19th Street; Baton Rouge, Louisiana
- Coordinates: 30°26′59″N 91°10′04″W
- Area: 7.7 acres (3.1 ha)
- Built: 1867
- Architectural style: Colonial Revival
- MPS: Civil War Era National Cemeteries MPS
- NRHP reference No.: 97000768
- Added to NRHP: July 09, 1997

Baton Rouge National Cemetery is a United States National Cemetery located in East Baton Rouge Parish, in the city of Baton Rouge, Louisiana. It encompasses 7.7 acres (3.1 ha), and as of 2020, had over 5,000 interments.

The cemetery was added to the National Register of Historic Places on July 9, 1997.

== History ==
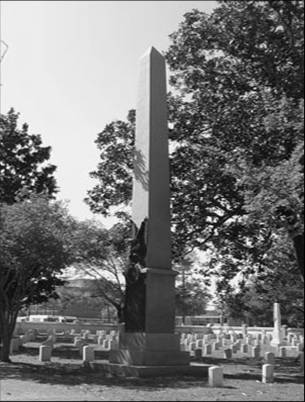
Massachusetts Monument by John Wilson Baton Rouge National Cemetery

Burials in the cemetery grounds took place as early as 1830, but the site was predominantly used during the Civil War to bury soldiers who died in Baton Rouge and the surrounding battlefields, including Plaquemine and Camden. It became an official National Cemetery in 1867, and rewards were given to anyone who reported the grave of a Union soldier, so that his remains could be reinterred in the cemetery. First superintendent was Henry W. Taylor, a discharged 1st Sergeant of Company B, 45th Infantry Regiment.

In 1878 two men, Michael and Bernard Jodd, were hired to build a brick wall around the cemetery, which was previously enclosed by a picket fence, but before it was completed, both men contracted yellow fever and died in September 1878. They were interred in the cemetery and the wall was completed by local laborers. The wall was surfaced with stucco in 1936. The entrance on North 19th Street is protected by a double iron gate built in 1933.

=== Massachusetts Monument ===
The cemetery contains a commemorative monument, erected in 1909 by the Commonwealth of Massachusetts and built by J. N. White and Sons. The monument celebrates the memory of officers of 31st and 41st Infantry and of the men from Massachusetts who lost their lives in the Department of the Gulf during the Civil War.

== Notable interments ==
- General Philemon Thomas (1763–1847). His remains were reinterred in the national cemetery in 1886. He was a veteran of both the American Revolutionary War and the War of 1812, and he commanded the forces that captured the fort of Baton Rouge in 1810. He also served as a Congressional Representative from the state of Louisiana in the 22nd and 23rd United States Congresses.
- Lieutenant General Troy Houston Middleton (1889–1976), World War II veteran and president of Louisiana State University.
- Aden & Emma King, superintendent of the cemetery from 1920 to 1924. Aden died during his service and his wife Emma was appointed to the position upon his death.
- Levi S. Porter, superintendent of the cemetery from 1932 to 1934.

== See also ==
- United States Department of Veterans Affairs
- United States National Cemetery
- National Register of Historic Places listings in East Baton Rouge Parish, Louisiana
- List of cemeteries in Louisiana
