= Washington Grays Monument =

Sculpture by John A. Wilson

Coordinates: 39.9501°N 75.1643°W

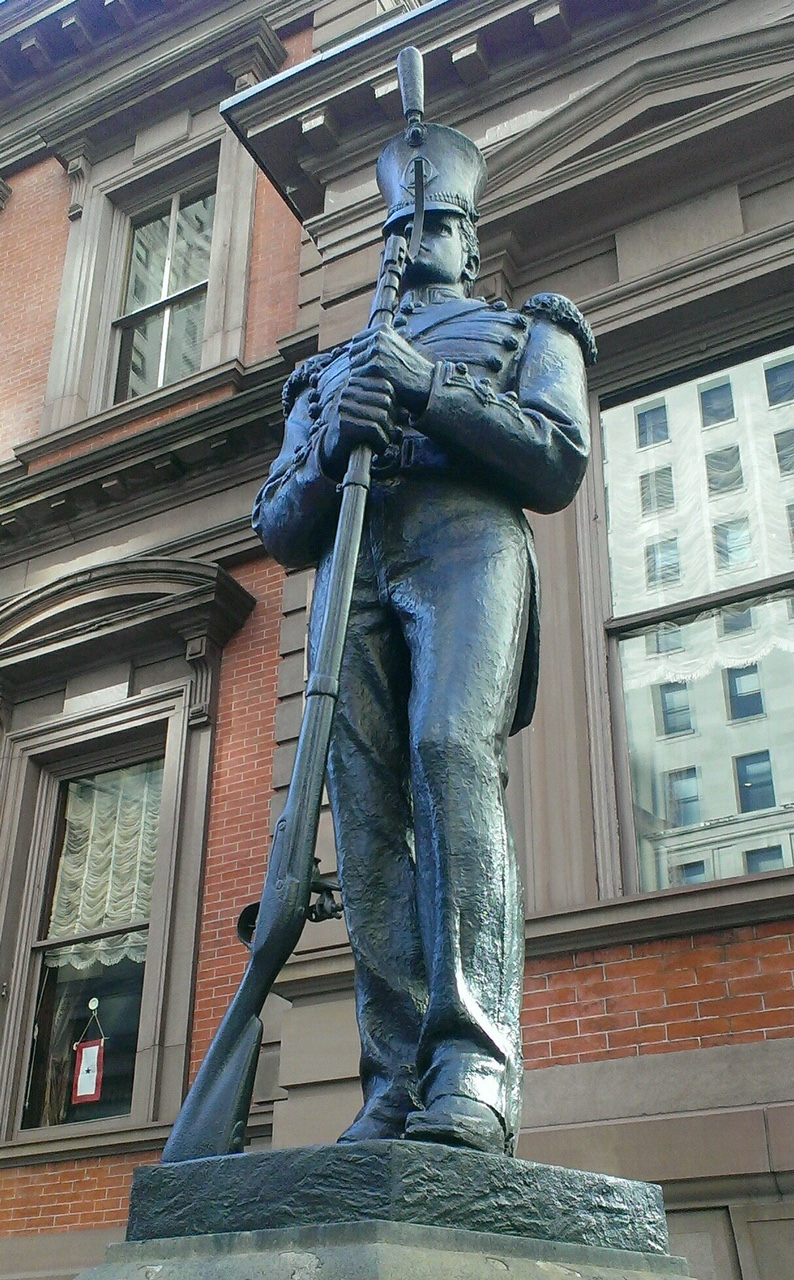
- Artist: John Wilson
- Year: 1908
- Type: Bronze
- Dimensions: 220 cm × 76 cm × 76 cm (87 in × 30 in × 30 in)
- Location: Union League of Philadelphia; Philadelphia
- Owner: City of Philadelphia; Philadelphia Parks & Recreation

Washington Grays Monument, also known as the Pennsylvania Volunteer, is a bronze statue by John A. Wilson. The monument represents the Washington Grays who served in the 17th, 21st and 49th Pennsylvania Militia during the American Civil War. In 1925, almost 20 years after the sculpture was made, renowned sculptor and art historian Lorado Taft wrote, "No American sculpture has surpassed the compelling power which John A. Wilson put into his steady, motionless 'Pennsylvania Volunteer'." Joseph Wilson built the base of the monument which was unveiled on April 19, 1872. Over 35 years later John Wilson sculpted the bronze statue, which was dedicated on April 18, 1908 at Washington Square, and rededicated June 14, 1991 at its present location in front of the Union League of Philadelphia, 140 South Broad Street, in Center City, Philadelphia, Pennsylvania. The sculpture is positioned adjacent to the sculpture 1st Regiment Infantry National Guard of Philadelphia.

== History ==
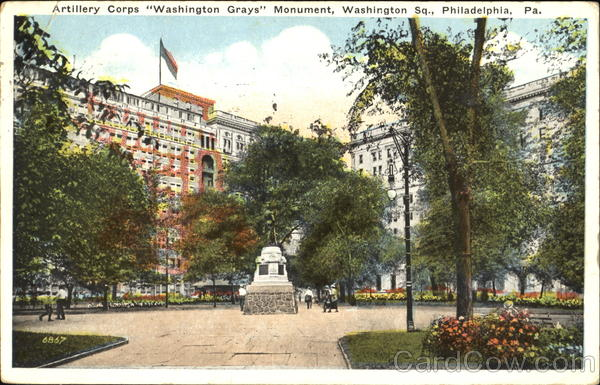
Monument at Washington Square (Philadelphia) (location from 1908–1954)

On October 21, 1871, a communication was received by the Trustees from Mr. Edwin N. Benson, an honorary member of the Corps, tendering "the sum of Two Thousand Dollars to defray the expenses of erecting a granite monument, in a proper place, to the memory of the gallant comrades who fell in the war for the Union," suggesting it be completed and dedicated on the occasion of the semi-centennial Anniversary of the Corps.

The base of the monument was unveiled at the intersection of Broad Street and Girard Avenue, with impressive and appropriate ceremonies on Friday, April 19, 1872, at 3 o'clock P. M., and the day concluded with a banquet of which three hundred persons partook, at the Continental Hotel. The monument was subsequently removed from the place of its dedication to the centre of Washington Square.

At a meeting of the "Old Guard of the Artillery Corps, Washington Grays," held February 22, 1906, a committee consisting of the Trustees and Comrade Captain John O. Foering was appointed to procure and have erected upon the base of the monument in Washington Square a bronze figure of a "Washington Gray" in the old uniform. The Committee reported at the meeting of May 4, 1908, that they had attended to the duty assigned them, and defrayed the entire cost ($5000) out of the Treasury of the old Guard without assistance from any other source whatever, and that the figure had been made by John A. Wilson and had been uncovered without ceremony in the presence of the few surviving members of the old Guard at 7 o'clock on the morning of Saturday, April 18, 1908.

John Oppell Foering described the monument:

It is a figure of a gentleman become a soldier, one who has turned his back upon the charms and allurement of peaceful life, resolved to do, to dare, perchance to die for his country in obedience to the instinct of patriotism imbibed in the first moments of life, while he lay a helpless babe listening to the beating of his mother's heart. If the lesson it teaches be properly learned, love of country will be immortal, and untold generations will accept as truth, "greater love than this hath no man, that he giveth his life for his brother."

In 1954 the monument was moved to Lemon Hill and remained unprotected for almost four decades. The unnamed Grays soldier suffered the neglect of an uninterested public. Bored kids probably assaulted the statue with stones, knocking off his bayonet and plume. The monument was moved to its present location in 1991.

== Gallery ==
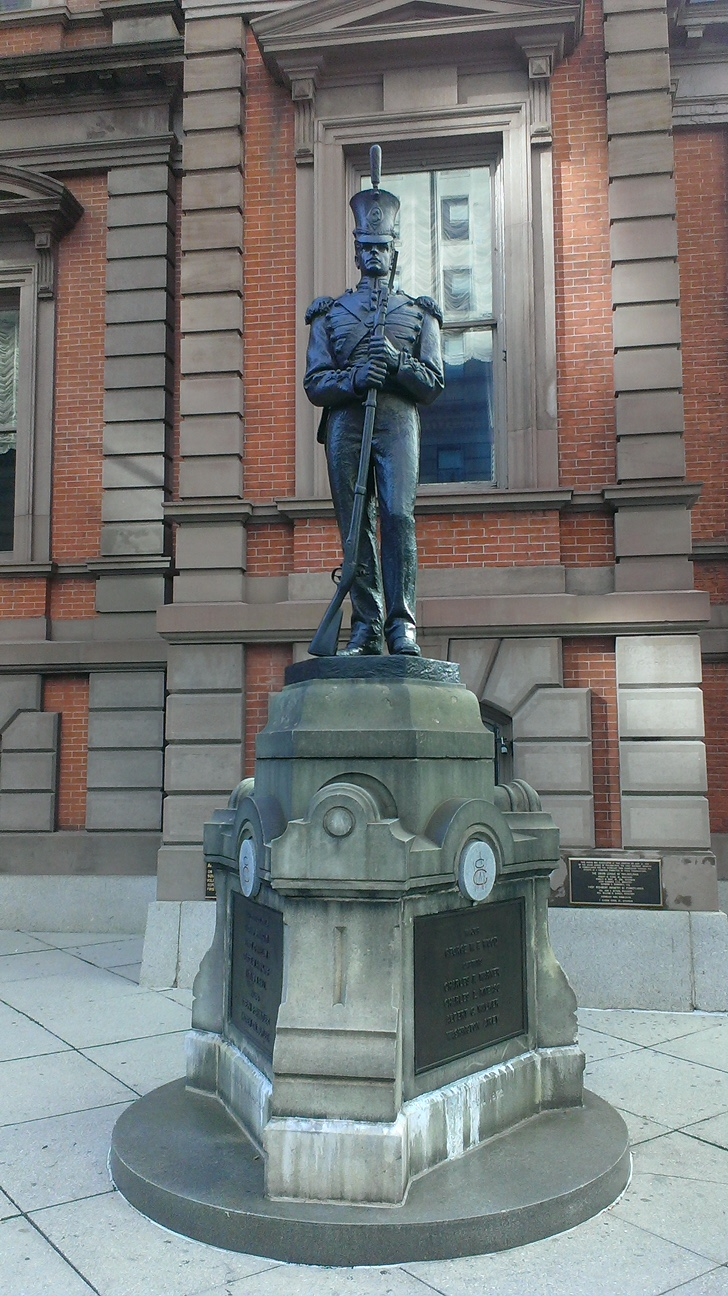
Washington Grays Monument, Philadelphia

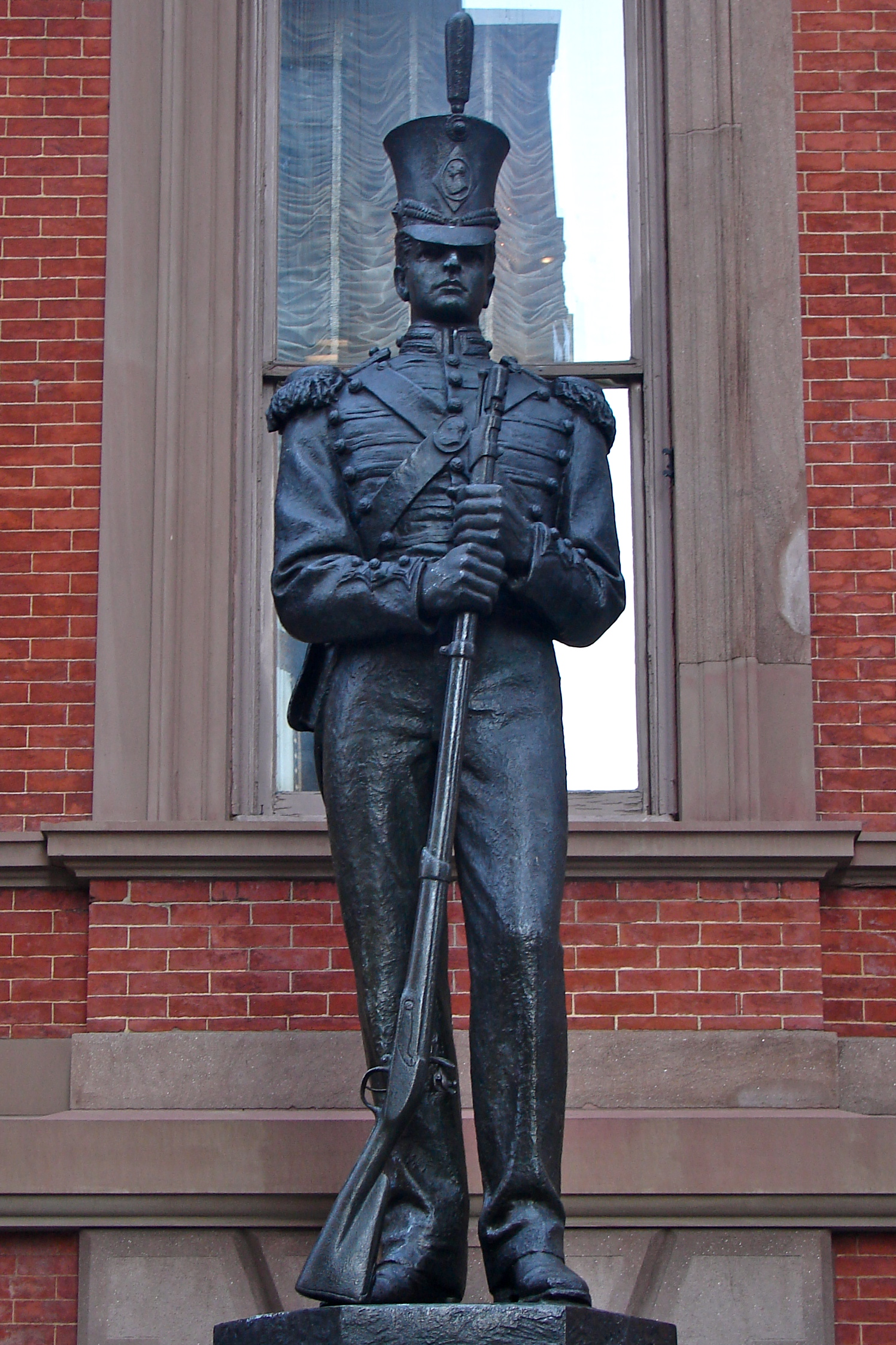
Washington Gray Monument

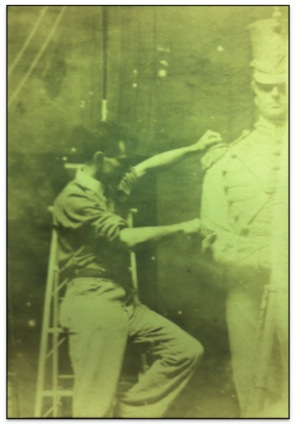
John A Wilson in studio sculpting Washington Grays Monument, Boston

== Inscription ==
The inscription reads:
J. Wilson
Bureau Bros.

(Base plaque, left side:)	(Base plaque, right side:)	(Base, rear:)
Major George W. F. Wood	Lieutenant Colonels	Lieutenants:
Captains	Thomas S. Martin	William S. Sill
Charles P. Warner	Henry G. Whelan	Godfrey M. Brindley
Albert G. Walker	George H. Jawkins	Archibald H. Engle
Charles L. Kneass	Thomas M. Hall &	Willam K. Pollock
Washington Airey	Majors:	Walter Scott
19-April-1872	Joseph S. Chandler	William Bowen
	Andrew Col Suplee	To Our Fallen Comrades
	Semi-Cent.Anniversary	1861–1866

This statue was dedicated at this site on June 14, 1991 By the Union League of Philadelphia. The First Regiment Infantry of Pennsylvania & Fairmount Park Commission through the efforts of a combined committee of those organizations.
The Union League of Philadelphia
Robert M. Flood Jr., President
Stanley W. Root Jr., Esq. Chairman
Leon Clemmer A.I.A., Architect
Raymond K. Denworth, Esquire
First Regiment Infantry of Pennsylvania
Colonel Jack C. Betson, Pres.
Major William M. Barnes, Sec'y
Fairmount Park Commission
F
Eugene Dixon, Jr., Chairman signed Founder's mark appears.

== See also ==
- List of public art in Philadelphia
