= 1st Regiment Infantry National Guard of Philadelphia =

Bronze statue in Philadelphia

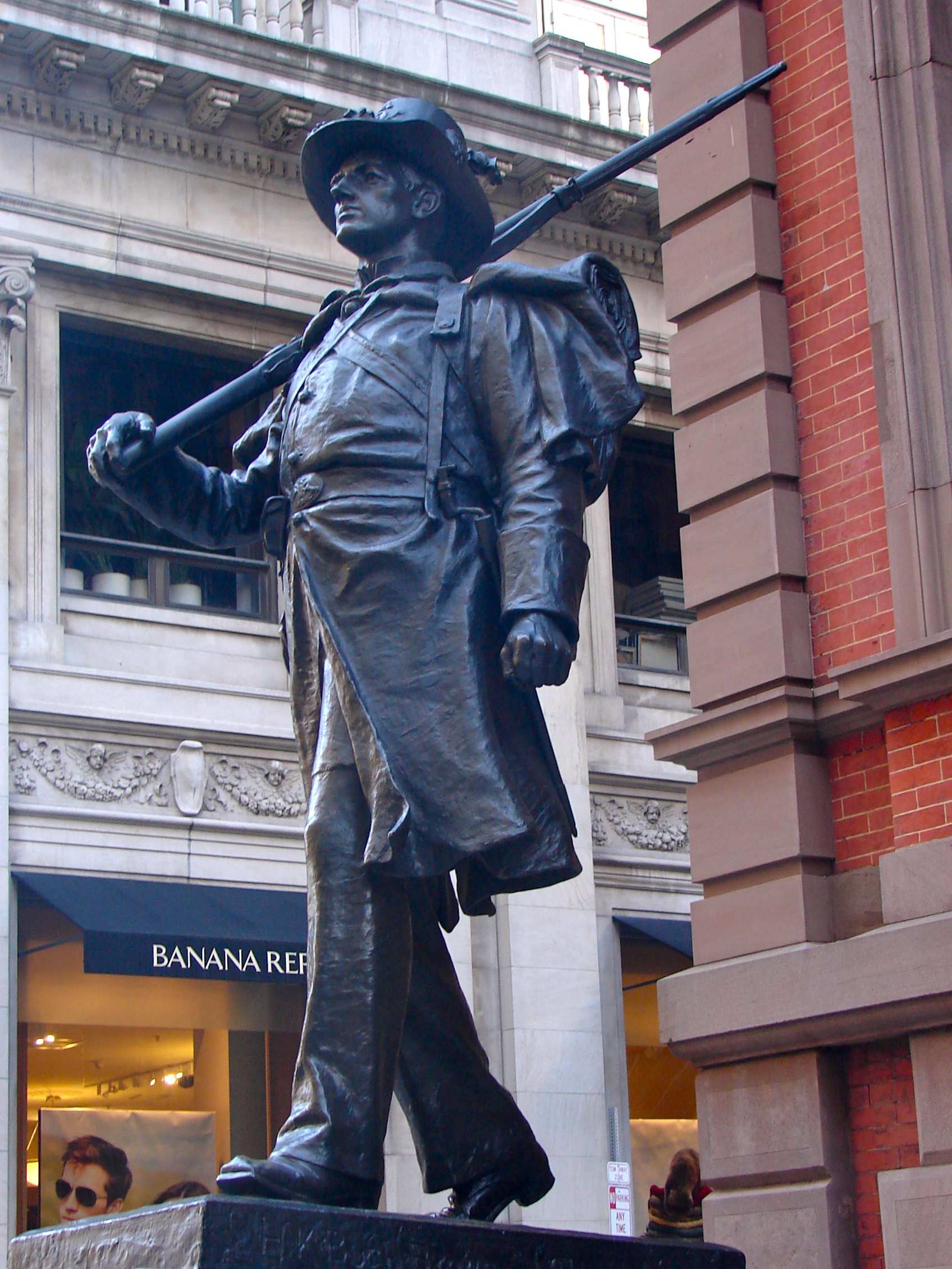
- Year: 1911
- Type: Bronze
- Dimensions: 210 cm × 140 cm × 120 cm (84 in × 54 in × 48 in)
- Location: Philadelphia; 39.949800°N 75.164400°W
- Owner: City of Philadelphia; Fairmount Park Commission

1st Regiment Infantry National Guard of Philadelphia, also known as the Spirit of '61, is a bronze statue by Henry Kirke Bush-Brown installed in Philadelphia at the Union League Club, 140 South Broad Street, Center City – adjacent to John Wilson's sculpture Washington Grays Monument.

== History ==
Commissioned in 1911 by the First Regiment, Infantry of the National Guard of Pennsylvania for that organization's 50th anniversary, this sculpture was installed in front of the Union League building on Broad Street, Philadelphia in 1911, and deeded to the Union League of Philadelphia in 1962 in celebration of the First Regiment's centennial anniversary.

== Physical description ==
The sculpture depicts a Civil War-era soldier marching in full uniform as a member of the First Regiment, Infantry of the National Guard of Pennsylvania. A successor regiment of the Gray Reserves, which was established in 1822, the First Regiment was called to action following the mid-April 1861 Fall of Fort Sumter. The plaque on the sculpture’s base was inscribed with the words: "First Regiment Infantry/National Guard of Pennsylvania/Grays Reserves/1861 April–1911."

== See also ==
- List of public art in Philadelphia
