= 119th Pennsylvania Infantry Regiment =

Union Army infantry regiment

119th Pennsylvania Volunteer Infantry
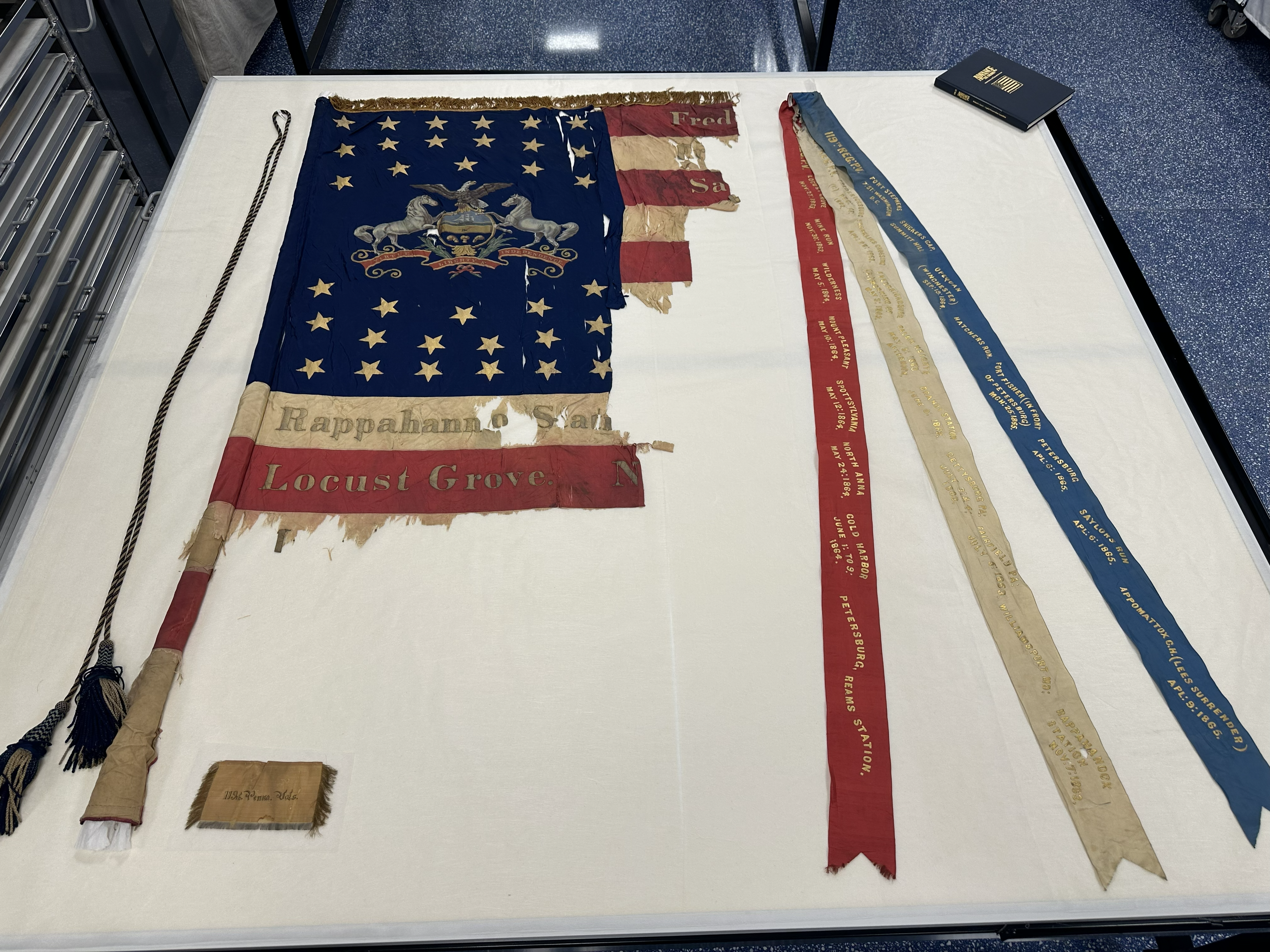
- Active: August 5, 1862 – June 19, 1865
- Country: United States of America
- Allegiance: Union
- Branch: Infantry
- Size: 1,818
- Engagements: Battle of Fredericksburg; Battle of Chancellorsville; Battle of Brandy Station; Battle of Gettysburg; Bristoe Campaign; Mine Run Campaign; Battle of the Wilderness; Battle of Spotsylvania Court House; Battle of Totopotomoy Creek; Battle of Cold Harbor; Siege of Petersburg; Battle of Fort Stevens; Third Battle of Winchester; Battle of Fort Stedman; Appomattox Campaign; Third Battle of Petersburg; Battle of Appomattox Court House

The 119th Pennsylvania Volunteer Infantry was an infantry regiment that served in the Union Army during the American Civil War.

== Service ==
The 119th Pennsylvania Infantry was organized at Philadelphia, Pennsylvania beginning August 5, 1862 and mustered in on August 15, 1862, for a three-year enlistment under the command of Colonel Peter Clarkson Ellmaker.

The regiment was attached to 1st Brigade, 2nd Division, VI Corps, Army of the Potomac, to February 1863. 3rd Brigade, 1st Division, VI Corps, Army of the Potomac, and Army of the Shenandoah to June 1865.

The 119th Pennsylvania Infantry mustered out on June 19, 1865.

== Detailed service ==
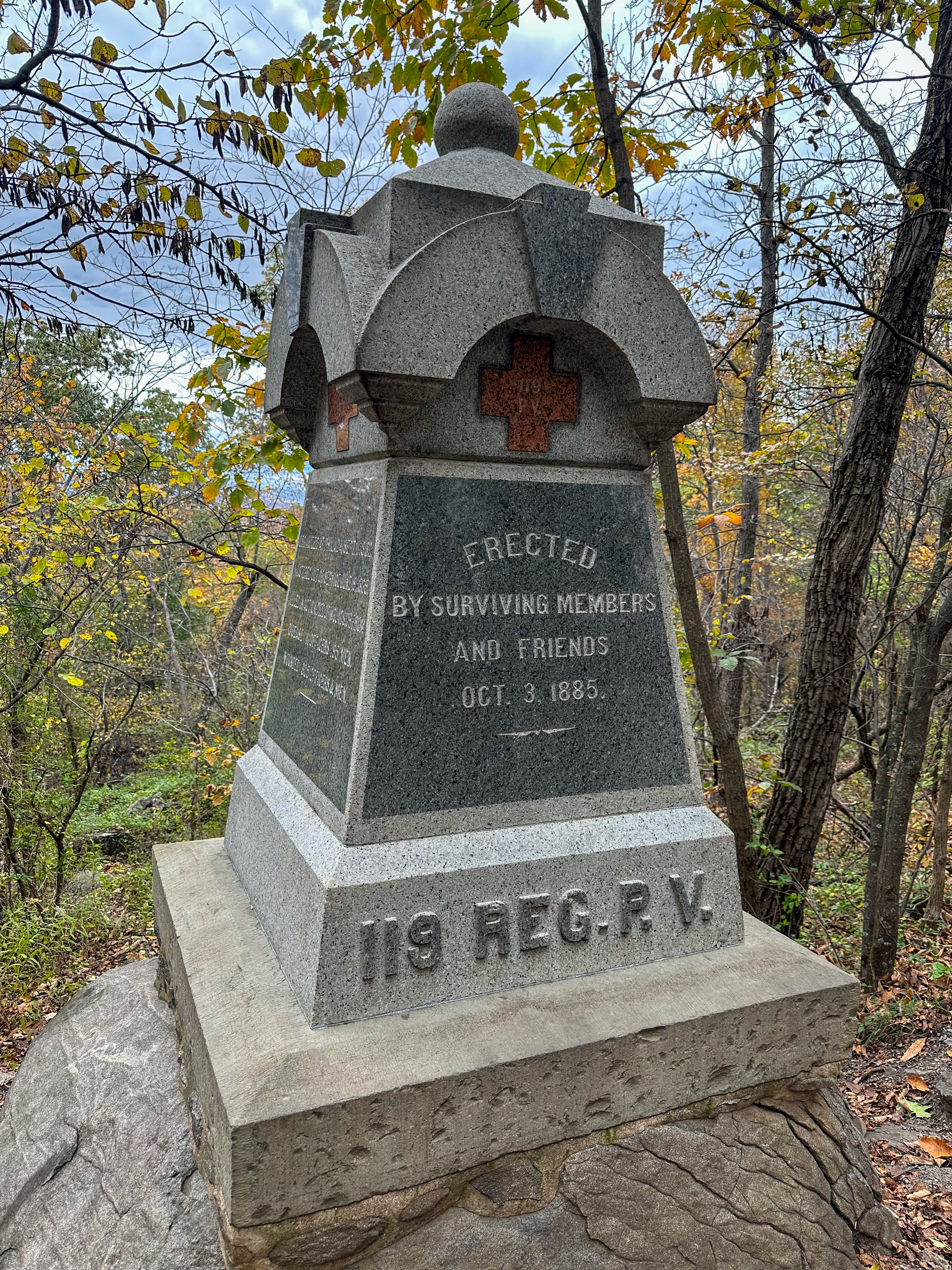
119th Pennsylvania Volunteer Infantry Regiment Monument on Big Round Top, Gettysburg

Moved to Washington, D.C., August 31 – September 1. Duty in the defenses of Washington until October. Duty at Hagerstown, Md., until October 29, 1862. Movement to Falmouth, Va., October 29 – November 19. Battle of Fredericksburg, Va., December 12–15. Burnside's 2nd Campaign, "Mud March," January 20–24, 1863. At White Oak Church until April. Chancellorsville Campaign April 27 – May 6. Operations at Franklin's Crossing April 29 – May 2. Bernard House April 29. Maryes Heights, Fredericksburg, May 3. Salem Heights May 3–4. Banks' Ford May 4. Gettysburg Campaign June 13 – July 24. Battle of Gettysburg July 2–4. Pursuit of Lee July 5–24. At and near Funkstown, Md., July 10–13. Bristoe Campaign October 9–22. Advance to line of the Rappahannock November 7–8. Rappahannock Station November 7. Mine Run Campaign November 26 – December 2. Duty near Brandy Station until May 1864. Rapidan Campaign May 4 – June 12. Battle of the Wilderness May 5–7. Spotsylvania May 8–12. Assault on the Salient May 12. North Anna River May 23–26. On line of the Pamunkey May 26–28. Totopotomoy May 28–31. Cold Harbor June 1–12. Before Petersburg June 17–18. Weldon. Railroad June 22–23. Siege of Petersburg until July 9. Moved to Washington, D. C, July 9–11. Repulse of Early's attack on Washington July 11–12. Pursuit of Early July 14–22. Sheridan's Shenandoah Valley Campaign August to December. Demonstration on Gilbert's Ford, Opequan, September 13. Battle of Opequan, Winchester, September 19. Duty in the Shenandoah Valley until December. Moved to Petersburg, Va. Siege of Petersburg December 1864 to April 1865. Fort Fisher, Petersburg, March 25, 1865. Appomattox Campaign March 28 – April 9. Assault on and fall of Petersburg April 2. Appomattox Court House April 9. Surrender of Lee and his army, Moved to Danville April 23–27, and duty there until May 23. Moved to Richmond, then to Washington May 23 – June 3. Corps review June 8.

== Casualties ==
The regiment lost a total of 213 men during service; 9 officers and 132 enlisted men killed or mortally wounded, 1 officer and 71 enlisted men died of disease.

== Commanders ==
- Colonel Peter Clarkson Ellmaker – resigned January 12, 1864
- Lieutenant Colonel Gideon Clark – commanded the regiment following Col Ellmaker's resignation until muster out

== See also ==
- List of Pennsylvania Civil War Units
- Pennsylvania in the Civil War
