= Peter Clarkson Ellmaker =

Union Army officer (1813–1890)

Peter C. Ellmaker
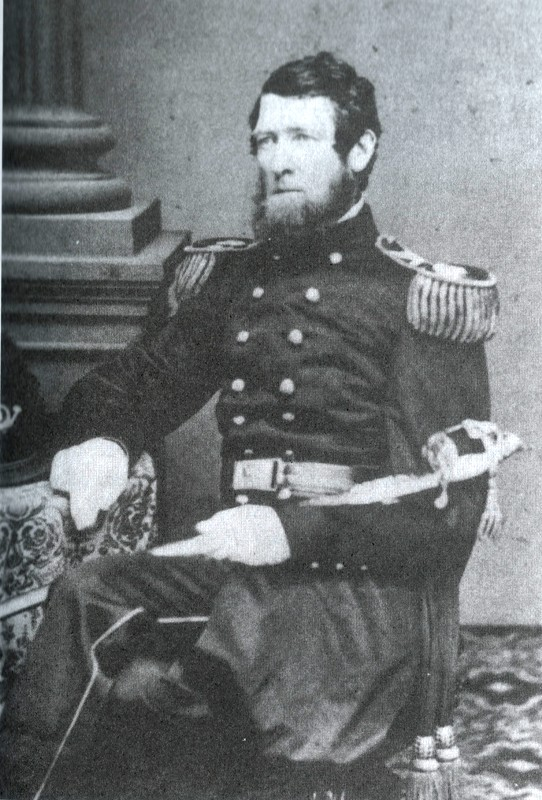
- Colonel Ellmaker in dress uniform
- Born: August 11, 1813; Pequea, Pennsylvania, U.S.
- Died: October 12, 1890 (aged 77); Philadelphia, Pennsylvania, U.S.
- Military career
- Allegiance: Union
- Branch: Union Army
- Rank: Colonel
- Wars: American Civil War; Battle of Shiloh; Battle of Fredericksburg; Battle of Mine Run

Colonel Peter Clarkson Ellmaker (August 11, 1813 –October 12, 1890) was an officer in the United States and Union armies, before, during and after the American Civil War.

== Early life and career ==
Peter Clarkson Ellmaker was born in Pequea, in Lancaster County, Pennsylvania, in 1813. His parents were Jacob C. and Juliana Ellmaker. He attended school until the age of 14.

As a young man, he moved to Philadelphia, first working in the dry goods business before starting his own grocery. In 1830, he volunteered in the local fire department, and was elected chief marshal for a military and civic parade held in honor of General Lafayette in 1832.

Ellmaker later became a notary public. In 1848, he was appointed naval officer of the Port of Philadelphia.

== Military career ==
At the age of seventeen, Ellmaker enlisted as a volunteer in the local artillery corps in Philadelphia, the Washington Grays. By 1832, the centennial year of the birth of George Washington, he was a commissioned officer. During his 20-year service with the Grays, he rose to the rank of captain.

His first active military service was In the Buckshot War in December 1838. The Grays were called to Harrisburg by Governor Joseph Ritner to assist in preserving the peace when the Pennsylvania legislature was under threat by a mob. The incident was later referred to as the "Buckshot War" because of an order specifying that each man was to be provided with "thirteen rounds of buckshot and seven rounds of ball cartridge." The company returned after nine days' service.

During the Philadelphia nativist riots of 1841, Ellmaker was there with the Grays, who played a "conspicuous" role in their suppression. They were on duty at Queen Street, St. John's Church and Kensington.

=== Civil War ===
Ellmaker played a prominent role in organizing several regiments at the outbreak of the American Civil War. While the Washington Grays left the city to serve on the front lines, Ellmaker and others decided to form a company of home guards to protect Philadelphia. On April 19, 1861, as secretary of a citizens' committee, he issued a call for a meeting to organize a reserve guard. Within a few months, they had enough volunteers to form a full regiment of ten companies called the First Regiment Gray Reserves with Ellmaker as colonel. The Gray Reserves went on to become known as the First Regiment, National Guard of Pennsylvania (NGP).

In July 1862, Ellmaker was authorized by Governor Andrew Gregg Curtin to raise a new regiment to serve for three years. Recruiting began in August 5, and by the end of the month, the 119th Pennsylvania Volunteers were called to help defend Washington, arriving with 800 men; Ellmaker was again elected colonel. In October, the regiment joined the Army of the Potomac, as part of the First Brigade, Second Division, Sixth Corps, near the battlefield at Antietam. In December, the 119th fought in the Battle of Fredericksburg and lost several men.

The regiment was then reassigned to the Third Brigade, First Division, and was engaged in the Battle of Salem Church, where his regiment suffered "a terrible ordeal" while the Confederate forces attacking them remained well concealed. Starting on the night of July 1, 1863, Colonel Ellmaker and his command proceeded on forced march from Westminster, arriving on July 2 at the Battle of Gettysburg in time to support the Union forces that had begun to weaken.

Ellmaker was in command of the brigade at the Second Battle of Rappahannock Station, and led his men in a "daring" charge under artillery and musket fire on November 7, 1863. Compelling the Confederates to surrender, they captured "four guns, seven stands of colors and 1,500 prisoners". He received formal thanks from Generals Meade, Sedgwick, and Russell for his "gallantry" in this action. He was also in command of the brigade at the Battle of Mine Run.

On January 12, 1864, Colonel Ellmaker resigned his command due to persistent rheumatism and a pending lawsuit against his family.

== Post-war activities ==
Following his honorable discharge, Ellmaker resumed his career as a notary public.

President Andrew Johnson appointed him United States Marshal, a position he served from 1865 to 1869, and during the Centennial exhibition he served as superintendent of its employees. He was also president of the old volunteer Phoenix Hose Company; a member of the Masonic Veteran Fraternity; and a member of the Veteran Corps (First Regiment, Old Guard (Washington Grays), and First Regiment Armory Committee).

== Death ==
Following a lengthy illness, Ellmaker died at midnight on October 12, 1890, at his Philadelphia residence. He left a wife and three children: Thomas Ellmaker, Mrs. Fanny Gregory of Washington, and Mrs. M. M. Murphy, of Cleveland. He is buried at Mount Moriah Cemetery in Philadelphia.

== Sources ==
=== Books ===
- Hunt, Roger D. (2007). Colonels in Blue: Union Army Colonels of the Civil War. The Mid-Atlantic States. Stackpole Books. p. 63.

=== Newspapers ===
- "Colonel Ellmaker Dead". The Philadelphia Inquirer. October 12, 1890. p. 2.
- "Obituary: Death of Col. Peter C. Ellmaker, a Native Lancastrian". The Daily New Era. October 13, 1890. p. 1.
- "Death of Col. P. C. Ellmaker". Lancaster Intelligencer. October 15, 1890. p. 1.
- "A Veteran Octette". The Philadelphia Times. April 19, 1895. p. 6.
