= Charles H. Hunter (soldier) =

American soldier (1817–1870)

Charles Henry Hunter
- Born: September 29, 1817; Rockland, Pennsylvania, U.S.
- Died: June 3, 1870 (aged 52); Reading, Pennsylvania, U.S.
- Burial place: Charles Evans Cemetery
- Spouse: Emilie Elizabeth Nicholson.
- Military career
- Allegiance: Pennsylvania
- Branch: Infantry
- Service years: 1856–1863 (Pennsylvania Militia)
- Rank: Brigadier general (militia)
- Units: Washington Grays (Philadelphia); 11th Pennsylvania Volunteer Militia Infantry Regiment
- Commands: 1st Brigade, 5th Division Pennsylvania Militia (1856); 42nd Pennsylvania Volunteer Militia Infantry Regiment (1863)
- Conflicts: American Civil War
- Other work: Physician

Charles Henry Hunter (September 19, 1817 – June 3, 1870), was a Pennsylvania militia officer and physician from Berks County, Pennsylvania, who served in the American Civil War.

== Early life and education ==
Hunter was born on September 19, 1817, in Rockland, Pennsylvania in Berks County, Pennsylvania, the sixth child of Jacob VanReed Hunter and Sarah Fisher. He had eight siblings, five older and three younger. Hunter attended college and graduated from Princeton University in 1837 and from the University of Pennsylvania Medical School in 1841.

== Career ==
Hunter began practicing as a physician, but was also interested in military affairs, and he enlisted as a private into the Washington Grays (Philadelphia), a Philadelphia, Pennsylvania militia regiment, and was later promoted captain. In 1856, he was commissioned a brigadier general in the Pennsylvania Militia and given the command of the 1st Brigade, 5th Division, Pennsylvania Volunteers. In 1860, Hunter married Emilie Elizabeth Nicholson.

=== American Civil War ===
When the American Civil War began in 1861, Hunter sided with the Union. On September 12, 1861, he became the Captain of Company E, 11th Pennsylvania Volunteer Militia Infantry Regiment, before the regiment mustered out in late September 1862. On July 6, 1863, Hunter was mustered in as the colonel of the 42nd Pennsylvania Volunteer Militia Infantry, an emergency regiment formed to fight Confederate General Robert E. Lee's invasion into Pennsylvania that became known as the Gettysburg campaign. Hunter and the 42nd Pennsylvania Militia mustered out on August 12, 1863, without seeing any action. In 1864, he became a Surgeon in the Volunteer Aid Corps under the Major Joseph Smith.

== Personal life ==
Charles Hunter and Emilie Elizabeth Nicholson had six sons, Charles H. Hunter (born 1860), Jacob Van Reed Hunter (born 1862), James Nicholson Hunter (born 1865), Henry M. Hunter (born 1867), and Edward Clymer Hunter (born 1869).

== Death ==
He died of heart disease on June 3, 1870, in Reading, Pennsylvania. He was buried in Charles Evans Cemetery.
