= Walker School =

- U.S. National Register of Historic Places
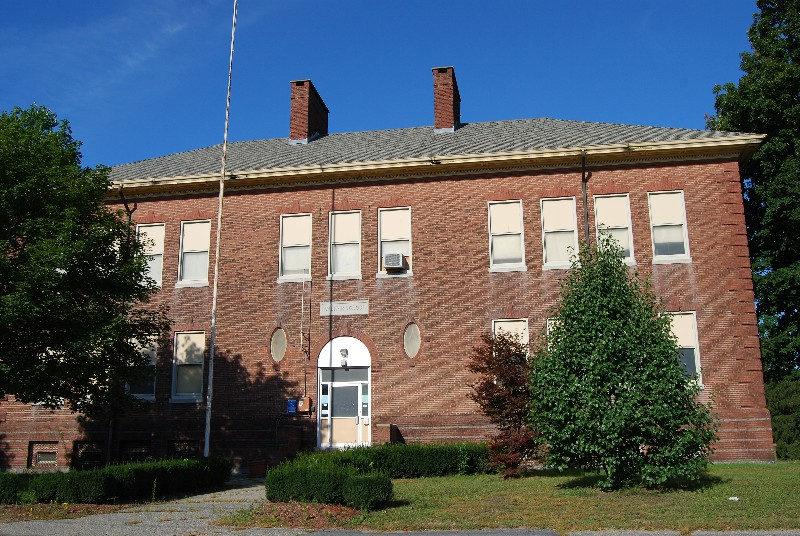

- Location within Massachusetts Location within the United States
- Location: Taunton, Massachusetts
- Coordinates: 41°52′56″N 71°3′11″W
- Built: 1895
- Architect: Crane, E.A.; Williams, F.D.
- Architectural style: Colonial Revival
- MPS: Taunton MRA
- NRHP reference No.: 84002257
- Added to NRHP: July 5, 1984

The Walker School is a historic elementary school building on Berkley Street in Taunton, Massachusetts. It is a two-story brick Georgian Revival building, with a hip roof. Its main facade is 11 bays wide, organized in a 4-3-4 pattern. The main entrance is in the center bay, set in a round-arch opening, with the flanking bays having small oval windows; the remaining fenestration is sash windows.

The school was designed by E. A. Crane, a local architect, and was built in 1895 in land donated by William Ellery Walker, a local businessman. The building was listed on the National Register of Historic Places in 1984.

A plan to demolish the school was circulated in 2005, but the plan was postponed for approval.

Walker School was closed by the city in June 2010. At the time, it held classes for grades K through 4.

== See also ==
- National Register of Historic Places listings in Taunton, Massachusetts
