= Pennsylvania in the American Civil War =

During the American Civil War, the Commonwealth of Pennsylvania played a critical role in the Union, providing a substantial supply of military personnel, equipment, and leadership to the Federal government. The state raised over 360,000 soldiers for the Federal armies. It served as a significant source of artillery guns, small arms, ammunition, armor for the new revolutionary style of ironclad types of gunboats for the rapidly expanding United States Navy, and food supplies. The Phoenixville Iron Company by itself produced well over 1,000 cannons, and the Frankford Arsenal was a major supply depot.

Pennsylvania was the site of the bloodiest battle of the war, the Battle of Gettysburg, which became widely known as one of the turning points of the Civil War. Numerous more minor engagements and skirmishes were also fought in Pennsylvania during the 1863 Gettysburg campaign, as well as the following year during a Confederate cavalry raid that culminated in the burning of much of Chambersburg, Pennsylvania.

Several significant Federal leaders hailed from the Commonwealth. Military leaders from Pennsylvania included Generals George G. Meade (the victorious commander at Gettysburg and from Philadelphia), Winfield S. Hancock, John F. Reynolds, Admiral David D. Porter, and Quartermaster General Montgomery C. Meigs. Pennsylvanians also rose to prominence as political figures during the war, like Secretary of War Simon Cameron and the fiery Radical Republican abolitionist Representative Thaddeus Stevens. A small number of Pennsylvanians joined the ranks of the Confederacy, including such leaders Generals John C. Pemberton and Josiah Gorgas.

== Recruitment ==
The Drum Corps of the 1st Pennsylvania Regiment

Over 360,000 Pennsylvanians served in the Union Army, more than any other Northern state except New York. (Other states sent larger proportions of their population, but not larger numbers.) Beginning with President Lincoln's first call for troops and continuing throughout the war, Pennsylvania mustered 215 infantry regiments, as well as dozens of emergency militia regiments that were raised to repel threatened invasions in 1862 and 1863 by the Confederate States Army. Twenty-two cavalry regiments were also mustered, as well as dozens of light artillery batteries.

Most Pennsylvania soldiers fought in the Eastern Theater, with only about 10% serving elsewhere. The thirteen regiments of the Pennsylvania Reserves fought as the only army division all from a single state, and saw action in most of the major campaigns and battles of the Army of the Potomac. The Philadelphia Brigade was also a rarity in that all of its regiments were recruited from a single city. In an unusual circumstance, the Philadelphia Corn Exchange sponsored and paid for a regiment, the 118th, which became known as the "Corn Exchange Regiment."

The 47th Pennsylvania Infantry Regiment, one of the regiments which initially served in the Eastern and Lower Seaboard Theaters, went on to become the only regiment from Pennsylvania to both fight in the Union's 1864 Red River Campaign across Louisiana and to have men confined as POWs at Camp Ford, the largest Confederate States Army prison west of the Mississippi River. After the 47th's return to the Eastern Theater in July of that same year, the regiment then participated in a brief encounter at Snicker's Gap before engaging in the intense fighting of Sheridan's 1864 Shenandoah Valley Campaign in Virginia, including during the battles of Berryville, Opequon (Third Winchester), Fisher's Hill, and Cedar Creek.

Most of the new Pennsylvania regiments were organized and trained at sprawling Camp Curtin near Harrisburg, and thousands of soldiers from other states. Other significant training sites were near Pittsburgh, Easton, Philadelphia, and West Chester. Over 100 soldiers from Pennsylvania units would win the Medal of Honor for their actions during the conflict. Pennsylvania ranked first in the number of black soldiers (8,612) mustered into the Union Army, forming eleven regiments of U.S. Colored Troops. Most of these trained at Camp William Penn, established in 1863 north of Philadelphia, the only camp used to train Colored Troops exclusively. The 47th Pennsylvania Infantry also became an integrated regiment in October 1862 when several formerly enslaved Black men enlisted with the regiment while it was stationed in South Carolina, and was integrated further with the enlistment of additional formerly enslaved Black men in 1864 while the regiment was engaged in the Union's Red River Campaign across Louisiana.

Leading major generals from Pennsylvania included Winfield S. Hancock, John F. Reynolds, Samuel W. Crawford, John W. Geary, and John F. Hartranft (the latter two would use their military careers to propel them to the governorship following the war). Although he was born in Spain, George G. Meade lived much of his life in Pennsylvania and is buried in Philadelphia. Herman Haupt, who commanded the U.S. Military Railroad, revolutionized military transportation in the United States and was one of the unsung heroes of the war. Significant naval leaders included Admiral David D. Porter and Rear Admiral John Dahlgren.

== War material and logistics ==
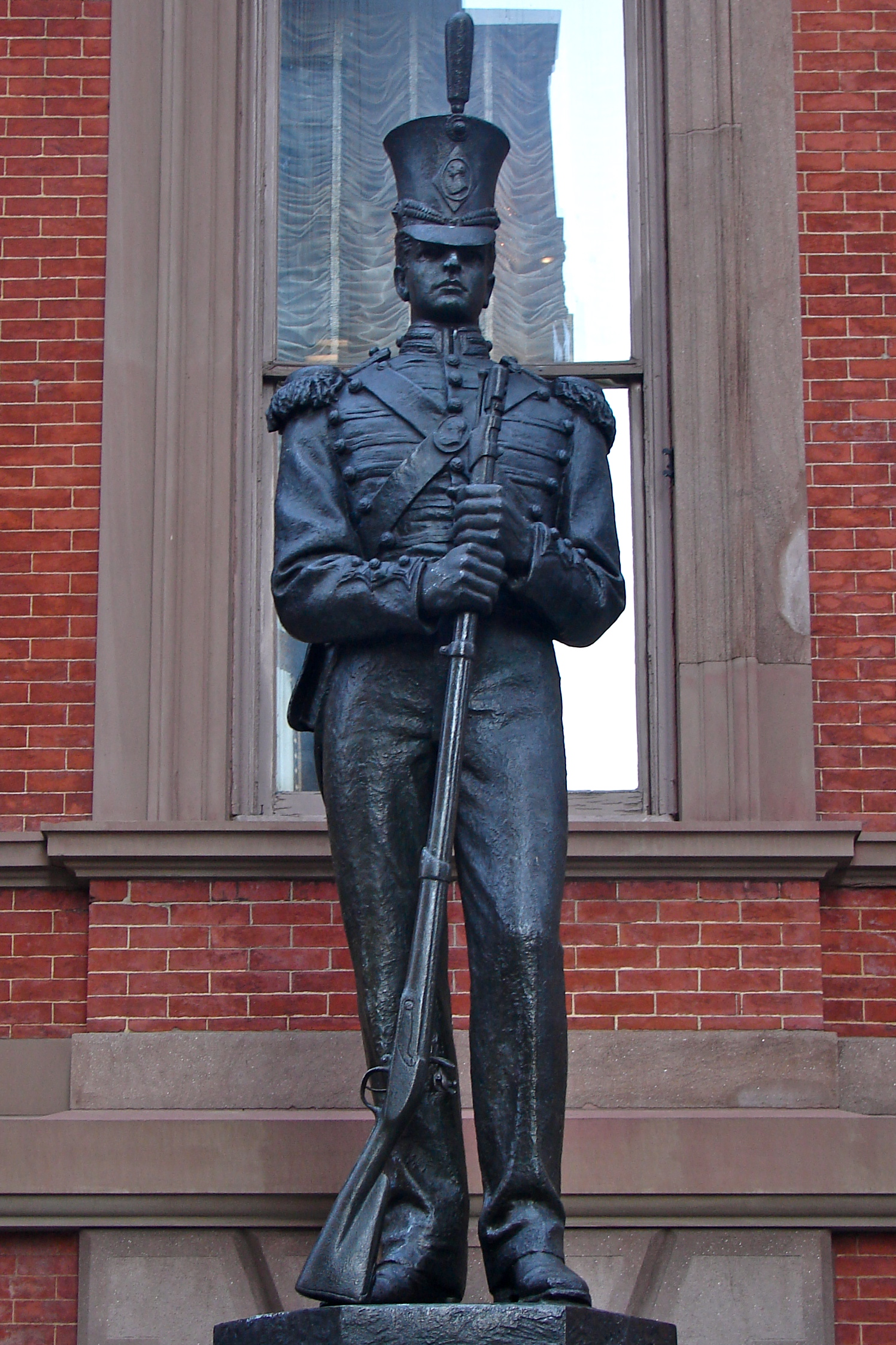
Washington Grays Monument in front of the Union League of Philadelphia, honoring the Civil War service of the Washington Grays

Pennsylvania was a critical source of raw materials to the Union's war effort, particularly anthracite coal. The Commonwealth supplied all of this "smokeless" coal for the military's purposes, as well as the majority of bituminous coal also used in the war effort. Nearly 80% of all the iron for the government came from Pennsylvania foundries, as well as significant quantities of flour, meat, foodstuffs, textiles, and uniforms. The Cumberland Valley was among the fertile farming regions that supplied vast amounts of food and grain to the Army. The railroads became critical in transporting materiel and troops. In particular, the Baltimore and Ohio Railroad and the Pennsylvania Railroad were of importance, as well as the Northern Central Railway, which led from Harrisburg to Baltimore, Maryland, and Washington, D.C.

The Bethlehem Iron Works produced railroad rails and armor plating for the U.S. Navy's ships. The largest producer of wrought iron artillery pieces for the Union army was the Phoenixville Iron Company in Chester County, which, at its peak, churned out fifty 3" Ordnance Rifles each week. Smaller facilities produced steel swords, rifles, pistols, tools, camp implements, tents, and other items used by the Federal armies, making Pennsylvania one of the most important sources of government supplies during the war.

The Philadelphia region was a significant contributor to the war effort. The Frankford Arsenal was a vital source of small-arms, ammunition, artillery shells, and time fuses to the Federal Army and state militia. The Philadelphia Navy Yard provided an important source of ships, sailors, and supplies for the United States Navy during the war. The vast majority of the coal used by the Navy for its warships and blockaders came from underground mines in several counties in northern Pennsylvania. The Satterlee Hospital and the Mower Hospital (both near Philadelphia) were significant military hospitals and rehabilitation centers, as was the York U.S. Army General Hospital.

On the other side of the state, Pittsburgh's heavy industry provided significant quantities of weapons and ammunition. The Fort Pitt Works near Pittsburgh made mammoth iron castings for giant siege howitzers and mortars, among the largest guns in the world. The foundry produced 1,193 guns (15 percent of the total U.S. wartime artillery production) and almost 200,000 artillery projectiles. Other prominent Pittsburgh area factories included Singer, Nimick, and Co. (maker of 3" Ordnance rifles) and Smith, Park, and Co., which produced more than 300,000 artillery projectiles. Pittsburgh industries collectively manufactured 10 percent of the total U.S. wartime production of artillery projectiles.

The U.S. Allegheny Arsenal was the primary military manufacturing facility for U.S. Army accouterments, as well as saddles and other cavalry equipment. In addition, the Allegheny Arsenal produced as many as 40,000 bullets and cartridges every day (more than 14 million per year), supplying between 5 and 10 percent of the Army's annual small arms ammunition requirements.

Five Ellet-class rams were converted from civilian towboats at Pittsburgh. In addition, four ironclads were built from the keel up: the USS Manayunk, Marietta, Sandusky, and Umpqua. Pittsburgh rolling mills supplied the armor for many of the ironclads that were built in New York and Philadelphia.

== Military actions in Pennsylvania ==
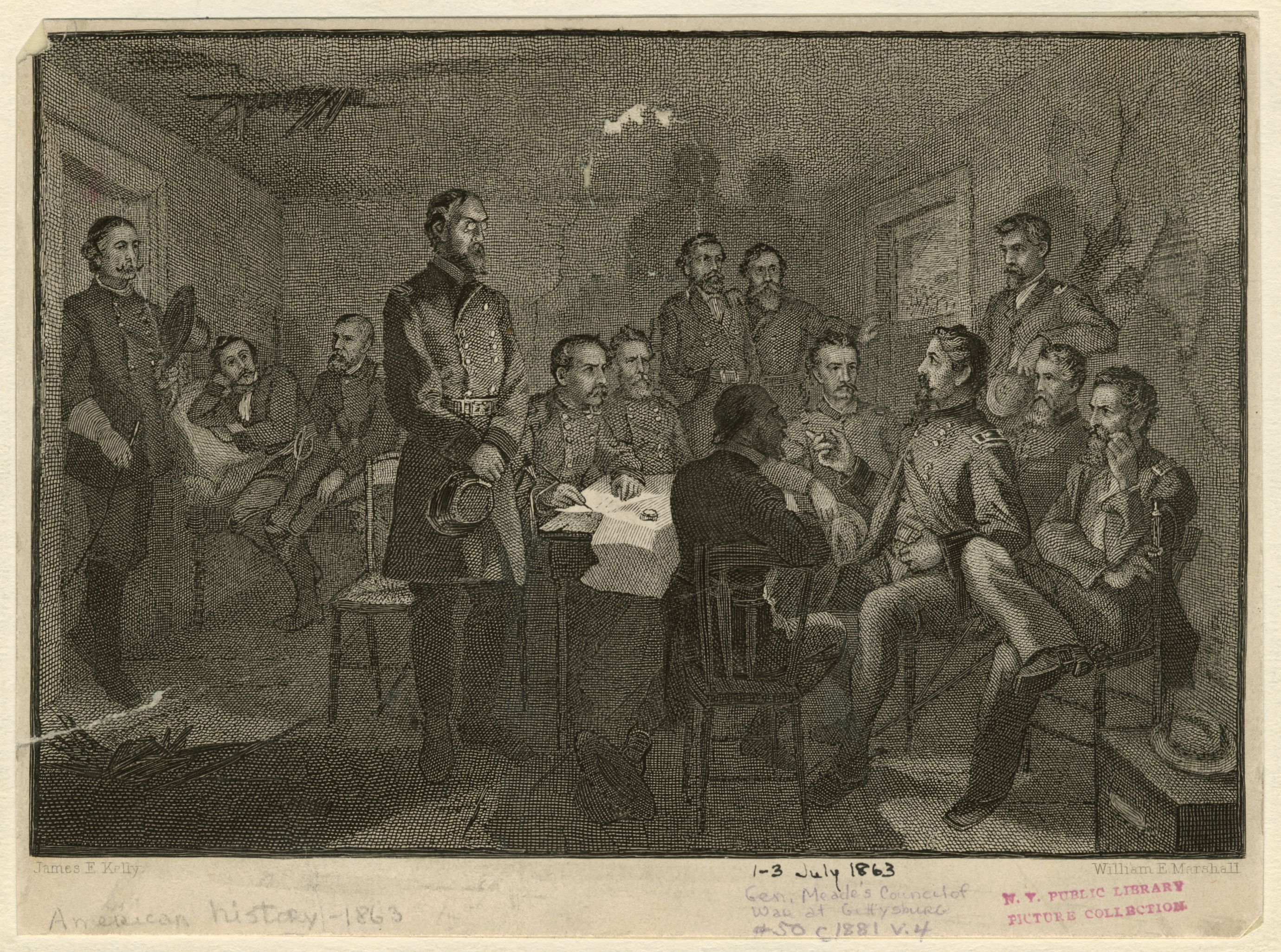
George Meade and the Council of War at Gettysburg on July 2, 1863, depicted in an engraving by James E. Kelly

As a result of its vital role as a Federal raw material source and its proximity to the Mason–Dixon line, Pennsylvania was the target of several raids by the Confederate States Army. These included cavalry raids in 1862 and 1863 by J.E.B. Stuart, in 1863 by John Imboden, and in 1864 by John McCausland in which his troopers burned the city of Chambersburg. Fears were raised in Pittsburgh in the summer of 1863 when Morgan's Raid approached Pennsylvania before it was thwarted in neighboring Ohio.

Pennsylvania also saw the Battle of Gettysburg, near Gettysburg. Many historians consider this battle to be a major turning point of the Civil War. Federal dead from this battle rest at Gettysburg National Cemetery, site of Abraham Lincoln's Gettysburg Address. Several smaller engagements were also fought in Pennsylvania, including the Battle of Hanover, Battle of Carlisle, Battle of Hunterstown, and the Battle of Fairfield, all during the Gettysburg campaign. The city of York, Pennsylvania became the largest Northern city to be occupied by Confederate troops when Jubal A. Early's division took control of the town in late June 1863 and extracted a ransom.

== War politics ==
During the 1860 Presidential Election, Pennsylvania voted in favor of Abraham Lincoln (268,030 votes or 56.3% of the ballots cast) over Stephen Douglas (178,765; 37.5%), John C. Breckinridge (16,765; 3.5%), and John Bell (12,776; 2.7%).

Throughout the war, Republicans dominated Pennsylvania politics under the capable leadership of Governor Andrew G. Curtin, a strong supporter of President Lincoln. The extreme southern tier of the state included a fair number of Copperheads, particularly in Fulton, Adams, and York counties.

On the national level, Simon Cameron served as Secretary of War during the early years of Lincoln's administration. Congressman Thaddeus Stevens became one of the leading voices of the Radical Republicans in Washington. He was hawkish toward both the war efforts and his harsh views on Reconstruction. Stevens' Caledonia Iron Works were burned by Jubal A. Early's Confederates during the Gettysburg Campaign in direct response to his strong stance supporting scorched earth policies in the South.

One Pennsylvanian soldier spoke to a Confederate slave woman whose husband was whipped and was appalled by what she had to tell him of slavery. He stated that "I thought I had hated slavery as much as possible before I came here, but here, where I can see some of its workings, I am more than ever convinced of the cruelty and inhumanity of the system."

After the Battle of Antietam in the fall of 1862, thirteen Union governors assembled in Altoona, Pennsylvania, at the Loyal War Governors' Conference. Governor Andrew G. Curtin assembled this meeting; its purpose was to discuss strategy, troop quotas, and the Union. The governors affirmed their support towards and expressed their concerns regarding the war effort and the emancipation proclamation. They then traveled to Washington, DC, to meet Abraham Lincoln and relay their conclusions. A few weeks later, Lincoln removed General George B. McClellan from commanding the Army of the Potomac (about whom the governors had voiced their displeasure) and issued the Emancipation Proclamation.

By late 1864, the majority of Pennsylvania voters had rallied around the president and supported his incumbency in the Presidential Election, giving Lincoln 296,292 votes or 51.6% of the ballots cast versus Maj. Gen. George B. McClellan's 277,443 votes (48.4%).

== Notable leaders from Pennsylvania ==
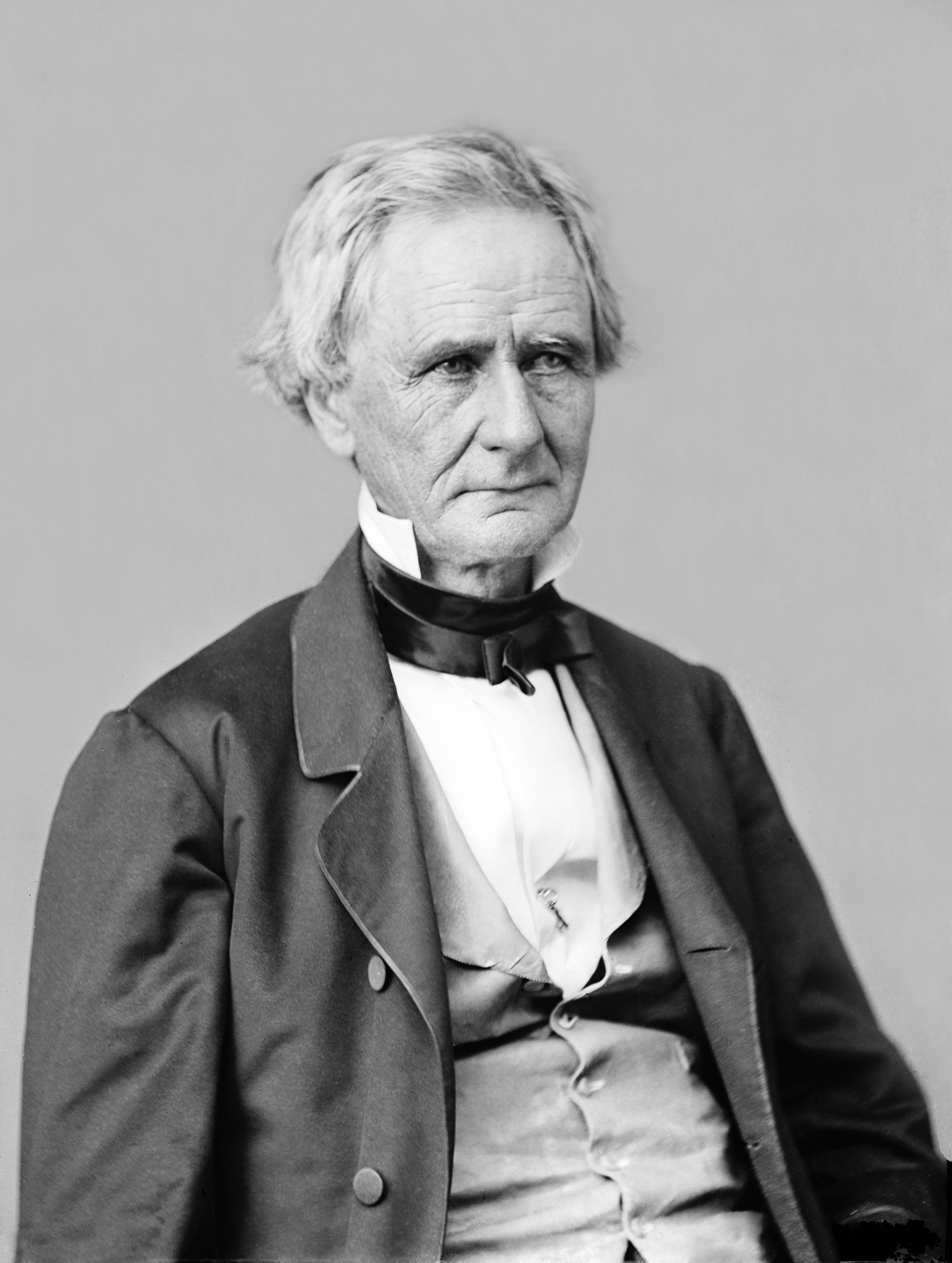
Sec. of War
Simon Cameron

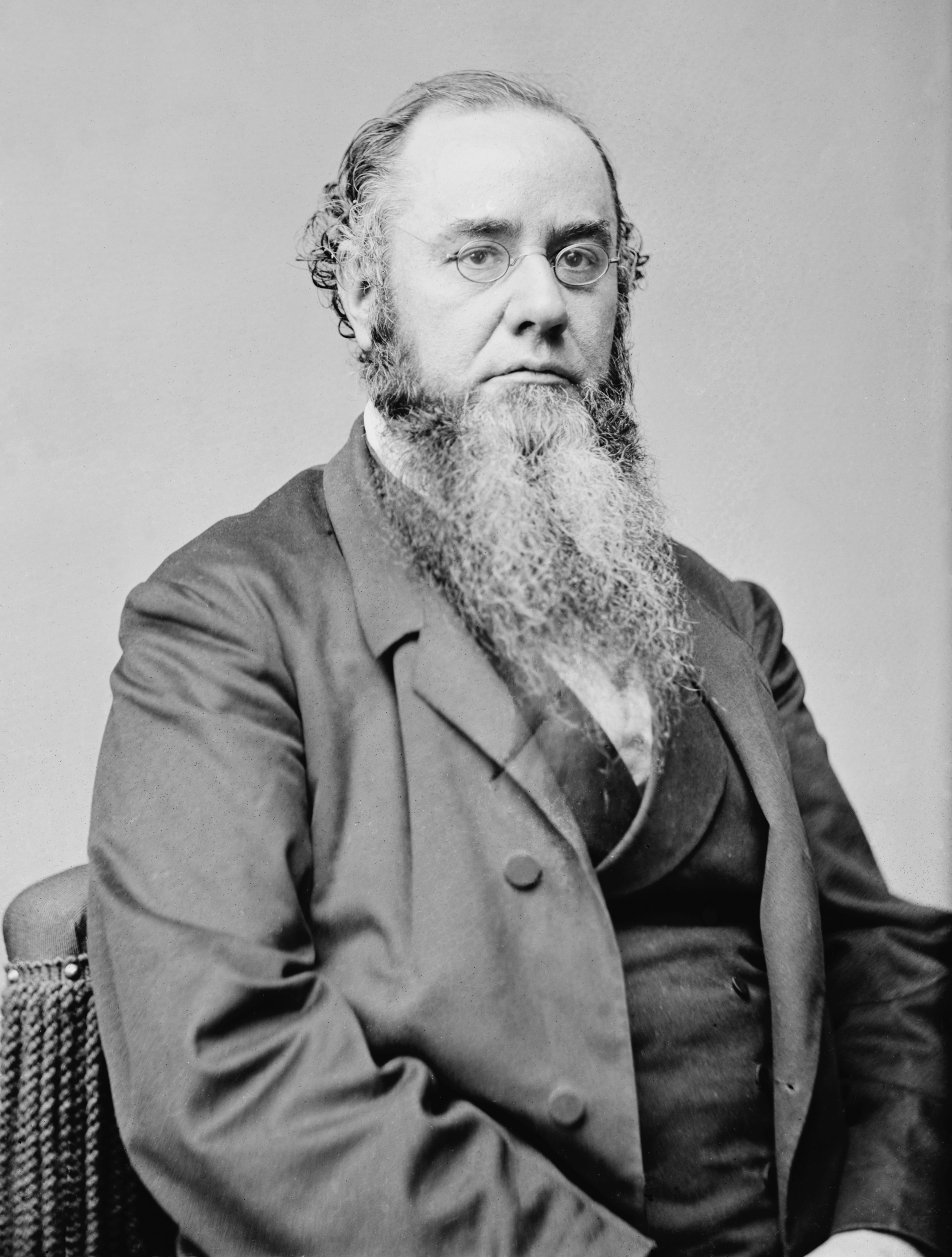
Sec. of War
Edwin Stanton (Note: Also associated with Ohio)

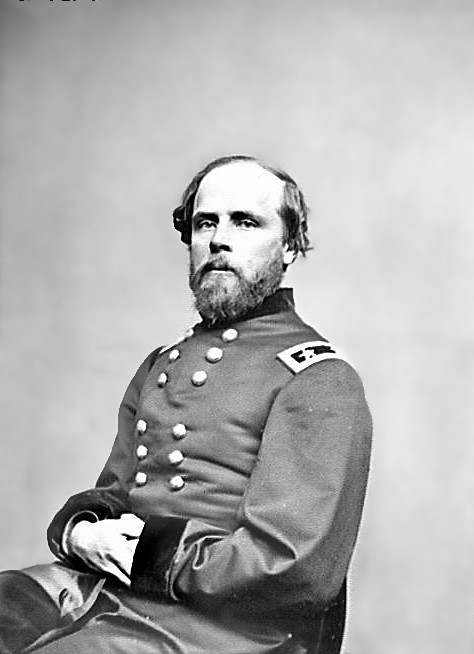
Maj. Gen.
Darius N. Couch

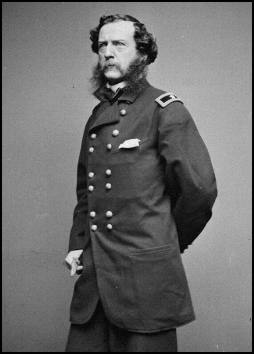
Maj. Gen.
Samuel W. Crawford

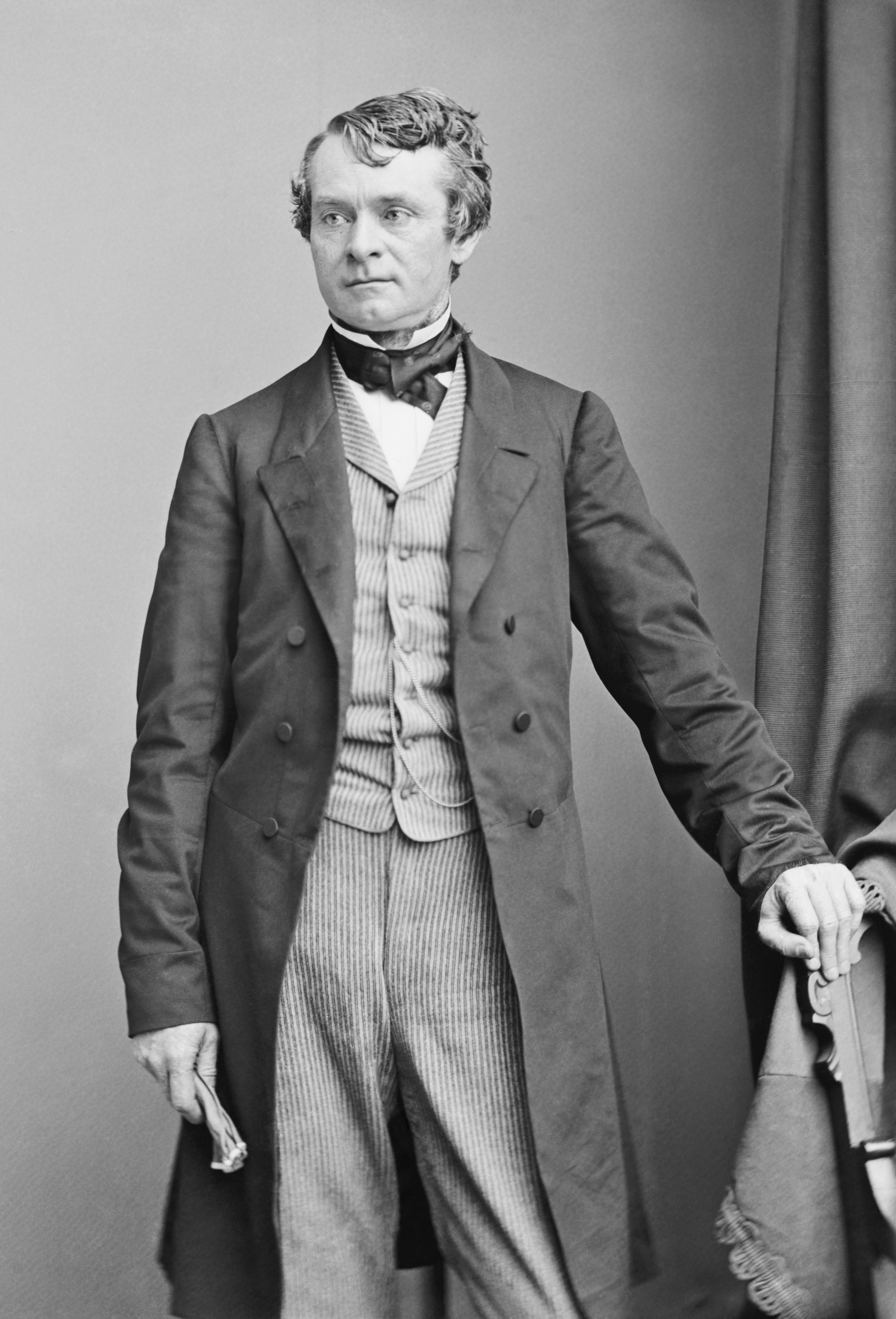
Gov.
Andrew G. Curtin

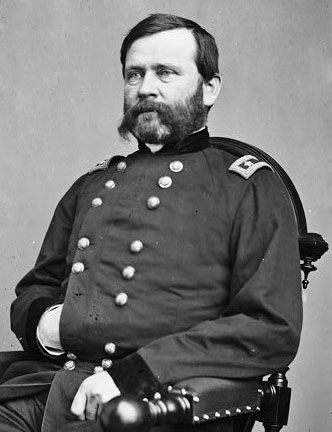
Maj. Gen.
William B. Franklin

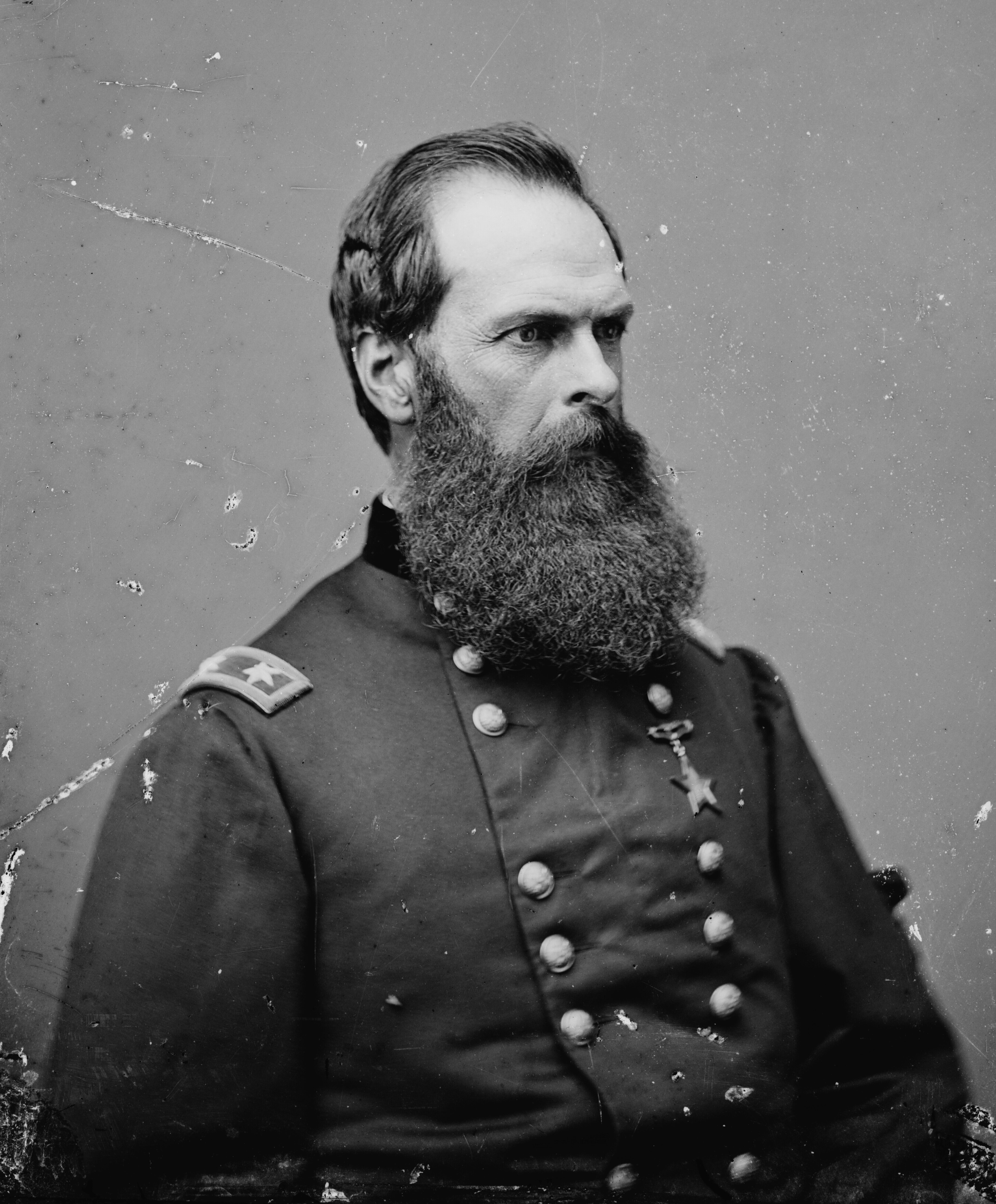
Maj. Gen.
John W. Geary

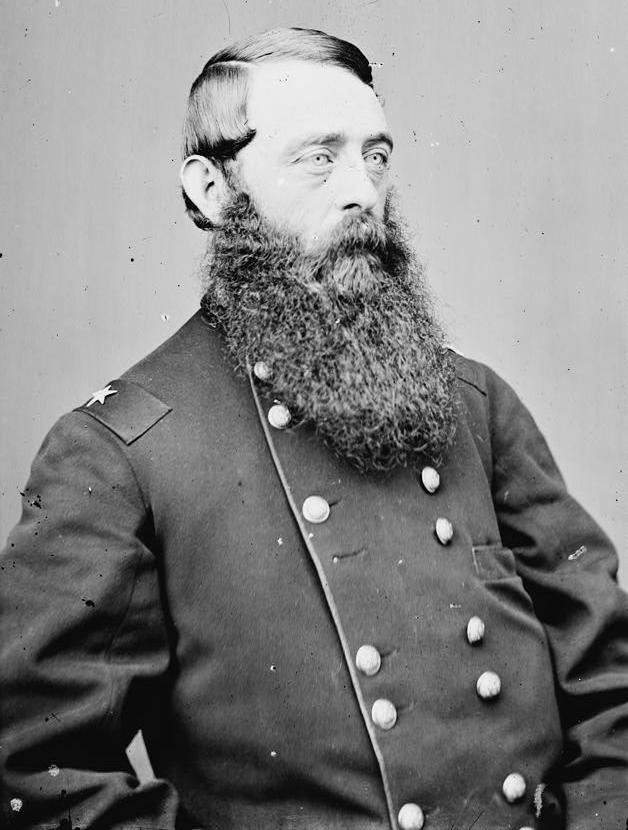
Maj. Gen.
David McM. Gregg

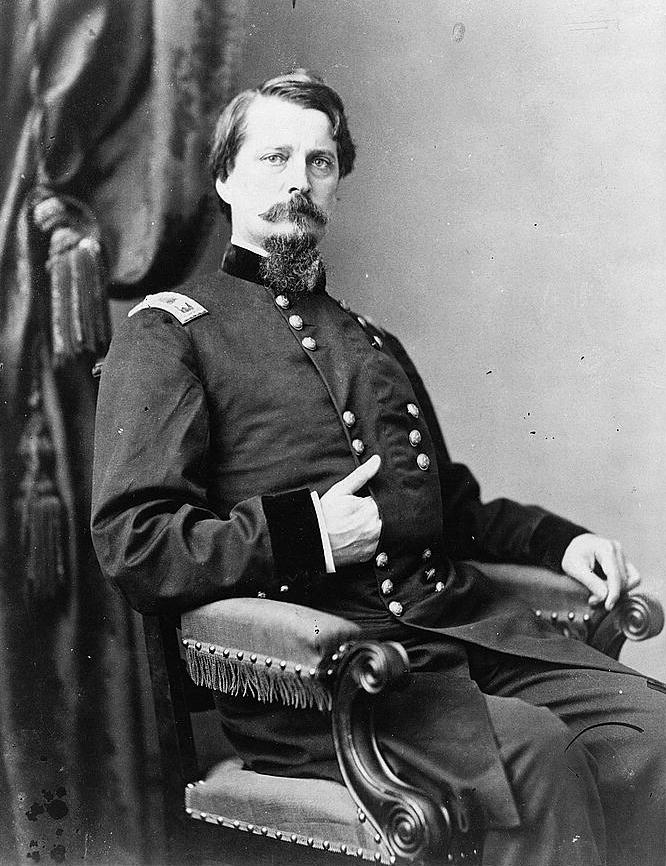
Maj. Gen.
Winfield S. Hancock

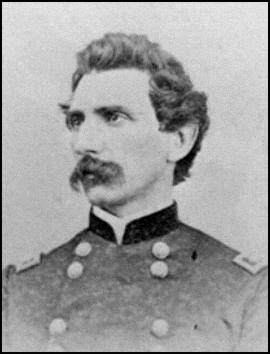
Maj. Gen.
John F. Hartranft

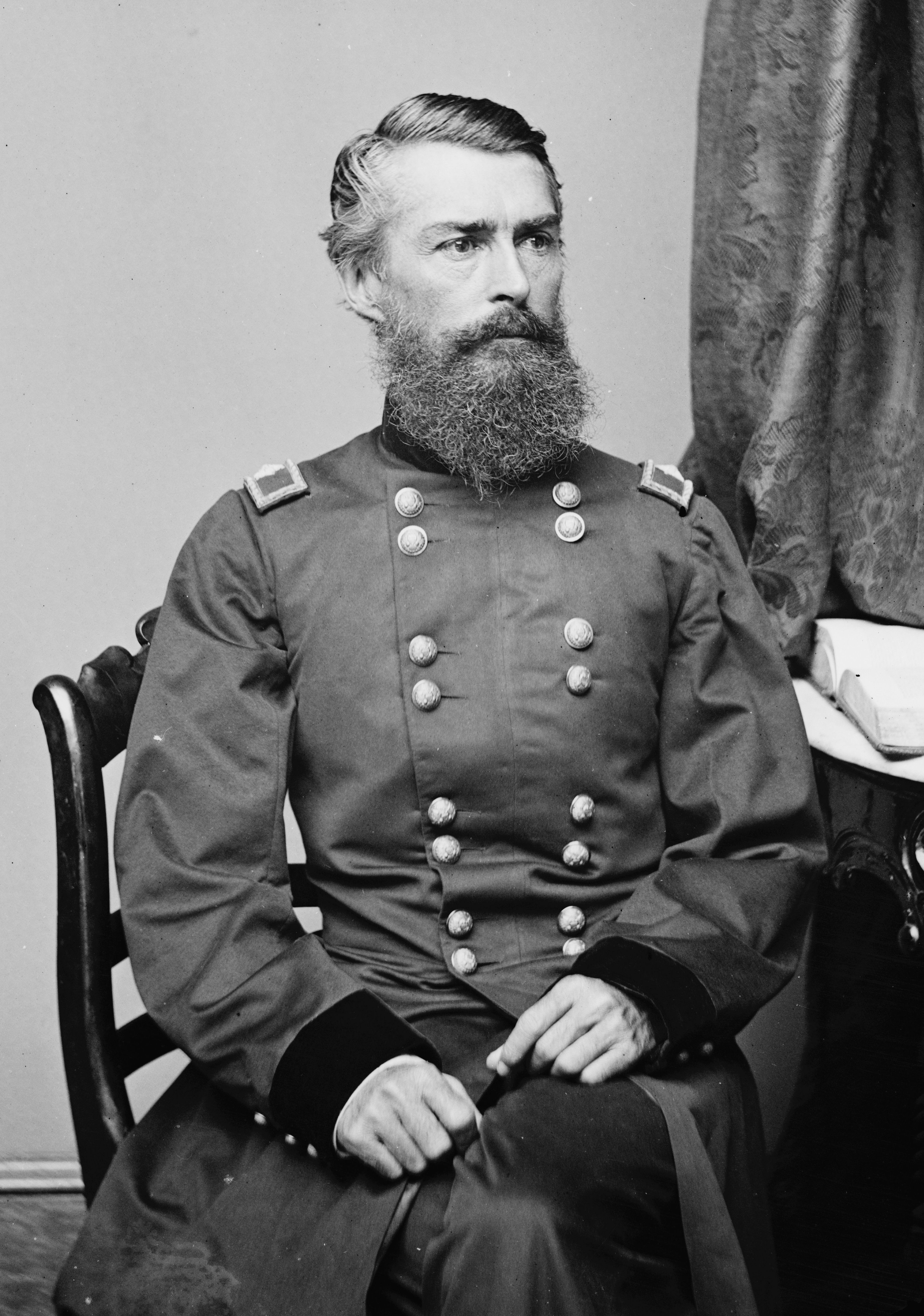
Maj. Gen.
Herman Haupt

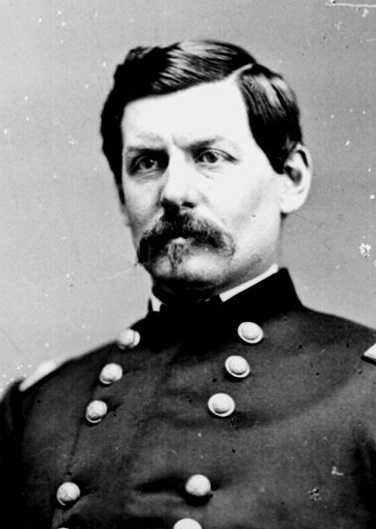
Maj. Gen.
George B. McClellan (Note: Also associated with New Jersey)

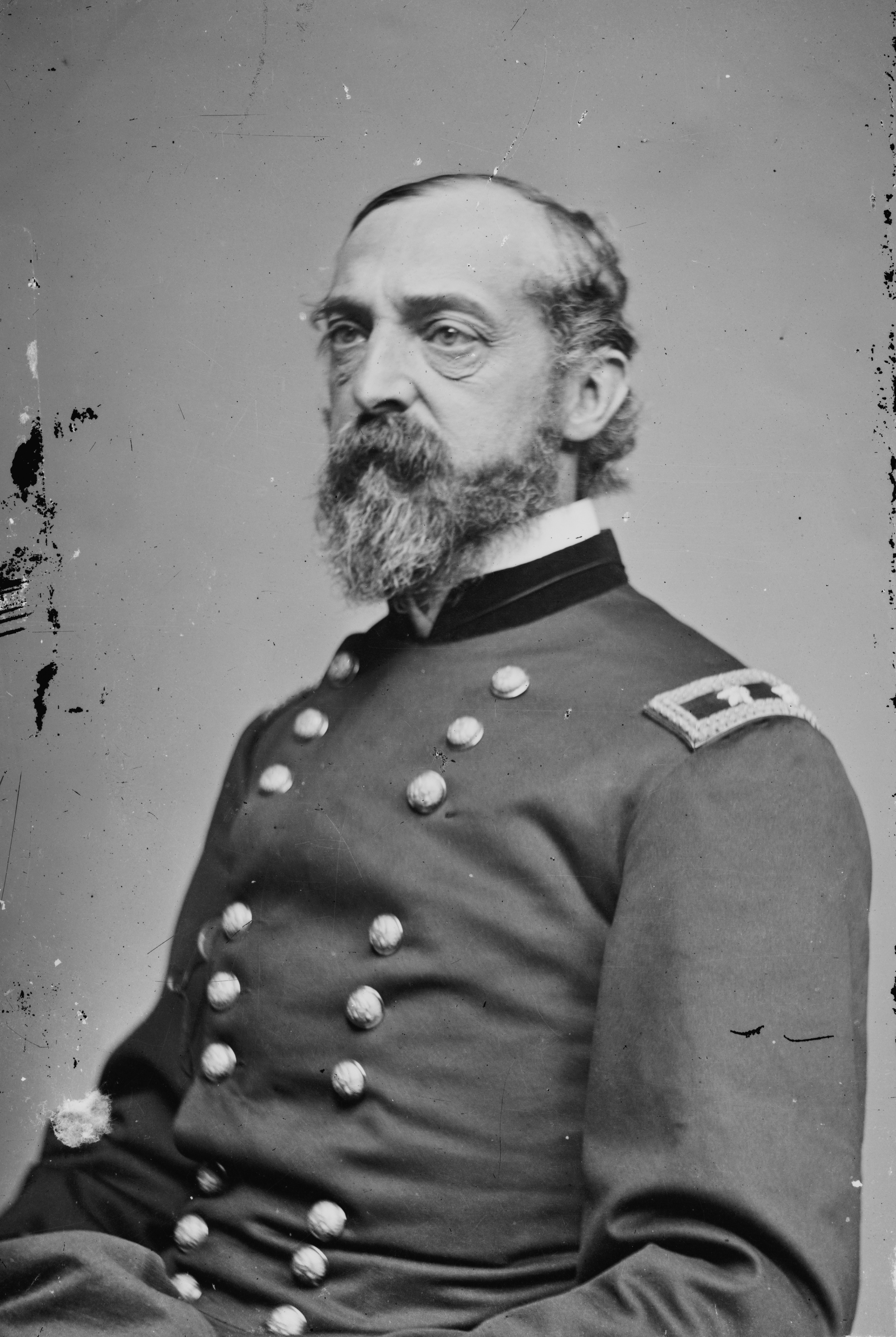
Maj. Gen.
George G. Meade

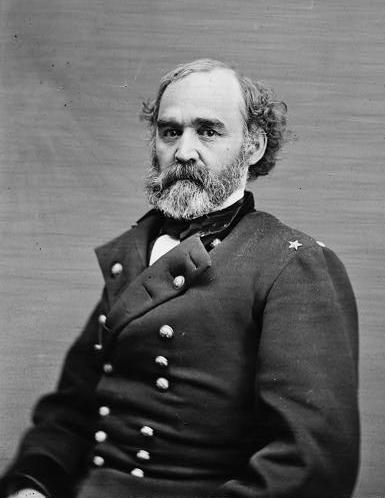
Qtrmaster. Gen.
Montgomery C. Meigs (Note: Also associated with Georgia)

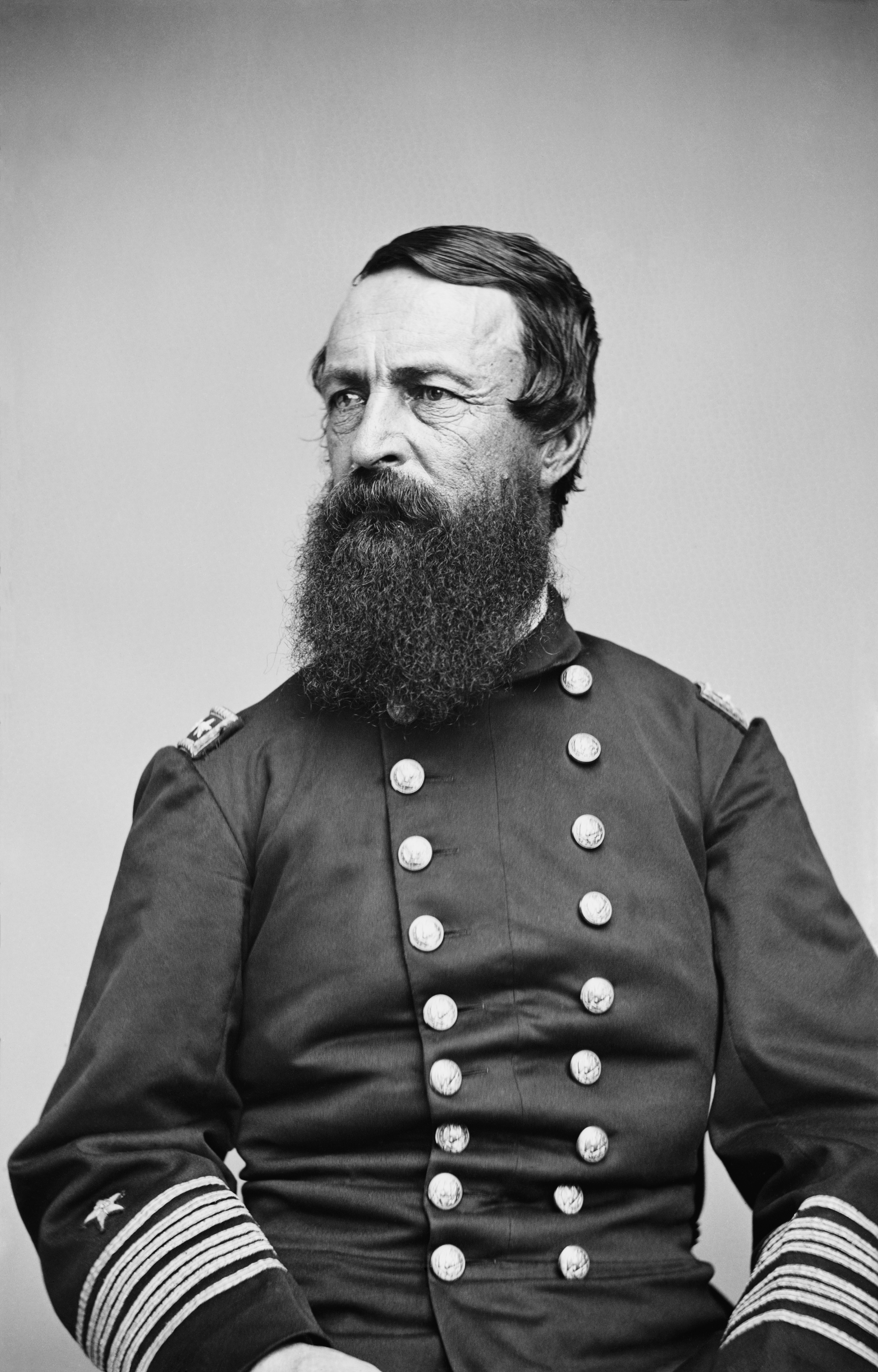
Adm.
David Dixon Porter

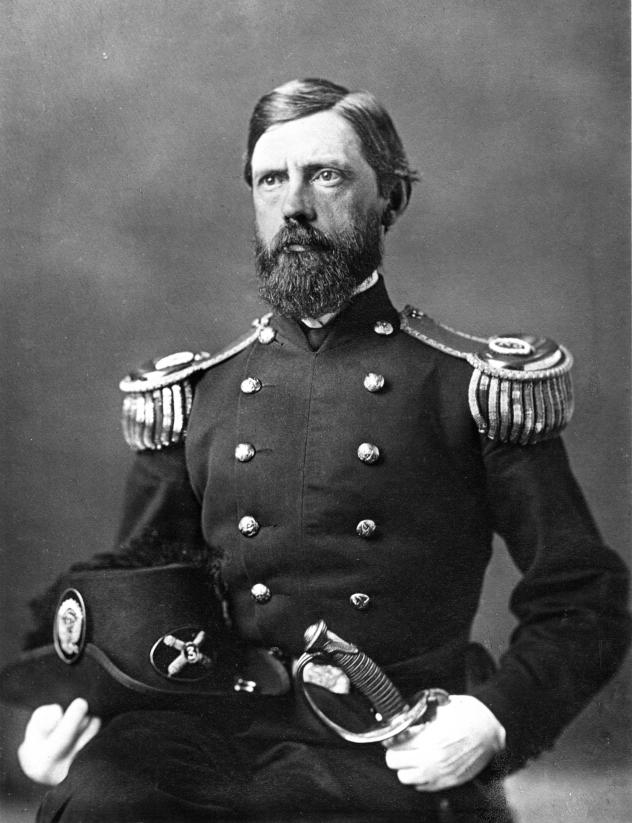
Maj. Gen.
John F. Reynolds

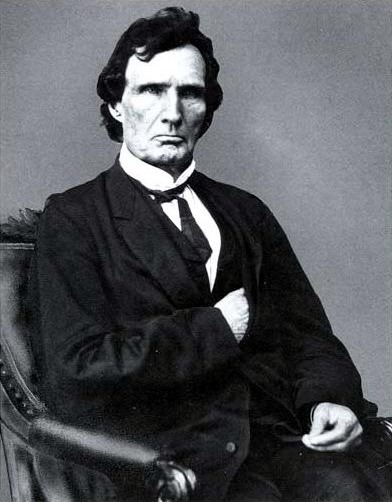
Rep.
Thaddeus Stevens

== Preservation and memorialization ==
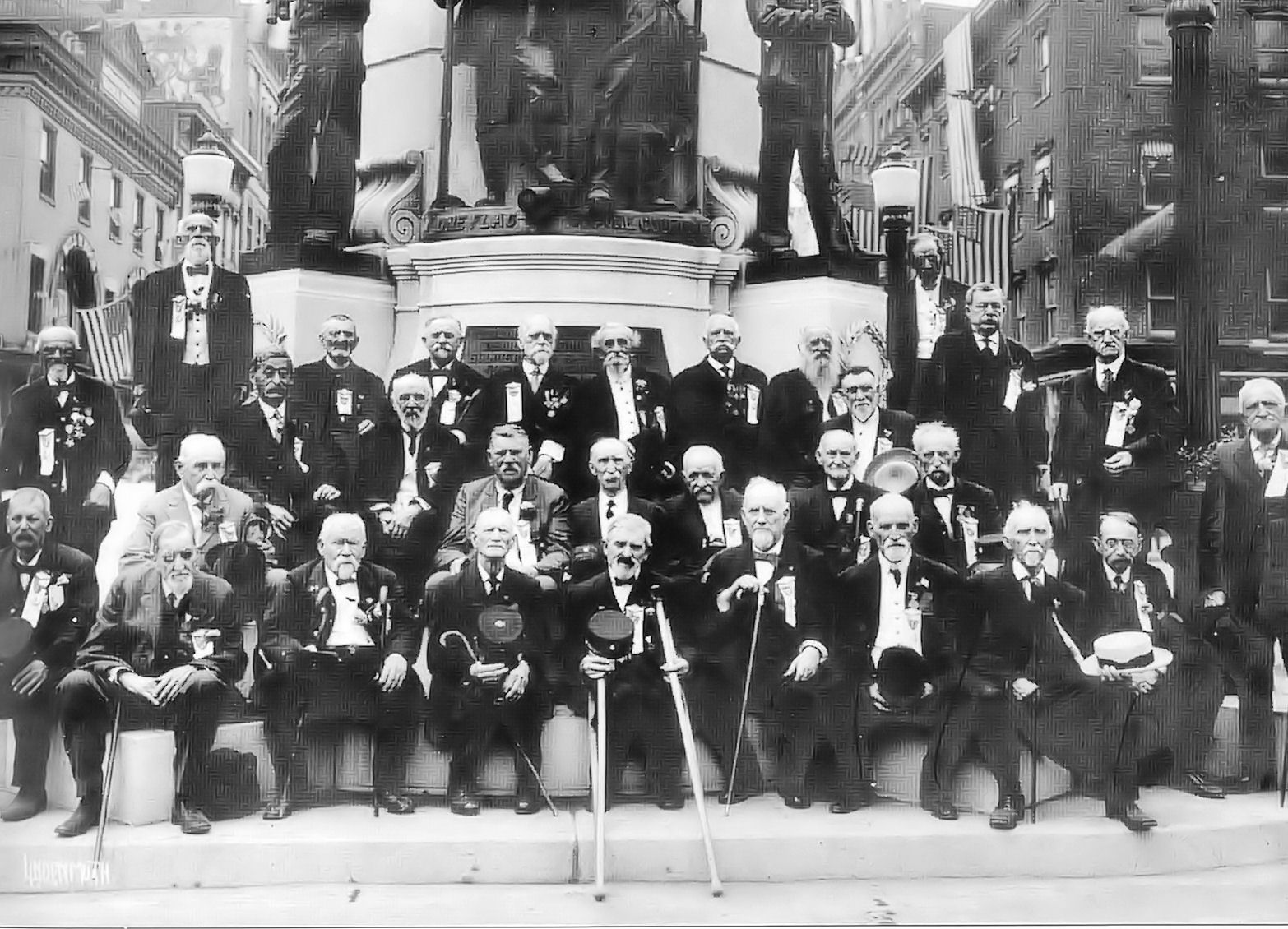
The 50th reunion of Allentown's First Defenders, a Union army unit during the Civil War, 1911

While the war still raged, efforts were underway in Gettysburg to preserve portions of the battlefield for future generations to tribute those men who fought there. Pennsylvania also took steps to preserve and record the history of each regiment and unit raised in the state, as well as the muster rolls. In 1869, the official commonwealth historian Samuel Penniman Bates wrote the monumental five-volume History of the Pennsylvania Volunteers, 1861-1865 which remains the standard reference for the Commonwealth's regimental histories and unit rosters.

The State Archives in Harrisburg preserves the military records of the state's emergency militia, as well as material on the state's volunteer regiments and batteries. It also houses microfilmed records of the damage claims from individuals in several counties, delineating losses of their personal property and possessions to the opposing armies during the Gettysburg Campaign. The Pennsylvania Capitol Preservation Committee maintains and preserves just under 400 of Pennsylvania's historic Civil War battle flags The State Museum of Pennsylvania houses an extensive general collection of Civil War artifacts, as well as Peter Rothermel's massive painting of the Battle of Gettysburg.

The National Civil War Museum in Harrisburg is one of the country's leading interpretive sites for the Civil War. The Visitors Center at the Gettysburg Battlefield holds thousands of artifacts, including the most extensive collection of vintage Civil War weapons in Pennsylvania. Other Civil War-related museums are scattered throughout the state, as well as county archives and hundreds of memorials/monuments/historical markers. An impressive state-sponsored monument in the Gettysburg National Military Park honors Pennsylvania's soldiers and leaders.

== See also ==
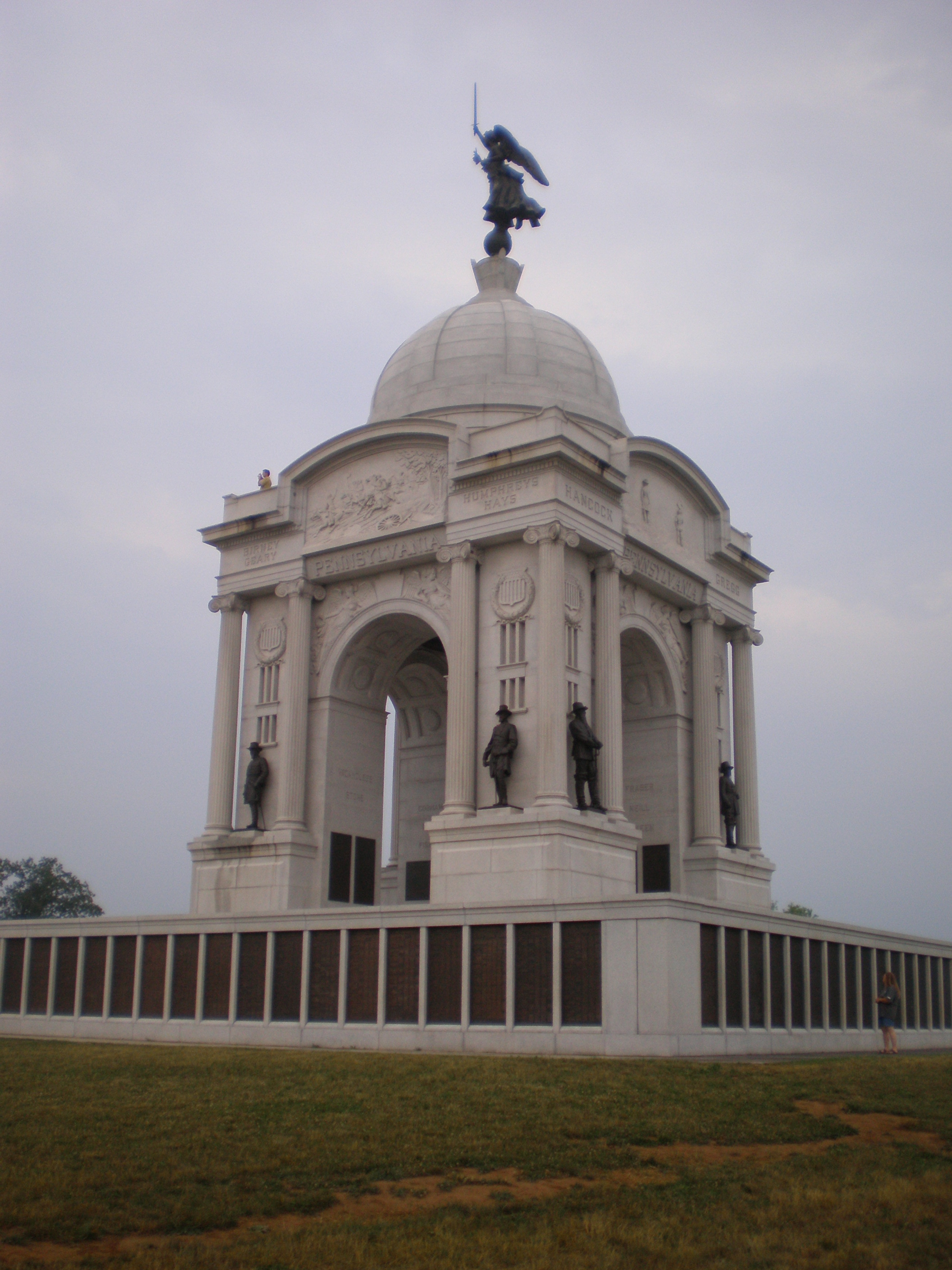
The Pennsylvania Monument honoring Pennsylvania's contribution to the Union Army at Gettysburg National Military Park

- Harrisburg, Pennsylvania, in the American Civil War
- Pittsburgh in the American Civil War
- Philadelphia in the American Civil War
- Civil War Museum of Philadelphia
- Department of the Monongahela
- Department of the Susquehanna
- List of Pennsylvania Civil War regiments
