= Mary Gonzaga =

Mary Gonzaga may refer to:

- Mary Gonzaga Barry (1834–1915), Irish-born Australian Roman Catholic nun
- Mary Gonzaga Grace (1812–1897), American religious sister and nurse
- Mary Gonzaga Leahy (1870–1958), New Zealand Roman Catholic nun and nurse

== See also ==
- Maria Gonzaga (disambiguation)
