= Maria Gonzaga =

Maria Gonzaga may refer to:

- Maria Gonzaga, Duchess of Montferrat
- Marie Louise Gonzaga, Queen of Poland and Grand Duchess of Lithuania

== See also ==
- Mary Gonzaga (disambiguation)
