= Mower General Hospital =

American military hospital

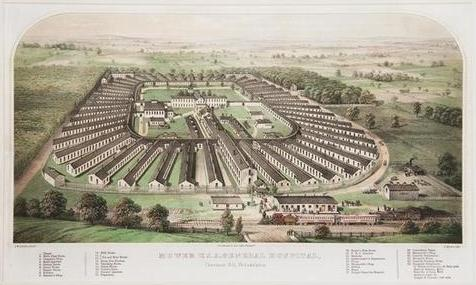
- Mower General Hospital, Chestnut Hill, Philadelphia, Pennsylvania, c. 1864

Site information
- Controlled by: Union Army

Site history
- Built: 1862
- Built by: John McArthur Jr. (designer)
- In use: January 1863 through May 1865
- Battles/wars: American Civil War

Mower General Hospital was one of the largest Federal military hospitals during the American Civil War. Located across from the Reading Railroad depot in the Chestnut Hill section of Philadelphia, it operated from January 1863 through May 1865, and was closed with the cessation of the war.

== History ==
Built in 1862, the Mower General Hospital complex was designed by architect John McArthur Jr., and named in honor of Thomas Mower, a surgeon who served with the U.S. Army's 6th Infantry during the Blackhawk War and under U.S. Surgeon General Thomas Lawson during the Second Seminole War.

Constructed on 27 acres (11 ha) between Willow Grove and Springfield Avenues, the Reading Railroad line and Stenton Avenue, the hospital complex was configured as a central compound surrounded by a ring of 47 radiating wards and other buildings, and had a 3,600-bed capacity. Its first commanding officer was Andrew Hopkins, M.D., a surgeon who later contracted and died from typhoid fever. Of the roughly 20,000 patients who passed through this facility from the time of its opening on January 3, 1863 until its closure on May 31, 1865, 9,799 survived their respective treatments and were returned to duty and 878 were transferred to the Veteran Reserve Corps (also known as the "Invalid Corps). Another 1,363 were discharged on surgeons' certificates of disability and an additional 3,718 were transferred to other facilities for further care while 1,508 were recorded as having deserted. Despite the grievous wounds and serious illnesses treated here, hospital physicians lost just 257 patients total by war's end.

The hospital featured many amenities for the patients and staff, including plumbing to provide hot water, special medical wards that could be isolated for patients with infections, centralized storage for supplies, flush toilets, band music, etc.

In addition, while many medicines provided for the treatment of soldiers were provided by regular military supply routes, hospital stewards at Mower also operated a small laboratory on the hospital's grounds in which "they prepared tinctures in quantities varying from one-half gallon to ten gallons, and also fluid extracts." These tinctures, as well as "most of the syrups, cerates, ointments, wines and waters of the Pharmacopoeia" were produced in this 14-foot by 16-foot stone building, which was "ventilated only by an open skylight, using just "a large-sized cooking stove, and some of the more ordinary apparatus," but no percolator. Consequently, the efficacy of some of their products was questionable since the stewards did not have the "proper means for the nice regulation of heat" which would normally be used in the evaporation process.

The wounded were brought directly from Southern battlefields by railroad—a journey known as "going from the seven circles of hell to heaven."

== Photographic history ==
In 1862, Philadelphia photographer John Moran created, published, and sold a series of albumen print photographs of the hospital. Moran's photos were issued as both mounted photographs and stereographs soon after the facility was completed. Moran's exterior and interior views included photos of the special medical wards that could be isolated for patients with infections and then novel centralized storage facilities for supplies.

== Location ==
The hospital, a major military facility, was built in 1862 on a lot of 27 acres, situated between Stenton, Germantown, Springfield, and Abington avenues in Philadelphia's Chestnut Hill. Wyndmoor station, Market Square Shopping Center, apartment buildings, and townhouses now occupy the site.

== See also ==
- List of former United States Army medical units
- Satterlee General Hospital, Philadelphia, Pennsylvania
