= Satterlee General Hospital =

Hospital in Pennsylvania, United States

Coordinates: 39°56′57″N 75°12′40″W

- Forty-fourth Street and Baltimore Avenue, Philadelphia, Pennsylvania
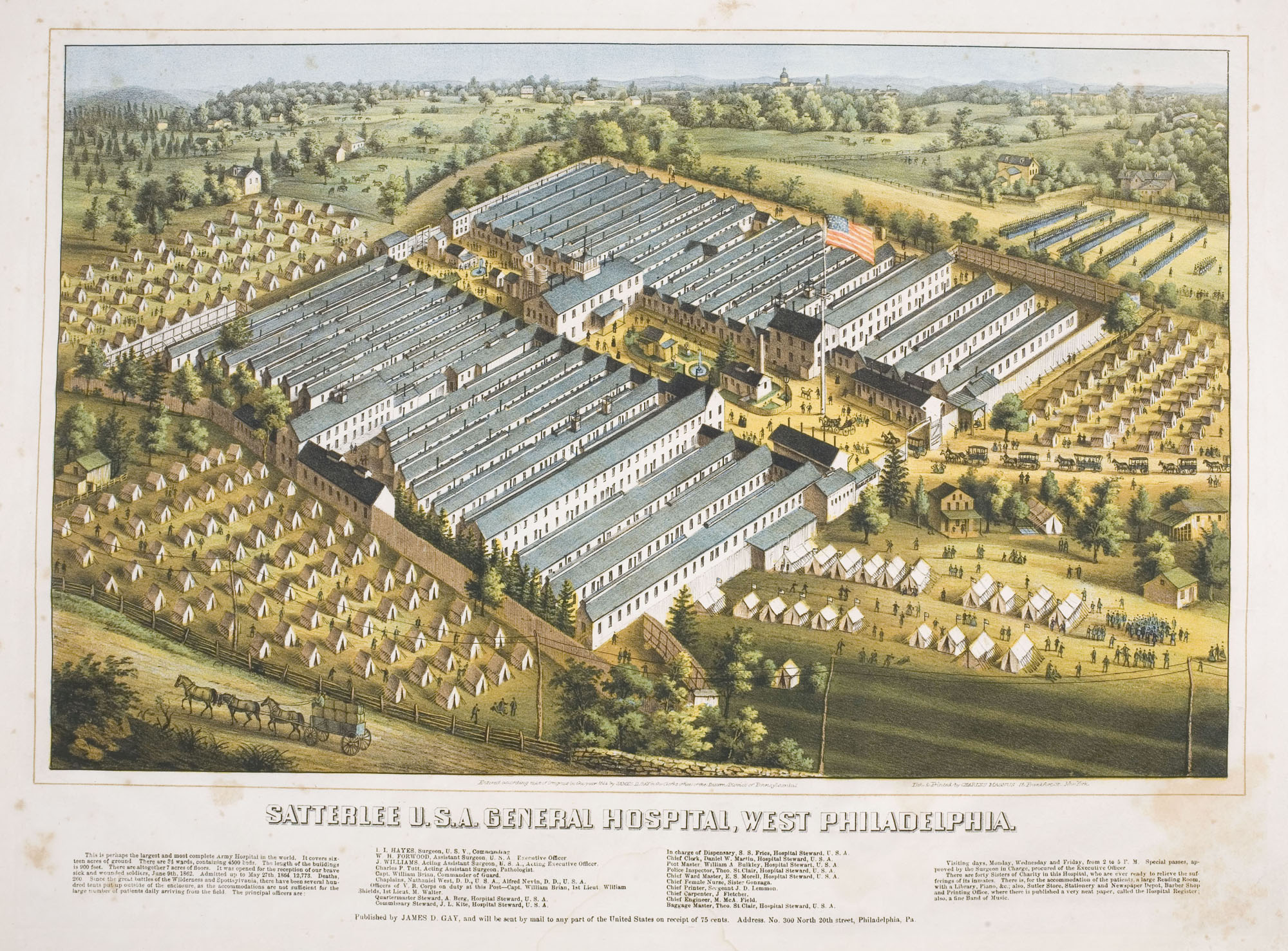
- 1864 illustration

Site information
- Controlled by: Union Army

Site history
- Built: 1862
- In use: 1862–1865
- Demolished: 1865 (officially closed on August 3, 1865)
- Battles/wars: American Civil War

Satterlee General Hospital was the largest Union Army hospital during the American Civil War. Operating from 1862 to 1865 in Philadelphia, Pennsylvania, its physicians and nurses rendered care to thousands of Union soldiers and Confederate prisoners. After its patient population spiked following the battles of Bull Run and Gettysburg, this hospital became the second-largest in the country with 34 wards and hundreds of tents containing 4,500 beds.

Initially referred to as the West Philadelphia General Hospital, it was later renamed in honor of Richard Sherwood Satterlee, a physician from Seneca County, New York, who was stationed with the United States Army at Fort Winnebago in Portage, Wisconsin, during the Black Hawk War, and then rose to prominence and was brevetted as a lieutenant colonel, colonel, and brigadier general during America's Civil War "for diligent care and attention in procuring proper army supplies, as Medical Purveyor, and for economy and fidelity in the disbursement of large sums of money."

== History ==
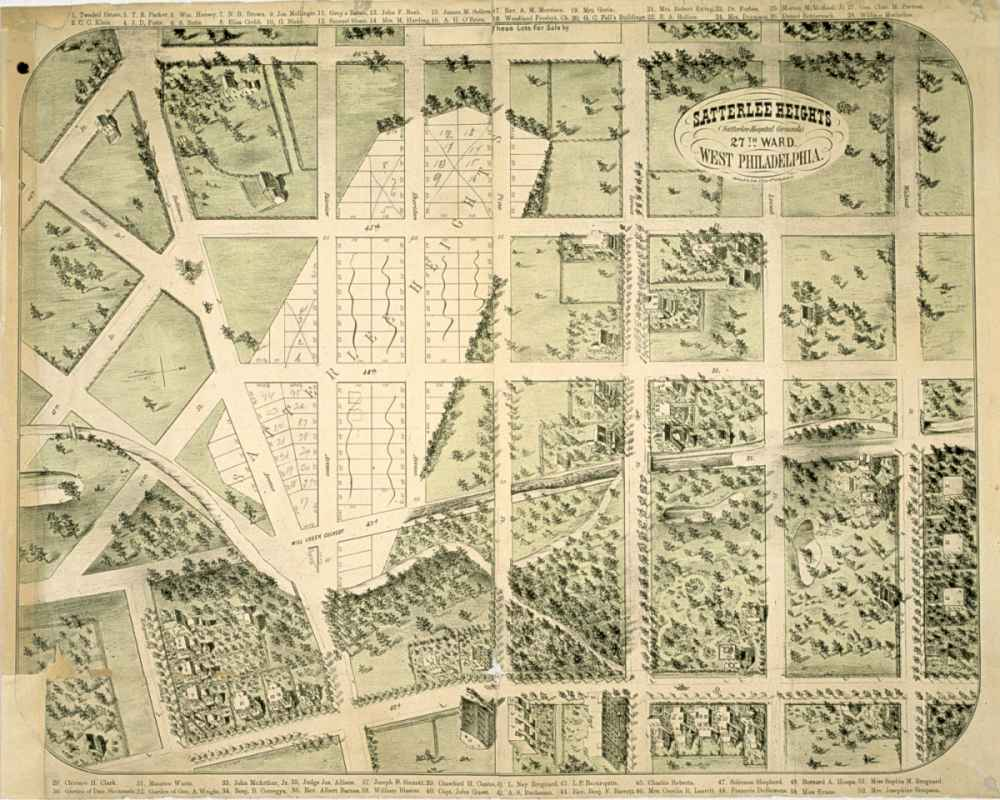
Existing and proposed land use, former Satterlee hospital site, 1869.

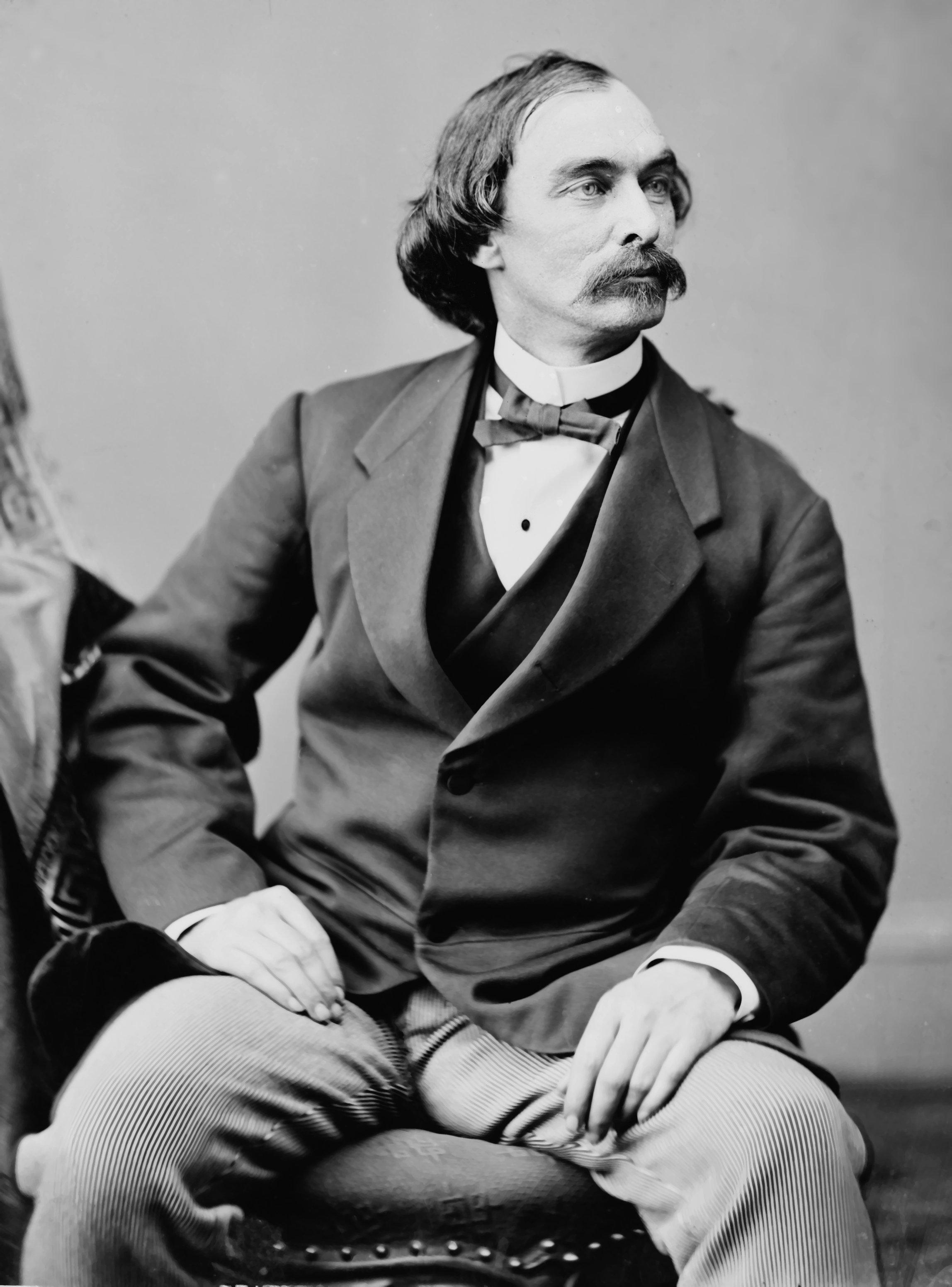
Isaac Israel Hayes, c. 1860–1875.

Founded in 1862 by order of Surgeon-General William Alexander Hammond, the hospital was built in the sparsely developed neighborhood of West Philadelphia near the intersection of 42nd Street and Baltimore Avenue on 15-acre (6.1 ha) grounds which ran north to 45th and Pine Streets. The initial 2,500-bed facility was built in just 40 days.

Nursing duties at Satterlee were performed by members of the Daughters of Charity, who began their work before the facility was finished or fully equipped. The hospital's "chapel was so small," according to historians at the Catholic Historical Research Center in Philadelphia, "that some sisters had to exit the room so others could enter and receive Holy Communion." Eating separately from, and earlier than, the military officers who also worked at the hospital, they were given just four of the officers' utensils to share. Ultimately, more than 100 Daughters of Charity worked at the hospital, living in a convent on the grounds, with Sister Mary Gonzaga Grace as their superioress.

The facility's commanding officer was Dr. Isaac Israel Hayes, a native of Chester County, Pennsylvania, and graduate of the Westtown School and the University of Pennsylvania Medical School who had achieved a measure of fame as an Arctic explorer with the Second Grinnell Expedition of 1853-55 and with his own 1860-61 expedition in search of the Open Polar Sea before joining the United States Army as a surgeon.

The hospital's chaplain was the pastor at St. Patrick's church located at 20th and Locust Streets, Father Peter McGrane, who heard confessions and offered mass daily, and also offered assistance with baptisms and burials. "Archbishop James Wood also visited Satterlee several times to confirm many adult converts," the Catholic Historical Research Center historians wrote.

In 1862, the hospital added military tents with beds to handle the influx of hundreds of soldiers wounded in the Second Battle of Bull Run.

The hospital had become a "self-contained city" by 1863. After the Battle of Gettysburg in July of that year, "the greatest number of wounded were admitted to the hospital in a single month...swelling the hospital population to more than 6,000." That August, hospital clerks recorded "the greatest number of deaths in any one month" — an average of more than one a day. Supply needs rose as well: in "just one year, patients consumed more than 800,000 pounds of bread, 16,000 pounds of butter and 334,000 quarts of milk."

By 1864, the hospital was surrounded by a 14-foot tall fence and included a barber shop, carpenter shop, clothing store, dispensary, three kitchens, laundry, library, post office, reading room, and a printing office that printed Satterlee's newspaper, The Hospital Register.

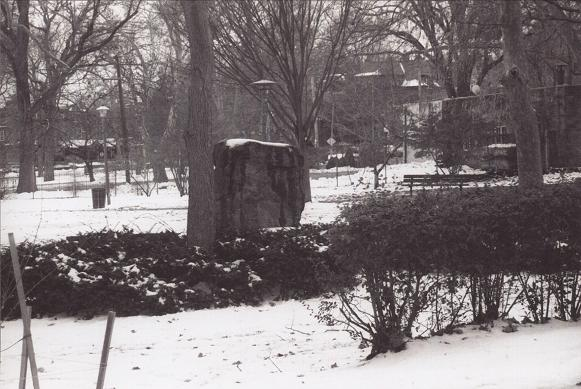
Gettysburg Stone marking the former site of Satterlee General Hospital.

Over the course of the hospital's operation, Satterlee's physicians and nurses treated some 50,000 sick and wounded people, losing only 260, a notable accomplishment considering the sanitary conditions and medical techniques of the day. Sister Ann Alexis Shorb was the head nurse.

Following the Confederate army's Surrender at Appomattox on April 9, 1865, the number of patients sent to Satterlee gradually began to decline, and the hospital was closed on August 3, 1865. The buildings were eventually razed and, during the 1890s, much of the site was then redeveloped with residential housing in what is now Spruce Hill. The lower portion of the hospital grounds survive as Clark Park, where a stone stele memorializes the hospital.

== See also ==
- List of former United States Army medical units
