= Bell Museum =

Bell Museum may refer to:

People

- the Alexander Graham Bell Museum in Baddeck, Cape Breton, Nova Scotia, Canada, part of the Alexander Graham Bell National Historic Site close to the Bell Family estate of Beinn Bhreagh.
- the Bell Homestead Museum, also known as Melville House, part of the Bell Homestead National Historic Site, in Brantford, Ontario, Canada, the Bell family's first home in North America and the location where Alexander Graham Bell invented the telephone in July 1874.

Bells

- the Bast Bell Museum, a bell museum in Germantown, Wisconsin, U.S.A.
- the Bell Museum Grassmayr, a bell foundry museum in Grassmayr, Innsbruck, Tyrol, Austria.
- the Big Bell Temple Ancient Bell Museum, a bell museum at Big Bell Temple, Haidian District, Beijing, People's Republic of China.
- the Glockenmuseum Stiftskirche Herrenberg, a bell museum housing the most extensive collection of bells that are still in use in the world, Herrenberg, Baden-Württemberg, Germany
- the Jincheon Bell Museum, a bell museum in Chungcheongbuk-do, Jincheon-gun, Republic of Korea.
- the Shoreham Bell Museum, a bell museum in Shoreham, Vermont, U.S.A.

Historical and educational institutions

- the Bell Museum of Natural History in Minneapolis, Minnesota, U.S.A, on the campus of the University of Minnesota, formerly called the James Ford Bell Museum of Natural History.
- the Liberty Bell Memorial Museum in Melbourne, Florida, U.S.A. which houses military war exhibits, historical documents and a full size replica of the Liberty Bell.
- the Liberty Bell Museum, also called the Liberty Bell Shrine Museum, a museum located in Zion's United Church of Christ in Allentown, Pennsylvania, U.S.A.
- the Meneely Bell Online Museum, an Internet website created at the University of Georgia, in the United States.
- the Mission Bell Museum in the former First Presbyterian Church of Coweta, Oklahoma, U.S.A.
- the Old Bell Museum, a converted 16th century inn, in Montgomery, Powys, Wales, U.K.

Telephones

- the Jefferson Barracks Telephone Museum, a telephone museum in Saint Louis, Missouri, U.S.A.
- the former Bell Telephone Museum of Portland, Oregon, U.S.A., now defunct.
- the Pacific Bell Telephone Museum, a telephone museum in San Francisco, California, U.S.A.
