= John Jacob Mickley =

John Jacob Mickley may refer to:

- John Jacob Mickley (soldier), farmer and soldier, known for transporting the Liberty Bell during the American Revolutionary War
- John Jacob Mickley (settler), his father, early settler in Pennsylvania
