= John Jacob Mickley (settler) =

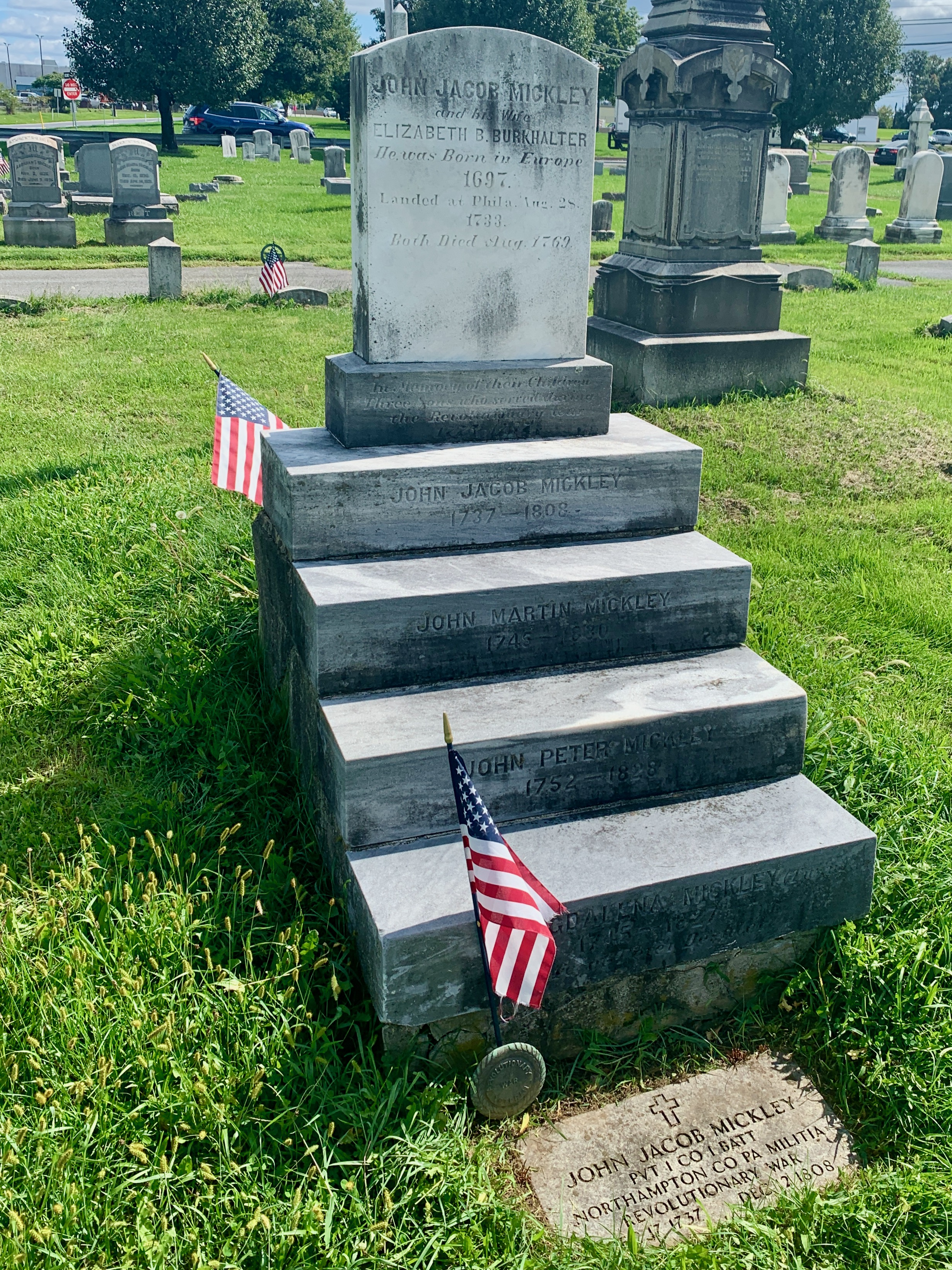
- The Mickley family memorial in Mickleys, Pennsylvania
- Born: Jean Jacques Michelet; 1697
- Died: August 18, 1769 (aged 71–72)
- Known for: Whitehall Township settler

John Jacob Mickley (1697–1769) (born Jean Jacques Michelet) was an early settler of Whitehall Township, Lehigh County, Pennsylvania.

== Early life and education ==
Mickley was born Jean Jacques Michelet in 1697 in Zweibrücken, Germany. He was the eldest son of Louis Michelet (1675–1750) and Susanne Mangeot (1674–1710). His parents were Protestants from Metz, who moved to Zweibrücken to get married. There, his father became pastor of a Huguenot congregation.

== Career ==
On May 4, 1733, he boarded the ship Hope, sailing from Rotterdam and arriving in Philadelphia on August 28, 1733. His name became anglicized as John Jacob Mickley. He first lived with a relative in Berks County, Pennsylvania for several years. In 1745, he acquired farmland in Egypt, Pennsylvania in Whitehall Township, Lehigh County, Pennsylvania, becoming one of the township's first settlers.

== Personal life ==
Mickley married Elizabeth Barbara Burkhalter (1719–1769). They had four sons and three daughters.

On October 8, 1763, several settlers, including two of his children, Henry and Barbara, were killed in an Indian attack. In 1913, a granite marker was erected by the Lehigh County Historical Society commemorating those killed in the attack.

Three of Mickley's sons, John Jacob, John Martin, and John Peter, served in the American Revolutionary War. His eldest son, John Jacob Mickley (1737–1808), is known for transporting the Liberty Bell, then known as the Pennsylvania State Bell, from Philadelphia to Allentown in September, 1777, where it was hidden underneath floorboards inside the High German Evangelical Reformed Church in Center City Allentown for nine months until June 1778 to avoid the bell's capture by the British Army prior to the British occupation of Philadelphia. Today, the Liberty Bell Museum, located inside this Allentown church, commemorates the Liberty Bell's heroic and successful hiding there by Mickley and others.

Mickley's great-grandson Jacob Mickley (1794–1888) was an elder on the building committee of the Whitehall German Reformed Church in Mickleys, Pennsylvania.

== Death ==
Mickley died August 18, 1769, and was buried in the cemetery of the Egypt Church. In 1864, he was reinterred at Mickley's Cemetery, now known as St. John's Union Cemetery.

== Legacy ==
The village of Mickleys is named after his family.

On October 12, 1917, the Michelet Chapter of the Daughters of the American Revolution in Allentown, Pennsylvania dedicated the Revolutionary and Huguenot Memorial of the Michelet family at Mickley's Cemetery.

== Gallery ==
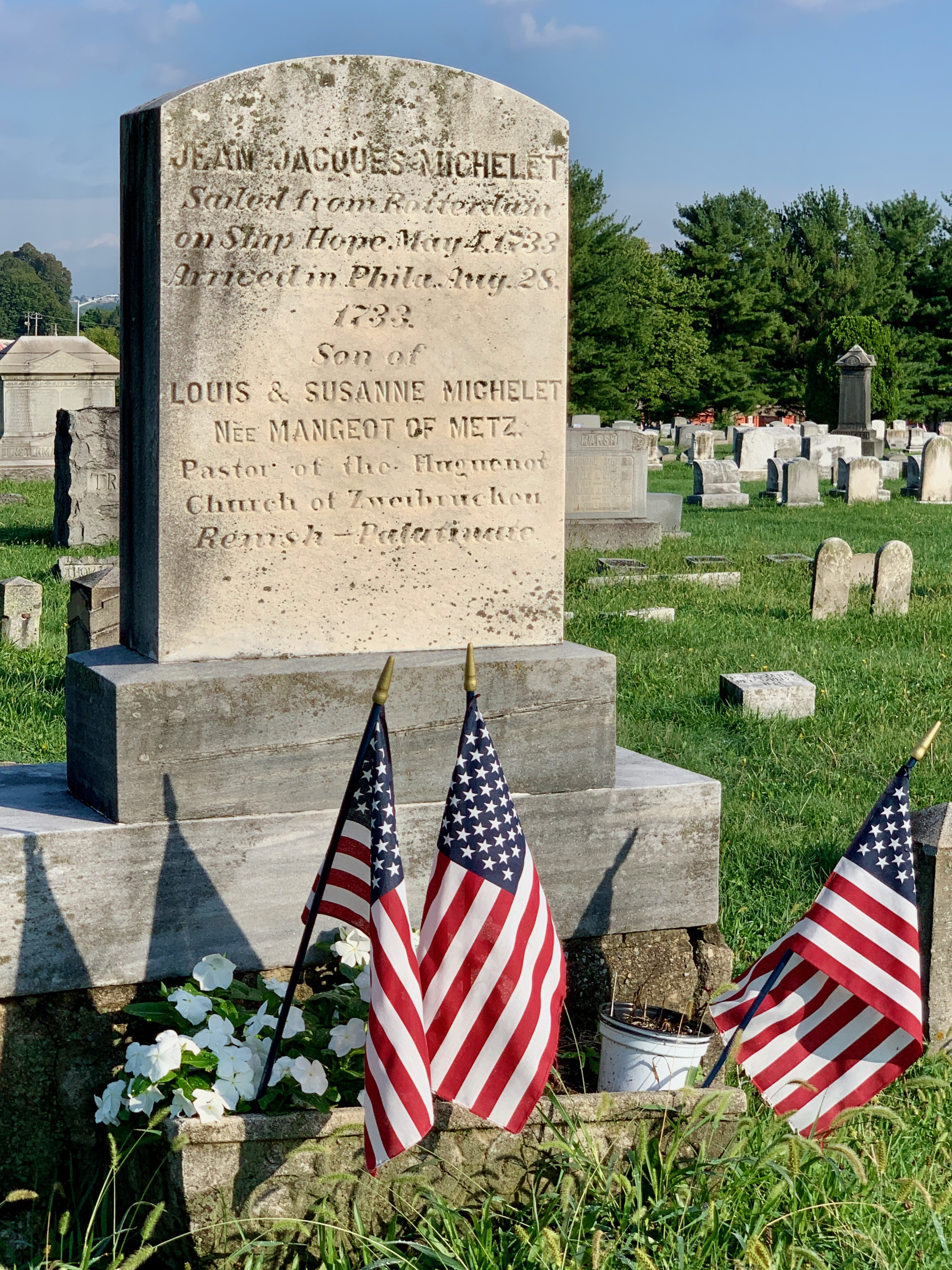
Memorial gravestone side with his birth name, Jean Jacques Michelet

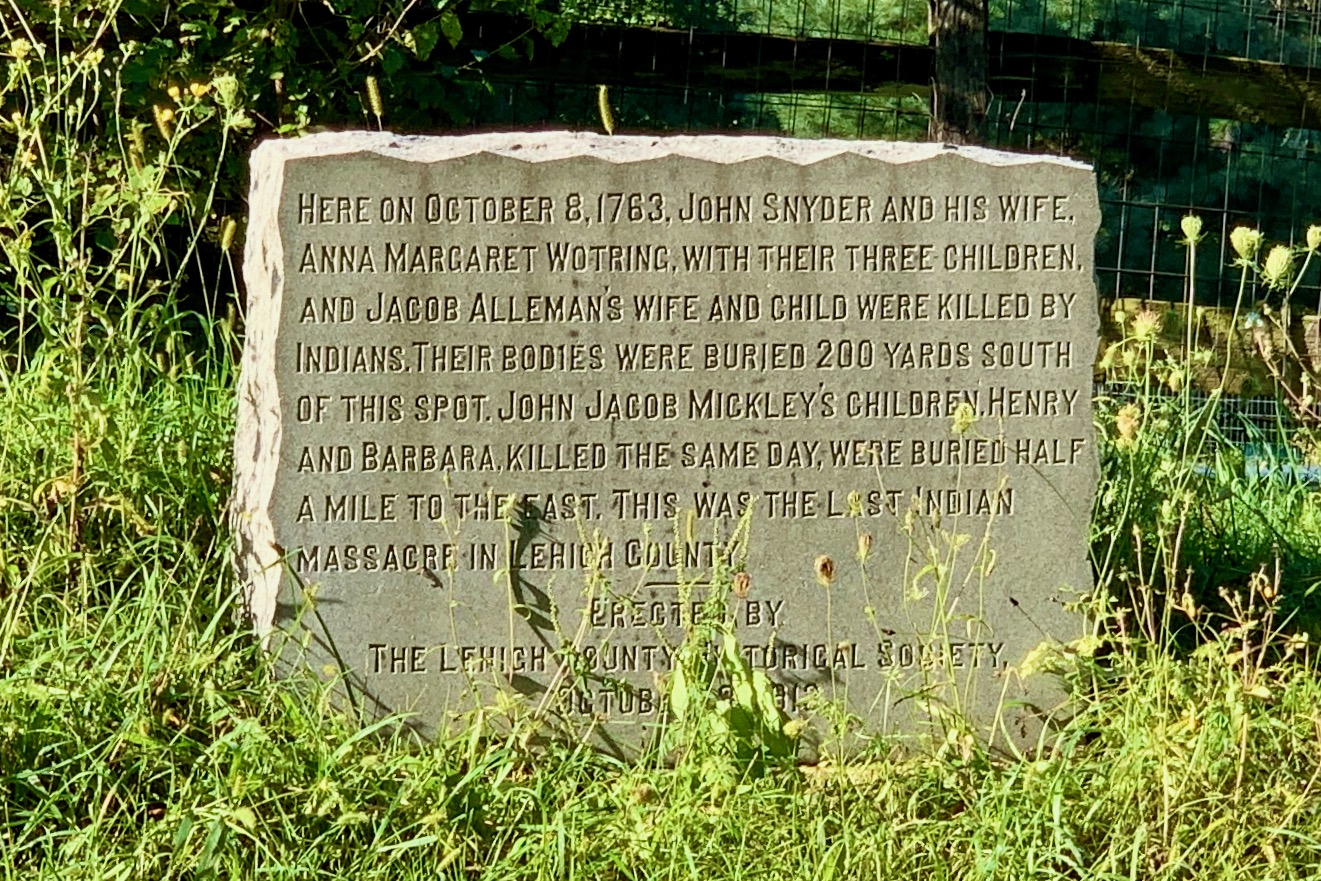
Memorial monument for his two children, Henry and Barbara
