= John Jacob Mickley (soldier) =

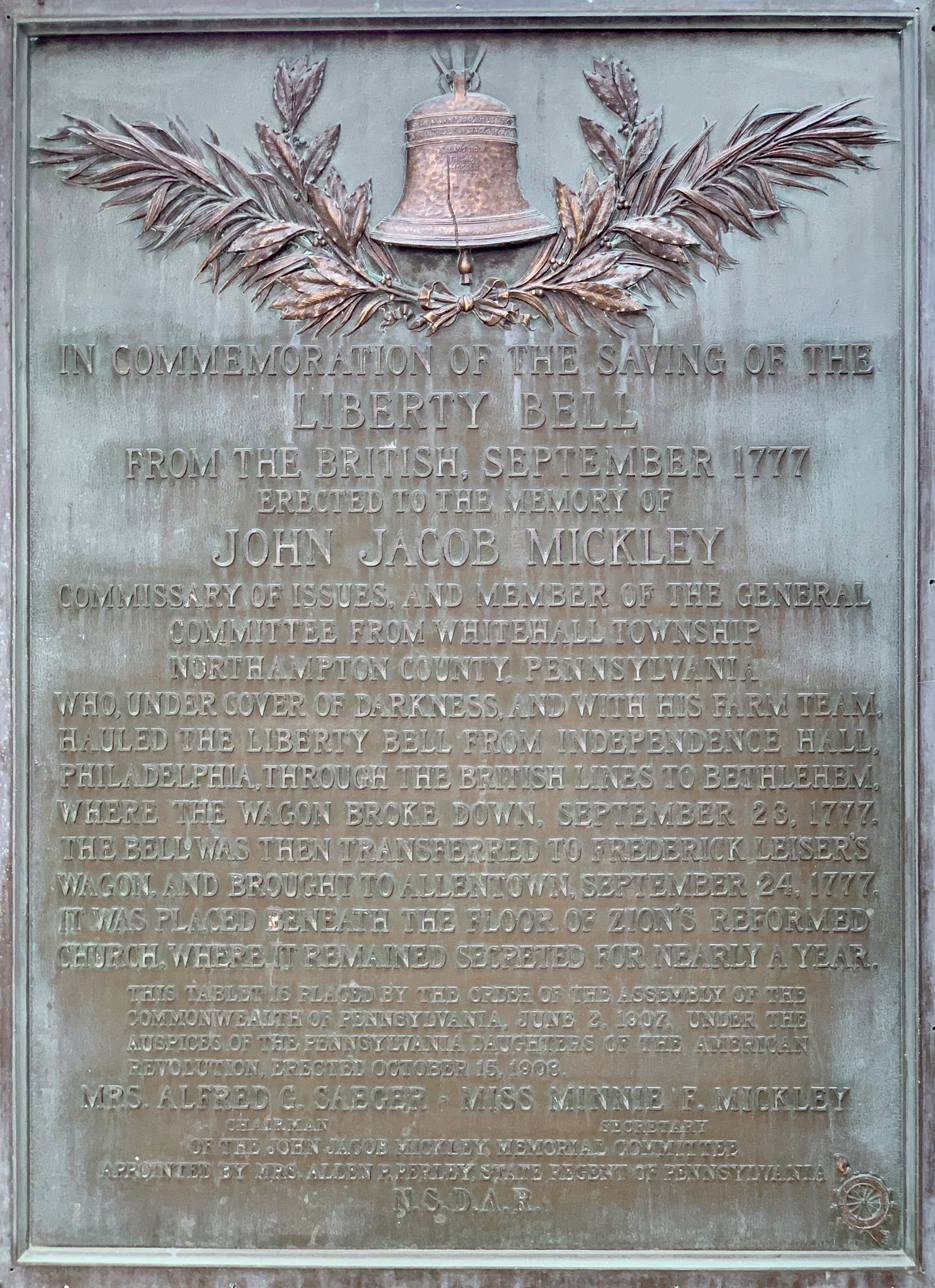
- The Saving of the Liberty Bell Plaque at Zion Reformed Church in Allentown, Pennsylvania
- Born: December 17, 1737; Egypt, Pennsylvania, US
- Died: December 12, 1808 (aged 70)
- Known for: Transporting the Liberty Bell from Philadelphia during the American Revolutionary War

John Jacob Mickley (1737–1808) was a farmer and soldier from Whitehall Township, Lehigh County, Pennsylvania, known for transporting the Liberty Bell from Philadelphia in September, 1777 during the American Revolutionary War.

== Life and family ==
He was born on December 17, 1737, to John Jacob Mickley (1697–1769) and Elizabeth Barbara Burkhalter (1719–1769) at their family homestead near Egypt in Whitehall Township. His father's birth name was Jean Jacques Michelet. At the time, the homestead was part of Northampton County, but is now part of Lehigh County.

He married Susanne Miller (1743–1807) in November, 1760.

On October 8, 1763, several settlers, including two of his siblings, Henry and Barbara, were killed in an Indian attack. In 1913, a granite marker was erected by the Lehigh County Historical Society commemorating this event.

He died on December 12, 1808.

== Revolutionary War ==
On November 15, 1776, he was elected to the General Committee of the Revolution of Northampton County.

After General George Washington's defeat at the Battle of Brandywine on September 11, 1777, Philadelphia, then capital for the Second Continental Congress, was under imminent attack by the British Army under General Sir William Howe. On September 14, to prevent capture of the city's tower bells, which could be melted into cannonballs, the Supreme Executive Council of the Commonwealth of Pennsylvania ordered that these bells be taken down and transported out of the city. The Liberty Bell, also known as the State House Bell, from Independence Hall was among these bells and was secured on Mickley's wagon. However, his wagon broke down on September 23 in Bethlehem. The bell was then transferred to the wagon of Frederick Leaser, who delivered it on September 24 to the Zion Reformed Church in Allentown, where it was hidden until June 1778 when the British departed Philadelphia.

== Legacy ==
On November 19, 1908, the Liberty Bell Chapter of the Daughters of the American Revolution unveiled the Saving of the Liberty Bell Plaque, describing the efforts of Mickley and Leaser, at Zion Reformed Church in Allentown, Pennsylvania. The plaque was unveiled by a descendant, nine-year old Edwin John Jacob Mickley.

On October 12, 1917, the Michelet Chapter (Allentown, Pennsylvania) of the Daughters of the American Revolution dedicated the Revolutionary and Huguenot Memorial for his father, himself, two of his brothers, John Martin and John Peter, who also served during the war, and his sister Magdalena at St. John's Union Cemetery in Mickleys.

== Gallery ==
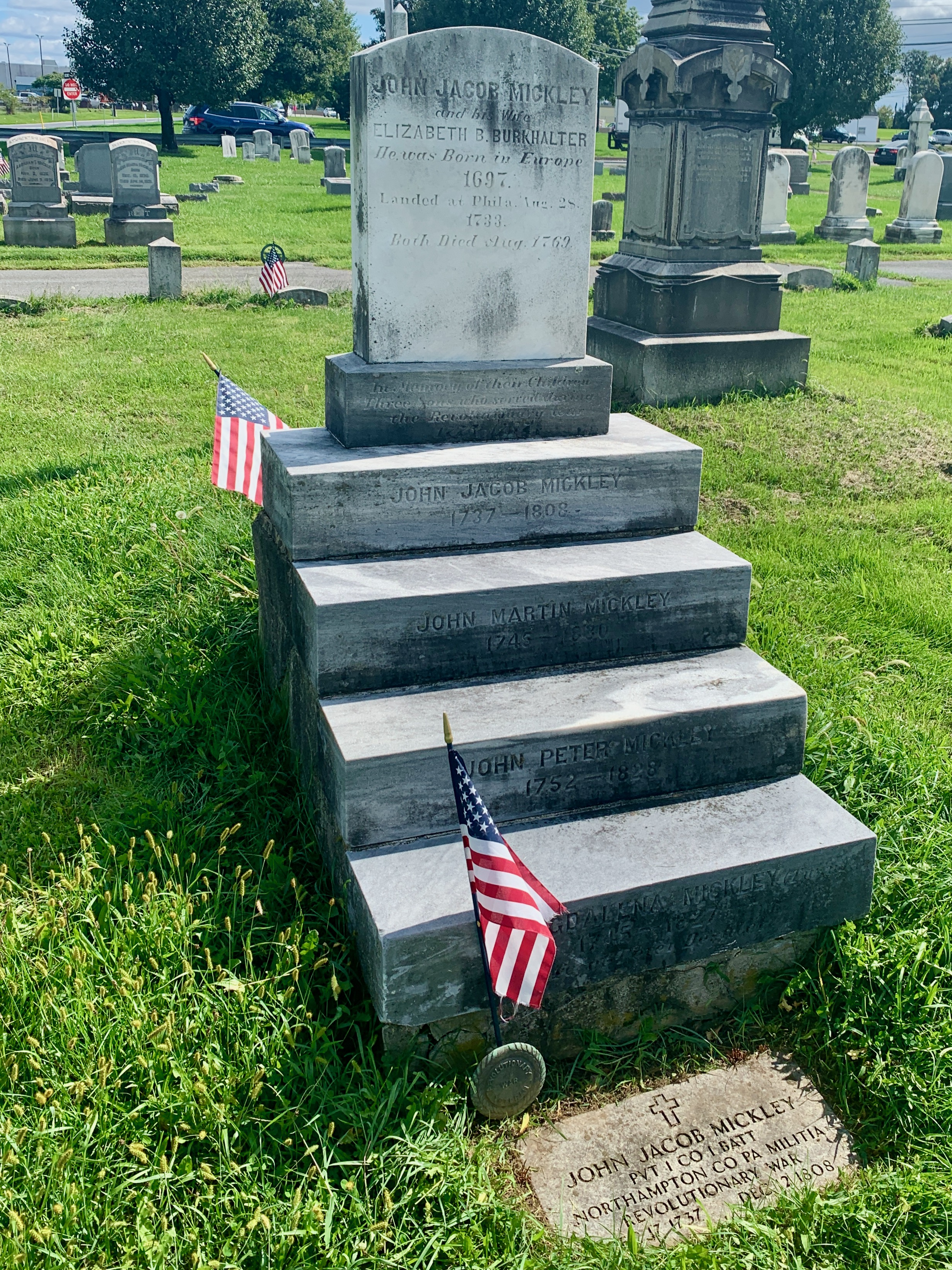
John Jacob Mickley Family Memorial

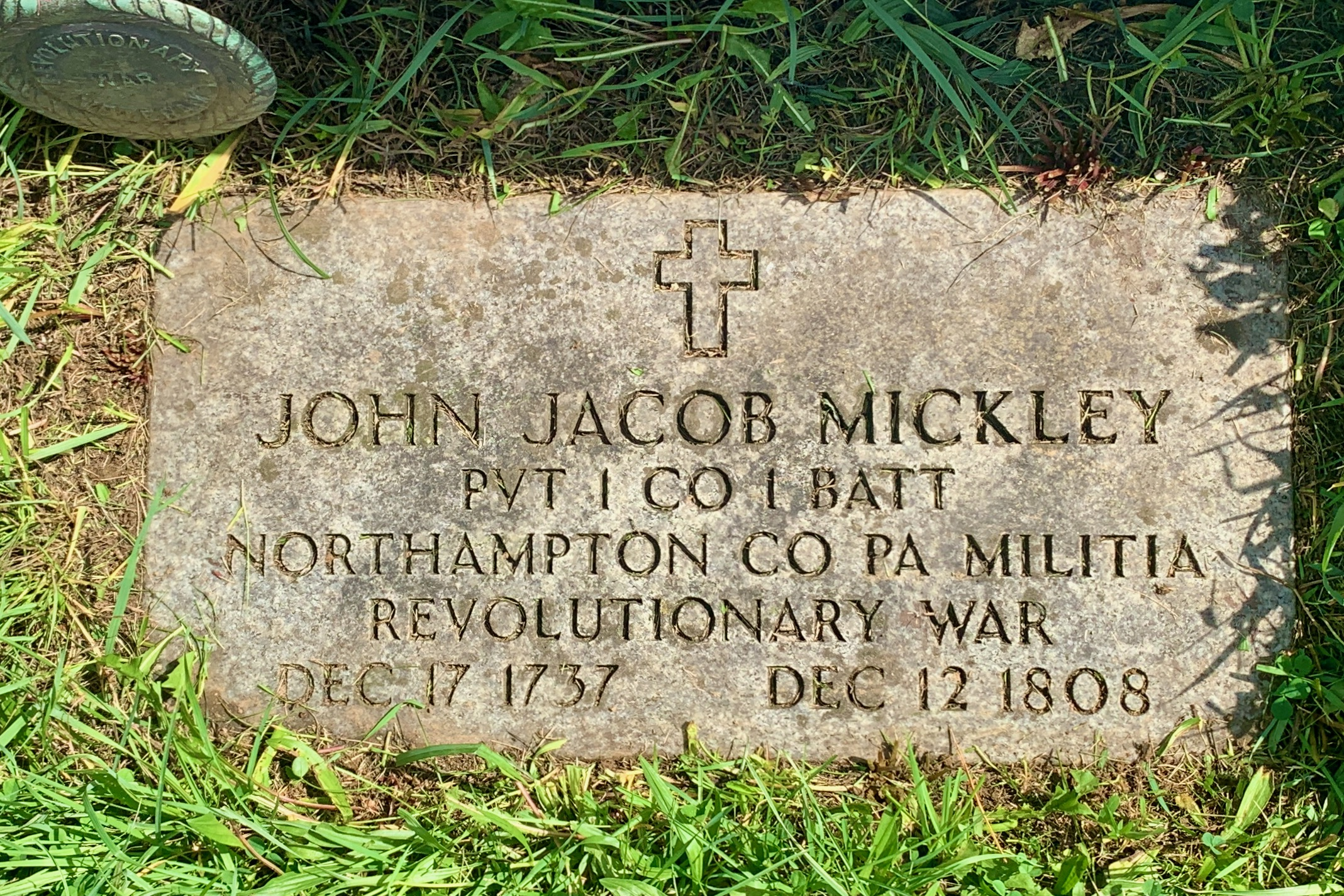
Gravestone at memorial base

== See also ==
- Liberty Bell Museum
