= Liberty Bell Museum =

History museum in Allentown, Pennsylvania

Coordinates: 40.6023°N 75.4704°W

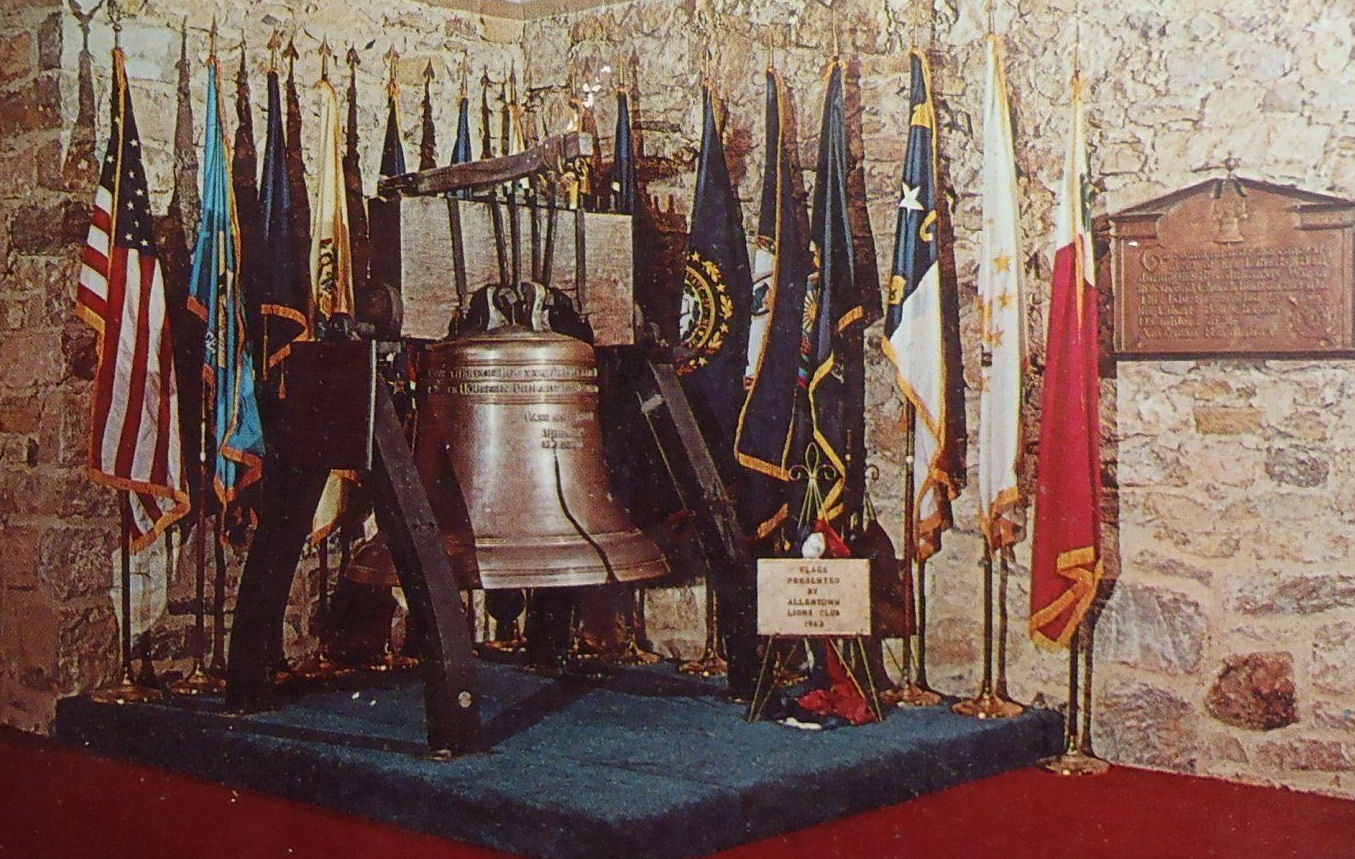
- Liberty Bell Museum in 1962
- Established: 1962
- Dissolved: 2023
- Location: 622 West Hamilton Street, Allentown, Pennsylvania, U.S.
- Type: History museum

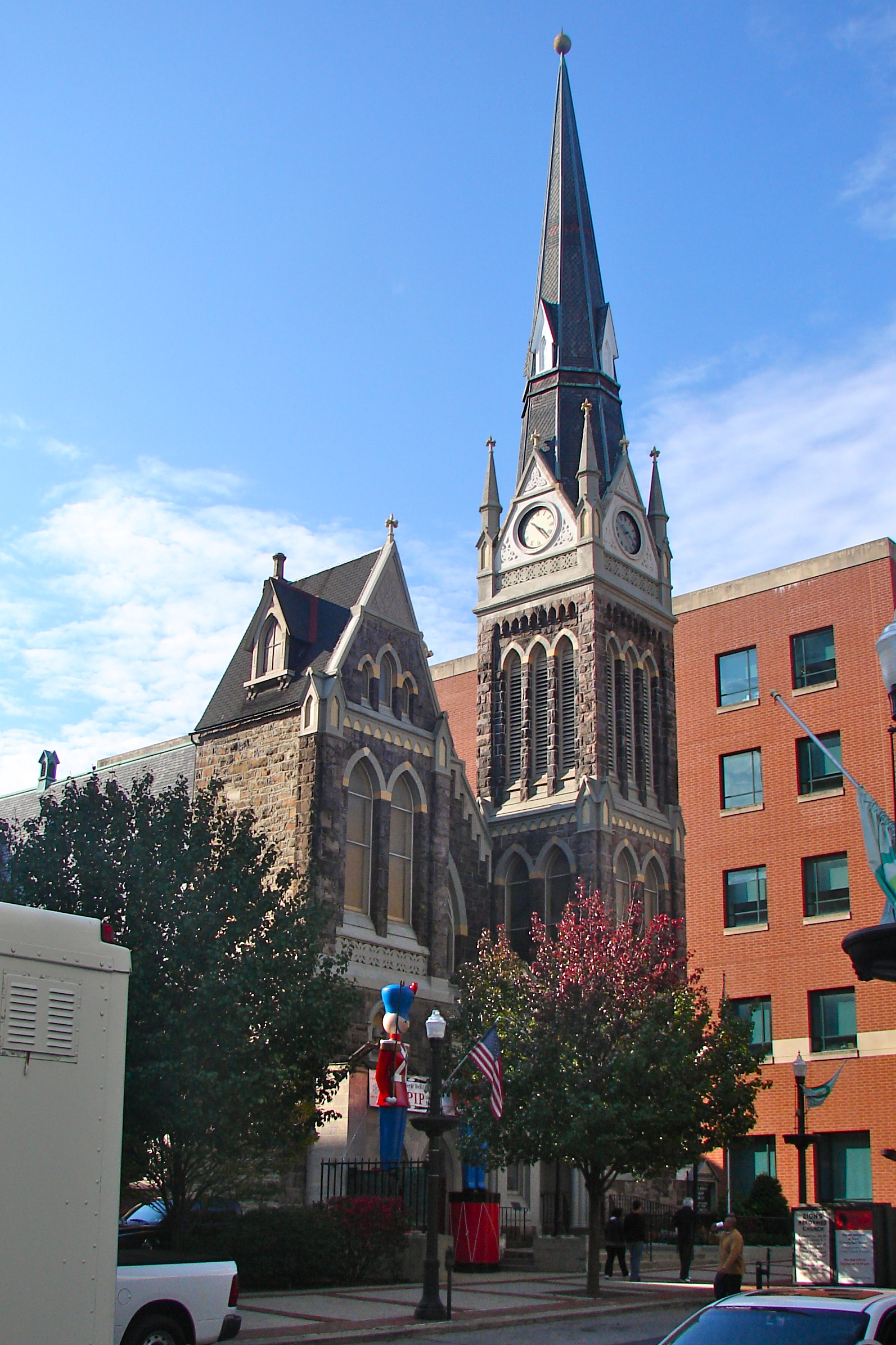
Zion United Church of Christ at 622 Hamilton Street in Allentown, where the Liberty Bell was successfully hidden under floor boards from the British Army from September 1777 until June 1778 during the British occupation of Philadelphia during the Revolutionary War.

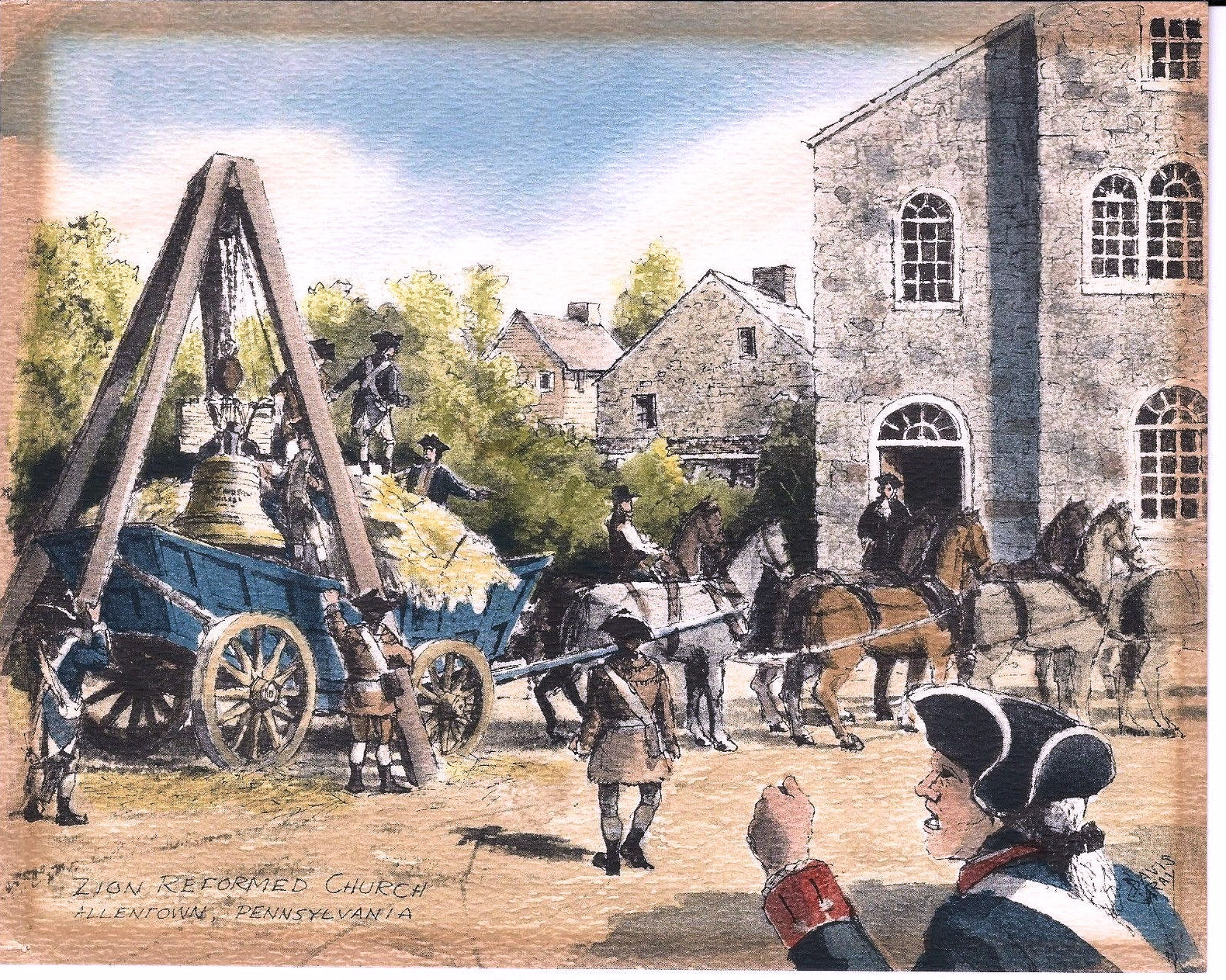
A watercolor painting depicting the arrival of the Liberty Bell at Zions Church, on September 24, 1777

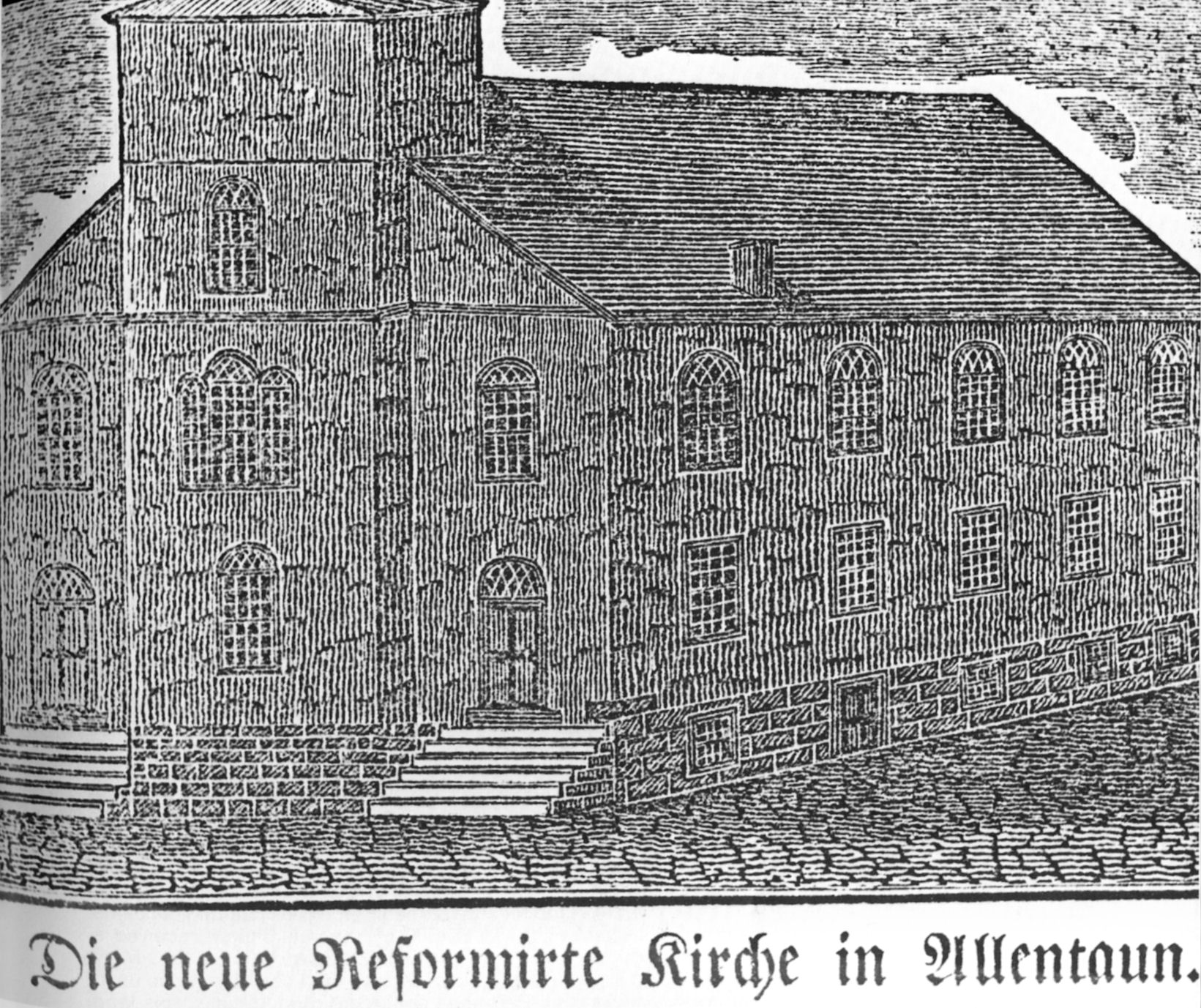
A woodcust image of Zion's Church, which includes a sketched message, indicating that the church was erected in 1773 and was the hiding place for the Liberty Bell during the winter of 1777–1778

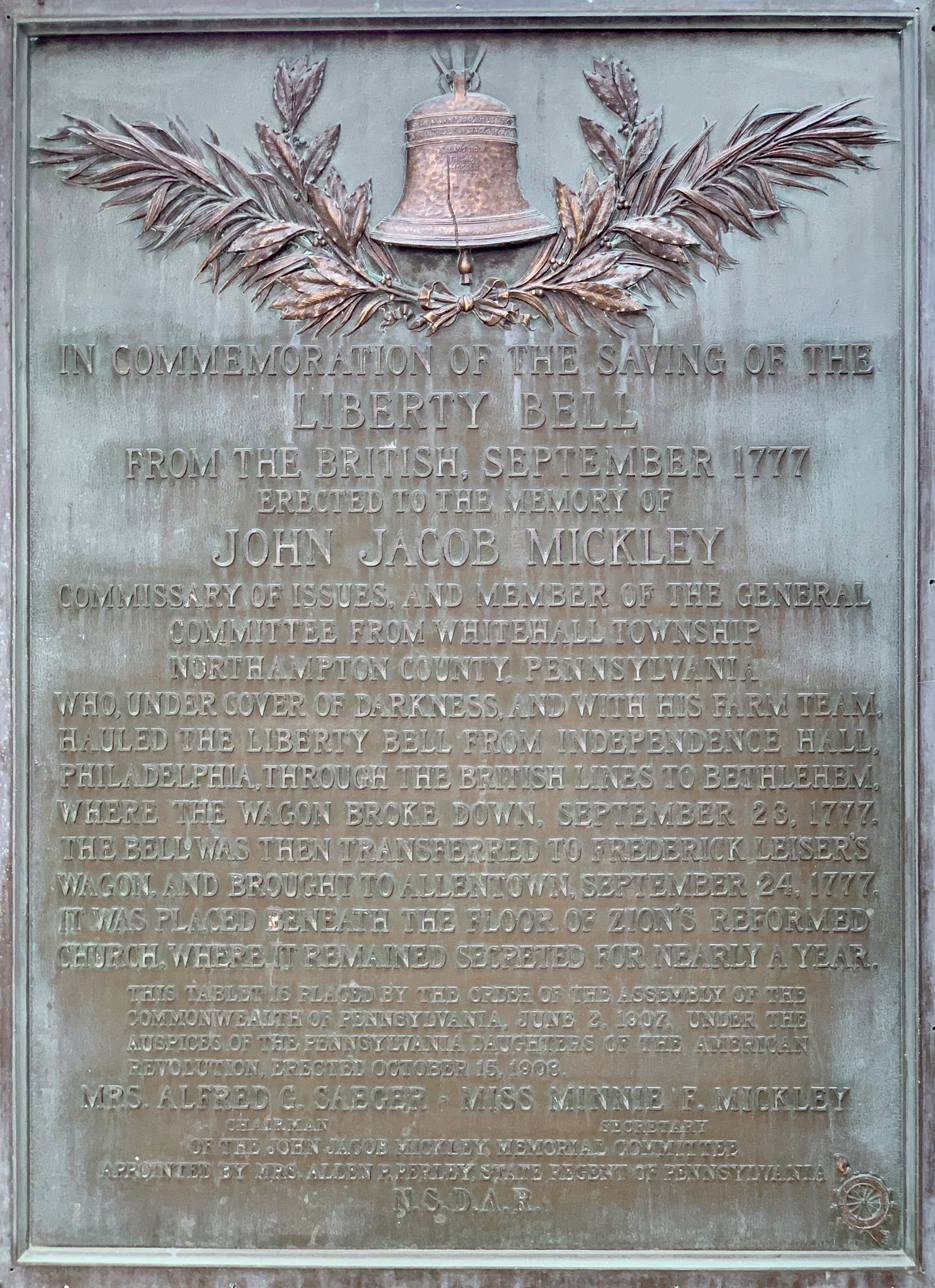
"The Saving of the Liberty Bell", a plaque commemorating John Jacob Mickley and Frederick Leaser at Zion United Church

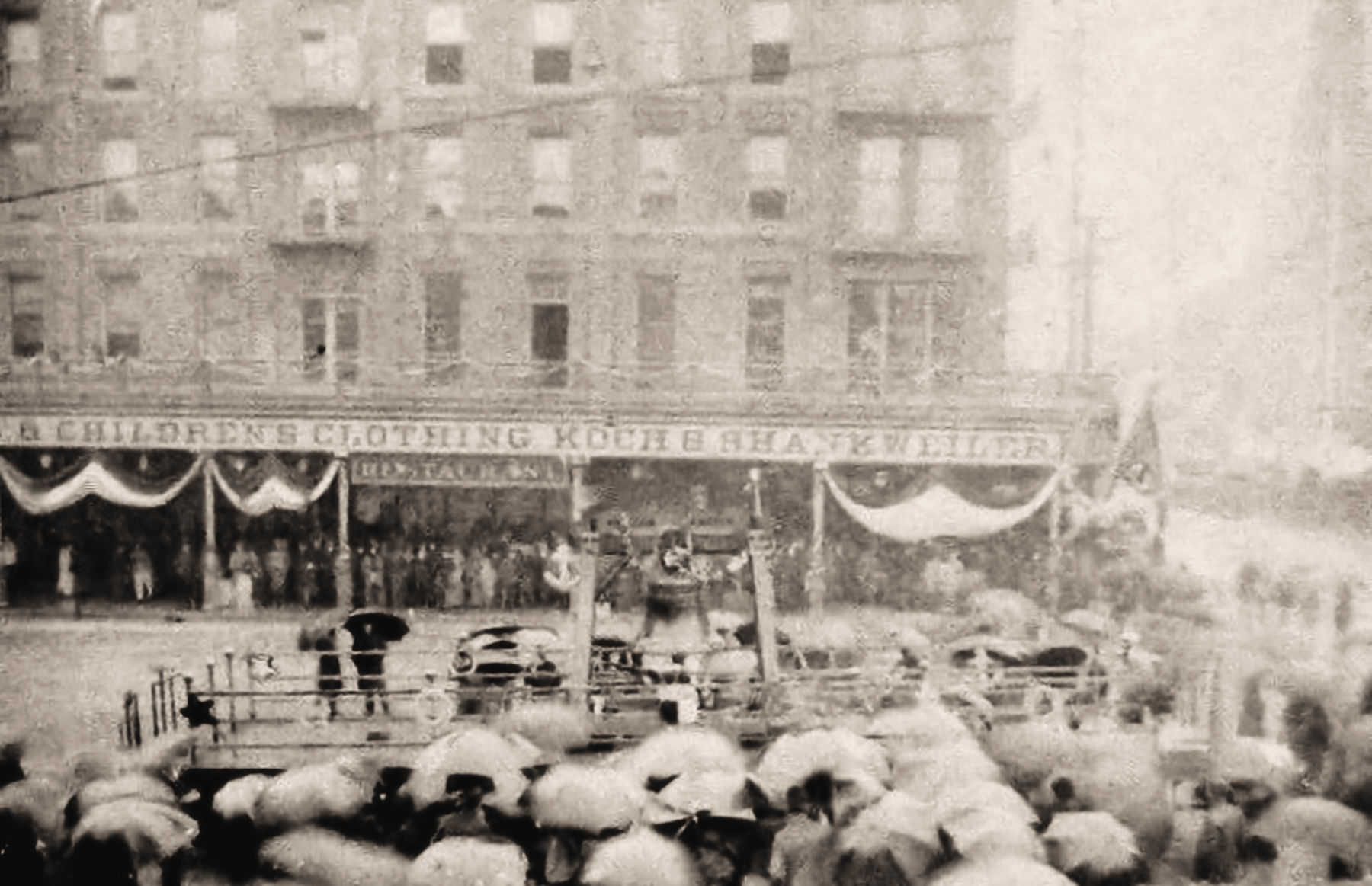
In 1893, the Liberty Bell returned to Allentown on its way to Philadelphia following the Columbian Exposition in Chicago; Hotel Allen and Zion's Church in Center City Allentown are visible (on the right)

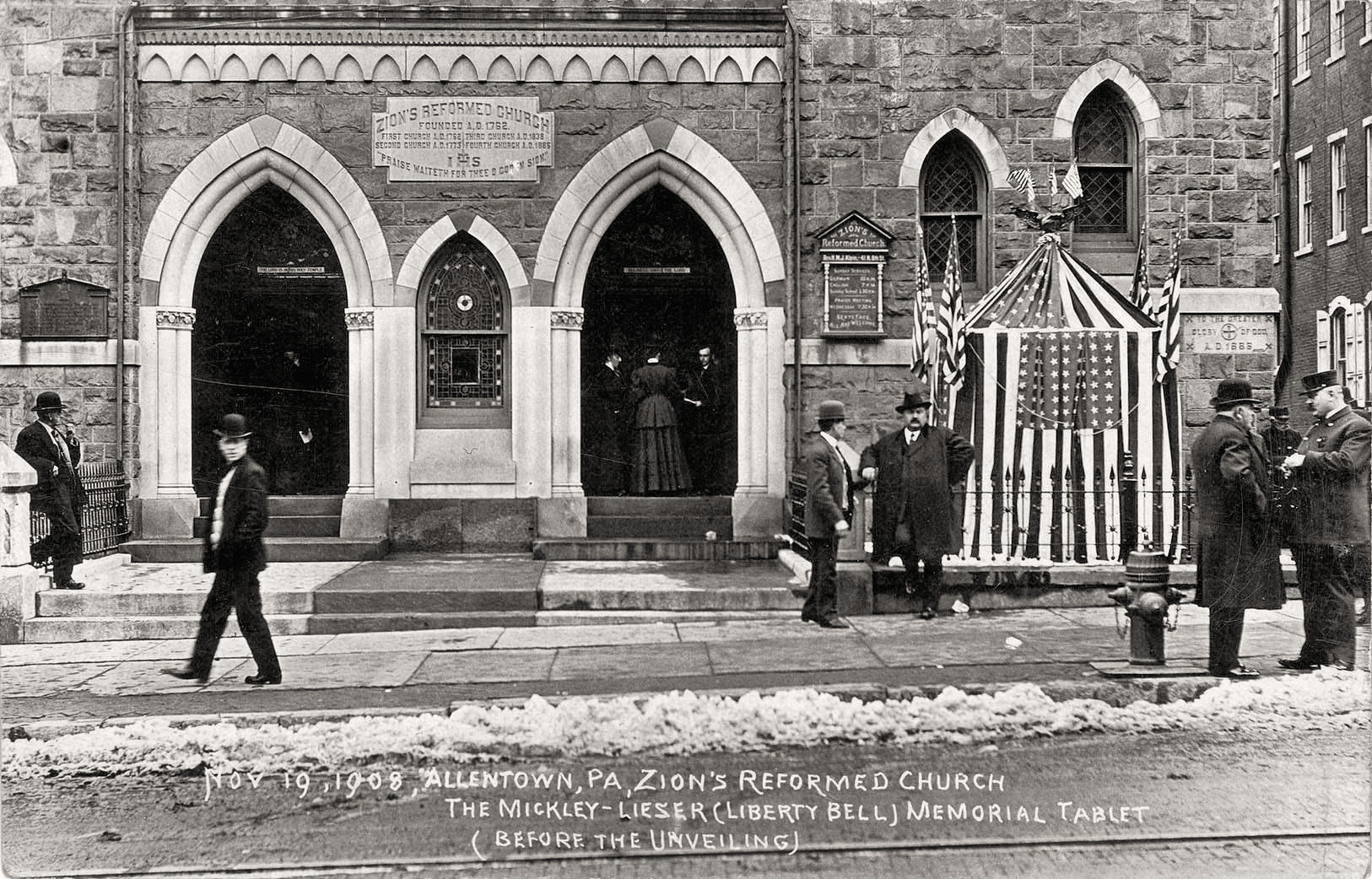
A 1908 plaque honoring John Jacob Mickley and Frederick Leaser at the church

The Liberty Bell Museum, also the Liberty Bell Shrine Museum was a non-profit organization and museum located in Zion's United Church of Christ, formerly Zion's Reformed Church, in Allentown, Pennsylvania in the Lehigh Valley region of eastern Pennsylvania. The museum was located in the basement of the church, where the Liberty Bell, an iconic and globally-recognized symbol of America's independence and freedom, was hidden from the British Army by Allentown-area American patriots during the American Revolutionary War from September 1777 to June 1778.

The museum was constructed and opened in 1962, and included exhibits relating to the Liberty Bell and subjects including liberty, freedom, patriotism and local history. It also contained a full-size replica of the Liberty Bell, one of 55 replicas cast in France in 1950, for a U.S. Treasury Department savings bond promotion, which visitors were permitted to ring.

Also on display was Allentown's Liberty Bell, which was cast in 1769, and was believed to have been rung on July 8, 1776, to announce the public reading in Allentown of the Declaration of Independence.

The museum closed in 2023 after the church was sold.

== History ==
=== Liberty Bell's hiding ===
After General George Washington's and the Continental Army's defeat at the Battle of Brandywine on September 11, 1777, the revolutionary capital of Philadelphia was defenseless, and the city prepared for what was seen as an inevitable British attack on the city as part of the British Philadelphia campaign.

Pennsylvania's Supreme Executive Council ordered that eleven bells, including the State House Bell, now known as the Liberty Bell, and ten other bells from Christ Church and St. Peter's Church in Philadelphia, be taken down and removed from the city to prevent the British Army from taking possession of them and melting them down to cast into munitions for use in the war.

A train of over 700 wagons, guarded by 200 cavalry from North Carolina and Virginia under command of Colonel Thomas Polk of the 4th North Carolina Regiment in the Continental Army, left Philadelphia for Bethlehem, in the Lehigh Valley, with the bells hidden beneath manure and hay in the wagons. The State House Bell was hidden in the wagon of Northampton County militia private John Jacob Mickley. On September 18, the entourage and its armed escort arrived in Richland Township in present-day Quakertown.

On September 23, 1777, the bishop of the Moravian Church in Bethlehem reported that the wagons had arrived, and all bells except the State House Bell had been moved to Northampton Towne in present-day Allentown. The following day, the State House bell was transferred to the wagon of Frederick Leaser and taken to the historic Zion Reformed Church in Center City Allentown, where it was stored with the other bells under the church's floorboards.

On September 26, 1777, three days after the Liberty Bell's arrival in Bethlehem, British forces marched into Philadelphia unopposed and occupied the city. The bell was later returned to Philadelphia in June 1778 following the end of the British occupation of Philadelphia.

=== 20th century ===
On November 19, 1908, the Liberty Bell Chapter of the Daughters of the American Revolution unveiled the Saving of the Liberty Bell Plaque, describing the efforts of Mickley and Leaser, at Zion Reformed Church in Allentown.

The museum serves as the headquarters of the Allentown Flag Day Association, which was established on July 3, 1907 by local residents Joe Hart and General Harry Clay Trexler. It is the oldest incorporated Flag Day Association in the nation.

In 1922, 50,000 people attended the Flag Association's event honoring General John J. Pershing, General of the Armies during World War I, representing the association's largest event to date.

=== 21st century ===
In 2003, the Liberty Bell Museum became the permanent home of Pip the Mouse, a puppet that was part of the show, "The Mouse Before Christmas." The holiday show originally was performed at Hess's, a now-defunct local department store, from 1962 to 1995. The character of Pip became regionally famous among children and was a staple of the store's holiday advertising and marketing campaigns.

On January 11, 2022, Zion's Consistory, the church's governing body, announced plans to put the church up for sale in late 2022 because of "declining membership and financial problems related to the COVID-19 pandemic." While the announcement did not indicate how the potential sale might impact the future of the Liberty Bell Museum, a consistory spokesperson indicated that preserving the museum was the church's "highest priority."

The museum and the church were not able to agree on a new lease, and the museum permanently closed on April 1, 2023. The former museum's artifacts were relocated to the Lehigh County Historical Society.

== See also ==
- American Revolution
- Liberty Bell
- Liberty Bell Memorial Museum in Melbourne, Florida
