= Mickleys, Pennsylvania =

Unincorporated community in Pennsylvania, US

- Unincorporated community
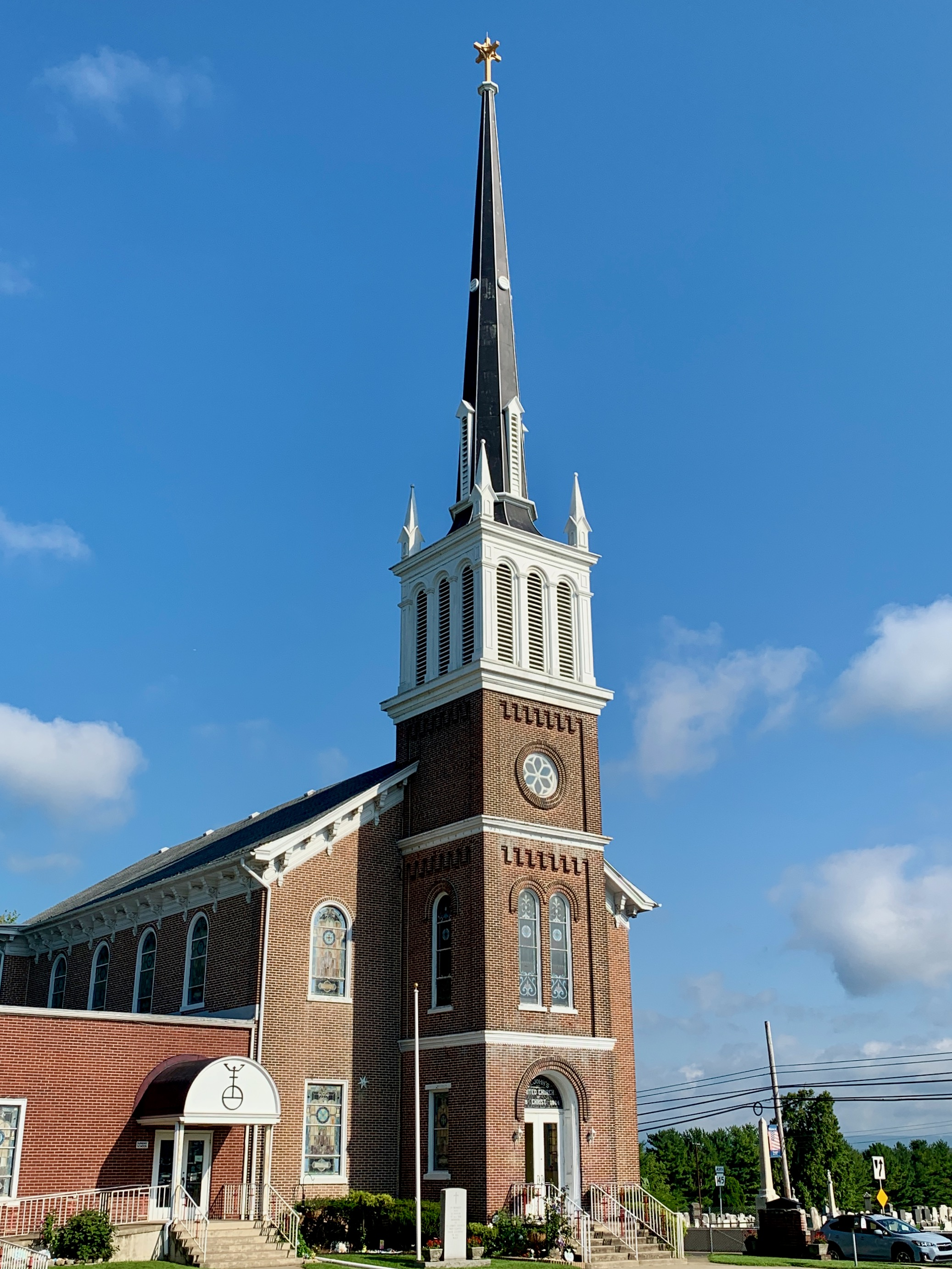
- St. John's United Church of Christ in Mickleys

- Location within Pennsylvania Location within the United States
- Coordinates: 40°38′50″N 75°29′44″W
- Country: United States
- State: Pennsylvania
- County: Lehigh
- Township: Whitehall
- Elevation: 384 ft (117 m)

Population
  - Metro: 865,310 (US: 68th)
- Time zone: UTC-5 (Eastern (EST))
  - Summer (DST): UTC-4 (EDT)
- ZIP code: 18052
- GNIS feature ID: 1204164

Mickleys is an unincorporated community that is located in Whitehall Township in Lehigh County, Pennsylvania. It is situated on Pennsylvania Route 145, also known as MacArthur Road. It is part of the Lehigh Valley, which has a population of 861,899 and is the 68th-most populous metropolitan area in the U.S. as of the 2020 census.

== History ==
This Pennsylvania village was named after the family of John Jacob Mickley (1697–1769), who settled here in 1745.

St. John's United Church of Christ, commonly called Mickley's Church, was built in 1849. Originally known as the South Whitehall Church, it was a Union Church with both Reformed and Lutheran congregations. Jacob Mickley (1794–1888), great-grandson of John Jacob, was an elder who served on the building committee.
