= Jefferson Barracks Telephone Museum =

- 12 Hancock Ave; St. Louis, Missouri 63125 www.jbtelmuseum.org
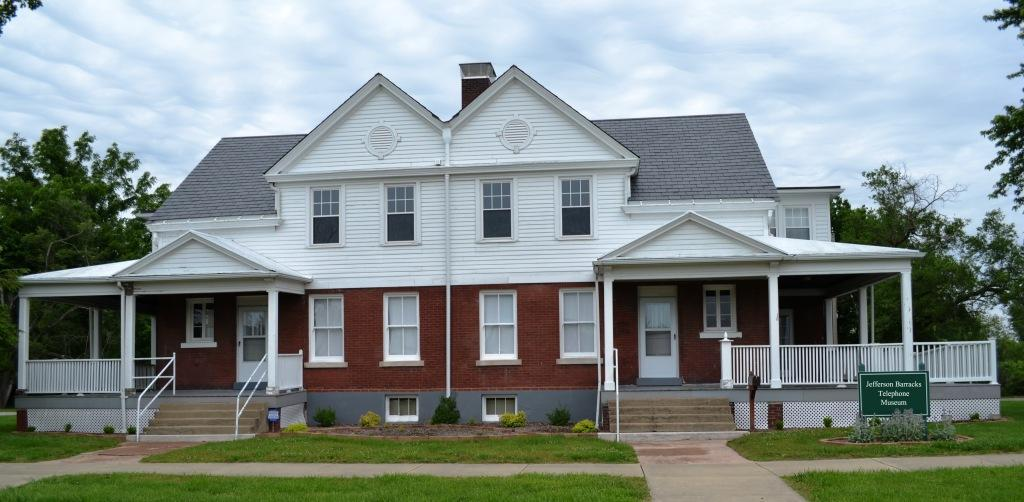
- Jefferson Barracks Telephone Museum

Site information
- Type: Quartermaster Plan 115

Site history
- Built: 1896
- Jefferson Barracks Historic District
- U.S. National Register of Historic Places
- U.S. Historic district
- NRHP reference No.: 72001492
- Added to NRHP: February 1, 1972

The Jefferson Barracks Telephone Museum is located at 12 Hancock Ave in Lemay, St. Louis County, Missouri. It is located within the 426-acre Jefferson Barracks Historic District which was added to the National Register of Historic Places in 1972. The museum is housed in a restored 1896 building that is a 15-minute drive south of downtown Saint Louis Missouri.

== Description ==
The building housing the Jefferson Barracks Telephone Museum was constructed as a two-story duplex that was built using Quartermaster Plan 115. It was constructed by Richard Deutman and Son architects and is one of two remaining structures that was part of Officers’ Row located on the north side of the former parade grounds.

The parade ground, central to the entire post, was the site of military drill and ritual. The placement of quarters around the parade ground was a clear delineation of military rank, with officers on the northern perimeter.

In 1909, electricity was added to the duplexes and bathrooms were installed in 1925. Sunrooms were added on the second floor and the first floor areas beneath each of the new rooms were enlarged in 1938. The officers and their families moved out the duplexes in the mid-1940s.

Members of the Telecom Pioneers, a non-profit 501(c)(3) telephone company employee service organization, and their families and friends have spent over 66,500 hours in repairing and renovating the building.

== History ==
Jefferson Barracks played a key role in westward movement, training and deploying troops to lead exploration of the west and to protect commerce and settlement along western trails. It was from Jefferson Barracks that many of the country’s significant western forts were established and supplied. Architecturally, the district contains buildings dating from three major military building periods including 1850s era munitions buildings, the nationwide military post redevelopment campaign of the 1880s and 1890s using standardized quartermaster plans and buildings associated with military build-up in World War I and II.

During the Civil War, the post housed one of the nation’s largest military hospitals, making critical advances in the treatment of wounded sent there from distant battlefields. Among the “firsts” occurring here is the Barracks’ initial mission as the U.S. Army’s first basic training center, the organization of the First Dragoons (forerunners of the American cavalry), the first successful parachute jump from an airplane, and the operation of the first Army Air Corps Technical Training School.

The Barracks provided the first military escort to merchant trains on the Santa Fe Trail, sent exploratory and protective troops out on the Oregon Trail and served as a central depot sending both men and supplies to a major network of western forts active during the various Indian Wars.

Countless American military heroes served at the post over the years. Early leaders Thomas Atkinson, Henry Leavenworth and Henry Dodge had already won fame in the War of 1812 before coming to Jefferson Barracks. The post’s size and military importance in the mid-19th century meant that most rising young West Pointers saw service there. This provided a pool of experienced leadership from which came hundreds of Civil War generals on both sides of the conflict, including Ulysses S. Grant and Robert E. Lee. Post commanders of later periods, Guy V. Henry, Walter Krueger and Walter C. Short took leading roles in the Spanish–American War and World War II.

== Exhibits ==
Besides its extensive collection of telephones manufactured from the 1900s through the 2000s, the Jefferson Barracks Telephone Museum also contains a working Central Office Step Switch, military telephones from WWII through the Vietnam War, hundreds of pieces of telephone-related equipment and tools, a telephone pole complete with climbing equipment, hundreds of pieces of telephone-related memorabilia from the 1880s through the 2000s, a large variety of novelty telephones, a special portable switchboard set up when U.S. Presidents Carter, Ford, Nixon and Johnson were visiting St. Louis and a sculpture of Alexander Graham Bell and history of the invention of the telephone.

The self-guided, accessible museum has many hands-on, how-things-work displays.

The displays were created to inspire an interest in engineering and history. Boy Scouts can utilize the museum to meet one of their Inventing and Engineering merit badge requirements. Guided tours are available for groups of 10 or more and should be scheduled at least two weeks before the tour.
