= Liberty Bell Memorial Museum =

Museum in Melbourne, Florida

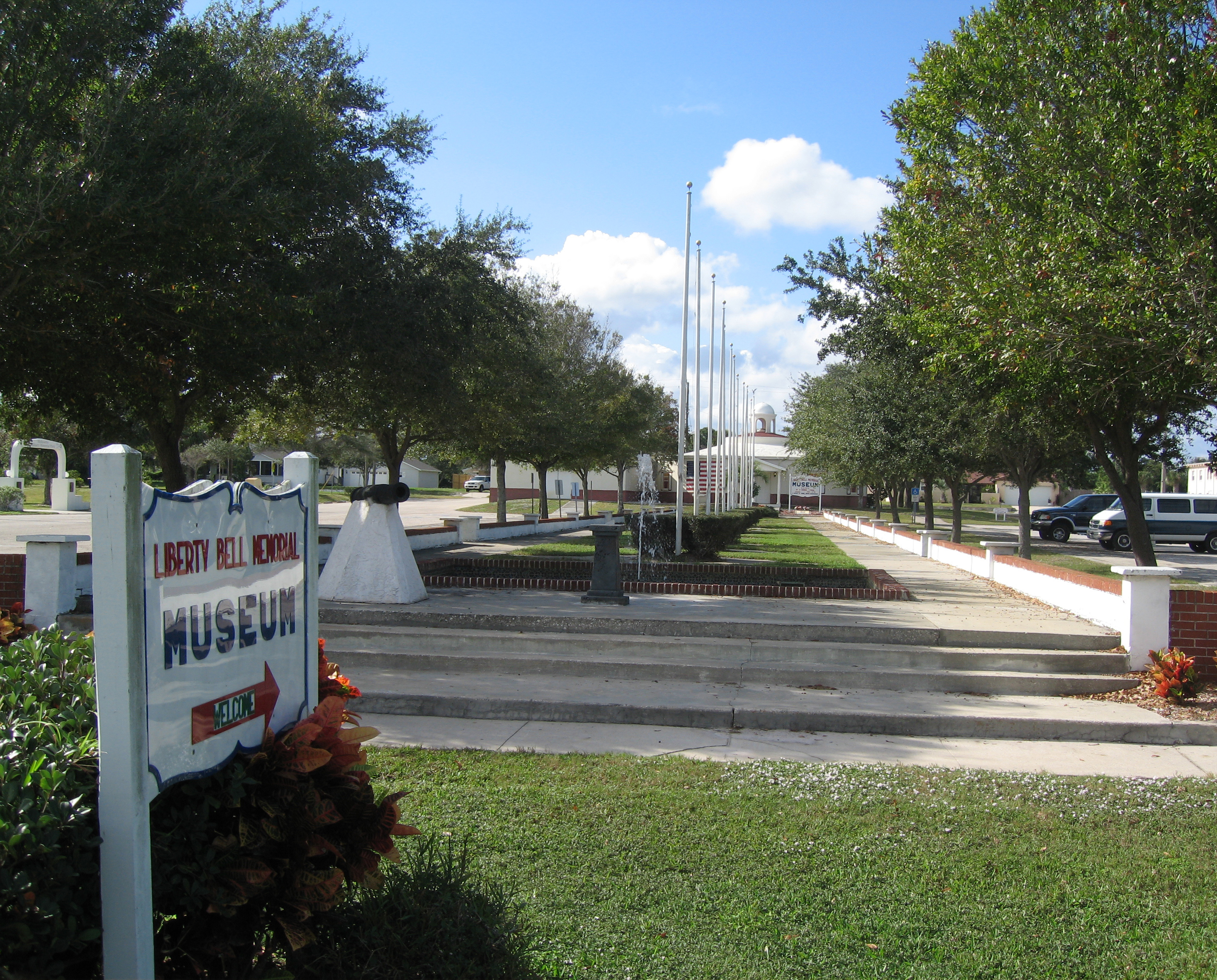
- Liberty Bell Museum in Melbourne, Florida

- Location within Florida
- Established: 1985
- Location: Wells Park, 1601 Oak Street; Melbourne, Florida 32901
- Coordinates: 28.0821°N 80.61331°W
- Type: Military and Local Interest Artifacts; U.S. History
- Website: honoramerica.org/liberty-bell-memorial-museum-2/

The Liberty Bell Memorial Museum is located in Wells Park at 1601 Oak Street in Melbourne, Florida adjacent to Melbourne Military Memorial Park. The museum is free to enter, and is divided into two main components: The Rotunda of American History and Freedom Hall.

== History ==
Honor America Inc., a non-profit organization dedicated to American history and heritage, founded the Liberty Bell Memorial Museum. It is housed in a former concrete ground water storage tank and the pump house of the original Melbourne Water Works Architect Joe Vislay designed the water storage tank and pump house and contractor Robert Stitzel built it.

In 2005, the organization expanded the museum, adding the Freedom Hall annex .

In 2013, the museum won the Colonel John H. Magruder III Award given by the Marine Corps Historical Foundation for excellence in depicting Marine Corps history.

== Exhibits ==
The Rotunda houses exhibits relating to American history, including a timeline of the history of the American nation, patriotic and historic artifacts, ephemera, Florida-specific history, and a full size replica of the Liberty Bell. The replica bell was cast by Whitechapel Bell Foundry, the casters of the original bell for the Pennsylvania State House (now called Independence Hall). It was purchased with funds raised by local schoolchildren during the U.S. Bicentennial Celebration.

Freedom Hall houses militaria relating to each branch of the U.S. Armed Forces and educational exhibits regarding major conflicts in which the United States has been a belligerent.

== See also ==
- American Revolution

== Gallery ==
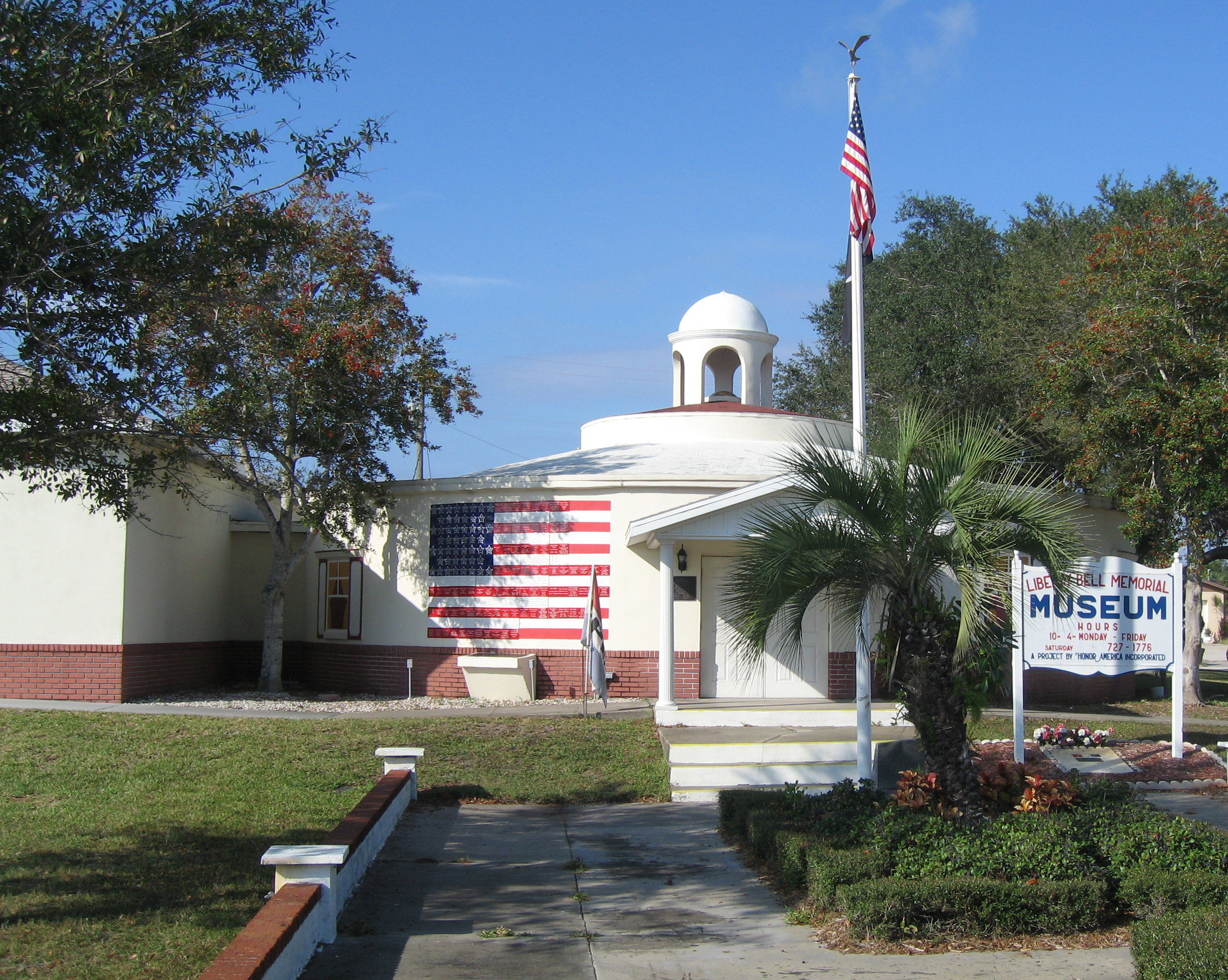
Front view of museum

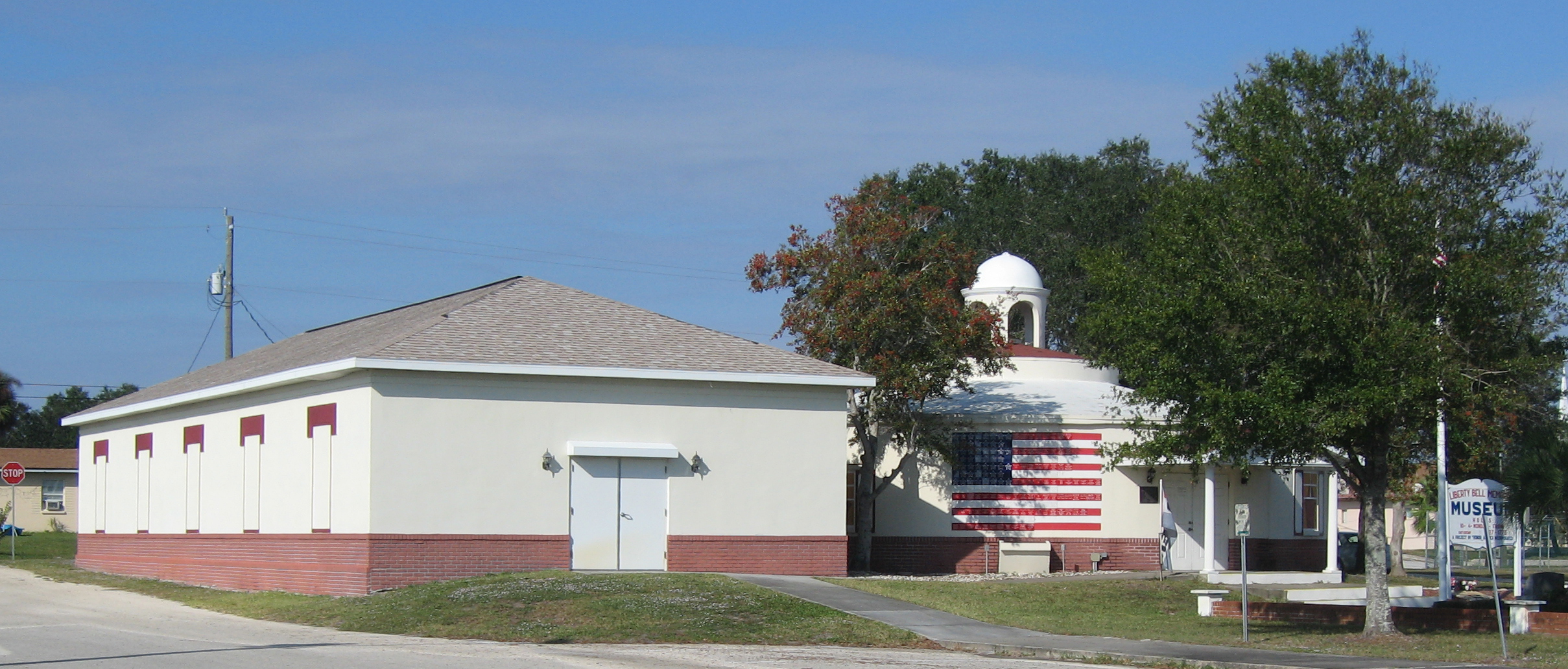
Front view of museum

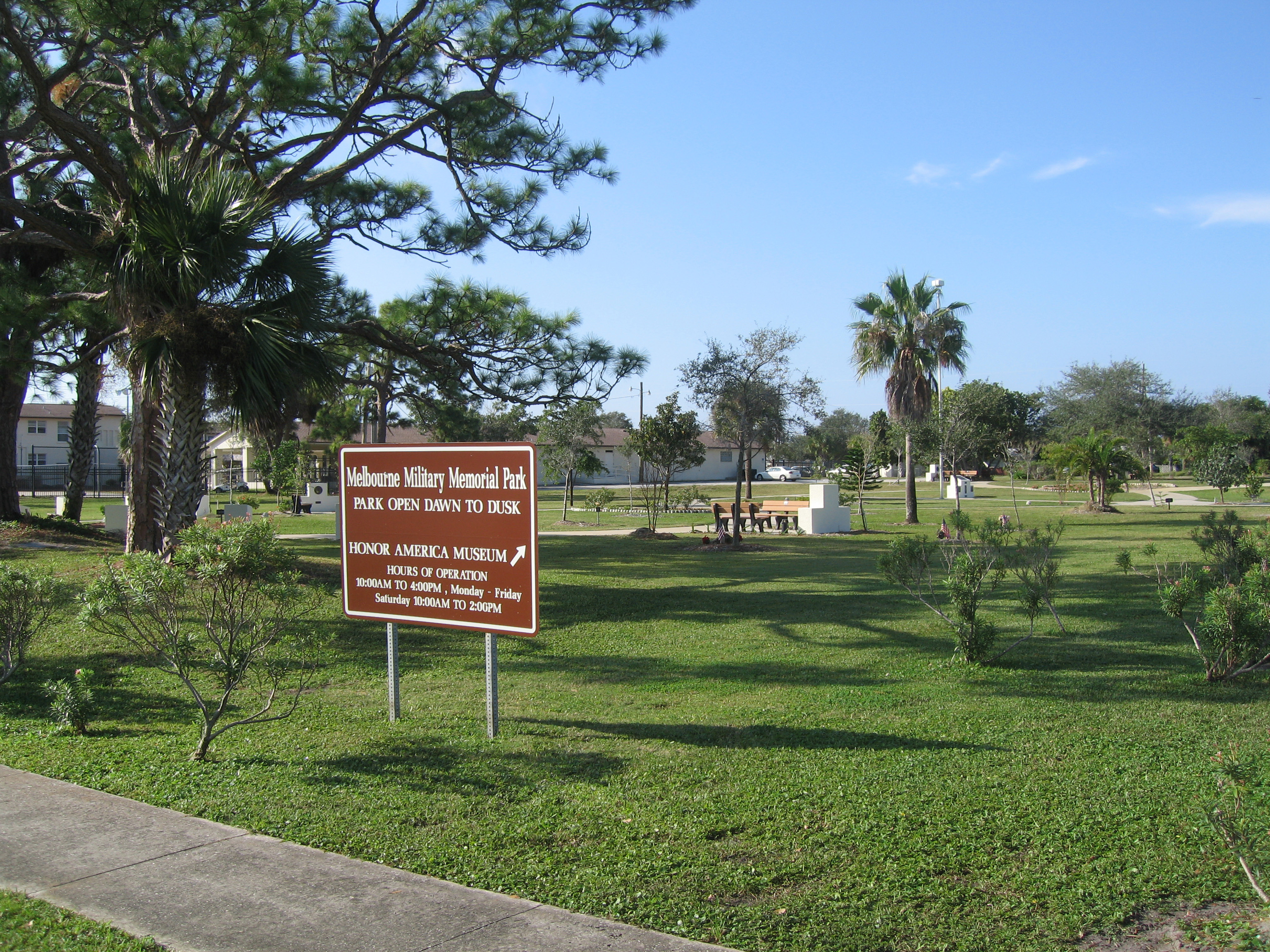
Melbourne Military Memorial Park
