= High German Evangelical Reformed Church =

Historic church in Pennsylvania, USA

Coordinates: 40.6023°N 75.4704°W

- U.S. National Register of Historic Places
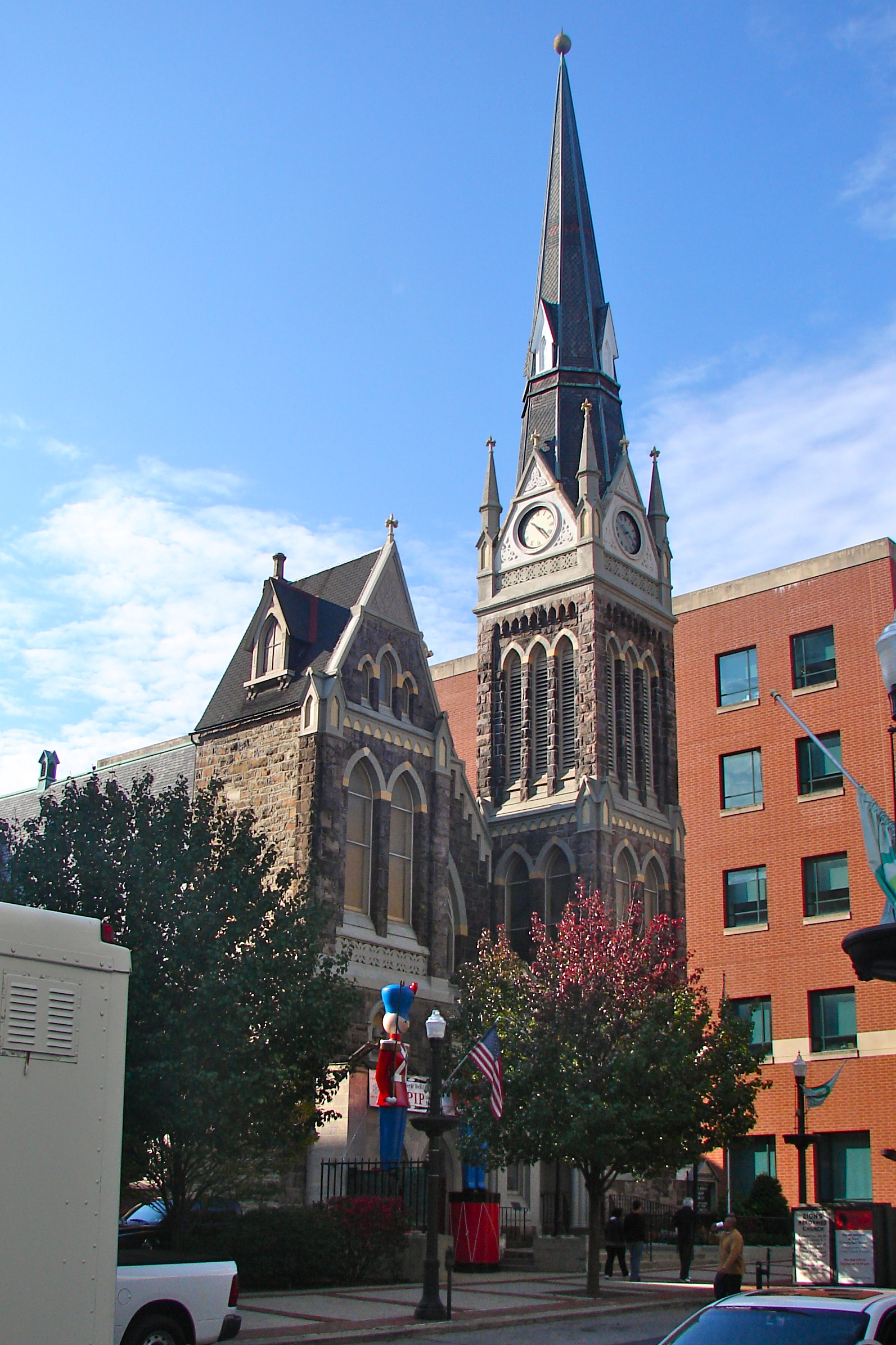
- Zion United Church of Christ in October 2011

- Location within Pennsylvania Location within the United States
- Location: 622 West Hamilton Street, Allentown, Pennsylvania, U.S.
- Area: 0.5 acres (0.20 ha)
- Built: 1762
- Architect: Lewis Jacoby
- Architectural style: Late Gothic Revival
- NRHP reference No.: 83002259
- Added to NRHP: July 28, 1983

The High German Evangelical Reformed Church, also known as Zion Reformed, Zion United Church of Christ, and Resurrected Life Community Church (United Church of Christ) is an historic Evangelical and Reformed church building, located at 622 West Hamilton Street in Allentown, Pennsylvania in the Lehigh Valley region of eastern Pennsylvania.

During the American Revolutionary War, the church was selected as the site to hide and protect the Liberty Bell from seizure as British troops prepared the Philadelphia campaign, designed to attack and occupy the revolutionary capital in Philadelphia. The Liberty Bell was hidden beneath floor boards in the church for nine months, from September 1777 until the British ultimately departed Philadelphia in June 1778.

Until 2023, the church housed the Liberty Bell Museum, established to honor the role that Allentown and Lehigh Valley-area American patriots played in guarding the Liberty Bell.

== History ==
=== 18th century ===
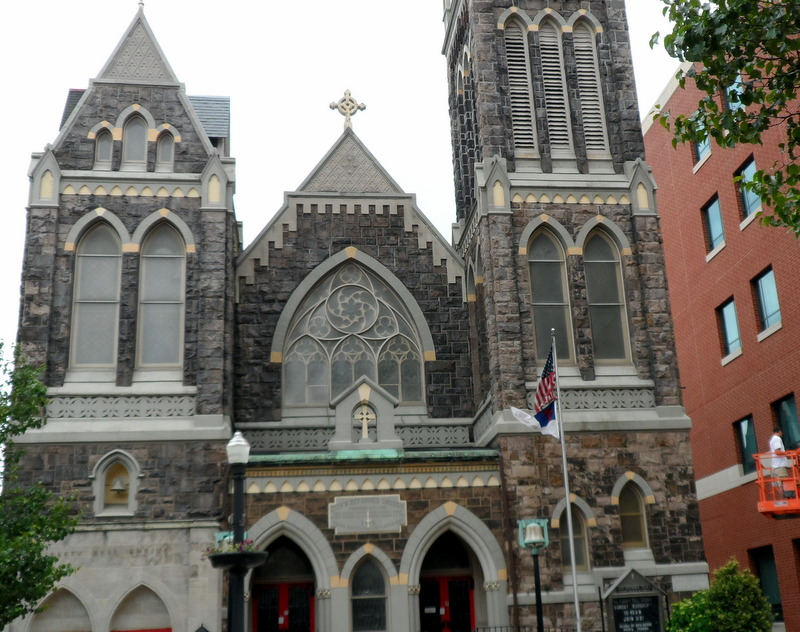
The church in June 2013

Initially built as a log structure on its present-day site at 622 Hamilton Street in Center City Allentown in 1762, the original High German Evangelical Reformed Church building was replaced in 1773 with a simple brick structure, which was designed in a vernacular federal style and erected a few yards north of the first log church's location.

==== Liberty Bell's hiding ====
In September 1777, as American forces prepared for a British offensive against Philadelphia, the Liberty Bell and other bells in Philadelphia were ordered taken down and then hastily transported to present-day Allentown, which was then called Northampton Towne, where they were successfully hidden under the church's floor boards until June 1778 when the British abandoned Philadelphia.

=== 19th century ===
In 1838, when Zion Reformed was enlarged, contractors may have incorporated the 1762 structure into the walls of the current building's boiler room. The building was then enlarged further between 1886 and 1888 via gothic revival-style improvements made by architect Lewis Jacoby.

=== 20th century ===
In 1983, in recognition of the church's valuable contribution to the nation's early history, it was added to the National Register of Historic Places. In February 2023, the building was sold to Resurrected Life Community Church, a newer congregation that is part of the same denomination, the United Church of Christ.

== Liberty Bell Museum ==
The church was home to the Liberty Bell Museum. The museum was located in the church's basement, which is where the Liberty Bell was hidden in 1777. The museum closed in 2023.

== See also ==
- List of historic places in Allentown, Pennsylvania
